= List of people from Quebec City =

The following is a list of notable people from Quebec City, Quebec, Canada. See Category: People from Quebec City for a more systematic list.

== A ==
- André Arthur (1943-2022), radio host and politician

== B ==
- Alfred Bailey (1905-1997), farmer, educator, poet, anthropologist
- Steve Barakatt (b. 1973), musician
- Alexandre Barrette (b. 1981), comedian and television host
- Marty Barry (1905-1969), former NHL player
- Myriam Bédard (b. 1969), biathlon, three Olympic medals
- Johanne Bégin (b. 1971), water polo, 2000 Summer Olympics
- Patrice Bergeron (b. 1985), NHL player for the Boston Bruins
- Steve Bernier (b. 1985), NHL player
- Sylvie Bernier (b. 1964), diving, gold medal, 1984 Summer Olympics
- Martin Biron (b. 1977), NHL goaltender
- Mathieu Biron (b. 1980), NHL player
- Céline Bonnier (b. 1965), actor
- Gaétan Boucher (b. 1958), speed skating, four Olympic medals
- Francis Bouillon (b. 1975), NHL player for the Nashville Predators

== C ==
- Dayana Cadeau (b. 1966), Haitian-born Canadian American professional bodybuilder
- Lawrence Cannon (b. 1947), federal politician, Canadian minister of foreign affairs
- Marc Chouinard (b. 1977), NHL player
- Jean-Philippe Côté (b. 1982), NHL player

== D ==
- Kevin Dineen (b. 1963), former NHL player
- Stéphane Dion (b. 1955), politician
- Campbell Mellis Douglas (1840–1909), winner of the Victoria Cross
- Jessica Dubé (b. 1987), figure skater
- Catherine Dubois (born 1995), Professional ice hockey forward for the Montreal Victoire in the Professional Women's Hockey League (PWHL).
- Paul Dumont (1920–2008), administrator of the Quebec Major Junior Hockey League
- Francis Ducharme (born 1981), actor and dancer
- Gaétan Duchesne (1962–2007), NHL player
- Laurent Dubreuil (born 1992), speed skating

== F ==
- Adine Fafard-Drolet (1876-1963), singer and founder of a music school
- Jonathan Ferland (b. 1983), AHL player
- Jeff Fillion, radio personality
- Lionel Fleury (1912-1997), president of the Canadian Amateur Hockey Association and the Quebec Amateur Hockey Association
- Glenn Ford (1916-2006), actor

== G ==
- Louis-Philippe Gagné (1900-1964), newspaper editor and politician in the United States
- Simon Gagné (b. 1980), NHL player for the Tampa Bay Lightning
- André-Philippe Gagnon (b. 1962), comedian
- François Gagnon, ice hockey journalist and television commentator
- Marc Garneau (b. 1949), astronaut and politician
- Richard Garneau (1930-2013), sports journalist
- Félix-Odilon Gauthier (1808-1876), lawyer and judge
- Émile Genest (1921-2003), actor
- Marie Gignac, actor
- Neil Gillman (1933-2017), theologian
- Léon Gingras (1808-1860), Catholic priest, educator, seminary administrator and author
- Rémy Girard (b. 1950), actor
- Alexandre Giroux (b. 1981), NHL player
- Jocelyne Gros-Louis first woman Grand Chief of an indigenou nation

== H ==
- Anne Hébert (1916-2000), writer
- Paul Hébert (1924-2017), actor

== K ==
- Larkin Kerwin (1924-2004), physicist, President of the Canadian Space Agency
- Cornelius Krieghoff (1815-1872), painter
- Pom Klementieff (b. 1986), actress

== L ==
- Régis Labeaume (b. 1956), mayor
- Audrey Lacroix (b. 1983), swimmer
- Guy Laliberté (b. 1959), businessman
- Claire Lamarche (b. 1945), television host
- Michel Lamarche (1947-2019), retired professional wrestler
- Stéphane Lapointe (b. 1971), film and television director
- Pierre Lavertu (b. 1990), football player
- François Lavoie (b. 1993), professional ten-pin bowler
- Marie-Renée Lavoie (b. 1974), writer
- Okill Massey Learmonth (1894-1917), winner of the Victoria Cross
- Félix Leclerc (1914-1988), musician
- Alice Lemieux-Lévesque (1905-1983), writer
- Robert Lepage (b. 1957), actor
- Jean Lesage (1912-1980), politician

== M ==
- Kurtis MacDermid (b. 1994), ice hockey player
- Norm Macdonald (1959-2021), comedian
- Simon Mailloux (b. 1983), Canadian Forces officer
- Joe Malone (1890-1969), early NHL player
- Michael Mando (b. 1981), actor
- Pauline Marois (b. 1949), politician and leader of the Parti Québécois
- Philippe Marquis (b. 1989), moguls skier
- Rick Martel (b. 1956), retired professional wrestler
- Pénélope McQuade (b. 1970), radio and television host
- Elizabeth Smith Middleton (1814–1898), social reformer
- Mitsou (b. 1970), pop singer
- François Morency (b. 1966), comedian
- Terry Mosher (b. 1942), cartoonist for the Montreal Gazette

== N ==
- Safia Nolin (b. 1992), singer-songwriter

== P ==
- Bruno Pelletier (b. 1962), musician
- François Pérusse (b. 1960), comedian
- Pierre Pettigrew (b. 1951), former politician, Canadian Minister of Foreign Affairs 2004-2006
- Jacques Poulin (1937–2025), writer
- Marc-Antoine Pouliot (b. 1985), NHL player

== R ==
- Manon Rhéaume (b. 1972), ice hockey goaltender
- Jacques Richard (1952–2002), NHL player
- Alys Robi (1923–2011), musician
- Ariane Roy (b. 1997), singer-songwriter
- Gabrielle Roy (1909–1983), writer
- Patrick Roy (b. 1965), NHL goaltender

== S ==
- Colette Samson (1923-1991), social activist
- Paul Stastny (b. 1985), NHL player
- Yan Stastny (b. 1982), former NHL player

== T ==
- Louis-Alexandre Taschereau (1867–1952), early Quebec politician
- Yves Thériault (1915–1983), writer
- Marie Tifo (b. 1949), actress
- Gabrielle Laïla Tittley (b. 1988), artist
- Roland Michel Tremblay (b. 1972), writer
- Gilles Turcot (1917–2010), Commander of the Canadian Army during the October Crisis
- Mélanie Turgeon (b. 1976), skier
- Richard Turner (1871–1961), winner of the Victoria Cross

== V ==
- Richard Verreau (1926-2005), musician
- Gilles Vigneault (b. 1928), musician

== W ==
- Mike Ward (b. 1973), comedian
- David Watson (1869-1922), army general
- Christian Wolanin (b. 1995), NHL player for Ottawa Senators

== Religious people ==
- Blessed Marie de l'Incarnation, née Marie Guyart (1599-1672)
- Blessed François de Laval (1623-1708), first bishop of New France and founder of Quebec Seminary
- Blessed Marie-Catherine de Saint-Augustin, née Catherine de Longpré (1632-1664)
- Saint Marguerite d'Youville (1701-1771), née Marie-Marguerite Dufrost de Lajemmerais
- Cardinal Marc Ouellet (b. 1944)
- Venerable Alfred Pampalon (1867-1896), C.Ss.R.
- Cardinal Elzéar-Alexandre Taschereau (1820-1898), first Canadian cardinal

== See also ==
- List of people from Quebec
- List of people from Montreal
- List of people from Laval, Quebec
- List of people from Ontario
- List of people from Ottawa
- List of people from Toronto
- List of people from Calgary
- List of people from Edmonton
- List of people from British Columbia
- List of people from Vancouver
