= List of people from Calgary =

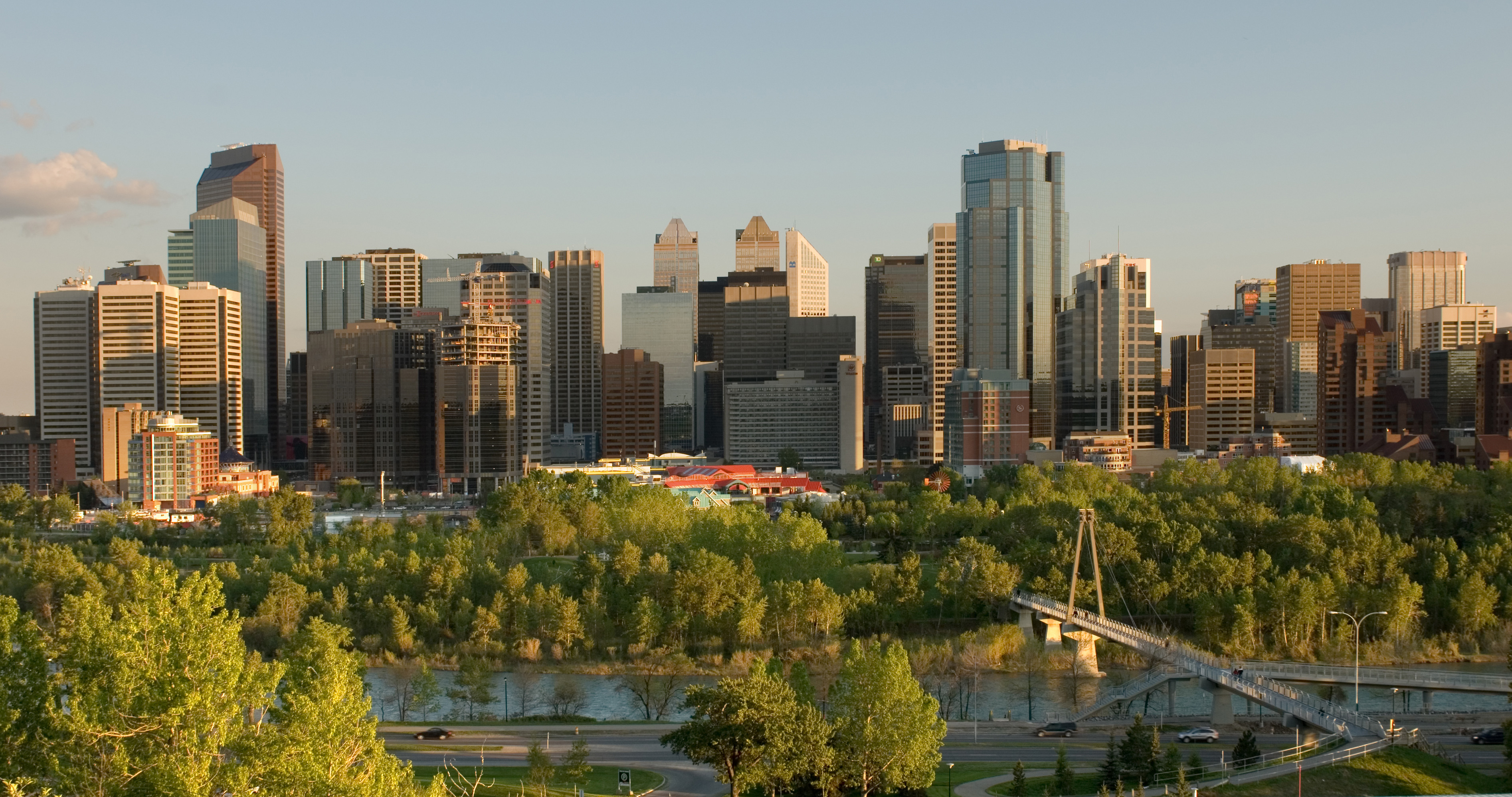
Calgary

This is a list of notable people who were born, or lived for a significant period of time, in Calgary, Alberta, Canada, ordered by last name:

== A ==
- William Aberhart (1878–1943), former Premier of Alberta
- Tesho Akindele (born 1992), soccer player
- David Albahari (1948–2023), Serbian born author who resided in Calgary 1994–2012
- Jocelyn Alice, vocalist for the soul pop duo Jocelyn & Lisa
- Cody Almond (born 1989), Canadian-born Swiss professional ice hockey centre
- Jaret Anderson-Dolan (born 1999), professional ice hockey centre for Brynäs IF
- Brooke Apshkrum (born 1999), luger
- Jann Arden (born 1962), singer
- William Charles Gordon Armstrong (1865–1951), real estate magnate and municipal politician
- Mark Astley (born 1969), former professional ice hockey player

== B ==
- Scott Bailey (born 1972), former professional ice hockey goaltender
- Cori Bartel (born 1971), curler
- Daniel Bartholomew-Poyser, orchestral conductor
- Bob Bassen (born 1965), former professional ice hockey centre
- Hank Bassen (1932–2009), professional ice hockey goaltender
- Nolan Baumgartner (born 1976), former professional ice hockey defenceman
- Ian Willoughby Bazalgette (1918–1944), Calgary-born recipient of the Victoria Cross for actions in the skies above France in the Second World War
- Jay Beagle (born 1985), former professional ice hockey centre
- Jake Bean (born 1998), professional ice hockey defenceman (UFA, most recently played for the Calgary Flames)
- Chelsey Bell (born 1982), curler
- Jill Belland, television host and producer
- Richard Bennett (1870–1947), former prime minister of Canada
- Cheryl Bernard (born 1966), curler
- Manmeet Bhullar (1980–2015), Progressive Conservative politician
- Earle Birney (1904–1995), poet
- Jason Block (born 1989), swimmer
- Heather Blush, singer
- Bruce Boa (1930–2004), actor
- Bill Borger (born 1974), first Canadian to both swim the English Channel and climb Mount Everest
- Noah Bowman (born 1992), freestyle skiing
- Trevor Boys (1957–2023), NASCAR driver
- Paul Brandt (born 1972), country music singer
- John Brocke (1953–2009), realist painter
- Annie Glen Broder (1857–1937), musician, writer and lecturer
- Dave Bronconnier (born 1962), politician
- Aanders Brorson (born 1988), American curler
- Anastasia Bucsis (born 1989), speed skater
- Nate Burleson (born 1981), professional American football player, Detroit Lions
- Pat Burns (1856–1937), rancher, businessman, and Canadian Senator
- Ron Butlin (1925–2014), ice hockey executive

== C ==
- Don Cairns (born 1955), professional ice hockey left wing
- Eric Cameron (1935-2026), visual artist
- Tommy Campbell (born 1978), actor and stand-up comedian
- Cartel Madras, hip-hop duo
- Sean Cheesman, dancer and choreographer
- David Chernushenko (born 1963), politician
- Dean Chynoweth (born 1968), ice hockey defenceman
- Aleisha Cline (born 1970), cross skier
- Allen Coage (1943–2007), professional wrestler known as "Bad News Allen"
- Samantha Cogan (born 1997), professional ice hockey forward for the Minnesota Frost
- Braydon Coburn (born 1985), former professional ice hockey defenceman
- Joe Colborne (born 1990), former professional ice hockey forward
- Jordan Connor (born 1991), actor, Riverdale
- Susanne Craig, journalist and reporter at the NYT
- Paul Cranmer (born 1969), former CFL player
- Ted Cruz (born 1970), U.S. senator for Texas and major presidential candidate in 2016; renounced Canadian citizenship in 2016
- Elisha Cuthbert (born 1982), actress, moved to Montreal at a very young age, and remained there until she moved to Los Angeles
- Mike Cvik (born 1962), former National Hockey League linesman

== D ==
- Nathan Dales, actor
- Carolyn Darbyshire (born 1963), curler
- Stu Davis (1921–2007), aka Canada's Cowboy Troubadour, home base was Calgary 1945–47; 51–56
- Carol-Anne Day (born 1986), voice actress
- Theo de Raadt (born 1968), founder and head of the OpenBSD project
- Nicholas Devlin, (born 1971) judge and lawyer
- Justin Dorey (born 1988), freestyle skier
- Bruce Dowbiggin, journalist for the Calgary Herald
- Michael Dowse (born 1973), film director
- Matt Dumba (born 1994), former professional ice hockey defenceman
- Kyle Bobby Dunn (born 1986), composer and musician, raised in Lake Bonavista and based in Brooklyn
- Micki DuPont (born 1980), former professional ice hockey defenceman
- Jacqueline Dupuis, executive director of Calgary International Film Festival
- Erica Durance (born 1978), actress, born in Calgary but raised in Three Hills
- Aaron Durley (born 1993), baseball and basketball player

== E ==
- Patrick Eaves (born 1984), Canadian-American former professional ice hockey forward
- Samuel Edney (born 1984), luger
- Esi Edugyan (born 1978), writer
- Travis Ehrhardt (born 1989), ice hockey defenceman
- Ophira Eisenberg (born 1972), comedian, writer, actress, and host of NPR quiz show Ask Me Another
- Malik Elassal (born 1996), comedian, actor
- Lindsay Ell (born 1989), singer
- Brennan Elliott (born 1975), actor
- Darren Espanto (born 2001), Filipino-Canadian child singer
- Shawn Everett (born 1982), Grammy-winning Canadian music engineer and producer
- Erik Everhard (born 1976), pornographic actor
- Lance Evers (born 1969), professional wrestler known as "Lance Storm"

== F ==
- John Fairbairn (born 1983), Olympic skeleton racer
- Leslie Feist (born 1976), singer-songwriter born in Amherst, Nova Scotia, then moved to Calgary as a child
- John Fennell (born 1995), luger
- Brandon Firla, actor
- Rhiannon Fish (born 1991), Canadian-born Australian actress
- Drew Fischer (born 1980), national and FIFA soccer referee
- George Fox (born 1960), country music singer-songwriter

== G ==
- Bill Gadsby (1927–2016), professional ice hockey defenceman
- Dutch Gainor (1904–1962), professional ice hockey forward
- TJ Galiardi (born 1988), Canadian-born American professional ice hockey forward
- William Garden (1918–2011), Canadian and American naval architect and marine engineer
- Ruth M. Gardiner (1914–1943), first nurse killed in action during World War II
- Karyn Garossino (born 1965), professional ice dancer with partner Rod Garossino
- Lynn Garrison (born 1937), aviator, author and mercenary
- Austin Gary (born 1947), author and songwriter
- Onalea Gilbertson, voice actress
- Jeff Glass (born 1985), former professional ice hockey goaltender
- John Glenn (1833–1886), Calgary's earliest recorded European settler
- James Gosling (born 1955), creator of the Java programming language
- Alex Gough (born 1987), luger
- Mike Green (born 1985), former professional ice hockey defenceman
- Mary Greene (1843–1933), mother superior and educator, established first Roman Catholic school board in Alberta
- Tyrel Griffith (born 1985), curler
- Rosalind Groenewoud (born 1989), freeskier
- Paul Gross (born 1959), actor
- Tom Garlepp (born 1986), Calgary-born Australian basketball player

== H ==
- John Hall (born 1943), artist
- Joice M. Hall (born 1943), artist
- Taylor Hall (born 1991), professional ice hockey forward for the Carolina Hurricanes
- Eric Hansen (born 1992), chess player
- Nicole Hare
- Owen Hargreaves (born 1981), professional footballer, played for Bayern Munich, Manchester United and Manchester City
- Stephen Harper (born 1959), former prime minister of Canada and former leader of the Conservative Party of Canada
- Richard Harrison, poet
- Bret Hart (born 1957), professional wrestler
- Owen Hart (1965–1999), professional wrestler
- Stu Hart (1915–2003), professional wrestler, promoter and trainer
- Teddy Hart (born 1980), professional wrestler
- Dany Heatley (born 1981), Swedish-born former professional ice hockey left wing
- Ben Hebert (born 1983), curler
- Stuart Hilborn (1917–2013), automotive engineer
- Makena Hodgson (born 2000), Olympic luger
- Greyston Holt (born 1985), actor
- Tony Holyoake (born 1946), darts player
- Kaillie Humphries (born 1985), bobsledder
- Tim Hunter (born 1960), former professional ice hockey player (won the Stanley Cup with the Calgary Flames in 1989)
- Nancy Huston (born 1953), novelist born in Calgary; left at age 15
- Bill Hutton (1910–1974), professional ice hockey defenceman
- Wayne Hynes (born 1969), Canadian-born German former professional ice hockey center

== I ==
- Kaylin Irvine (born 1990), speedskater

== J ==
- Tom Jackson (born 1948), Métis actor, singer and entrepreneur
- Connor James (born 1982), former professional ice hockey centre
- Roy Jenson (1927–2007), actor
- Arianne Jones (born 1990), luger
- Mark de Jonge (born 1984), sprint canoeist
- Gilmore Junio (born 1990), Olympic speedskater

== K ==
- James Keelaghan (born 1959), musician
- Jessica Parker Kennedy (born 1984), actress
- Tyson Kidd (born 1980), professional wrestler
- Kiesza (full name Kiesza Rae Ellestad) (born 1989), musician and multi-instrumentalist
- Lance Kinsey (born 1954), actor and screenwriter
- Yuri Kisil (born 1995), swimmer
- Ralph Klein (1942–2013), former mayor of Calgary and former Premier of Alberta
- Mark Knoll (born 1976), Olympic speedskater
- Cody Ko (born 1990), comedian and actor
- Jessica Kondas (Born 2000), professional ice hockey defender for the Toronto Sceptres
- Joe Kryczka (1934–1991), Justice of the Court of Queen's Bench of Alberta, president of the Canadian Amateur Hockey Association
- John Kucera (born 1984), alpine ski racer
- Larry Kwong (1923–2018), professional ice hockey forward and the first of Chinese descent to play in the National Hockey League
- Norman Kwong (1929–2016), CFL player and former Lieutenant Governor of Alberta

== L ==
- Brent Ladds (born 1951), president of the Canadian Junior Hockey League
- Kyle Landry (born 1986), basketball player
- Alvin Law (born 1960), motivational speaker
- Sheena Lawrick (born 1983), Olympic softball player
- Brett Leason (born 1999), ice hockey right wing for the San Jose Barracuda (under contract to the San Jose Sharks)
- Mireille Lebel, Canadian opera singer/soloist
- Brady Leman (born 1986), freestyle skier, 2018 Olympic gold medalist
- Herbie Lewis (1906–1991), professional ice hockey left wing
- Jan Lisiecki (born 1995), classical pianist
- Sam Livingston (1831–1897), Irish-born early settler in Calgary
- Keith Loach (born 1975), Canadian Olympic skeleton athlete 2006
- Oscar Lopez (born 1953), Latin guitarist musician
- James Alexander Lougheed (1854–1925), head of military hospitals during World War I
- Peter Lougheed (1928–2012), former CFL player and Premier of Alberta
- Wyatt C. Louis, singer-songwriter
- Alexandria Loutitt (born 2004), Canadian ski jumper and 2023 World Champion in ski jumping, large hill
- Lowell, electropop musician
- Ed Lukowich (born 1946), curler

== M ==
- Andrew MacWilliam (born 1990), professional ice hockey defenceman for HK Olimpija Ljubljana
- Jinder Mahal (born 1986), professional wrestler
- Cale Makar (born 1998), professional ice hockey defenceman for the Colorado Avalanche
- John Mann (1962–2019), lead singer of Canadian folk band Spirit of the West
- Ernest Manning (1908–1996), former Premier of Alberta
- Heather Marks (born 1988), supermodel
- Deb Matejicka, journalist
- Wayne McBean (born 1969), former professional ice hockey defenceman
- Frederick McCall (1896–1949), World War I fighter ace, businessman, stuntman
- Trent McClellan, comedian
- Nellie McClung (1873–1951), writer and activist
- Frank McCool (1918–1973), professional ice hockey goaltender
- Bruce McCulloch (born 1961), comedian, writer, director
- Todd McFarlane (born 1961), creator of the Spawn series of comics
- Brian McKeever (born 1979), paralympian skier and biathlete
- Kevin McKenna (born 1980), professional soccer player
- Rita McKeough (born 1951), visual artist
- Brent McMurtry (born 1986), cross-country skier
- Taylor McNallie (born 1990/1991), anti-racism activist
- Victor A. McPherson (born 1928), 27th Canadian Surgeon General
- Tate McRae (born 2003), singer and dancer
- Caitlynne Medrek (born 1989), professional actress and voice over artist
- Manjit Minhas (born 1980), entrepreneur, television personality and venture capitalist
- Martin P. Mintchev (born 1962), professor and entrepreneur
- Ricardo Miranda (born 1976), politician and trade unionist
- Eric Mitchell (born 1992), ski jumper
- Chris Moffat (born 1979), luger
- Mike Moffat (born 1982), luger
- Cory Monteith (1982–2013), singer and actor; born in Calgary but grew up in Vancouver
- Michelle Morgan (born 1981), actress and singer
- Trevor Morrice (born 1991), ski jumper
- Josh Morrissey (born 1995), professional ice hockey defenceman and alternate captain for the Winnipeg Jets
- Caia Morstad (born 1982), volleyball player
- Darren Moulding (born 1982), curler
- Erín Moure (born 1955), poet and translator
- Troy Murray (1962-2026), professional ice hockey centre
- Dana Murzyn (born 1966), former professional ice hockey defenceman
- Curtis Myden (born 1973), Olympic bronze medalist swimmer
- Tyler Myers (born 1990), professional ice hockey defenceman for the Dallas Stars

== N ==
- Issey Nakajima-Farran (born 1984), professional soccer player
- Natalie "Nattie" Neidhart (born 1982), professional wrestler
- Naheed Nenshi (born 1972), former mayor of Calgary
- Robert Nilsson (born 1985), Canadian-born Swedish former professional ice hockey forward
- Kyle Nissen (born 1979), freestyle skier
- Amy Nixon (born 1977), curler
- Henry Grattan Nolan (1893–1957), lawyer and soldier
- Rebecca Northan, actress
- Baldy Northcott (1908–1986), professional ice hockey left wing
- Lawrence Nycholat (born 1979), former professional ice hockey defenceman
- Alexander Nylander (born 1998), Canadian-born Swedish professional ice hockey forward
- William Nylander (born 1996), Canadian-born Swedish professional ice hockey forward

== O ==
- Susan O'Connor (born 1977), curler
- Steven Ogg (born 1973), actor
- Kevin Ogilvie (born 1962), vocalist for the Industrial music band Skinny Puppy
- Peter Oldring (born 1971), actor
- Dan Olson (born 1981 or 1982), YouTuber
- Melissa O'Neil (born 1988), actress in The Rookie, 2005 Canadian Idol winner
- Nicole Orford (born 1992), ice dancer

== P ==
- Kathleen Parlow (1890–1963), violinist
- Jim Peplinski (born 1960), former professional ice hockey right wing
- Chris Phillips (born 1978), former professional ice hockey defenceman
- Andrew Phung, actor best known for his role on Kim's Convenience
- Mardi Pieronek (born 1962), TikToker and transgender historian
- Gerry Pinder (born 1948), former professional ice hockey right wing
- Domenic Pittis (born 1974), former professional ice hockey centre
- Brian Pockar (1959–1992), figure skater
- Pierre Poilievre (born 1979), Canadian politician, leader of the Conservative Party of Canada and the Official Opposition
- Lanny Poffo (1954–2023), former professional wrestler
- Brayden Point (born 1996), professional ice hockey centre for the Tampa Bay Lightning
- Glenn Price, conductor
- Al Purvis (1929–2009), professional ice hockey defenceman

== Q ==
- Tegan and Sara Quin (both born 1980), aka indie-pop duo Tegan and Sara, best known for their work as professional musicians

== R ==
- Raghav (born 1981), singer-songwriter
- Lobsang Rampa (1910–1981), Tibetan lama
- Matt Rempe (born 2002), ice hockey centre for the New York Rangers
- Chris Reitsma (born 1977), professional baseball player
- Michelle Rempel Garner (born 1980), Canadian politician
- Nick Ring (born 1979), professional MMA fighter UFC
- Kayla Rivera (born 1991), singer
- Chris Robanske (born 1989), snowboarder
- Mat Robinson (born 1986), former professional ice hockey defenceman
- Steve Rodehutskors (1963–2007), football player
- Mike Rogers (born 1954), former professional ice hockey centre
- Mark Rypien (born 1962), Super Bowl XXVI MVP

== S ==
- Jamie Salé (born 1977), Olympic gold medalist skater
- Frank Sandercock (1887–1942), president of the Canadian Amateur Hockey Association
- Riza Santos (born 1987), Miss Universe Canada 2013
- Willie Saunders (1915–1986), Montana-born Hall of Fame jockey, won U.S. Triple Crown
- Andrew Schnell (born 1991), squash player
- Jeff Schultz (born 1986), former professional ice hockey defenceman
- Mary Scott (born 1948), visual artist
- Roshan Sethi, film director and physician
- Jairus Sharif, jazz musician
- Patrick Sharp (born 1981), Winnipeg-born former professional ice hockey left wing, Philadelphia Flyers special advisor to hockey operations as of 2023
- Cassie Sharpe (born 1992), freestyle skier
- Kyle Shewfelt (born 1982), gymnast; Olympic gold medalist
- Hunter Shinkaruk (born 1994), former professional ice hockey forward
- Warren Shouldice (born 1983), freestyle skier
- Earl Silverman (1948–2013), domestic abuse survivor and men's rights advocate
- Rhonda Sing (1961–2001), professional wrestler
- Julie Skinner (born 1968), curler and Olympic medalist
- Laurie Skreslet (born 1949), first Canadian to climb Mount Everest
- Lorna Slater (born 1975), Member of the Scottish Parliament and co-leader of the Scottish Green Party
- Tyler Sloan (born 1981), former professional ice hockey defenceman
- Danielle Smith (born 1971), Premier of Alberta
- Davey Boy Smith Jr. (born 1985), professional wrestler
- Jason Smith (born 1973), former professional ice hockey defenceman
- Nathan Smith (born 1985), biathlete
- Justin Snith (born 1991), luger
- Monte Solberg (born 1958), Conservative politician
- Brent Sopel (born 1977), former professional ice hockey defenceman
- Mike Soroka (born 1997), professional baseball pitcher
- Ron Southern (1930–2016), businessman and founder of Spruce Meadows
- Brad Spence (born 1984), alpine skier
- Paul Spence, actor, portrays headbanger Dean Murdoch in FUBAR
- George Stanley (1907–2002), designer of the current Canadian flag
- Fiona Staples, comic book artist
- Stan Stephens (1929–2021), Canadian-American politician, former Governor of Montana
- Ron Stewart (1932–2012), professional ice hockey right wing
- Riley Stillman (born 1998), professional ice hockey defenceman for the Bakersfield Condors (while under contract to the Edmonton Oilers)
- Charlie Storwick (born 1998), actress in Some Assembly Required; musician

== T ==
- Jeff Tambellini (born 1984), former professional ice hockey left wing
- Ari Taub (born 1971), Olympic Greco-Roman wrestler
- Ken Taylor (1934–2015), Canadian ambassador to Iran; helped six Americans escape from Iran during the Iran hostage crisis under operation nicknamed Canadian Caper
- Mark Tewksbury (born 1968), Olympic gold medalist swimmer
- Robert Thirsk (born 1953), astronaut
- Paul Thompson (1906–1991), professional ice hockey left wing
- Fikayo Tomori (born 1997), footballer (A.C. Milan)
- Michael Twoyoungmen, member of Canada's First Nations (the Tsuu T'ina)

== U ==
- Andrew Unger (born 1979), writer
- Garry Unger (born 1947), former professional ice hockey centre

== V ==
- Shaun Van Allen (born 1967), former professional ice hockey centre
- Alan van Sprang (born 1971), actor
- Chad VanGaalen (born 1977), musician
- Elisabeth Vathje (born 1994), skeleton racer
- Mike Vernon (born 1963), former professional ice hockey goaltender (won the Stanley Cup with the Calgary Flames in 1989)

== W ==
- Austin Wagner (born 1997), professional ice hockey left wing for the Frankfurt Lions
- Tristan Walker (born 1991), luger
- John Ware (1845–1905), pioneer rancher
- Bronwen Webster (born 1978), curler
- Crystal Webster (born 1975), curler
- Victor Webster (born 1973), actor
- Trevor White (born 1984), alpine skier
- Ozzy Wiesblatt (born 2002), professional ice hockey right wing for the Milwaukee Admirals (under contract to the Nashville Predators)
- Thomas Williams (born 1991), ice dancer
- Anna Mae Wills (born 1982), actress
- TJ Wilson (born 1980), professional wrestler also known by his ring name as Tyson Kidd
- David Winning (born 1961), film and television director, Stargate: Atlantis, Andromeda, Syfy Channel movies
- Cory Woron (born 1969), sports anchor, The Sports Network
- Jim Wych (born 1954), sports announcer and former professional snooker and pocket billiards player

== Y ==
- Blair Palmer Yoxall, writer

== See also ==
- List of people from Edmonton
- List of people from Laval, Quebec
- List of people from Montreal
- List of people from Quebec City
- List of people from Toronto
- List of people from Vancouver
