= Lists of people from Quebec =

These are lists of people from Quebec.

== Lists ==
- List of Anglo-Quebecer musicians
- List of comedians from Quebec
- List of English-speaking Quebecers
- List of Irish Quebecers
- List of musicians from Quebec
- List of people from Laval, Quebec
- List of people from Longueuil
- List of people from Mauricie
- List of people from Montreal
- List of people from Quebec City
- List of people from Quebec
- List of people from Saguenay–Lac-Saint-Jean
- List of people from Sherbrooke
- List of people from the Gaspé Peninsula
- List of presidents of the Saint-Jean-Baptiste Society of Montreal
- List of Quebec actors
- List of Quebec architects
- List of Quebec film directors
- List of rectors of Université Laval
- List of Roman Catholic archbishops of Quebec
- List of the 108 Lower Canadians prosecuted before the general court-martial of Montreal in 1838–39
- List of writers from Quebec

== See also ==
- List of regions of Quebec
- Quebec
