= List of people from Saguenay–Lac-Saint-Jean =

This is a list of people from the Saguenay-Lac-Saint-Jean region of Quebec.

- Samuel Archibald - writer
- Angine de Poitrine - band
- Michel Barrette - comedian
- Jean-Pierre Blackburn - Conservative Party MP
- Gérard Bouchard - historian
- Lucien Bouchard - Premier of Quebec
- Joanne Corneau aka Corno - painter
- Guillaume Côté - ballet dancer
- Michel Côté - actor
- Jeff Fillion - radio host
- Gilbert Fillion - Bloc Québécois Member of Parliament
- Dédé Fortin - singer-songwriter
- Jeanick Fournier - singer and Canada's Got Talent season 2 winner
- Christiane Gagnon - politician
- Francesca Gagnon - singer-songwriter and actress
- Marc Gagnon - short track speed skater
- Rémy Girard - actor
- Michel Goulet - former NHL hockey player
- Rafaël Harvey-Pinard - NHL hockey player
- Charles Hudon - NHL hockey player
- Régis Labeaume - Mayor of Ville de Québec
- Pauline Lapointe - actress
- Pierre Lapointe - singer
- Plume Latraverse - singer
- Pauline Martin - actress
- Guillaume Morissette - writer
- Louise Portal - actress
- René Simard - singer
- Marie Tifo - actress
- Jean Tremblay - Mayor of Ville de Saguenay; TV personality
- Mario Tremblay - former NHL player and head coach
- Roland Michel Tremblay - author, poet, scriptwriter
- Stéphan Tremblay - Bloc Québécois MP and Parti Québécois MNA
- Georges Vézina - hockey player
- Annie Villeneuve - singer
- Élisabeth Vonarburg - sci-fi writer

== See also ==
- Lists of people from Quebec by region
- List of Quebecers
- List of Quebec regions
