= List of people from Quebec =

Provincial flag of Quebec

Map and location of Quebec in Canada

This is a list of notable people who are from Quebec, Canada, or have spent a large part or formative part of their career in that province.

== Anchors ==
- Kim Brunhuber, former CBC anchor / CNN newscaster journalist broadcaster
- Pierre Bruneau, TVA
- Nathalie Chung, RDI / SRC
- Bernard Derome, SRC / RDI
- Simon Durivage, RDI / SRC
- Céline Galipeau, SRC / RDI
- Bill Haugland, CTV
- Jean-Luc Mongrain, TQS, TVA
- Pascale Nadeau, SRC
- Mutsumi Takahashi, CTV
- Sophie Thibault, TVA
- Todd van der Heyden, CTV

== Artists and entertainers ==
- Angine de Poitrine, experimental rock duo
- Denys Arcand, screenwriter and director
- Paul Arcand, radio personality and cinematographer
- Gilles Archambault, novelist and commentator
- André Arthur, radio personality, independent federal MP
- Eva Avila, singer
- Rachid Badouri, comedian
- René Balcer, film and TV writer and producer
- Raoul Barré, inventor, cartoonist and animator of the silent film era
- Michel Barrette, stand-up comedian, actor
- Jay Baruchel, actor, director, writer
- Victor-Lévy Beaulieu, author
- Daniel Bélanger, singer
- Marie-Claire Blais, author
- Paul Bley, jazz pianist and composer
- Lothaire Bluteau, actor
- La Bolduc, singer
- Paul-Émile Borduas, abstract painter
- Isabelle Boulay, singer
- Gerry Boulet, singer-songwriter
- Claudia Bouvette, singer-songwriter and actress
- Pierre Bouvier, lead singer of Simple Plan
- Glenda Braganza, actress
- Michel Brault, cinematographer, pioneer of the esthetic of handheld camera, director, producer
- Geneviève Bujold, actress
- Pascale Bussières, actress
- Win Butler, singer-songwriter
- Jean Carignan, fiddler
- Roch Carrier, author
- Charles Carson, painter
- Robert Charlebois, singer-songwriter
- Régine Chassagne, singer-songwriter, and instrumentalist from Arcade Fire
- Coeur de Pirate born Béatrice Martin, pianist, singer-songwriter
- Leonard Cohen, poet, author and songwriter
- Steven Crowder, comedian, political commentator, child voice actor (born in Michigan, raised in Quebec; mother is French Canadian)
- Marie-Josée Croze, actress
- Peter Cullen, voice actor
- Chuck Comeau, drummer and singer
- Elisha Cuthbert, actress (born in Alberta, raised in Quebec)
- Sylvia Daoust, sculptor
- Charles Daudelin, sculptor
- Esther Delisle, historian and author
- Yvon Deschamps, author and comedian
- Céline Dion, singer
- Xavier Dolan, actor, director, screenwriter, editor, costume designer, and voice actor
- Georges Dor, chansonnier, songwriter, author, playwright
- Hélène Dorion, poet
- Fifi D'Orsay, actress
- Jean Duceppe, comedian
- Francis Ducharme, actor and dancer
- Quilla, singer-songwriter
- Louis Dudek, poet and literary critic
- Diane Dufresne, singer and painter
- Roy Dupuis, actor
- Marcelle Ferron, glazier
- Jennifer Finnigan, actress
- Serge Fiori, singer-songwriter
- Glenn Ford, actor
- Garou, singer
- Mitsou Gélinas, pop star, radio and TV host, actress
- Jean-Claude Germain, playwright, author
- Huntley Gordon, actor
- Pierre Granche, sculptor
- Bruce Greenwood, actor, producer
- Sylvain Grenier, professional wrestler
- Anne Hébert, poet and novelist
- Prudence Heward, painter
- Airat Ichmouratov, composer and orchestra conductor
- Pierre Jalbert, actor, champion skier and film editor
- Will James, artist and writer of the American West
- René Jodoin, animator, director and producer
- Oliver Jones, jazz pianist
- Claude Jutra, director, actor
- Florence La Badie, actress
- Éric Lapointe, singer
- Pierre Lapointe, singer
- Stéphanie Lapointe, singer
- Marie-Thérèse Lasselle painter
- Carole Laure, singer, actress
- Lucie Laurier, actress
- Daniel Lavoie, singer-songwriter and actor (born in Manitoba, active in Quebec)
- Louise Lecavalier, dancer
- Félix Leclerc, poet and songwriter
- Jean Leloup, singer
- Félix Lengyel, Twitch streamer and former professional player in the Overwatch League
- Robert Lepage, playwright, actor and film director
- Édouard Lock, choreographer
- Norm Macdonald, actor, comedian
- Marie-Mai Bouchard, singer
- Marilou Bourdon, singer
- André Mathieu, pianist and composer
- Norman McLaren, director, animator
- Guido Molinari, abstract painter
- Edythe Morahan de Lauzon, poet
- Jean-Paul Mousseau, muralist
- Ben Mulroney, television personality; son of Brian
- Émile Nelligan, poet
- Maryse Ouellet, wrestler
- P. Reign, hip hop artist (born in Quebec, raised in Ontario)
- Michel Pagliaro, singer-sonwriter and guitarist
- Kevin Parent, singer-songwriter
- Bruno Pelletier, singer
- Pierre Perrault, documentarist, poet
- Oscar Peterson, jazz pianist
- Luc Plamondon, songwriter
- Mordecai Richler, author
- Jean-Paul Riopelle, painter
- Michel Rivard, singer-songwriter
- Michael Sarrazin, actor
- Anne Savage, painter
- Mack Sennett, director
- William Shatner, actor
- Douglas Shearer, sound director, designer
- Norma Shearer, actress
- René Simard, singer, TV show host
- Devon Soltendieck, television personality
- Eva Tanguay, singer, vaudeville star
- Miyuki Tanobe, painter
- Diane Tell, singer-songwriter
- Marie-Élaine Thibert, singer
- Michel Tremblay, playwright, author
- Roland Michel Tremblay, author, poet, scriptwriter
- Armand Vaillancourt, sculptor, performance artist, social activist
- Pierre Vallières, author, political activist
- Gino Vannelli, singer and composer
- Gilles Vigneault, poet and songwriter
- Annie Villeneuve, singer
- Arthur Villeneuve, painter
- Denis Villeneuve, director
- Mike Ward, comedian
- Andrée Watters, singer
- Hal Willis born Leonald Francis Gauthier, singer

== Business ==
- H. Montagu Allan, businessman
- Hugh Allan, shipping company operator
- Laurent Beaudoin, CEO of Bombardier
- Conrad Black, media mogul
- Charles Bronfman, investor, developer
- Edgar Bronfman, Sr., investor, distiller
- Samuel Bronfman, distiller
- Donald J. Carty, airline executive
- André Chagnon, entrepreneur and philanthropist
- Thomas Cleeve, food producer
- Jean Coutu, retail pharmacy chain
- Alphonse Desjardins, father of credit unions in America
- Marie-Josée Drouin, economist
- Alexander Galt, businessman, statesman
- Mitch Garber, gaming, hotel executive, philanthropist
- Guy Laliberté, founder of Cirque du Soleil
- Bernard Lemaire, businessman and engineer
- Jean-Louis Lévesque, financier
- William Christoper Macdonald, tobacco manufacturer, philanthropist
- John Wilson McConnell, publisher, philanthropist
- James McGill, fur trader, real estate investor
- Hartland Molson, brewer, sportsman, statesman
- John Molson, brewer, transportation pioneer
- Pierre Péladeau, media mogul
- John Redpath, developer, opened first sugar refinery in Canada
- Denis Stairs, Chairman, Montreal Engineering Co.
- Sam Steinberg, grocery store magnate
- Donald Tarlton, record producer, promoter

== Politicians ==
- John Abbott
- Adrien Arcand
- André Boisclair
- Lucien Bouchard
- Andrée Boucher
- Henri Bourassa
- Robert Bourassa
- Pierre Bourgault
- George-Étienne Cartier, a father of the Canadian Confederation
- Thérèse Casgrain
- Jean Charest
- Jean Chrétien, 20th Prime Minister of Canada
- Irwin Cotler
- Jean Drapeau
- Pierre Ducasse
- Gilles Duceppe
- Maurice Duplessis
- Ludger Duvernay
- Francis Fox
- Steven Guilbeault
- Lomer Gouin
- Michaëlle Jean, Governor General of Canada
- Daniel Johnson, Sr.
- Régis Labeaume
- Louis-Hippolyte Lafontaine
- Bernard Landry
- Hector-Louis Langevin, a father of the Canadian Confederation
- Pierre Laporte
- Wilfrid Laurier
- Jean Lesage
- René Lévesque
- Yolette Lévy
- John Lynch-Staunton
- Sean Patrick Maloney, Canadian/American politician and U.S. Representative for the state of New York since 2013; naturalized U.S. citizen
- Pauline Marois
- Manon Massé
- Thomas D'Arcy McGee, a father of the Canadian Confederation
- Honoré Mercier
- Yves Michaud
- Brian Mulroney, 18th Prime Minister of Canada and father of etalk host Ben Mulroney
- Gabriel Nadeau-Dubois
- John Neilson
- Robert Nelson
- Wolfred Nelson
- Edmund Bailey O'Callaghan
- Louis-Joseph Papineau
- Jacques Parizeau
- Claude Ryan
- Louis Stephen St-Laurent
- Étienne-Paschal Taché, a father of the Canadian Confederation
- Louis-Alexandre Taschereau
- Daniel Tracey
- Pierre Elliott Trudeau, 15th Prime Minister of Canada; father of 23rd Prime Minister Justin Trudeau
- François Legault

== Sciences ==
- Sidney Altman, Nobel Prize winner
- Daniel Borsuk, plastic surgeon, first Canadian to perform face transplant
- Pierre Dansereau, father of ecology
- Paul David, cardiologist
- George Mercer Dawson, scientist
- Reginald Fessenden, inventor
- Armand Frappier, researcher in microbiology and immunology
- Marc Garneau, astronaut, first Quebecer and Canadian in space, Minister of Transportation, Minister of Foreign Affairs
- David H. Levy, astronomer
- William Edmond Logan, geologist
- Rudolph A. Marcus, 1992 Nobel Prize in Chemistry
- Henry Morgentaler, physician, abortion-rights activist, president of Humanist Association of Canada
- Julie Payette, astronaut, first Quebec woman in space, Governor General of Canada
- Wilder Penfield, neurosurgeon, medical scientist
- Simon Plouffe, mathematician and discoverer of the BBP formula
- Hubert Reeves, astrophysicist
- Hans Selye, inventor of the concept of physiological stress
- Henri Wittmann, linguist
- David Saint-Jacques, astronaut

== Sports ==
- Jennifer Abel, diver
- Dave Abelson (born 1975), tennis player
- Jasey-Jay Anderson, snowboarder
- Sebastien Toutant, snowboarder
- Joel Anthony, basketball player
- Alex Anthopoulos, baseball manager
- Myriam Bédard, biathlete, Olympic gold medalist
- Josée Bélanger, soccer player, Olympic bronze medalist
- Tanith Belbin, figureskater
- Jean Béliveau, ice hockey player
- Chris Benoît, professional wrestler
- Khem Birch, basketball player
- Mike Bossy, ice hockey player
- Eugenie Bouchard (born 1994), professional tennis player
- Gaétan Boucher, speed skater
- Ray Bourque, ice hockey player
- Patrice Bergeron-Cleary, ice hockey player
- Adam Braz (born 1981), soccer player and Technical Director of the Montreal Impact of Major League Soccer
- Martin Brodeur, ice hockey goalie
- Marc-Olivier Brouillette, professional football player
- Hy Buller (1926–1968), All Star NHL ice hockey player
- Dayana Cadeau, Haitian-born Canadian American professional bodybuilder
- Gabrielle Carle soccer player
- Patrick Carpentier, IRL race car driver
- Maude Charron, weightlifter
- Samuel Dalembert, basketball player
- Jason Demers (born 1988), ice hockey player
- Éric Desjardins, ice hockey player
- Étienne Desmarteau, Olympic athlete
- Alexandre Despatie, diver
- Marcel Dionne, ice hockey player
- Luguentz Dort, basketball player
- Chris Duarte
- Steve Dubinsky (born 1970), ice hockey player
- Terry Farnsworth (born 1942), Olympic judoka
- Leylah Fernandez, tennis player
- Marc-André Fleury, ice hockey player
- Gottfried Fuchs (1889–1972), German-Canadian Olympic soccer player
- Éric Gagné, baseball player
- Marc Gagnon, short-track speed skater
- Arturo Gatti, boxer
- Bernie "Boom Boom" Geoffrion, ice hockey player
- Doug Harvey, ice hockey player
- Émilie Heymans, diver
- Alex Hilton, boxer
- Dave Hilton Jr., boxer
- Matthew Hilton, boxer
- Garry Kallos (born 1956), wrestler and sambo competitor
- Guy Lafleur (1951–2022), ice hockey player
- Sébastien Lareau, professional tennis player
- René Lecavalier, broadcaster
- Vincent Lecavalier, ice hockey player
- Cathy LeFrançois, IFBB professional bodybuilder
- Mario Lemieux, ice hockey player
- Kris Letang, ice hockey player
- Roberto Luongo, ice hockey player
- Joe Malone, ice hockey player
- Rick Martel, professional wrestler
- Rick Martin, ice hockey player
- Russell Martin, baseball player
- Marie-Eve Nault, soccer player, olympic bronze medalist
- Maryse Ouellet, professional wrestler, Former WWE Divas Champion
- Kevin Owens, professional wrestler, Former WWE Universal Champion
- Cory Pecker (born 1981), ice hockey player
- Gilbert Perreault, ice hockey player
- Chantal Petitclerc, wheelchair racer
- Rocco Placentino, soccer player
- Jacques Plante, ice hockey goalie
- Manon Rhéaume, ice hockey goalie
- Henri Richard, ice hockey player
- Maurice Richard, ice hockey player
- René Robert, ice hockey player
- Yvon Robert, professional wrestler
- Jacques Rougeau, professional wrestler
- Patrick Roy, ice hockey goalie
- Eliezer Sherbatov (born 1991), Canadian-Israeli ice hockey player
- Martin St. Louis, ice hockey player
- Lance Stroll (born 1998), Formula 1 Driver
- Georges St-Pierre, former UFC Welterweight Champion of the world
- Ronnie Stern (born 1967), ice hockey player
- Howard Stupp (born 1955), Olympic wrestler
- Ari Taub (born 1971), Olympic Greco-Roman wrestler
- Donald Theetge, racecar driver
- José Théodore, ice hockey goaltender
- Charles Thiffault (born 1939), NHL ice hockey coach
- Maurice Vachon, professional wrestler
- Gilles Villeneuve, F1 race car driver
- Jacques Villeneuve, F1 race car driver; son of Gilles Villeneuve
- Edson Warner, Olympian, marksman
- Brian Wilks (born 1966), NHL hockey player
- Rhian Wilkinson, soccer player, two times Olympic bronze medalist
- Bernie Wolfe (born 1951), NHL hockey player
- Gump Worsley, ice hockey player
- Aleksandra Wozniak, tennis player
- Larry "Rock" Zeidel (1928–2014), ice hockey player

== Other ==
- Louise Arbour, Supreme Court Justice (The Hague and Canada)
- André Bessette, thaumaturge and founder of the St-Joseph's Oratory
- Jean Blouf, colonist
- Henri Raymond Casgrain, priest, author, historian
- Michel Chartrand, union leader and left-wing activist
- Lauren Chen, conservative political commentator and former YouTuber
- George Comer, polar explorer
- Ernest Cormier, architect
- Aurélie Crépeau, nun, founded the Grey Nuns of Nicolet, established the Hôtel-Dieu De Nicolet
- Louis Cyr, strongman
- Micheline Dumont (historian), historian, professor emeritus
- Northrop Frye, academic and literary critic
- Lionel Groulx, priest, historian
- René Marc Jalbert, soldier and hero of 1984 shooting at the National Assembly of Quebec
- Louis Joliet, explorer
- Madeleine Juneau, museologist, teacher, nun
- Jean-Baptiste Kelly, vicar-general
- Antoine Labelle, priest and builder
- Régine Laurent, trade unionist
- Zoé Laurier, wife of Prime Minister Wilfrid Laurier
- Paul-Émile Léger, Roman Catholic cardinal
- Lyse Lemieux, Chief Justice of the Superior Court of Quebec
- René Lepage de Ste-Claire, lord-founder of Rimouski
- Bernard Lonergan, SJ, Jesuit priest, philosopher, theologian
- Simon Mailloux, first Canadian soldier with an amputation to deploy on a combat mission
- Jos Montferrand, French-Canadian hero
- Édouard Montpetit, lawyer, economist, scholar
- Bruno Pauletto, physiologist, shot putter, businessman, coach, author
- Mélanie Paquin, beauty pageant winner
- Hélène Pelletier-Baillargeon, journalist and writer
- Pacifique Plante, crime-fighting lawyer
- Joseph-Octave Plessis, archbishop
- Roméo Sabourin, SOE agent, executed by the Nazis
- Charles de Salaberry, soldier
- Charles Taylor, philosopher
- Marie-Louise Meilleur, oldest verified Canadian person in history
- Julie Surprenant, woman who mysteriously disappeared in 1999

== See also ==
- Lists of people from Quebec by region
- List of people from Quebec City
- List of people from Montreal
- List of people from Laval, Quebec
- List of writers from Quebec
- List of Quebec musicians
- List of Quebec film directors
- List of Quebec actors
- List of Quebec comedians
- List of English-speaking Quebecers
- List of Irish Quebecers
- National Order of Quebec
- Québécois people
- Scots-Quebecer
- List of Acadians
- List of people from British Columbia
- List of people from Calgary
- List of people from Edmonton
- List of people from Ontario
- List of people from Toronto
- List of people from Vancouver
- List of people from Winnipeg
