= List of people from Vancouver =

Notable people from Vancouver, Canada

This is a list of notable people from, or who spent considerable time residing in, Vancouver, British Columbia, Canada.

== A ==
- Alistair Abell, actor
- Joey Albert, singer and songwriter
- Alison Acheson, writer
- Mark Acheson, voice actor
- Daniel Adair, musician and member of rock band Nickelback
- Bryan Adams, singer
- Caroline Adderson, writer
- Fardaws Aimaq, basketball player
- Robert Campbell Aitken, electrical engineer
- Vikky Alexander, artist
- Glenn Anderson, NHL hockey player
- Pamela Anderson, actress
- Aslam Anis, health economist
- Sean Anthony, basketball player
- Danny Antonucci, animator and creator of Ed Edd N Eddy
- Omer Arbel, multidisciplinary artist and designer, co-founder of Bocci
- Arteezy, professional Dota 2 player

== B ==
- Neeru Bajwa, actress
- Peter Bakonyi (1933–1997), Hungarian-born Canadian Olympic fencer
- Long John Baldry (1941–2005), actor and musician
- Fairuza Balk, actress
- Ashleigh Ball, voice actress known for her lead role in My Little Pony: Friendship Is Magic and lead singer of Hey Ocean!
- Joan Balzar, painter
- James Barber (1923–2007), cookbook author, aka "The Urban Peasant"
- Jean Barman, historian
- Emery Barnes, politician, football player
- Kathleen Barr, voice actress
- Dave Barrett, 26th premier of British Columbia
- bbno$, recording artist
- Barry Beck, hockey player
- Connor Bedard, ice hockey player
- Gil Bellows, actor
- Vicki Berner (1945–2017), tennis player
- Ray Bethell (1928–2008), master multiple kite flier
- Jean-Luc Bilodeau, actor
- Bill Bissett, poet
- Molly Lamb Bobak, teacher, writer, and artist
- AC Bonifacio, dancer
- Linwood Boomer, actor and television producer and writer
- Andrea Botez, chess player and internet personality
- Eddy Boudel Tan, writer
- George Bowering, poet, novelist, critic
- Lynda Boyd, actress
- Angelo Branca, judge in British Columbia's Supreme Court, boxing champion
- Sage Brocklebank, actor
- Troy Brouwer, NHL hockey player
- Rosemary Brown, politician
- Rod Bruno, musician
- Karin Bubaš, artist
- Michael Bublé, singer
- Hy Buller (1926–1968), All Star NHL ice hockey player
- Shane Bunting (Madchild), rapper
- Brendan Burke, athlete and LGBT activist
- Jim Byrnes, musician, actor

== C ==
- Alexander Calvert, actor
- Jaime Callica, dancer and actor
- Kim Campbell, former Canadian Prime Minister
- Paul Campbell, actor
- Siobhan Carroll, professor, scholar and writer
- Anna Cathcart, actress
- Erin Cebula, TV personality
- Macklin Celebrini, NHL hockey player
- Erica Cerra, actress
- Garry Chalk, actor
- Sarah Chalke, actress
- Alina Chan, biologist
- Angela Chang, Mandopop singer
- Peter Chao, comedian
- Osric Chau, actor
- Edison Chen, Hong Kong entertainer
- Ying Chen, Francophone author
- Fred Cheng, Hong Kong actor, musician
- Joyce Cheng, actress
- Kevin Cherkas, chef
- Kayi Cheung, actress, Miss Hong Kong 2007
- Charlene Choi, actress and singer
- Mimi Choi, makeup artist
- Edward (Woo-Shik) Choi, actor
- Denise Chong, writer, economist
- Kevin Chong, novelist
- Tommy Chong, actor, comedian, musician
- Wayson Choy, writer
- Hayden Christensen, actor
- Frances Chung, ballet dancer
- Linda Chung, actress, musician
- Christy Clark, provincial politician and former Premier of British Columbia
- Jessica Leigh Clark-Bojin, artist and chef
- Brandon Clarke, NBA former player for the Memphis Grizzlies (1996-2026)
- Meredith Coloma, luthier and musician
- Wayde Compton, author
- Torrance Coombs, actor
- Claire Corlett, actress and daughter of Ian James Corlett
- Moses B. Cotsworth, political reformer, inventor of the International Fixed Calendar and 13-month calendar reformer
- Douglas Coupland, author
- Christian Covington, National Football League player
- Richard Ian Cox, actor
- Michelle Creber, actress, singer-songwriter, dancer
- Amanda Crew, actress
- Roger Cross, Jamaican-Canadian actor
- Eliana Cuevas, jazz Latin singer
- Seán Cummings, actor and playwright

== D ==
- Alphonso Davies, Bundesliga soccer player for FC Bayern Munich
- Mackenzie Davis, actress
- Peter Davis (British director), documentary filmmaker
- Brian Day, doctor
- Yvonne De Carlo (1922–2007), actress, dancer, singer of Hollywood's Golden Age
- Haley de Jong, gymnast for the Georgia Gymdogs
- Jay DeMerit, MLS, World Cup soccer player
- Charles Demers, comedian, voice actor, writer
- Katherine DeMille (1911–1995), actress of Hollywood's Golden Age
- Neil Denis, actor
- Trevor Devall, voice actor
- Dana Devine, blood transfusion researcher
- Ranj Dhaliwal, writer
- Michele Di Menna (born 1980), artist
- Brian Dobson, voice actor
- Michael Dobson, voice actor
- Paul Dobson, voice actor
- Lexa Doig, actress
- Michael Donovan, voice actor
- James Doohan (1920–2005), actor ("Lt. Cmdr. Montgomery Scott "Scotty" from television show Star Trek)
- Audrey Capel Doray, artist
- Stan Douglas, artist
- Brian Drummond, voice actor
- Terry Dunfield, soccer coach, commentator and former player
- Jacqueline Dupuis, executive director of Vancouver International Film Festival

== E ==
- Aileen Eaton, boxing promoter
- Aryana Engineer, actress
- Arthur Erickson, architect, urban planner
- Robin Esrock, travel writer
- William Esson, Chief Justice of the B.C. Supreme Court
- Elise Estrada, singer-songwriter, actress
- Daniella Evangelista, actress, model
- EKKSTACY, Singer, Producer

== F ==
- Isaiah Faber, rapper, songwriter, and record producer
- Bruce Fairbairn, musician, producer
- Jessie Farrell, singer
- Wally Fawkes, (1924–2023), jazz clarinetist and satirical cartoonist
- Gordon Fee, New Testament scholar
- Sam Feldman, music executive
- John Ferguson Sr., professional hockey player and executive
- Jodelle Ferland, actress
- Nathan Fielder, comedian
- Rod Filbrandt, cartoonist
- Nigel Findley, fantasy, science fiction, and RPG author
- Noel Fisher, actor
- Ben Fisk, soccer player
- Brendan Fletcher, actor
- Nathan Fong, chef
- Frazey Ford, singer-songwriter
- Luke Ford, actor
- Joe Fortes, lifeguard, Citizen of the Century
- William Wasbrough Foster, mountaineer, soldier, politician, business executive, and chief constable of Vancouver
- Michael J. Fox, actor, philanthropist, founder of Michael J. Fox Foundation for Parkinson's Research
- Andrew Francis, voice actor
- Daniel Francis, writer and historian
- Jeff Francis, Major League Baseball player
- Leonard Frank, photographer
- Robert Friedland, mining magnate
- Rhys Fulber, musician, producer
- Freddy Fuller, boxing champion
- Nolan Gerard Funk, actor

== G ==
- Catherine Galliford, police officer
- Emmanuelle Schick Garcia, film director and writer
- Austin Gary, author, songwriter
- C. E. Gatchalian, playwright
- Dan George, actor and chief
- Bruno Gerussi, actor
- William Gibson, writer
- Shelley Gillen, producer, screenwriter and songwriter
- Greg Girard, photographer
- Evan Goldberg, writer, producer and director
- Leah Goldstein (born 1969), Canadian-Israeli professional road racing cyclist winner of the Race Across America, World Bantamweight Kickboxing Champion, and Israel Duathlon national champion
- Matthew Good, singer-songwriter
- Rodney Graham, artist
- Jennifer Granholm, former governor of U.S. State of Michigan (2003–11), current US Secretary of Energy under President Biden (2021–present)
- Nancy Greene Raine, Olympic champion and Canadian senator
- Grimes, singer-songwriter, director, musician, actress
- Julia Grosso, soccer player for the Canada national team
- Aaron Guiel, Major League Baseball player
- Trevor Guthrie, singer

== H ==
- Meredith Hama-Brown, actress and filmmaker
- Rick Hansen, athlete, activist, philanthropist
- Rich Harden, Major League Baseball player
- Jansen Harkins, NHL player for the Pittsburgh Penguins
- Jillian Harris, ABC's 5th Bachelorette
- Laura Harris, actress
- Chris Haslam, professional skateboarder
- Joel Haywood, basketball player
- Meghan Heffern, actress
- Maryke Hendrikse, voice actress
- Gregory Henriquez, architect
- Doug Hepburn, strongman and weightlifter
- Fred Herzog, photographer
- Ed Hill, stand-up comedian
- Matt Hill, voice actor
- Brent Hodge, film director and CEO of Hodgee Films
- Bert Hoffmeister, commander of the 5th Canadian Division in the Second World War, then president of MacMillan Bloedel
- Jacob Hoggard, lead singer of the band Hedley
- Clive Holden, poet, film director and visual artist
- Antony Holland, actor
- Bob Houbregs, NBA player for the Milwaukee Hawks, Baltimore Bullets, Boston Celtics, and the Fort Wayne Pistons; general manager of the Seattle SuperSonics; member of the Naismith Memorial Basketball Hall of Fame
- Harrison Houde, composer, actor
- Barbara Howard, sprinter
- Jono Howard, Canadian-born writer who works primarily on animated children's shows
- Elva Hsiao, Mandopop singer
- Kaylin Hsieh, fencer

== I ==
- Frank Iacobucci, former Justice of the Supreme Court of Canada
- Daniel Ingram, musician
- John Ireland, actor
- Britt Irvin, actress, musician and voice-over artist
- Katharine Isabelle, actress
- Robert Ito, former actor

== J ==
- Manny Jacinto, actor, comedian
- Joshua Jackson, actor
- Colin James, musician
- Liam James, actor
- Michael Janyk, Canadian alpine skier
- Janyse Jaud, actress and singer
- Jazzy B, actor, singer
- Sarah Jeffery, actress, dancer, singer
- E. A. Jenns, poet
- Carly Rae Jepsen, singer
- Harry Jerome, athlete, educator
- Valerie Jerome, athlete, educator
- Avan Jogia, actor
- Bindy Johal, drug trafficker and gangster
- Ryan Johansen, ice hockey player
- Alexz Johnson, actress, singer
- Vera Johnson, singer
- Christopher Judge, actor

== K ==
- Evander Kane, National Hockey League player
- Paul Kariya, National Hockey League player
- Earl Keeley, football player
- Joe Keithley, punk musician
- Peter Kelamis, voice actor
- Larry Kent, filmmaker
- Alexander Kerfoot, National Hockey League player
- Cevin Key, musician
- Samuel Khouth, voice actor
- Margot Kidder, actress
- Stella Kim, vocalist of South Korean girl group Hearts2Hearts
- Allan King, film director
- Terry Klassen, voice actor and director
- Joy Kogawa, novelist, poet
- Kristin Kreuk, actress
- David Kundtz, self-help author and psychotherapist
- Sean Michael Kyer, actor

== L ==
- Tyler Labine, actor
- David Lam, politician
- Peter Lando, set decorator
- Evelyn Lau, poet and novelist
- Tony Labrusca, model, actor, singer
- Maggie Lawson, actress
- Mireille Lebel, opera singer/soloist
- Angela Lee, mixed martial artist
- Christian Lee, mixed martial artist
- Cory Lee, singer
- Jen Sookfong Lee, novelist, broadcaster
- Mark Lee, singer-songwriter and member of South Korean boy group NCT
- Sook-Yin Lee, media personality
- Bill Leeb, musician, singer
- Lily Alice Lefevre, poet
- Jade LeMac, singer-songwriter
- Bob Lenarduzzi, soccer player
- Darryl Lenox, comedian
- Sherwood Lett, soldier, lawyer, chancellor of UBC
- Andrea Libman, voice actress known for her lead role in My Little Pony: Friendship Is Magic
- Jeff L. Lieberman, film director, writer and producer
- Shin Lim, close-up magician
- Trevor Linden, NHL hockey player
- Bernice Liu, actress
- Mary Livingstone (formerly Sadie Marks), actress; wife of Jack Benny
- Quinn Lord, actor
- Rochelle Low, field hockey player
- Malcolm Lowry, writer
- Crystal Lowe, actress
- Jessica Lowndes, actress
- Jessica Lucas, actress
- Milan Lucic, NHL player
- Alexander Ludwig, actor

== M ==
- Elsie MacGill, first female aeronautical engineer
- Norma MacMillan, voice actress
- Trystan Magnuson, Major League Baseball player
- Mig Macario, actor
- Karen Diane Magnussen, figure skater
- Dan Mangan, musician
- Charles Marega, sculptor
- Rebecca Marino, professional tennis player
- Daphne Marlatt, poet, novelist
- Shaiju Mathew, author, filmmaker
- Scott Mathieson, Major League Baseball player
- Seok Matthew, singer and rapper of South Korean boy band Zerobaseone
- Terry McBride, CEO and founder, Nettwerk Music Group
- Shane McConkey, professional freestyle skier
- J. J. McCullough, YouTuber
- Dean McFadden, Commander of the Royal Canadian Navy
- Leah McHenry, musician and music educator
- Ashleigh McIvor, Olympic champion skier
- Cody McKay, Major League Baseball player
- Dave McKay, Major League Baseball player
- Britt McKillip, actress
- Carly McKillip, actress
- Sarah McLachlan, singer-songwriter
- Brandon Jay McLaren, actor
- Mercedes McNab, actress
- Chris McNally, Canadian actor
- Andrew McNee, Canadian actor
- Scott McNeil, voice actor
- John H. Meier, financier and former business adviser to Howard Hughes
- Charles Merritt, winner of the Victoria Cross
- Brent Miller, actor
- Wentworth Miller, actor
- Fraser Minten, NHL player
- Lois Mitchell, businesswoman
- Shay Mitchell, actress
- Zhang Mo, table tennis player
- Colin Mochrie, comedian
- Moka Only, rapper, musician, member of rap group Swollen Members
- Cory Monteith, actor
- Kevin Moon, vocalist with Korean group The Boyz
- Greg Moore, racing driver
- James Moore, politician and senior Federal cabinet minister
- Justin Morneau, Major League Baseball player
- Kirby Morrow (1973–2020), voice actor
- Carrie-Anne Moss, actress
- Tegan Moss, actress
- Douglas Albert Munro, only US Coast Guardsman to win the Medal of Honor
- Jane Munro, poet
- Michelle Mylett, actress

== N ==
- Ira B. Nadel, biographer and literary critic
- Nardwuar the Human Serviette, radio host and musician
- Steve Nash, NBA player
- Cam Neely, NHL player
- Kliph Nesteroff, writer, broadcaster
- W. H. New, English professor, literary critic, poet
- Alisha Newton, actress
- Mayko Nguyen, actress
- bpNichol, poet
- Kevin Nicholson, Major League Baseball player
- Mike Nickeas, Major League Baseball player
- Ryan Nugent-Hopkins, NHL player

== O ==
- Brenna O'Brien, actress
- Victor Odlum, journalist, soldier, and diplomat
- Nivek Ogre, singer, musician
- Pat Onstad, soccer player
- Bud Osborn, poet, community organizer, and activist

== P ==
- J. I. Packer, Anglican theologian
- Fred Page, Hockey Hall of Fame inductee
- Frank Palmer, businessman
- Grace Park, actress
- Jim Pattison, entrepreneur
- Kit Pearson, children's writer
- Missy Peregrym, actress
- Emily Perkins, actress
- Stan Persky, writer
- Laurence J. Peter, educator, formulator of the Peter principle
- El Phantasmo, professional wrestler
- Kimberly Phillips, educator and curator
- Maddie Phillips, actress
- Hazel Jane Plante, writer
- Susan Point, Musqueam Coast Salish artist
- Carly Pope, actress
- Helen Potrebenko, author
- Powfu, singer-songwriter
- Daniel Powter, singer
- Jaime Lo Presti, football
- Carey Price, NHL goaltender for the Montreal Canadiens
- Jason Priestley, actor, director, producer
- Kirsten Prout, actress

== Q ==
- Wanting Qu, singer-songwriter
- Juda Hirsch Quastel, biochemist, died in Vancouver

== R ==
- Josh Ramsay, lead singer of band Marianas Trench
- Rascalz, hip hop group
- Michael Rasmussen, NHL player for the Detroit Red Wings
- Bob Rennie, real estate marketer, art collector
- Eric Reprid, rapper
- Ryan Reynolds, actor
- Dal Richards, musician, big band leader
- Emily Bett Rickards, actress
- Morgan Rielly, NHL player
- Ryan Robbins, actor
- Rachel Roberts, actress, fashion model
- Claude C. Robinson, ice hockey executive and inductee into the Hockey Hall of Fame
- Spider Robinson, author
- Wayne Robson, actor
- Coco Rocha, fashion model
- James Roday, actor
- Evan Roderick, actor and former ice hockey player
- Seth Rogen, actor, writer, and comedian
- Teryl Rothery, television anchor, actress
- Melissa Roxburgh, actress

== S ==
- Mehdi Sadaghdar, YouTuber, comedian
- Joe Sakic, NHL player ("Burnaby Joe")
- Eliza Sam, Hong Kong actress
- Rhea Santos, newscaster, journalist
- Devon Sawa, actor
- Louise Schatz, Canadian-born Israeli artist and designer
- Conrad Schmidt, activist
- Sophie Schmidt, member of Canadian Women's National soccer team
- Drew Scott, television personality
- Jonathan Scott, television personality
- Chelan Simmons, actress, model
- Jasmine Sealy, writer
- Linus Sebastian, YouTuber, presenter, producer, writer
- Brandon Segal, NHL player
- Michael Shanks, actor
- Kathryn Shaw, artistic director
- Stephen Lea Sheppard, actor, writer
- Kelly Sheridan, voice actress
- Tei Shi, singer
- Hide Hyodo Shimizu, Japanese-Canadian educator and activist, member of the Order of Canada
- Rebecca Shoichet, voice actress
- Lydia Shum Din-ha, elder sister of Alfred Sung; Hong Kong actress
- Ken Sim, ABC Vancouver partylist leader
- Christine Sinclair, captain of Canadian Women's National soccer team
- Robert Sing, Canadian soccer player
- Nelson Skalbania, entrepreneur
- Stephen Smart, former journalist
- Bill Smith, soccer player
- Colleen Smith, All-American Girls Professional Baseball League player
- Gregory Smith, actor
- Trevor Smith, NHL player
- Cobie Smulders, actress
- Heather Spears, poet, artist, novelist
- Tabitha St. Germain, voice actress
- John G. Stackhouse Jr., writer and professor of religion
- Jewel Staite, actress
- Rita Steblin, musicologist
- Arran Stephens, entrepreneur, writer
- Kennedy Stewart, academic and former Mayor of Vancouver (2018–2022)
- Ryan Stiles, comedian, actor
- Dorothy Stratten, actress, model
- Katie Stuart, actress
- Sean Stubbs, musician
- Billy Suede, professional wrestler
- Adam Sussman, entrepreneur
- David Suzuki, environmentalist, scientist, broadcaster
- Brad Swaile, voice actor
- Bruce Sweeney, film director
- R. J. Swindle, Major League Baseball player

== T ==
- Jenna Talackova, model, television personality
- Amanda Tapping, actress
- Ari Taub (born 1971), Olympic Greco-Roman wrestler
- Bobby Taylor, soul singer
- Timothy Taylor, writer
- Madeleine Thien, writer
- Reece Thompson, actor
- Brent Titcomb, actor, singer, member of the Canadian band 3's a Crowd
- Alex To, Mandopop singer
- Lee Tockar, voice actor
- Eckhart Tolle, spiritual teacher
- Vincent Tong, voice actor
- Devin Townsend, singer, musician
- Kat Tolentino, volleyball player
- Jacob Tremblay, child actor
- Jessica Trisko, Miss Earth 2007
- Margaret Trudeau (now Margaret Trudeau Kemper), author; former wife of Prime Minister Pierre Trudeau and mother of Justin Trudeau
- Nicholas Tse, Cantopop singer
- John Turner, former Prime Minister
- Michael Turner, writer, musician

== U ==
- Hamilton Upton (1912–1965), Canadian flying ace serving in the RAF during WW2

== V ==
- Emmanuelle Vaugier, actress
- Graham Verchere, actor
- Trevor Veitch, musician, record producer

== W ==
- Larry Walker, Major League Baseball player
- Jeff Wall, artist
- Ian Wallace, artist
- Nolan Watson, entrepreneur and philanthropist
- Daniel Wesley, musician
- Andrew Wilkinson, physician, lawyer and politician
- Charles Wilkinson, filmmaker and author
- Lorelei Williams, Indigenous activist
- Martyn S. Williams, mountain and wilderness guide; first person to lead expeditions to the three extremes, South Pole (1989) North Pole (1992) and Everest (1991)
- Chip Wilson, businessman and founder of Lululemon Athletica
- S. I. Hayakawa, politician
- Finn Wolfhard, actor
- Brian Wong, founder of Kiip
- Byron Wong, musician
- Jason Wu, Taiwanese-Canadian artist and fashion designer

== Y ==
- Jeanny Yao, biochemist, technology entrepreneur and environmentalist
- Benny Yau, television presenter, singer
- Brandon Yip, ice hockey player
- Françoise Yip, actress
- Kelly Yu, singer

== Z ==
- Alex Zahara, actor
- Chiara Zanni, actress
