= List of people from the Gaspé Peninsula =

This is a list of people from the Gaspé Peninsula region of Quebec.

- François Babin – Star Académie participant
- Charles Belleau – law professor
- Martin Bérubé – actor, Bouscotte, SRC
- La Bolduc – folk singer
- Isabelle Boulay – singer
- Manuel Brault – singer
- Geneviève Bujold – actor
- Véronique Claveau – actress and comedian
- Alain Côté – ice hockey player
- Thérèse Tanguay Dion – television personality; mother of Céline Dion
- Edmund James Flynn – tenth Premier of Quebec
- Mathieu Garon – ice hockey player, Tampa Bay Lightning
- Sébastien Harrison – writer and scenarist
- Laurence Jalbert – singer-songwriter
- Pierre Labrie – poet
- Pat The White (Patrick Le Blanc) – guitarist and singer
- Bertrand B. Leblanc – writer
- Paul LeDuc – wrestler
- Alan LeGros – actor
- Gérard D. Levesque – politician
- Jean-Louis Lévesque – entrepreneur, philanthropist
- René Lévesque – Premier of Quebec, leader of the first sovereignty referendum
- Hazel McCallion – Mayor of Mississauga, Ontario
- Josélito Michaud – animator
- Esdras Minville – economist, sociologist, and university administrator
- Nelson Minville – singer
- Cédric Paquette – ice hockey player
- Kevin Parent – singer-songwriter
- François-Xavier Ross – first bishop of Diocese of Gaspé
- Dave Roussy – Star Académie participant
- Kathleen Sergerie – singer

== See also ==
- Lists of people from Quebec by region
- List of Quebecers
- List of Quebec regions
