= Pierre Labrie =

Québécois poet

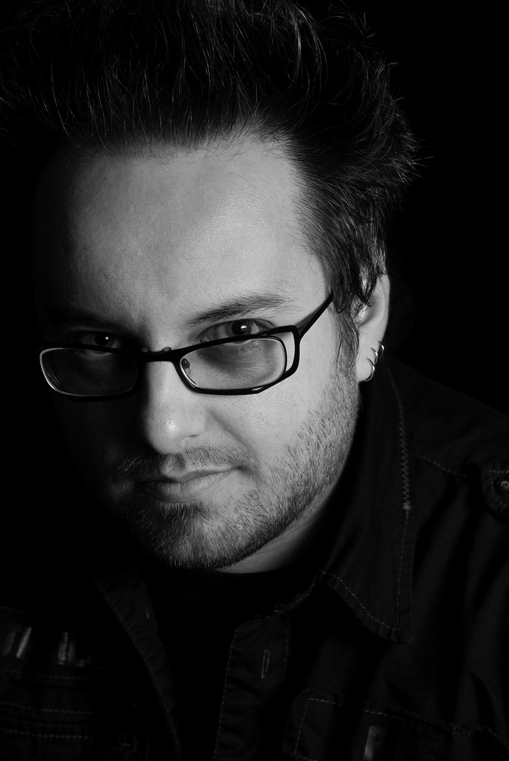
2008 official photo by Pierre Labrie.

Pierre Labrie (born 23 April 1972) is a Québécois poet, born at Mont-Joli, Quebec. He now lives in Trois-Rivières.

Very involved in the social and cultural milieu of the region, he was president of the Société des Écrivains de la Mauricie, co-founder and editor of les Éditions Cobalt, and co-founder of the magazine Les Soirs Rouges, which he ran until 2003. He has published several titles, including À tout hasard (Le Sabord, 2000), L’amour usinaire (Écrits des forges, 2002, shortlisted for the Gérald Godin Prize and the Félix Leclerc Prize in 2003), Voyage dans chacune des Cellules (Trois-Pistoles, 2003, shortlisted for the Gérald Godin Prize in 2004), à minuit. changez la date (Écrits des Forges, 2004), La pléiade des nombres épidémiques (Trois-Pistoles, 2005) and Le mobile du temps (Trois-Pistoles, 2006).

In 2005, Pierre Labrie was awarded the Gérald Godin Prize for à minuit. changez la date.

== Poetry ==
- À tout hasard (recueil de poèmes, manifeste), avec Carl Lacharité, Trois-Rivières, Éditions d'art Le Sabord, 2000.
- Cage verte, Trois-Rivières, Éditions Cobalt, 2001.
- L’amour usinaire, Trois-Rivières, Écrits des Forges, 2002.
- Voyage dans chacune des Cellules, Trois-Pistoles, Éditions Trois-Pistoles, 2003.
- à minuit. changez la date, Trois-Rivières, Écrits des Forges, 2004.
- La pléiade des nombres épidémiques, Trois-Pistoles, Éditions Trois-Pistoles, 2005.
- Le mobile du temps, Trois-Pistoles, Éditions Trois-Pistoles, 2006.
- Ajouts actuels aux révélations, Trois-Pistoles, Éditions Trois-Pistoles, 2010.

== Theatre ==
- 5250, St-Valère - Territoire désarticulé. Setting in scene of Reynald Viel, with Stéphanie Champagne and Nathan Champagne, Les Productions des Mots... Céans, Studio théâtre, Trois-Rivières, of January 19 at February 24, 2007.

== Honors ==
- 2005 - Prix de littérature Gérald-Godin, à minuit. changez la date
- 2004 - Shortlisted for Prix de littérature Gérald-Godin, Voyage dans chacune des Cellules
- 2003 - Shortlisted for Prix Félix-Leclerc de la poésie, L’amour usinaire
- 2003 - Shortlisted for Prix de littérature Gérald-Godin, L’amour usinaire

== See also ==
- List of people from Mauricie
- List of people from the Gaspé Peninsula
- List of poets
