= Verchères =

- Municipality
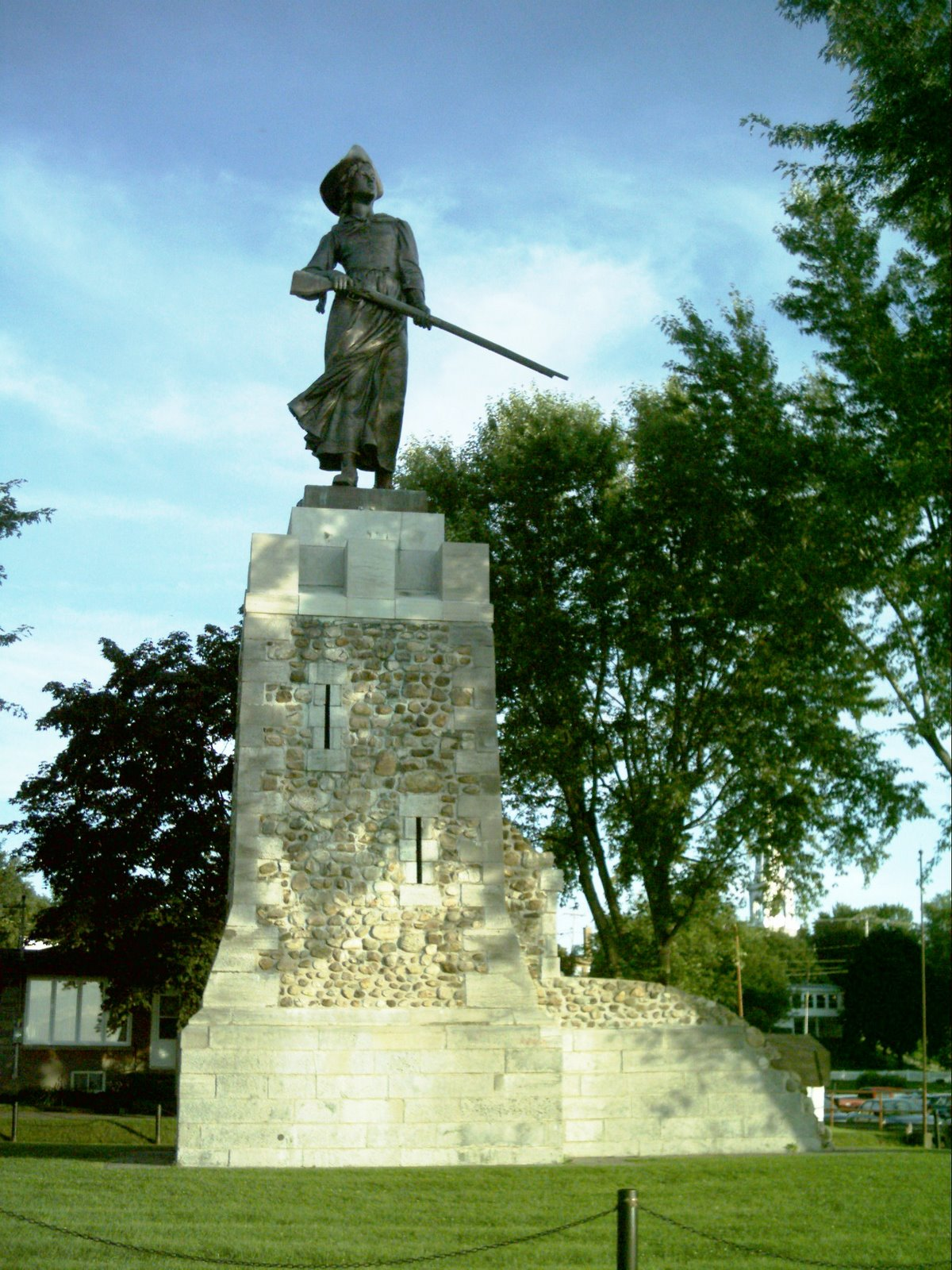
- Statue honouring heroine Madeleine de Verchères.

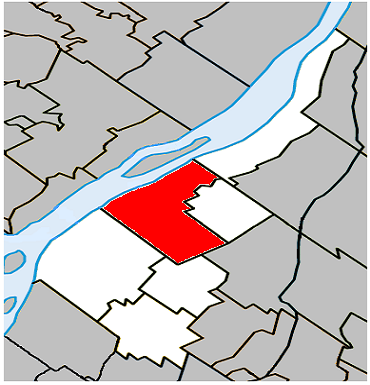
- Location within Marguerite-D'Youville RCM.

- Location in southern Quebec. Verchères (Quebec) Verchères (Canada)
- Coordinates: 45°47′N 73°21′W
- Country: Canada
- Province: Quebec
- Region: Montérégie
- RCM: Marguerite-D'Youville
- Constituted: September 18, 1971

Government
  - Mayor: Katherine R. L'Heureux
  - Federal riding: Pierre-Boucher—Les Patriotes—Verchères
  - Prov. riding: Verchères

Area
  - Municipality: 85.20 km^{2} (32.90 sq mi)
  - Land: 72.63 km^{2} (28.04 sq mi)
  - Urban: 2.99 km^{2} (1.15 sq mi)

Population (2021)
  - Municipality: 5,759
  - Density: 79.3/km^{2} (205/sq mi)
  - Urban: 4,359
  - Urban density: 1,457.8/km^{2} (3,776/sq mi)
  - Pop 2016-2021: ▼1.3%
  - Dwellings: 2,453
- Time zone: UTC−5 (EST)
  - Summer (DST): UTC−4 (EDT)
- Postal code(s): J0L 2R0
- Area codes: 450 and 579
- Highways A-30: R-132
- Website: www.ville.vercheres.qc.ca

Verchères (French pronunciation: [vɛʁʃɛʁ]) is an off-island suburb of Montreal, in Montérégie, Quebec, located on the south bank of the Saint Lawrence River. The population as of the Canada 2021 Census was 5,759.

== History ==
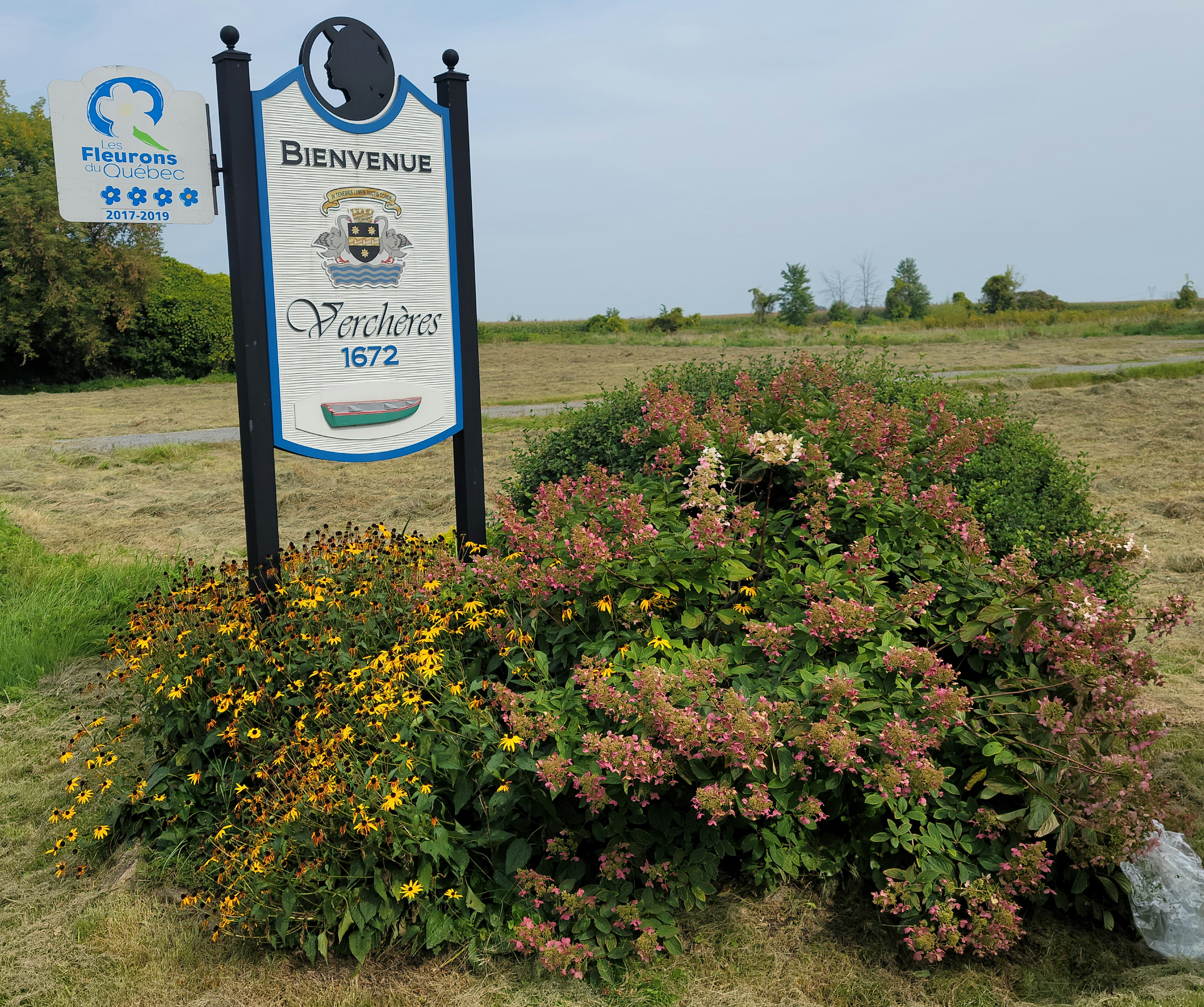
Welcome sign at the south entrance, along the Marie-Victorin road

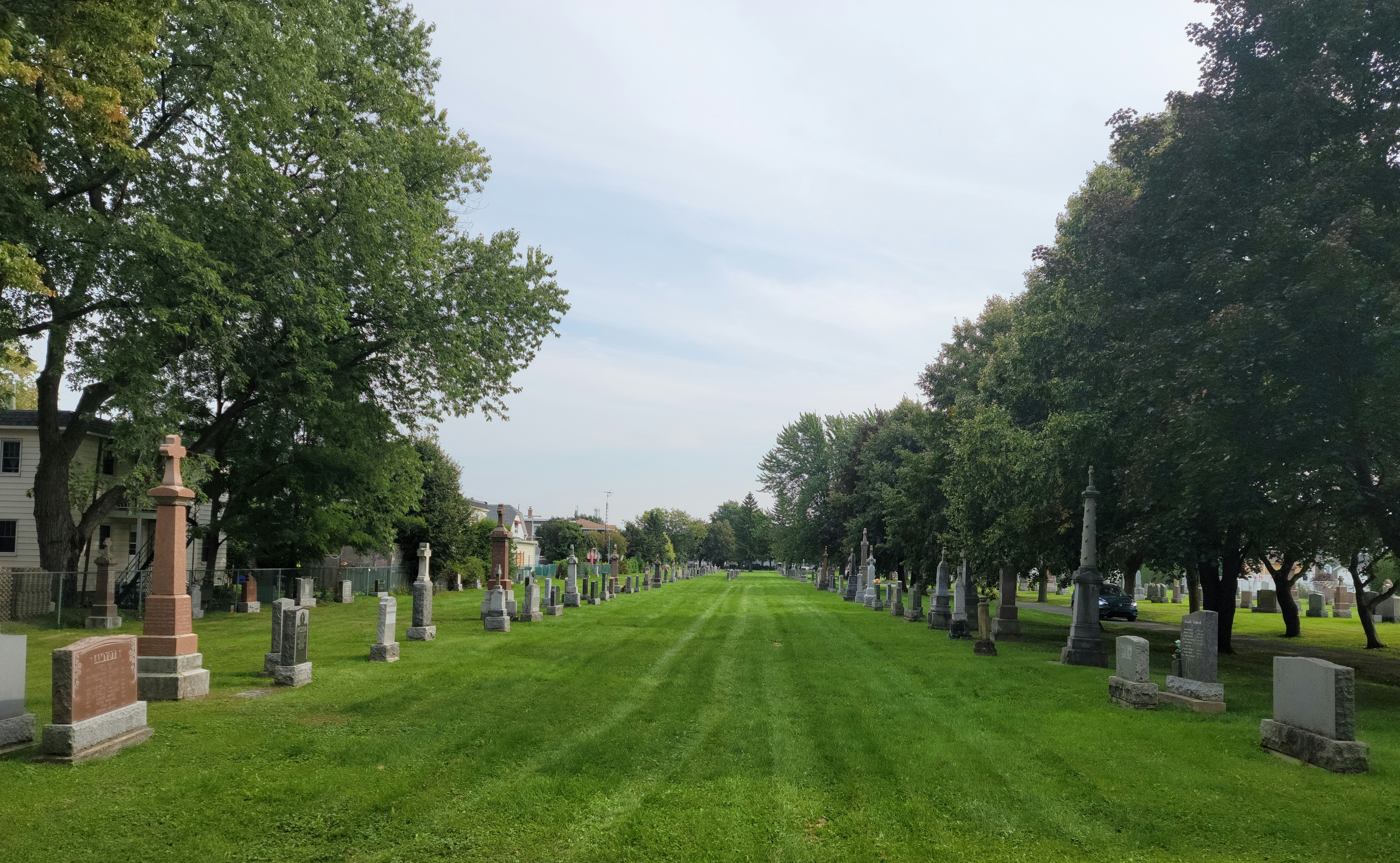
Overview of the village cemetery

Heritage house along the Marie-Victorin road (route 132)

In the 17th century, the settlement at Verchères was the scene of an Iroquois raid that was apparently thwarted by the ingenuity of a 14-year-old girl named Madeleine (now known as Madeleine de Verchères). A cast-iron statue of Madeleine de Verchères stands today by the former location of the settlement stronghold on the shore of the Saint-Lawrence river.

In French, the word Verchères can be used as an adjective to describe a specific type of rowboat invented in Verchères at the end of the 19th century, i.e. chaloupe verchères. A specimen of the rowboat is on permanent outdoor display during the summer and fall at the Parc Jean-Marie Moreau across from the town office.

The motto of Verchères is In Tenebris Lumen Rectis Corde. The streets of Verchères are mostly named after the patronyms of residing families but also after local people who rose to celebrity in Canadian history.

== Geography ==
Verchères is located about 40 km (25 mi) east of Montreal. The municipality is traversed by Road 132, an important road that runs along the St. Lawrence River and connects several municipalities along the south shore. The river plays a significant role in the economy of Verchères, offering picturesque views and opportunities for recreational activities.

The terrain is relatively flat, typical of the Great Lakes–St. Lawrence Lowlands, with some gentle elevations and wooded areas. The landscape of Verchères is typically rural, with farmland, natural areas and residential zones.

== Demographics ==
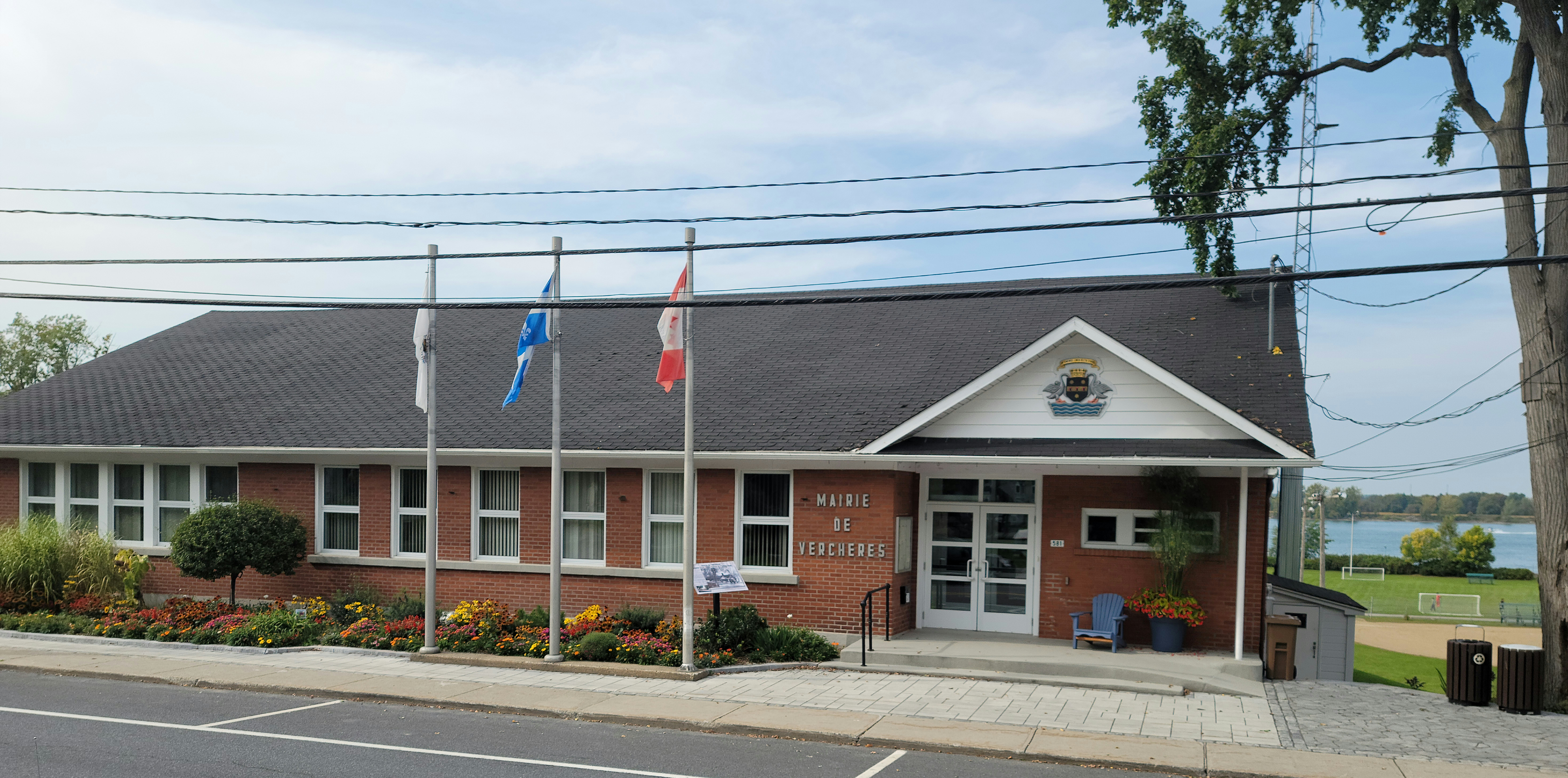
City Hall of Verchères

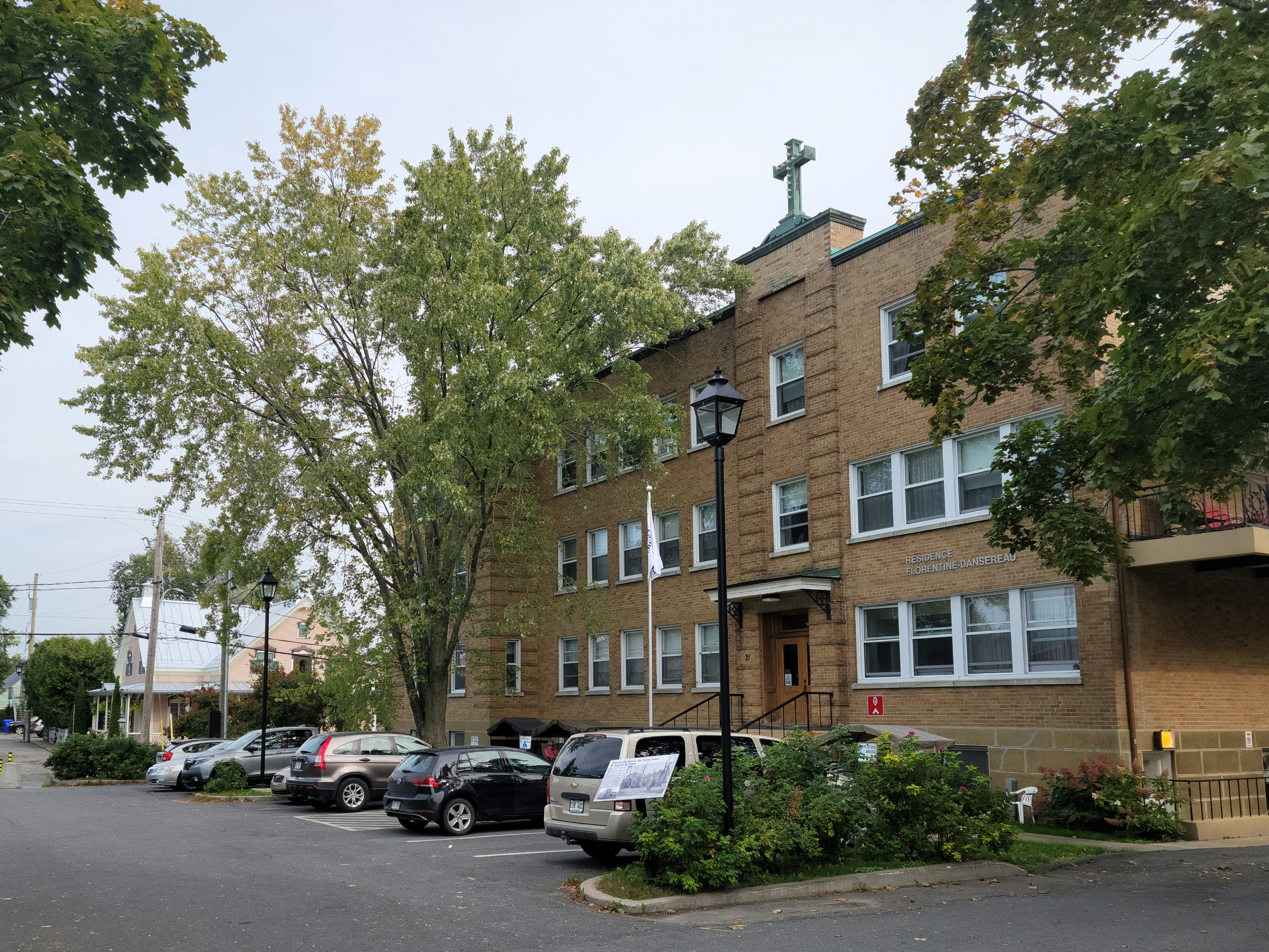
Florentine-Dansereau residence

=== Population ===
In the 2021 Census of Population conducted by Statistics Canada, Verchères had a population of 5,759 living in 2,394 of its 2,453 total private dwellings, a change of −1.3% from its 2016 population of 5,835. With a land area of 72.63 km^{2} (28.04 sq mi), it had a population density of 79.3/km^{2} (205.4/sq mi) in 2021.

In 2021, the median age of Verchères was 42.8 and 81% of the population were 15 years of age and over.

Canada census – Verchères community profile

| | 2021 | 2016 | 2011 |
| Population | 5,759 (-1.3% from 2016) | 5,835 (+2.5% from 2011) | 5,692 (+8.6% from 2006) |
| Land area | 72.63 km^{2} (28.04 sq mi) | 72.57 km^{2} (28.02 sq mi) | 73.27 km^{2} (28.29 sq mi) |
| Population density | 79.3/km^{2} (205/sq mi) | 80.4/km^{2} (208/sq mi) | 77.7/km^{2} (201/sq mi) |
| Median age | 41.8 (M: 42.4, F: 43.2) | 40.8 (M: 40.8, F: 40.9) | 40.7 (M: 40.1, F: 41.3) |
| Private dwellings | 2,453 (total) | 2,440 (total) | 2,406 (total) |
| Median household income | $90,000 | $75,955 | $68,946 |

References: 2021 2016 2011

Historical Census Data - Verchères, Quebec

| Year | Pop. | ±% |
|---|---|---|
| 1976 | 3,586 | — |
| 1981 | 4,473 | +24.7% |
| 1986 | 4,530 | +1.3% |
| 1991 | 4,781 | +5.5% |

| Year | Pop. | ±% |
|---|---|---|
| 1996 | 4,854 | +1.5% |
| 2001 | 4,782 | −1.5% |
| 2006 | 5,243 | +9.6% |
| 2011 | 5,692 | +8.6% |

| Year | Pop. | ±% |
|---|---|---|
| 2016 | 5,835 | +2.5% |
| 2021 | 5,759 | −1.3% |

=== Language ===
Residents whose sole native language was French numbered 5,550 (96%), while those with only English as their first language were 60 (1%), 75 people (1%) had another language as their mother tongue and 50 people (0.9%) counted both French and English as their first language.

Canada Census Mother Tongue - Verchères, Quebec
| Census | Total | French | | | English | | | French & English | | | Other | | |
| Year | Responses | Count | Trend | Pop % | Count | Trend | Pop % | Count | Trend | Pop % | Count | Trend | Pop % |
| 2021 | 5,760 | 5,550 | ▼0.7% | 96.4% | 60 | ▼7.7% | 1.0% | 50 | ▲100.0% | 0.9% | 75 | 0.0% | 1.3% |
| 2016 | 5,770 | 5,590 | ▲0.8% | 96.9% | 65 | ▲8.3% | 1.1% | 25 | 0.0% | 0.4% | 75 | ▲66.7% | 1.3% |
| 2011 | 5,675 | 5,545 | ▲10.1% | 97.7% | 60 | ▲50.0% | 1.1% | 25 | ▲25.0% | 0.4% | 45 | ▼50.0% | 0.8% |
| 2006 | 5,185 | 5,035 | ▲8.3% | 97.1% | 40 | ▲33.3% | 0.8% | 20 | ▲100.0% | 0.4% | 90 | ▲125.0% | 1.7% |
| 2001 | 4,730 | 4,650 | ▼2.3% | 98.3% | 30 | ▼25.0% | 0.6% | 10 | ▲ n/a% | 0.2% | 40 | ▲60.0% | 0.9% |
| 1996 | 4,825 | 4,760 | n/a | 98.7% | 40 | n/a | 0.8% | 0 | n/a | 0.0% | 25 | n/a | 0.5% |

== Government ==
=== Municipal ===
Municipal elections are held en bloc, according to a six-district system.

== Notable people ==
- Jean Blouf, pioneer of Verchères
- Joseph Coulon de Jumonville whose death while a prisoner of George Washington ignited the French and Indian War theater of the Seven Years' War
- Louis Coulon de Villiers who is the only officer to whom Washington ever surrendered.
- François Coulon de Villiers another of the Coulon brothers who would later be Alcalde of New Orleans, Louisiana (New Spain)
- Bernard Landry former Premier of Quebec .
- Lynda Lemay, songwriter and singer.
- Calixa Lavallée, composer of O Canada.
- Pierre Bouchard, Montreal Canadiens retired former professional hockey player.
- Alexandre Beaudoin, fingerprint scientist
- Joseph Bailly, fur trader and first permanent Euro-American settler in northwest Indiana. His homestead is a part of Indiana Dunes National Park.

== Panorama ==
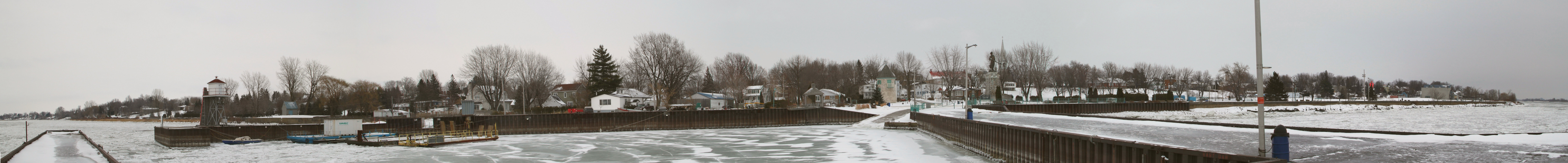
View of Verchères from the Saint Lawrence River in winter
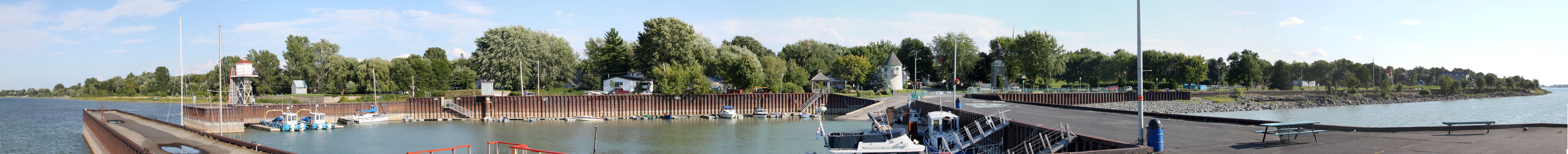
View of Verchères from the Saint Lawrence River in summer

== See also ==
- List of municipalities in Quebec
