= Félix-Odilon Gauthier =

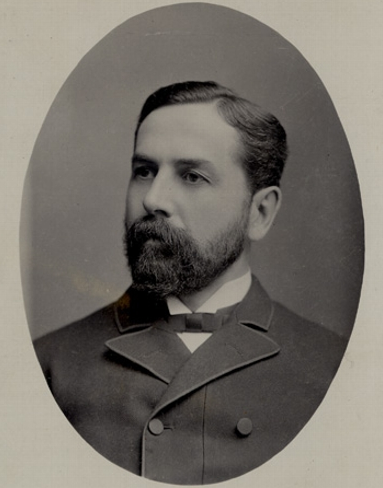
- Born: August 18, 1808; Quebec City, Lower Canada
- Died: April 29, 1876 (aged 67); Montmagny, Quebec
- Occupation(s): Lawyer and judge

Félix-Odilon Gauthier (August 18, 1808 – April 29, 1876) was a Canadian lawyer and judge. Born in Quebec City, Lower Canada to Augustin Gauthier, treasurer of Quebec City from 1851 to 1868 and Marie Trudelle, Gauthier studied at the Petit Séminaire of Quebec and was called to the bar in 1823. He practiced law in Quebec City. In 1847 he became the captain of the 3rd Battalion of the Quebec militia. In 1860 he was made a judge of the Superior Court, and retired in 1870.
