= Ruth M. Gardiner =

U.S. Army nurse killed in action

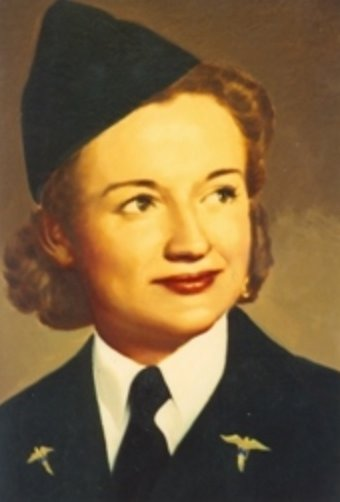
- Gardiner, c. 1943
- Born: May 20, 1914; Calgary, Alberta, Canada
- Died: July 27, 1943 (aged 29); Naknek, Alaska, United States
- Other names: Ruth Gardiner
- Occupation: Nurse

Ruth M. Gardiner (May 20, 1914 – July 27, 1943) was a nurse in the United States Army Nurse Corps. She served in the Alaskan Theater and rose to the rank of Second Lieutenant. Gardiner was the first Army Nurse Corps' flight nurse killed while serving in World War II. She was one of a group of six nurses in Alaska that assisted in medical evacuations by plane. Gardiner was killed while on one such evacuation, when the aircraft on which she was traveling crashed.

The Ruth M. Gardiner General Hospital in Chicago was named in her honor; it was the first Army hospital named for a woman or nurse.

== Career ==
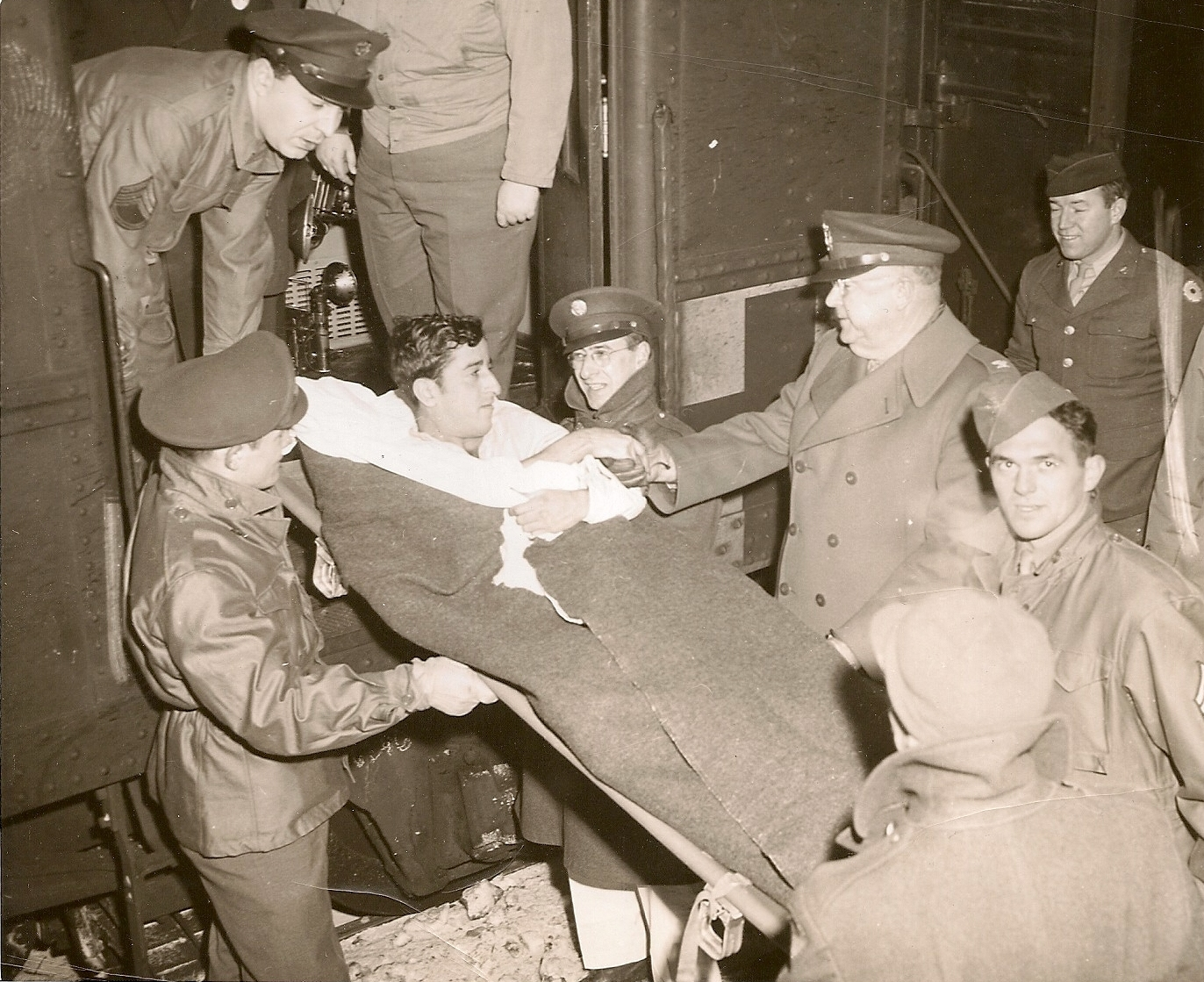
Delivering wounded soldiers by train to Gardiner General Hospital in 1945

Gardiner trained in nursing at the White Haven, Pennsylvania, sanatorium and graduated from there in 1934.

Gardiner was assigned to the 349th Air Evacuation Group at Bowman Field, Kentucky. She became a Second Lieutenant and served in Alaska with Flight A of the 805th Medical Air Evacuation Transport Squadron. Gardiner was killed when the aircraft crashed near Naknek, Alaska, while on a medical evacuation mission on July 27, 1943. Gardiner was part of a group of nurses that "covered 3,500,000 air miles, evacuating over 2,500 cases, all without injury or loss of a single patient", according to the U. S. Army Medical Department.

== Hospital ==
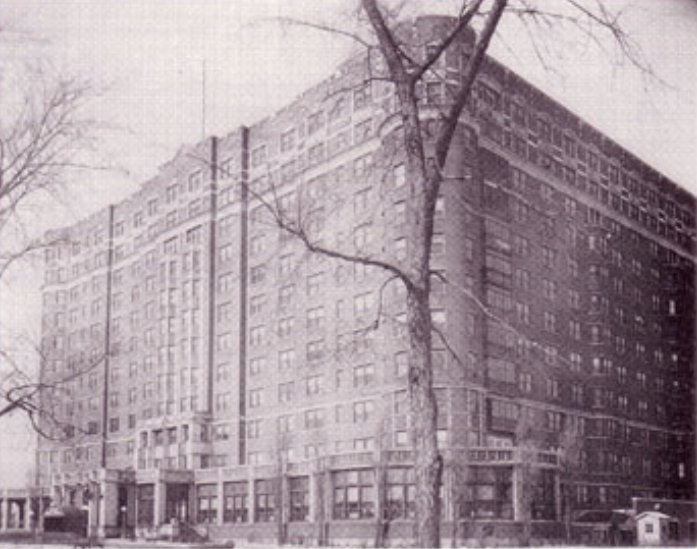
Gardiner General Hospital, c. 1944–1945

The Army General Hospital, a former Chicago hotel, was named in honor of Gardiner who was the first Army Nurse Corps' flight nurse killed while serving in World War II. It was the first Army hospital named for a woman or nurse. Gardiner was killed in July 1943 and the hospital was dedicated in July 1944. The Army General Hospital of Chicago became known as the Ruth M. Gardiner General Hospital.

== Sources ==
- Sarnecky, Mary T. (4 October 1999). A History of the U.S. Army Nurse Corps. University of Pennsylvania Press. p. 262. ISBN 978-0-81-2235-02-9.
