= List of Irish Quebecers =

This is a list of people in the Canadian province of Quebec of Irish ancestry.

- Charles McKiernan (1835–1889) - Montreal tavern owner, innkeeper and philanthropist; known as Joe Beef
- Patrice Bergeron - professional ice hockey centre
- Geneviève Bujold - actor
- Robert Burns - politician
- Lawrence Cannon - former Minister of Transport, Infrastructure and Communities
- Jean Charest - former Premier of Quebec
- Jim Corcoran - singer-songwriter
- Peter Cullen - voice actor
- Charles Doherty - Federal Minister in the Borden government
- Georges Dor - singer-songwriter, author, poet
- Jennifer Finnigan - actress
- Charles Fitzpatrick - Chief Justice, Supreme Court of Canada
- Edmund James Flynn - former Premier of Quebec
- Sir William Hales Hingston - 16th Mayor of Montreal; Conservative Senator
- Daniel Johnson, Sr. - former Premier of Quebec
- Daniel Johnson, Jr. - former Premier of Quebec
- Pierre-Marc Johnson - former Premier of Quebec
- Jean-Baptiste Kelly - Roman Catholic Vicar-general
- Larkin Kerwin - first President of the Canadian Space Agency
- Eric Kierans - politician
- Donovan King - theatre activist, creator of infringement Festival
- La Bolduc, née Mary Rose-Anna Travers - musician
- Bernard Lonergan - philosopher, theologian
- John Lynch-Staunton - politician
- Paul Martin, Jr. - 21st Prime Minister of Canada
- Kate and Anna McGarrigle - Québécois folklore musicians
- Thomas D'Arcy McGee - father of Canadian Confederation
- John McLoughlin - doctor and Factor with Hudson's Bay Company, "father of Oregon"
- James McShane - 21st Mayor of Montreal, Member of Parliament, Member of Provincial Parliament
- Thomas Mulcair - Member of Parliament; Leader of the Opposition; former Member of the National Assembly
- Brian Mulroney - 18th Prime Minister of Canada
- Bryan Murray - (Terry's brother) former National Hockey League coach and general manager
- Terry Murray - (Bryan's brother) former National Hockey League player and coach
- Émile Nelligan - known as the national poet of Quebec
- Robert Nelson - doctor and Lower Canada Rebellion leader
- Wolfred Nelson - doctor and supporter of the Lower Canada Rebellion
- Edmund Bailey O'Callaghan - doctor and supporter of the Lower Canada Rebellion
- Michael Grattan O'Leary - politician
- Patrick Roy - former professional ice hockey goalie
- Claude Ryan - journalist and leader of the Opposition
- Frank Ryan - gangster
- Yves Ryan - Mayor of Montréal-Nord
- Louis St. Laurent - 12th Prime Minister of Canada
- Robert Scully - journalist and commentator; former host of Venture on CBC Television and Scully Rencontre on SRC Télévision
- Kevin Tierney - film producer
- Daniel Tracey - doctor, newspaper editor, Parti Patriote supporter
- William Workman - former Mayor of Montreal

== See also ==
- List of Quebecers
- Irish influence on Quebec culture
- Irish roots of Québécois reel music
- Irish Quebecers
- Irish diaspora
- Irish Canadians
- Irish Americans
- Culture of Ireland
- Culture of Quebec
