= Léon Gingras =

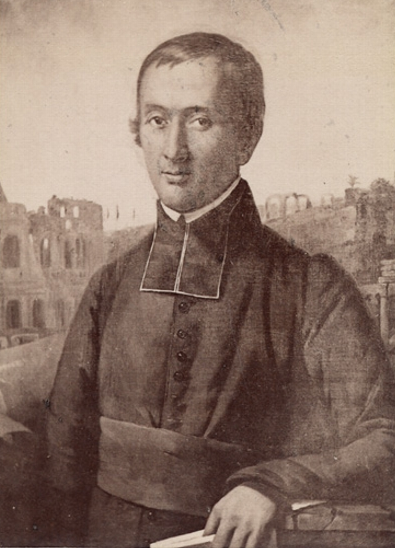
- Born: 5 August 1808; Quebec City, Lower Canada
- Died: 18 February 1860 (aged 51); Paris, France

Léon Gingras (5 August 1808 – 18 February 1860) was a Canadian Roman Catholic priest, educator, seminary administrator and author.

Born in Quebec City, Lower Canada, Gingras studied at the Petit Séminaire de Québec from 1820 to 1828 and at the Grand Séminaire de Québec from 1828 to 1831. He was ordained priest in 1831. He was a professor of theology and principal of the Grand Séminaire until 1840 and again from 1840 to 1842. From 1840 to 1842, he was principal of the Petit Séminaire and prefect of studies.

From 1844 to 1845, he toured Europe. Returning to Quebec, he was principal of the Grand Séminaire from 1845 to 1849. In 1847, he published a book, L’Orient ou voyage en Égypte, en Arabie, en Terre-Sainte, en Turquie et en Grèce, about his trip. In 1850, he was appointed to the council of the bishop of Quebec.
