= Robert Sing =

Canadian soccer player

Personal information
- Full name: Robert Sing
- Date of birth: April 11, 1986 (age 40)
- Place of birth: Vancouver, British Columbia, Canada
- Height: 1.86 m (6 ft 1 in)
- Position: Midfielder

Youth career
- Corinthians
- União São João
- Coquitlam Metro-Ford SC

Senior career*
Years	Team	Apps	(Gls)
2004–2005	Sapperton Rovers FC		
2006–2007	Yverdon-Sport	20	(0)
2007–2008	Sapperton Rovers FC		
2009–2010	GKP Gorzów Wielkopolski	12	(1)
2010	Sapperton Rovers FC		
2011	Wisła Płock	6	(0)
- * Club domestic league appearances and goals

Robert Sing (born April 11, 1986) is a Canadian former professional soccer player who played as a midfielder.

== Career ==
=== Club ===
He was released from Wisła Płock on 15 August 2011.
