= Bill Smith (soccer) =

Canadian soccer player

Personal information
- Full name: William Smith
- Place of birth: Vancouver, British Columbia, Canada
- Height: 1.73 m (5 ft 8 in)
- Positions: Right half; outside right

Senior career*
Years	Team	Apps	(Gls)
1943–1944	North Shore FC		
1943–1945	Vancouver Boeing FC		
1945–1953	North Shore FC / Carling's FC		
1953–1956	Seattle		
1956–1962	North Shore FC / Airco / Carling's FC		
1962–1963	Vancouver City / Canadians		
- * Club domestic league appearances and goals

Bill Smith is a former Canadian soccer player. He was a Canadian champion with North Shore FC in 1949.

In the Pacific Coast League, Smith won four championships with three teams: once with Vancouver Boeing FC (1943–44), twice with North Shore FC (1948–49 and 1950–51), and once with Vancouver Canadians (1962–63). He was a British Columbia All-Star in four seasons from 1946 to 1961.
