= Taylor McNallie =

Canadian anti-racism activist (born 1990)

- Born: October 28, 1990 (age 35); Saskatoon, Canada
- Organizations: Inclusive Canada; Black Lives Matter Canada; Walls Down Collective
- Known for: Anti-racism activism
- Website: taylormcnallie.ca

Taylor McNallie (October 28, 1990) is a Canadian activist who co-founded Inclusive Canada. She is also the Organizer for Black Lives Matter Canada, a member of the Walls Down Collective, and an advocate for mutual aid.

She co-founded Inclusive Canada in 2020 after the murder of George Floyd and has been known as an activist for Black rights and a critic of Calgary Police Service. In 2023, she was convicted of assaulting an off-duty police officer.

== Personal life ==
McNallie was born 1990 or 1991 in Saskatoon to a white mother and moved to Cremona, Alberta as a young child. A few years later they both moved to Didsbury. As an eleven year old child, McNallie was racially abused by an older boy, for being Black. At the age of sixteen years, she moved in with friend in Calgary.

As of 2022, McNallie lived in Calgary with her boyfriend and her ten-year-old daughter.

== Political activism ==
McNallie is the owner of Taylor Made Studios and the producer of Taylor Made Radio Entertainment Network. After the 2020 murder of George Floyd, McNallie co-founded Inclusive Canada, an anti-racist group that aims to encourage conversation and provide education about racism in Canada. The group was initially called Rural Alberta Against Racism. Taylor is known for her critique of Calgary Police and her activism work has made her, and her family, the target of racist abuse.

=== Views on Police ===
On October 26 2021, in a video released by CityNews, McNallie expressed their thoughts on addressing systemic violence in government and police services, saying: “There are so many others who have charges, or complaints against them right now… unless we go to the root of the problem, these things are going to continue to happen over and over.”

On November 24th 2022, McNallie made it clear that she supported abolishing the police, stating on The Don't Fret Podcast, "I'm full abolition at this point". On December 13th 2022, McNallie made a post on her public Instagram account with the slogan ACAB (All Cops Are Bastards).

== Legal issues ==
In 2020, she was charged with assault with a weapon by Red Deer Royal Canadian Mounted Police following events at Black Lives Matter event in Red Deer. McNallie described the charge as "as joke" and indicated she would defend the charge in a court of law. The charge was withdrawn in January 2022.

On June 15th, 2023, McNallie was found guilty of assault with a weapon, after she struck an off-duty police officer with a megaphone in August 2021 during a protest outside the Calgary Courts. The following day she was charged with two counts of assault, one count of sexual assault, and one count of unlawful confinement after a clash with anti-trans protestors outside of Western Canada High School in Calgary. Hate motivation was added to the charges after the Calgary Police Hate Crime Prevention Team completed their investigation.
