= Colette Samson =

Canadian activist (1923–1991)

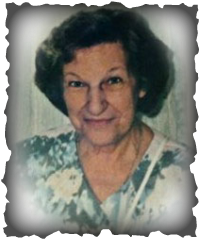
Colette Samson

Colette L. Samson (born June 28, 1923 – 1991) was the founder of La Maison Revivre, a refuge for the homeless, in Quebec City.

She was born in Lévis, Quebec and studied at the Couvent Marguerite d'Youville there. She joined the Jeunesse Étudiante Chrétienne movement and became local president. Samson was also a member of the Choeur d'Aubigny and was involved in theatre.

She founded the Maison Revivre in 1978.

In 1980, she was named Personality of the Year by the Régionale des Jeunes Chambres de Commerce de Québec. In 1986, she received the Prix Bénévolat-Canada awarded by the Canadian government. Samson was named a Chevalière in the National Order of Quebec in 1987.

Rue Colette-Samson in Quebec City was named in her honour.
