= Gabrielle Laïla Tittley =

Canadian artist (born 1988)

- Born: February 22, 1988 (age 38); Quebec City, Canada
- Known for: Multimedia artist

Gabrielle Laïla Tittley (born February 22, 1988) is a self-taught Canadian multidisciplinary artist who goes by the name Pony, which stands for "Poor One Newly Young".

== Life ==
Gabrielle Laïla Tittley was born to a Palestinian mother and a Franco-Ontarian father on February 22, 1988, in Quebec City, Quebec. She grew up in Outaouais and Newfoundland before moving to Montreal at the age of 17.

== Career ==
=== Events and installations ===
==== L'Amour Passe à Travers le Linge ====
Tittley created L'Amour Passe à Travers le Linge (LAPATLL), a charity event that took place yearly from 2013 to 2015. In partnership with other visual artists, the objective was to raise money for different non-profit organizations by selling limited-edition shirts.

==== No Role Models ====
Tittley's 2017 immersive installation, No Role Models, was initially inspired by rapper J. Cole. Joe Rocca, a member of local group Dead Obies, was in charge of the music for this 3-dimension exhibition at the PHI Centre in Montreal's Old Port. The event took place from March 4 to March 9, 2017, during that year's edition of the Nuit Blanche festival.

==== Fun House ====
In 2018, Tittley collaborated with Aldo during the yearly edition of Mural Festival. The artist participated in the Fun House project, which consisted of a two-level art installation on Saint-Laurent Boulevard. Pony's partnership with the shoe retailer also entailed the creation of a special edition of Pony x Aldo Mx3 sneakers, released on August 23, 2018.

==== Pop-ups and stores ====
Tittley has a company named Pony which sells clothing, pins, stickers, and prints. In January 2019, Tittley's art and merchandise were exposed for an event and pop-up shop at Zeppelin Station in Denver, Colorado. After multiple ephemeral pop-up shops, the artist's first permanent store, Emotions Infinies par Pony, opened in October 2020 on Plaza Saint-Hubert in Montreal.

==== Au Bout du Feel ====
A few months later, Pony participated in a fashion show for the 2019 edition of the Festival Mode & Design. Her segment, titled Au Bout du Feel, was presented on August 21.

=== Series ===
==== Still Optimiste ====
With Sid Lee's assistance, Pony created the digital illustrations Still Optimiste, published on Behance on July 13, 2016. The series was produced with a combination of photography and digital imaging techniques.

==== Hoaka swimwear ====
In 2018, Tittley collaborated with Quebecois business woman Elisabeth Rioux, owner and founder of Hoaka Swimwear. Together, they launched a collection of swimsuits influenced by Pony's illustrations.

==== Mental Wealth ====
Tel-Jeunes and Pony worked together on a mental health campaign in October 2019. This project aimed to address issues that teenagers may experience such as hyper-sexualization and technology addiction. Comedic short films were shared on social media to raise awareness on mental health issues. Pony also created a line of clothes and illustrations around the same theme.

=== Television ===
The first season of Résiste! originally aired on February 9, 2021, on TV5. This cultural magazine, composed of ten episodes, is Tittley's first experience as a television host. For this show, she travels to different cities in North America and Europe and attempts to grasp their cultural and socio-political context through art by meeting locals.
