= Bocci =

- Bocci at Victoria & Albert Museum, 2013
- Type: Private company
- Industry: design
- Founded: 2005; 21 years ago
- Founders: Omer Arbel, Randy Bishop
- Headquarters: Vancouver
- Key people: Omer Arbel (Creative Director); Randy Bishop (CEO)
- Products: lighting, objets, electrical accessories
- Website: BOCCI

Bocci is a Canadian design and manufacturing company based in Vancouver and Berlin, founded in 2005 by Randy Bishop and Omer Arbel. Bocci specializes in sculptural lighting and large light installations.

== History ==
The company began in 2005 after a chance meeting between Randy Bishop and Omer Arbel during New York Design Week. Arbel was exhibiting an early prototype of '14', a cast-glass pendant light and Bishop was attending a candy convention on the floor above. Upon returning to Vancouver, Bishop and Arbel launched Bocci and began production of 14. Bishop currently handles the business side of the company while Arbel is creative director.

== Design ==
 Bocci currently offers seven families of ambient lighting (14, 16, 21, 28, 38, 57 & 73), two design objets (19 & 25) and one collection of electrical accessories (22).[4] The collections are named numerically to reflect their place in the chronology of Arbel's creative process; very few of his designs have commercial viability, hence the gaps between the series numbers.[5]

14 is a cast-glass pendant fastened by a borosilicate glass lamp holder. It can be suspended by coaxial cable in its chandelier form or fastened to the wall as a surface-mount light. It has been described as giving the effect of "a candle floating in water" and is considered a classic piece of Canadian design. 14 received a Red Dot Award and a Good Design Award from the Chicago Athenaeum Museum of Design in 2007.

16 is a new addition to the Bocci collection. It was unveiled as a large outdoor installation on 5 March 2015 at Vancouver's Fairmont Pacific Rim Hotel. 16 has an innovative armature system which carries a low-voltage charge, eliminating the need for interior wiring. The pendants are composed of two-halves made by free pouring three separate layers of hot glass: first milk white, then transparent grey, and finally clear. The two-halves of the piece contain a flat ring-shaped LED lamp that preserves the leaf-like appearance of the finished product, and the "leaves" are attached to a stainless steel armature that may be hung as a chandelier or emerge from the ground in a configuration similar to a tree. 16 is the first piece to use this novel armature system but it will soon be adapted for use in other Bocci collections. 16 will officially debut at Euroluce 2015 in Milan.

19 is an exploration of sand-casting using high copper content brass. A void is made in sand and then filled with molten metal, resulting in a natural overspill that is usually removed in post-production. In the case of 19, the overspill is the highlight of the piece – left raw and oxidized while the centre is polished to a mirror finish. 19 comes in three sizes, each numbered and signed. 19 received a Red Dot Award in 2011.

21 is composed of thin sheets of porcelain draped around a trumpet shaped borosilicate diffuser. The porcelain is allowed to take whatever form comes naturally, and as such each piece is unique. 21 was a finalist for the D&AD Yellow Pencil Award and was awarded "Best of Year" by Interior Design Magazine in 2008.

22 is a suite of electrical accessories that eliminate the need for a visible cover plate. Operative components (such as outlets, switches, and ports) are designed to sit flush with any surface they are mounted to. The 22 series won a Red Dot Award, a Yellow Pencil Yearbook Entry and an iF Design Award in 2009. 22 holds US Patent Numbers 7,956,295 and 8,232,482.

25 is a bench that avoids the traditional upholstery technique of covering foam with fabric, relying rather on excess fabric to provide a comfortable seat. The extra cloth is allowed to fold randomly and changes over time with use. At the time of writing 25 had finished its run and is on indefinite backorder.

28 is a hand-blown glass pendant with randomly composed interior satellites, one of which acts as a lamp holder. The satellites are created using a technique requiring inversion of the direction of airflow into glass and the subsequent creation of a vacuum, resulting in a controlled implosion. 28s may be suspended by coaxial cable or copper wire in chandelier form or mounted directly to the wall. They come in a multitude of colours and won a Red Dot Award in 2012, an iF Design Award in 2011, and a Good Design Award from the Chicago Athenaeum Museum of Design in 2010. The collection debuted at Spazio Rossana Orlandi in Milan in 2010 and was later exhibited on a much grander scale at the Victoria and Albert Museum in 2013.

38 is an extreme exploration of the same glass-blowing technique used to create 28. Large glass spheres are filled with random milk-white satellites, some deep enough to house succulents or cacti plants. 38s are suspended with rigid copper tubing. In 2014 Mallett Antiques played host to a large collection of 38s tumbling down the exterior walls of their building on Dover Street. 38 was "highly commended" at the Architectural Review Emerging Architecture Awards in 2012.

57 explores a technique similar to that used to create closed-cell foam, but using molten glass, resulting in an irregularly shaped pendant with random interior bubbles. The bubbles are invisible until the lamp is turned on, revealing hidden complexity. 57 premiered during Bocci's first showing at Euroluce in 2013 and has since received a Good Design Award from the Chicago Athenaeum Museum of Design. A large installation of 57 pendants was recently unveiled at the re-opening of Canada House on Trafalgar Square in London on 19 February 2015.

73 previewed at the Paris design exhibition Maison & Objet in January 2015. Glass is blown into a heat-resistant ceramic fabric, creating a unique shape and texture for each piece. 73 is meant to be clustered in groups to emphasize the effect of glass "clouds." 73's full range of application will be shown at Euroluce 2015 in Milan alongside 16.

== Projects ==
Bocci often participates in large public installations. In 2013, 280 of the 28 series glass pendants were suspended in the entrance of the Victoria and Albert Museum in London, cascading more than 30 metres down in a tangle of copper wires. In 2014, Arbel worked with Mallett Antiques to infuse their entire showroom with contemporary light installations - examples of 28, 38, and 57 crept through the entire building and spilled out onto Dover Street. Canada's embassy in London was closed for renovations and reopened by Queen Elizabeth II in February 2015 with 157 of Bocci's 57 series highlighting the central staircase. On 5 March 2014, Bocci and Omer Arbel unveiled the new 16 as a large outdoor installation at the entrance to Vancouver's Fairmont Pacific Rim hotel. These ambitious public works appear to have been warmly received. The Royal Architectural Institute of Canada (RAIC) announced on 16 March 2015 that Omer Arbel would be awarded the Allied Arts Medal for 2015 based on the 28.280 at the Victoria and Albert Museum. The award is given once every two years to a Canadian artist or designer for outstanding achievement in artwork designed to be integrated with architecture. After breaking into Euroluce for the first time in 2013, Bocci is set to show again in April 2015. Euroluce 2015 coincides with Bocci's 10th anniversary and announcement of a major Berlin expansion. Bocci recently signed a 10-year lease on a historic 6-storey courthouse in Berlin's Charlottenburg district, with a central staircase destined to act as a laboratory for more ambitious installations. The Berlin office will also have a glassblowing studio meaning Bocci will be in production outside of Vancouver for the first time.

=== 79 ===
Bocci Berlin opened 6 November 2015. The new showroom and 'living archive' features more than 40 rooms showing different products alongside experiments and projects that are not part of the Bocci catalogue. Bocci Berlin will continue the company tradition of in-house manufacturing with the addition of a glassblowing and ceramics studio to the property.
