= Omer Arbel =

Canadian designer and sculptor (born 1976)

- עומר ארבל
- Born: 1976 (age 49–50); Jerusalem, Israel
- Education: Point Grey Secondary, University of Waterloo
- Occupations: Designer, sculptor and creative director of Bocci and OAO
- Known for: Ambient glass lighting, materials research, etc.
- Website: www.omerarbel.com

Omer Arbel (Hebrew: עומר ארבל; born 1976) is a Canadian multidisciplinary artist. His work includes lighting design, architecture, materials research, and site-specific installations. He is one of two co-founders of Bocci. He prioritizes analog processes and traditional skills such as glassblowing, concrete forming, and metalwork in his work.

== Early life ==
Arbel was born and raised in Jerusalem. As a youth, Arbel made it to the Canadian Junior National team and ranking in the top 20 at the Junior World Championships. He competed in fencing for Team Canada at the 1993 Maccabiah Games in Israel.

He received a BSc in environmental science from the University of Waterloo in 1997.

== Career ==
In 2005, Arbel co-founded Bocci, a design and manufacturing company based in Vancouver and Berlin.

Omer’s built work has been exhibited at both the Surrey Art Gallery and the Aedes Architekturforum in Berlin.

=== Sculpture ===
Omer Arbel’s first solo exhibition of sculptural work was shown at the Monte Clark Gallery in Vancouver, in 2015. In 2020, Omer Arbel showed a new series of sculptural works at Carwan Gallery in Athens. The show consisted of 70 unique copper objects and marked the launch of Carwan Gallery’s new exhibition space in Athens.

=== Special Projects ===
In 2010, Arbel was selected to co-design Canada's 2010 Olympic medals in collaboration with Aboriginal artist Corrine Hunt. His original submission, 27.3, included plans for the medals to be held together by invisible magnets, concealing a cavity on the inside where an athlete could store a memento, and having an onsite engraver etch the sounds of the last ten minutes before a medal event onto the medal itself. Financial and practical concerns prevented these plans from being realized.

Arbel's work has been selected for public installations that combine artwork and industrial design. His work has been exhibited at Spazio Rossana Orlandi in Milan, the Art Institute of Chicago, and at the Fairmont Pacific Rim Vancouver, Mallett Antiques, Canada House, and the Victoria and Albert Museum in London. The 2013 Victoria and Albert Museum exhibit featured 280 of the 28 spheres cascading more than 30 meters from the museum's vaulted ceiling. Canada House was reopened in February 2015 with the addition of 157 of Arbel's 57 series lights winding down the central staircase. On March 5, 2015 Arbel unveiled installation of his new 16 series at Vancouver's Fairmont Pacific Rim Hotel. The Royal Architectural Institute of Canada (RAIC) announced on March 16, 2015 that Arbel would be awarded the Allied Arts Medal for 2015 based on his recent work at the Victoria and Albert Museum.

== See also ==
- List of University of Waterloo people
