= Jean Blouf =

New France colonist, pioneer of Vercheres, Quebec, and familial patriarch

Jean Blouf, or Plouf (1643, Paris – 15 April 1700, Montréal), was a pioneer of New France's Quebec. He was one of the colonists of New France in Verchères during 1672, when the lordship there was created under the Kingdom of France.

== Youth ==
Jean Blouf's parents were Antoine Blouf (or Antoine Plouffe) from Abbeville (born 1615), and Geneviève Demest (or DeMetz), from Paris, where they were married 24 February 1641. It has been recognized Jean Blouf had already crossed to the New World in 1665 at the age of 22. He was thus the patriarch of the Blouf, or Plouffe family in the Americas, commonly Americanized to Ploof in the United States of America's northeast.

== Voyage to the New World ==
Many of the French volunteers on the King's voyage to New France were neither persecuted nor poor, but common French Catholics. The voyage was seen as an adventure and opportunity for these young men, many of which were illiterate and of comfortable background but not noble family. Also, the King of France had offered benefits to go to New France. The Company of One Hundred Associates was created in Quebec's lordships then subdivided into concessions to immigrants. These immigrants were often engaged for a period of three years. This was nicknamed the 36 Months. Most recruits were single, paid from 40 to 120 pounds per year. In addition, they were transported to New France and received free land. When Samuel de Champlain died in 1635, there were 132 settlers in the colony, including 35 from the Perche.

Most departures took place in the period 1634–1662. Poor travelers from France to the New World were victims of all the perils of storms, pirates, and disease. The journey could vary from one to three months. For example, it took 117 days for Jean Talon to reach Quebec in 1665, but only 35 days for the ship Arc-en-ciel to do so in 1678. For navigation, it was better to sail from France before 1 May. Boats in the 17th century were generally smaller than 200 tons, so the accommodations were modest. Despite all the difficulties and dangers, the majority of sailors and passengers arrived safely.

== Marriage ==
The first official mention of Jean Blouf in Canada is Ville-Marie in the census of 1666 in Boucherville, while trying to establish a trade as a cobbler. However, he soon left this for the employment under Lord François Jarret de Vercheres, from whom he received a concession of land. The grant consisted of several acres on the side of Contrecoeur. In exchange for the grant, he had to establish residence there. When Jean decided to accept the conditions, he had already been residing there for some time; knowing the resources and climate. This allowed him to quickly acclimate and begin progressing his colonial career.

Meanwhile, on 24 June 1669 in the Chapel of Our Lady of the Hôtel-Dieu in Montreal, Jean married Madeleine Guillebœuf, one of King's Daughters, whom was born in 1655 in Rouen in Normandy. The King's Daughters were 800 young women who volunteered for King Louis XIV of France to immigrate to New France in order to promote colonization through marriage and foundation of families. It was common in those days that men marry before age 30, and women before age 20. She was the daughter of Nicolas and Madeleine Vauclin Guillebœuff, both of Rouen, married there in 1654.

== Legacy ==
Respected in the community, Jean Blouf is also remembered as one of the top ten landowners of Verchères. Most historians believe he was buried in 1700 in Montreal. From his marriage came five boys and two girls, with at least two surviving to go on and have children of their own. The Blouf, or Plouffe family donated land for the first church in Vercheres. After his death, his wife remarried and died in 1708. Thanks to Jean Blouf of Vercheres, thousands of people find themselves today named Plouffe across the North America, including mathematician Simon Plouffe, and a noted American Civil War soldier from New York's North Country named Peter Ploof who was felled for the Union's Straw Hat Regiment in the Battle of Eltham's Landing. The family, due to Jean Blouf's colonial prominence, also gave its name to a district of Laval and a famous novel.

The name of Blouf could correspond to the former French baloffe, or "chaff". Later, it became a surname. Some variations of the name Blouf include: Blouffe, Ploof, Plouff, Plouffe, Pluff, etc..

== Bibliography (Jean Blouf) ==
- Mémoire du Québec
- Chapelle Notre-Dame
