= List of people from Laval, Quebec =

The following is a list of people from Laval, Quebec.

== A ==
- Hicham Aaboubou, Moroccan footballer
- Vincent Auclair, politician
- Donald Audette, ice hockey player

== B ==
- Simon Benoît, ice hockey player
- Rachid Badouri, comedian
- Martine Beaugrand, politician
- Martin Bédard, football player
- Annie Bellemare, figure skater
- Didier Bence, heavyweight boxer
- Jonathan Bernier, ice hockey goaltender
- Raymond Berthiaume, jazz musician
- Samuel Bolduc, ice hockey defenceman
- Mike Bossy, (1957-2022) Hall of Fame ice hockey forward
- Dino Bravo, (1948-1993), professional wrestler

== C ==
- Jos Canale, ice hockey coach
- Robert Carrier, politician
- Gregory Chamitoff, astronaut
- Grégory Charles, singer
- Josée Chouinard, figure skater
- Mathieu Chouinard, former ice hockey goaltender
- Maurice Clermont, former politician
- Charles Comeau, musician
- Michelle Courchesne, politician
- Michel Courtemanche, comedian

== D ==
- Alexandre Daigle, ice hockey player
- Gerry Dattilio, former football player
- Maud Debien, former politician
- Yves Demers, former politician
- Vincent Desharnais, ice hockey player
- Alexandre Despatie, Olympic diver
- Simon Després, ice hockey player
- Danny Desriveaux, football player
- Stéphanie Dubois, tennis player
- Anthony Duclair, ice hockey player
- Alexandre Duplessis, politician
- Pascal Dupuis, ice hockey player
- Philippe Dupuis, ice hockey player

== F ==
- Roseline Filion, diver
- Steven Finn, former ice hockey player
- Jean-François Fortin, ice hockey player
- Stéphane Fortin, former CFL player
- Pier-Luc Funk, actor

== G ==
- Hana Gartner, CBC broadcast journalist and host
- Jean-Sébastien Giguère, ice hockey player
- Jonathan Goldstein, author
- Martin Grenier, ice hockey player

== L ==
- Philippe Laflamme, professional esports player
- Daniel Laperrière, former ice hockey player
- Linda Lapointe, former politician
- Alexandra Larochelle, author
- Simone Leathead, high diver
- Pierre-Évariste Leblanc, late 19th- and early 20th-century politician, deceased
- Sébastien Lefebvre, guitarist
- Félix Lengyel, professional esports player/Twitch streamer
- Carrie Lightbound, kayaker
- John Limniatis, former footballer
- Yannick Lupien, swimmer

== M ==
- Nicolas Macrozonaris, sprinter
- Frank Marino, guitarist
- Martin Matte, comedian
- Guy Mongrain, former game show host and journalist
- Hartland Patrick Monahan, retired ice hockey player

== O ==
- Maryse Ouellet, WWE wrestler
- Gédéon Ouimet, politician, deceased
- Joseph-Aldric Ouimet, politician, deceased

== P ==
- Jean Pascal, professional boxer
- Alfred Pellan, painter, deceased
- Francine Pelletier, science fiction writer
- Yves P. Pelletier, actor, director, writer, comedian
- Éric Perrin, retired ice hockey centre
- Carl-Olivier Primé, football player

== R ==
- Lucien Rivard, criminal
- Yvon Robert, wrestler, deceased
- Frank Rochon, former ice hockey player

== S ==
- Clément-Charles Sabrevois de Bleury, 19th-century soldier, lawyer, politician and newspaper founder
- Martin St. Louis, retired ice hockey player, current head coach of the Montreal Canadiens (NHL)
- Sandra Sassine, fencer
- Eliezer Sherbatov (born 1991), Canadian-Israeli ice hockey player
- Jeff Stinco, musician
- Howard Stupp (born 1955), Olympic wrestler

== T ==
- Joseph Tassé, 19th-century writer, translator, and parliamentarian
- José Théodore, retired NHL goalie
- Jocelyn Thibault, retired NHL goalie

== V ==
- Maïla Valentir, actress
- Jeannine Vanier, composer and organist
- Liette Vasseur, biologist, President of the Canadian Commission for UNESCO
- Tania Vicent, short track speed skater
- Pascal Vincent, current head coach of the Columbus Blue Jackets (NHL)
- Claude Vivier, composer and musicologist

== Y ==
- Joel Yanofsky, writer and columnist

== Z ==
- Sami Zayn, WWE wrestler

== See also ==
- List of people from Quebec
- List of people from Quebec City
- List of people from Montreal
- List of people from Ontario
- List of people from Toronto
