= Jacqueline Dupuis =

Canadian executive director (born 1973/4)

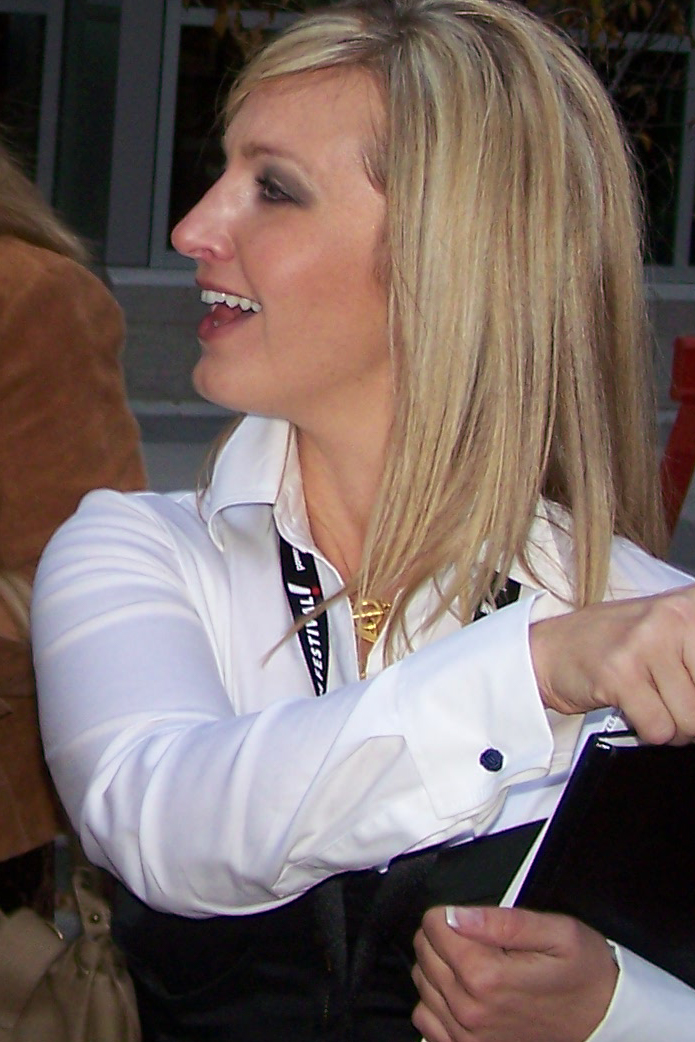
- Jacqueline Dupuis in Calgary (2007)
- Born: 1973 or 1974 (age 51–52); Biggar, Saskatchewan
- Citizenship: Canadian
- Education: University of Saskatchewan
- Board member of: CIFF, VIFF

Jacqueline Dupuis is a Canadian who was executive director of the Calgary International Film Festival and the Vancouver International Film Festival (VIFF).

== Early life ==
Dupuis grew up on a farm in Biggar, Saskatchewan. She was a student of economics at the University of Saskatchewan. After graduation, she worked in the tech sector for Sun Microsystems (later acquired by Oracle) and Xerox.

== Career ==
Dupuis was the executive director of the CIFF for six years. According to Marsha Lederman of The Globe and Mail, she was responsible for "pulling the Calgary International Film Festival from the brink of insolvency." Eric Volmers of the Calgary Herald said that she increased the cultural impact of the festival on the city during her time as executive director, despite cuts to government and corporate funding.

Dupuis joined VIFF in 2012 as its first executive director. During the eight years Dupuis was with the VIFF, which ended in 2019, the festival experienced a growth of 40 per cent. Dupuis expanded the programming of VIFF to include virtual reality and gaming.
