= Roland Michel Tremblay =

Canadian author (born 1972)

Roland Michel Tremblay (born October 15, 1972, in Quebec City, Quebec) is a French Canadian author, poet, scriptwriter, development producer and science-fiction consultant. He has been living in London since 1995.

== Biography ==
Roland Michel Tremblay was born in Quebec City but moved to the Saguenay-Lac-Saint-Jean region in the North of the Quebec province when he was 7 years old. He obtained a college diploma in Sciences from the CEGEP de Jonquière in 1991, and a B.A. in French Literature and Philosophy from the University of Ottawa in Ontario in 1994. He studied one year at La Sorbonne in Paris and finished his master's degree in French Literature at Birkbeck, University of London in 1999.

He has been writing since he was 10 years old, and lived in Canada, France, Belgium, the United States and the United Kingdom. He is now an author and technical adviser, writing novels, essays, poetry, television and film scripts. He has six books published in French in Paris by iDLivre and GT Publishers, and his books are distributed in many French-speaking countries.

Tremblay has written poetry, novels and film scripts mostly in English. He developed a science fiction website aimed at helping authors working in the genre for television. He lived in Los Angeles during 2005 and 2006, but then returned to live in Isleworth, West London.

Roland Michel Tremblay is not related to Michel Tremblay, one of the most celebrated authors in Quebec. He is openly gay.

== Bibliography ==
Published literary work in French

- Eclecticism (philosophical essay), ISBN 2-7479-0014-2
- Waiting for Paris (novel), ISBN 2-7479-0018-5
- Denfert-Rochereau (novel), ISBN 2-7479-0012-6
- The Anarchist (poetry), ISBN 2-7479-0013-4
- A French-Canadian in Paris (journal/essay), ISBN 2-914679-10-6
- A French-Canadian in New York (journal/essay), ISBN 2-914679-12-2

Produced work in television (development producer/science consultant) (uncredited)

- Strange Days at Blake Holsey High (Black Hole High, 2002) (NBC and Discovery Channel Television Series)
- E=mc², The World's Most Famous Equation (WGBH/PBS, Channel 4 UK and Arte Documentary, 2003)
