= List of people from Edmonton =

The City of Edmonton, Alberta, Canada, has been the birthplace or a home to numerous famous individuals. Additionally, many Edmontonians have become worthy of note through their various charitable activities, donations, and contributions.

== Actors and actresses ==
- Lisa Gilroy (born 1989), comedian and actress
- Beverly Adams (born 1945), former actress
- Dana Alexander, comedian
- Melody Anderson (born 1955), former actress
- Tori Anderson (born 1988), actress
- Nathaniel Arcand (born 1971), actor
- Gary Basaraba (born 1959), actor
- Michelle Beaudoin (born 1975), actress
- Genevieve Buechner (born 1991), actress
- Terry Chen (born 1975), film and television actor
- Rae Dawn Chong (born 1961), Canadian-born American actress; daughter of Maxine Sneed and Tommy Chong
- Tommy Chong (born 1938), comedian, actor and musician
- Billy Chow (born 1958), Hong Kong actor and martial artist
- Ben Cotton (born 1975), film and television actor
- Trevor Devall (born 1972), voice actor, born in Edmonton
- Paula Devicq (born 1965), actress
- Rosemary Dunsmore (born 1953), TV, film, and theatre actress
- Nathan Fillion (born 1971), film and television actor
- Dianne Foster (1928–2019), film and television actress
- Michael J. Fox (born 1961), film and television actor
- Patrick Gilmore (born 1976), film and television actor
- Grace Glowicki, actress and filmmaker
- Robert Goulet (1933–2007), singer and film actor
- Meghan Heffern (born 1983), actress
- Jill Hennessy (born 1968), television actress and musician
- Jimmy Herman (1940–2013), First Nations actor
- Eric Johnson (born 1979), actor
- Keltie Knight (born 1982), professional dancer, television presenter and 1/3 of the LadyGang podcast
- Theresa Lee (born 1970), Hong Kong actress and Miss Hong Kong runner-up
- Niall Matter (born 1980), actor
- Bruce McCulloch (born 1961), actor, writer, comedian, and film director
- Kathleen McGee, stand-up comedian
- Wendel Meldrum (1959–2021), actress
- Leslie Nielsen (1926–2010), film and television actor
- Steven Ogg (born 1973), actor
- Ron Pederson (born 1978), stage and screen actor
- Chelsey Reist (born 1987), actress
- Callum Keith Rennie (born 1960), film and television actor
- Lisa Ryder (born 1970), actress
- Nancy Sivak
- Kavan Smith (born 1970), actor
- Catherine Mary Stewart (born 1959), film and television actor
- Ryan Stock, TV circus stuntman
- Kenneth Welsh (1942–2022), film and television actor

== Business ==
- Greg Abel (born 1962), CEO of Berkshire Hathaway
- Jack Agrios (born 1938), lawyer
- Bernard Ebbers (1941–2020), WorldCom co-founder
- Paul Graham, vice-president and executive producer of The Sports Network
- Daryl Katz (born 1961), chairman and chief executive officer of the Katz Group; owner of the Edmonton Oilers
- Ray Muzyka (born 1969), co-founder, BioWare Corp
- Ricken Patel (born 1977), founding president and executive director of Avaaz
- Barb Tarbox (1961–2003), anti-smoking activist
- Allan Wachowich (born 1935), former Chief Justice of the Court of Queen's Bench of Alberta
- Max Ward (1921–2020), aviator and founder of Wardair airline
- Greg Zeschuk (born 1969), co-founder of BioWare Corp

== Explorers and pioneers ==
- Punch Dickins (1899–1995), aviator and bush pilot; the Dickinsfield community was named in his honour

== Musicians ==
- Violet Archer (1913–2000), composer
- Ardn, rapper
- Ruth B (born 1995), singer-songwriter
- H. Hugh Bancroft (1904–1988), church musician and composer
- Tommy Banks (1936–2018), musician
- Moe Berg (born 1959), singer-songwriter
- George Blondheim (1956–2020), pianist and composer
- Bill Bourne (1954–2022), folk and blues singer-songwriter, three-time Juno Award winner
- Harpdog Brown (1962–2022), blues musician
- Brox Sisters, singers (Brock sisters)
- Cadence Weapon (Rollie Pemberton; born 1986), rapper
- Beatrice Carmichael (1889–1964), grand dame of the opera
- Ken Chinn (a.k.a. Chi Pig; 1962–2020), lead singer-songwriter and band leader of SNFU
- Clinker, sound artist, composer, and visual artist
- Stu Davis (1921–2007), singer-songwriter, guitarist, internationally known as "Canada's Cowboy Troubadour"
- Mac DeMarco (born 1990), indie rock musician
- Jean Dubé (born 1981), pianist
- Trevor Dunn (born 1968), guitarist, member of 1970's group Fifth Avenue Allstars
- Tim Feehan (born 1957), artist, singer-songwriter, producer, co-owner of Los Angeles recording studio Backroom, mix master
- Malcolm Forsyth (1936–2011), composer
- Jay Fung, Hong Kong Cantopop singer-songwriter
- Allan Gilliland (born 1965), composer
- G.NA (Choi Ji-Na; born 1987), Korean singer
- Dwayne Goettel (1964–1995), keyboardist for Skinny Puppy
- Adam Gregory (born 1985), singer
- Brian Hughes (born 1955), smooth jazz guitarist
- JackEL (born 1996), DJ, record producer and songwriter
- Cassius Khan, Indian classical tabla player and ghazal singer, recipient of Salute to Excellence Award
- Morgan Lander, singer-songwriter
- k.d. lang (born 1961), singer-songwriter
- Ariane Mahrÿke Lemire, singer-songwriter
- Jens Lindemann, trumpet soloist
- Cameron Melnyk, lead singer of Canadian rock band State of Shock
- Big Miller (1922–1992), jazz and blues singer
- Maren Ord, singer-songwriter
- P.J. Perry, jazz saxophonist
- Quanteisha, singer
- Lester Quitzau, Folk and blues guitarist
- Jan Randall, composer
- Carmen Rasmusen (born 1985), country music artist
- Alyssa Reid, singer-songwriter
- Josh Sahunta, pop/R&B singer-songwriter
- Sean Nicholas Savage, indie singer-songwriter
- Shiloh, singer-songwriter
- Jay Sparrow, singer-songwriter
- Mark Spicoluk (born 1979), musician
- Kreesha Turner, singer-songwriter
- Ella May Walker, composer
- Tom MacDonald (born 1988), rapper, singer-songwriter
- Alex Calder (1989–2026), indie musician

== National service ==
- Russ Bannock (1919–2020), Canada's second-highest scoring ace of World War II
- Roy Brown, Canadian flying ace in World War I, officially credited with shooting down the Red Baron, though this is now subject to debate
- Edmund De Wind, Irish-Canadian British Army officer in World War I, recipient of the Victoria Cross
- Wop May, Canadian flying ace in World War I, the last pilot to be pursued by Manfred von Richthofen, the Red Baron, prior to his death, also a celebrated bush pilot
- Nellie McClung (1873–1951), first woman appointed to the Board of Governors of the CBC (1936); one of The Famous Five
- Emily Murphy (1868–1933), first female magistrate in British Empire and petitioned Supreme Court of Canada to allow women the vote; one of the Famous Five; has received modern scrutiny for her support for eugenics
- Douglas Roche (born 1929), O.C., former M.P., Senator, U.N. Ambassador, nuclear disarmament figure, author, and journalist
- William Smith Ziegler (1911–1999), artillery commander of the 1st Canadian Division in the Second World War

== Politicians ==
- Mark Carney (born 1965), 24th Prime Minister of Canada, former Governor of the Bank of England and Chairman of the G20's Financial Stability Board; former governor of the Bank of Canada
- William Humberstone (1836–1922), politician in Alberta, and a municipal councillor in Edmonton
- Don Iveson (born 1979), mayor from 2013 to 2021
- Marcel Lambert (1919–2000), politician
- Stephen Mandel (born 1945), mayor from 2004 to 2013, Alberta minister of health from 2014 to 2015, and leader of the Alberta Party from 2018 to 2019
- Sherry McKibben (born 1944), politician
- Rachel Notley (born 1964), 17th Premier of Alberta
- Michael Phair (born 1950), politician
- Richard R. Verma (born 1968), diplomat

== Religion ==
- Seraphim Storheim (born 1946), former senior hierarch for the Orthodox Church in America

== Scientists ==
- John Acorn, naturalist, lecturer at the University of Alberta, research associate at the Royal Tyrrell Museum of Paleontology, and research associate at the E.H. Strickland Entomology Museum
- Karl Clark (1888–1966), University of Alberta professor and inventor of oil sands extraction technology
- Jillianne Code (born 1976), researcher and learning scientist
- Werner Israel (1931–2022), physicist
- Raymond Lemieux (1920–2000), organic chemist
- Diane Loranger, geologist, paleontologist
- Jordan Peterson (born 1962), clinical psychologist, cultural critic, and professor of psychology at the University of Toronto
- Gary Purdy (born 1936), materials scientist and engineer, professor
- Gordon Walter Semenoff (born 1953), theoretical physicist
- Dr. Lorne Warneke (1942–2020), clinical psychiatrist and gender identity specialist at the Grey Nuns Community Hospital; transgender rights activist

== Sports personalities ==
=== Bobsledding ===
- David Bissett (born 1979), Olympic bobsledder
- Jennifer Ciochetti (born 1984), bobsledder
- Pierre Lueders (born 1970), bobsledder
- Jesse Lumsden (born 1982), bobsledder and football player
- Neville Wright (born 1980), bobsledder

=== Boxing ===
- Al Ford (born 1950), professional boxer and CBF Lightweight Champion
- Ryan Ford (born 1982), professional boxer and retired mixed martial arts fighter
- Kelly Perlette, light middle-weight boxing gold medal at the 1978 Commonwealth Games
- Adam Trupish (born 1979), boxer

=== Curling ===
- Jessica Amundson (born 1984), curler
- Joanne Courtney (born 1989), curler
- Randy Ferbey (born 1959), multiple Canadian and World Men's Curling Champion
- Heather Kalenchuk (born 1984), curler
- Cathy King (born 1959), curler, from St Albert
- Jamie King (born 1973), curler
- Renée Sonnenberg (born 1971), curler

=== Ice hockey ===
- Dave Babych (born 1961), ice hockey defenceman
- Wayne Babych (born 1958), ice hockey player
- Shawn Belle (born 1985), ice hockey defenceman
- Brian Benning (born 1966), ice hockey defenceman
- Jim Benning (born 1963), ice hockey defenceman and executive
- Matt Benning (born 1994), ice hockey defenceman
- Blair Betts (born 1980), ice hockey player
- Tom Bladon (born 1952), ice hockey defenceman
- Roger Bourbonnais (born 1942), ice hockey player
- Jay Bouwmeester (born 1983), ice hockey defenceman
- Johnny Boychuk (born 1984), ice hockey defenceman
- Gilbert Brulé (born 1987), ice hockey player
- Johnny Bucyk (born 1935), ice hockey player
- Jason Chimera (born 1979), ice hockey player
- Erik Christensen (born 1983), ice hockey player
- Mac Colville (1916–2003), early star in the NHL
- Neil Colville (1914–1987), early star in the NHL
- Marcel Comeau (born 1952), Canadian ice hockey coach and NHL executive
- Mike Commodore (born 1978), ice hockey player
- Eric Comrie (born 1995), ice hockey goaltender
- Mike Comrie (born 1980), ice hockey player
- Kirby Dach (born 2001), ice hockey player
- Jake DeBrusk (born 1996), ice hockey player
- Gerald Diduck (born 1965), ice hockey defenceman
- Tyler Ennis (born 1989), ice hockey player
- Andrew Ference (born 1979), ice hockey defenceman
- Vernon Fiddler (born 1980), ice hockey player
- Mark Fistric (born 1986), ice hockey defenceman
- Matt Frattin (born 1988), ice hockey right winger
- Brendan Gallagher (born 1992), ice hockey player
- Donald Gauf (1927–2014), ice hockey player
- Randy Gregg (born 1956), ice hockey defenceman
- Noah Gregor (born 1998), ice hockey player
- Dylan Guenther (born 2003), ice hockey player
- W. G. Hardy (1895–1979), President of the Canadian Amateur Hockey Association and the Alberta Amateur Hockey Association
- Greg Hawgood (born 1968), ice hockey defenceman
- Ken Hitchcock (born 1951), ice hockey coach and scout
- Kelly Hrudey (born 1961), ice hockey player
- Jarome Iginla (born 1977), ice hockey player
- Brad Isbister (born 1977), ice hockey player
- Ken Johannson (1930–2018), Canadian-born American ice hockey player, coach and executive
- Eddie Joyal (born 1940), ice hockey player
- Dustin Kohn (born 1987), ice hockey player
- John Kordic (1965–1992), ice hockey player
- Daymond Langkow (born 1976), ice hockey player
- Bryan Little (born 1987), ice hockey player
- Jamie Lundmark (born 1981), ice hockey forward
- Joffrey Lupul (born 1983), ice hockey player
- Bruce MacGregor (born 1941), NHL player and management
- Richard Matvichuk (born 1973), ice hockey player
- Ken McAuley (1921–1992), goaltender for the NHL New York Rangers; husband of Mildred Warwick McAuley
- Mark Messier (born 1961), ice hockey player
- Derek Morris (born 1978), ice hockey player
- Scott Nichol (born 1974), ice hockey player
- Scott Niedermayer (born 1973), ice hockey defenceman
- Ben Ondrus (born 1982), ice hockey player
- Greg Parks (1967–2015), ice hockey player
- Eric Paterson (1929–2014), ice hockey player
- Alex Petrovic (born 1992), ice hockey defenceman
- Matt Pettinger (born 1980), ice hockey player
- Dion Phaneuf (born 1985), ice hockey defenceman
- Fernando Pisani (born 1976), ice hockey player
- Justin Pogge (born 1986), AHL hockey player
- Art Potter (1909–1998), president of the Canadian Amateur Hockey Association and the Alberta Amateur Hockey Association
- Mark Pysyk (born 1992), ice hockey player
- Steve Regier (born 1984), ice hockey player
- Steven Reinprecht (born 1976), ice hockey player
- Phil Russell (born 1952), ice hockey defenceman
- David Schlemko (born 1987), ice hockey player
- John Scott (born 1982), ice hockey player
- Danielle Serdachny (born 2001) – ice hockey player
- Stuart Skinner (born 1998), ice hockey goaltender
- Colin Smith (born 1993), ice hockey player
- Harold Snepsts (born 1954), ice hockey defenceman
- Jared Spurgeon (born 1989), ice hockey player
- Jason Strudwick (born 1975), ice hockey defenceman
- Brian Sutherby (born 1982), ice hockey centre
- Darryl Sydor (born 1972), ice hockey player
- Shannon Szabados (born 1986), ice hockey goaltender and two-time Olympic Women's gold medal winner
- Garry Valk (born 1967), ice hockey player and broadcaster
- Cam Ward (born 1984), ice hockey goaltender
- Darcy Werenka (born 1973), Canadian-Austrian ice hockey defenceman
- Ray Whitney (born 1972), ice hockey player
- Zarley Zalapski (1968–2017), ice hockey defenceman

=== Skating ===
- Jamie Gregg (born 1985), long track speed skater
- Jessica Gregg (born 1988), short track speed skater
- Josie Morrison (born 1994), speed skater
- Natasha Purich (born 1995), pair skater

=== Skiing ===
- Stanley Hayer (born 1973), Canadian freestyle skier of Czech descent
- Jennifer Heil (born 1983), freestyle skier born in Spruce Grove, Alberta
- Dusty Korek (born 1995), Canadian ski jumper of Polish descent
- Ed Podivinsky (born 1970), Canadian Alpine skier of Czech descent
- Stefan Read (born 1987), ski jumper

=== Soccer ===
- Asmir Begović (born 1987), goalkeeper who represented the Bosnia and Herzegovina national team
- Alphonso Davies (born 2000), captain of the Canadian national soccer team
- Chuck Dubuque (1932–2020), HB soccer player
- Daniel Fernandes (born 1983), Portuguese Canadian professional soccer player
- Lars Hirschfeld (born 1978), soccer goalkeeper
- Stephanie Labbé (born 1986), soccer goalkeeper for the Canadian Women's National Team, Olympic gold medalist
- Erin McLeod (born 1983), soccer goalkeeper, Olympic bronze medalist
- Tosaint Ricketts (born 1987), soccer player

=== Wrestling ===
- Chris Benoit (1967–2007), professional wrestler
- Gene Kiniski (1928–2010), professional wrestler

=== Other sports ===
- Marco Arop (born 1998), track and field
- Ewan Beaton (born 1969), judoka
- Gary Beck (born 1941), two-time world champion drag racer and member of the Canadian Motorsport Hall of Fame
- Art Boileau (born 1957), Olympic marathon runner
- Robin Clegg (born 1977), biathlete
- Michelle Conn (born 1963), field hockey player
- John Ducey (1908–1983), baseball executive and umpire
- Robert Easton (born 1960/1961), Paralympian, wheelchair athlete, won three gold medals at the 1988 Seoul Paralympics
- David Ford (born 1967), kayaker
- Forrest Gainer (born 1979), rugby union player
- Blythe Hartley (born 1982), diver
- Chuba Hubbard (born 1999), NFL running back
- Mary Imrie (1918–1988), architect
- Ed Kucy (born 1971), CFL player
- Lawrence Lemieux, sailor, competed at the 1984 Summer Olympics in the Star class and at the 1988 Summer Olympics in the Finn class
- Jason MacDonald (born 1975), UFC fighter
- Rod Phillips (born 1941), radio broadcaster for 630 CHED
- Annamay Pierse (born 1983), swimmer born in Toronto and raised in Edmonton
- John "Red" Pollard (1909–1981), jockey of the famous horse Seabiscuit
- Doug Pruden, multiple world records in push ups
- Mike Robertson (born 1985), snowboarder
- Alison Sydor (born 1966), cross country mountain cyclist
- Lwal Uguak (born 2000), CFL defensive end
- Delwin Vriend (born 1966), teacher and activist
- Jean Wallbridge (1912–1979), architect
- Mildred Warwick (1922–2006), All-American Girls Professional Baseball League player; wife of Ken McAuley

== Writers and artists ==
- Robert T. Anderson, poet
- Makram Ayache, playwright
- Will Beauchamp, filmmaker
- Ted Bishop, author of Riding with Rilke
- Andrew Brook (born 1943), philosopher, author of Kant and the Mind
- Can Man Dan (Dan Lee Johnstone) (born in Edmonton in 1987), anti-poverty and social activist, philanthropist, and author
- Gil Cardinal (1950–2015), filmmaker
- Judith Clute (born in Edmonton in 1942), painter, graphic designer, print-maker, and illustrator
- Patrick Cox (born 1963), shoe designer
- Harold F. Cruickshank (1893–1979), pulp-fiction author
- James DeFelice, playwright and screenwriter
- Gordon R. Dickson (1923–2001), science fiction writer
- Brion Gysin (1916–1986), artist and writer
- W. G. Hardy (1895–1979), professor, writer, ice hockey administrator, Member of the Order of Canada
- Peter Hide (born 1944), British-born sculptor, living in Edmonton since 1977
- Arthur Hiller (1923–2016), Hollywood film director and former president of the Directors Guild of America
- Carl Honoré (born 1967), grew up in Edmonton; journalist and author of In Praise of Slowness
- Mel Hurtig (1932–2016), publisher, author, and politician
- Drew Karpyshyn (born 1971), video game scenario writer, scriptwriter, and novelist
- Conor Kerr (born 1988), author of Avenue of Champions
- W. P. Kinsella, author of Shoeless Joe which became the film Field of Dreams; tournament Scrabble player
- Samuel Edward Konkin III, founder of the libertarian social philosophy agorism
- Myrna Kostash, writer of eight books including All of Baba's Children
- Stewart Lemoine, playwright
- Austin Mardon (born 1962), author, community leader and disability rights advocate
- Ryan McCourt, visual artist
- Marshall McLuhan, recipient of numerous awards and appointments, pioneer of media theory
- Conor McNally, documentary filmmaker
- Iman Mersal, poet
- Richard Newman, writer, broadcaster, and reality TV star, best known for participating in the seventh series of the British version of Big Brother
- Wendy Orr (born 1968), Canadian-born Australian writer
- Kelly Oxford, writer, New York Times bestselling author of Everything Is Perfect When You're a Liar
- T. W. Peacocke, television and film director
- Jean Paré (1927–2022), author and publisher of the Company's Coming cookbook series
- Robert Young Pelton, author
- Tom Radford, documentary filmmaker
- Phyllis Seckler (1917–2004), ninth degree (IX°) member of the "Sovereign Sanctuary of the Gnosis" of Ordo Templi Orientis
- Brent Shaw (born 1947), historian
- Quinn Slobodian (born 1978), historian and author
- Robert W. Smith, historian
- Gail Sidonie Sobat, poet, novelist, educator, founder/director of “Youthwrite” and “Spoken Word Youth Choir”
- Ella May Walker, artist and writer

== Others ==
- Kerry Pawluski, medical doctor and pilot
- Krew, group of YouTuber siblings consisting of ItsFunneh, GoldenGlare, DraconiteDragon, LunarEclipse, and PaintingRainbows
- Gene Principe, sports newscast, sports field reporter
- Sam Forster, writer, journalist
- Steve Wallis, "Camping With Steve" YouTuber

== See also ==
- List of people from British Columbia
- List of people from Calgary
- List of people from Montreal
- List of people from Ontario
- List of people from Quebec
- List of people from Quebec City
- List of people from Toronto
- List of people from Vancouver
