= List of people from Alberta =

Provincial flag of Alberta

Map and location of Alberta in Canada

This is a list of notable people who are from Alberta, Canada, or have spent a large part or formative part of their career in that province.

== A ==
- William Aberhart – former premier of Alberta
- John Acorn – naturalist, lecturer at the University of Alberta, research associate at the Royal Tyrrell Museum of Paleontology, and research associate at the E.H. Strickland Entomology Museum
- Ernie Afaganis – sports broadcaster for the Canadian Broadcasting Corporation
- Jack Agrios – lawyer
- David Albahari – Serbian-born author
- Melody Anderson – former actress
- Violet Archer – composer
- Jann Arden – singer
- Rob Armitage – curler
- Margaret-Ann Armour – chemist, academic, advocate for women in science, technology and engineering
- Mark Astley – National Hockey League player
- Geoff Aunger – soccer player

== B ==
- Ruth B – singer/songwriter and musician
- Conrad Bain – actor
- Tommy Banks – musician
- Doug Barkley – hockey player
- Cori Bartel – curler
- Hank Bassen – National Hockey League goalie
- Nolan Baumgartner – professional ice hockey player
- Frances Bay – actress and comedian
- Jay Beagle – National Hockey League player
- Will Beauchamp – filmmaker
- Michelle Beaudoin – actress
- Gary Beck – two-time world champion drag racer and member of the Canadian Motorsport Hall of Fame
- Chelsey Bell – curler
- Jill Belland – television host and producer
- Richard Bennett – former prime minister of Canada
- Chris Benoit – professional wrestler
- Roloff Beny – photographer
- Moe Berg – singer/songwriter
- Cheryl Bernard – curler
- Blair Betts – ice hockey player
- Manmeet Bhullar – Progressive Conservative politician
- Martha Bielish – politician, farmer, feminist, teacher and senator
- Earle Birney – poet
- Ted Bishop – author of Riding with Rilke
- David Bissett – Olympic bobsledder
- Rosella Bjornson – first female pilot for a commercial airline in North America
- Heather Blush – singer
- Arthur Boileau – Olympic marathon runner
- Bill Borger – first Canadian to both swim the English Channel and climb Mount Everest
- Tyler Bouck – professional hockey player currently with the ERC Ingolstadt of the Deutsche Eishockey Liga
- Bill Bourne – folk and blues singer songwriter, three-time Juno Award winner
- Jay Bouwmeester – ice hockey player
- Trevor Boys – NASCAR driver
- Paul Brandt – country music singer
- Kaitlyn Bristowe – reality television personality
- Bertram Brockhouse – Nobel Prize winner
- Andrew Brook – philosopher, author of Kant and the Mind
- Brox Sisters – singers
- Gilbert Brulé – ice hockey player
- Johnny Bucyk – ice hockey player
- Genevieve Buechner – actress
- Georges Bugnet – French Canadian writer and plant hybridiser
- Ronnie Burkett – puppeteer
- Nate Burleson – professional American football player, Detroit Lions
- Pat Burns – rancher, businessman, and senator

== C ==
- Don Cairns – professional ice hockey player
- Pearl Calahasen – politician, first Métis woman elected to public office in Alberta
- Eric Cameron – visual artist
- Elaine Cameron-Weir – visual artist
- Tommy Campbell – actor and stand-up comedian
- Janet Cardiff – artist
- Celeigh Cardinal – singer-songwriter
- Douglas Cardinal – architect
- Gil Cardinal – filmmaker
- Tantoo Cardinal – actress
- Beatrice Carmichael – grand dame of the opera
- Mark Carney – governor of the Bank of England and chairman of the G20's Financial Stability Board; former governor of the Bank of Canada, 24th prime minister of Canada
- Thelma Chalifoux – Métis social justice activist, politician, and senator
- Sean Cheesman – dancer and choreographer
- Terry Chen – film and television actor
- Jason Chimera – ice hockey player
- Ken Chinn (a.k.a. Chi Pig) – lead singer, songwriter and bandleader of SNFU
- Rae Dawn Chong – Canadian-born American actress, daughter of Maxine Sneed and Tommy Chong
- Tommy Chong – comedian, actor and musician
- Erik Christensen – ice hockey player
- Joe Clark – businessman, writer, politician and 16th prime minister of Canada
- Karl Clark – U of A professor and inventor of oil sands extraction technology
- Allen Coage – professional wrestler known as "Bad News Allen"
- Mac Colville – early star in the National Hockey League
- Neil Colville – early star in the National Hockey League
- Mike Commodore – ice hockey player
- Mike Comrie – ice hockey player
- Michelle Conn – field hockey player
- Patrick Cox – shoe designer
- Paul Cranmer – former CFL player
- Gavin Crawford – actor
- Rafael Cruz – Cuban-born Canadian/American Christian preacher and public speaker; lived in Calgary and later Houston, Texas; father of Ted Cruz
- Ted Cruz – Canadian/American politician and current U.S. senator for the state of Texas; born in Calgary but grew up in Houston, Texas
- Philip Currie – Canadian palaeontologist and museum curator
- Elisha Cuthbert – actress, moved to Montreal at a very young age, and remained there until she moved to Los Angeles

== D ==
- Kirby Dach – professional hockey player
- John Dahmer – politician
- Cal Dallas – politician
- Carolyn Darbyshire – curler
- Carol-Anne Day – voice actress
- Jason Day – mixed martial arts fighter
- Jake DeBrusk – professional hockey player
- Louie DeBrusk – former professional hockey player; current Hockey Night in Canada colour analyst
- Kris Demeanor – poet, musician and actor
- Kent Derricott – actor
- Paula Devicq – actress
- Punch Dickins – aviator and bush pilot; the Dickinsfield community was named in his honour
- Shane Doan – professional hockey player
- Michael Dowse – film director
- Earl Dreeshen – politician
- Darren Dreger – sportscaster
- Trevor Dunn – guitarist, member of 1970s group Fifth Avenue Allstars
- Erica Durance – actress, born in Calgary but raised in Three Hills
- Ryan Duthie – ice hockey player

== E ==
- Bernard Ebbers – WorldCom co-founder
- Brad Erdos – gridiron football player
- Darren Espanto – Filipino-Canadian child singer
- Lance Evers – professional wrestler known as "Lance Storm"

== F ==
- Joyce Fairbairn – senator
- Anne Fanning – physician, academic, and expert in tuberculosis
- Tim Feehan – artist, singer/songwriter, producer, co-owner of Los Angeles recording studio Backroom, mix master
- Leslie Feist – singer/songwriter born in Amherst, Nova Scotia, then moved to Calgary as a child
- John Fennell – luger
- Randy Ferbey – multiple Canadian and World Men's Curling Champion
- Andrew Ference – ice hockey player
- Scott Ferguson – retired professional hockey player
- Nathan Fillion – film and television actor
- Brandon Firla – actor
- David Ford – kayaker
- Helen Forrester (June Huband Bhatia) – Anglo-Canadian author
- Malcolm Forsyth – composer
- Dianne Foster – film and television actress
- George Fox – country music singer/songwriter
- Michael J. Fox – film and television actor
- Brad Fraser – playwright
- Matt Fraser – ice hockey player
- Chrystia Freeland – journalist, politician, deputy prime minister
- William Fruet – film and television writer and director
- Grant Fuhr – ice hockey player born in Spruce Grove, Alberta, an Edmonton suburb

== G ==
- Forrest Gainer – rugby union player
- Brendan Gallagher – ice hockey player
- Lynn Garrison – aviator, author and mercenary
- Austin Gary – author and songwriter
- Onalea Gilbertson – voice actress
- Allan Gilliland – composer
- Patrick Gilmore – film and television actor
- John Glenn – Calgary's earliest recorded European settler
- Dwayne Goettel – musician, member of industrial band Skinny Puppy
- Erving Goffman – sociologist
- James Gosling – creator of the Java programming language
- Jurgen Gothe – radio broadcaster
- Robert Goulet – singer and film actor
- Henry Grattan Nolan – lawyer and soldier
- Josh Green – retired professional hockey player
- Mike Green – professional hockey player (Detroit Red Wings)
- Mary Greene (1843–1933) – mother superior and educator, established first Roman Catholic school board in Alberta
- Jessica Gregg – short track speed skater
- Randy Gregg – ice hockey player
- Adam Gregory – singer
- Paul Gross – actor
- Brion Gysin – artist and writer

== H ==
- Taylor Hall – professional hockey player
- Owen Hargreaves – professional footballer, plays for Manchester City
- Stephen Harper – former politician and prime minister of Canada (2006–2015); former leader of the Conservative Party of Canada
- Richard Harrison – poet
- Bret Hart – professional wrestler
- Owen Hart – professional wrestler
- Stu Hart – professional wrestler, promoter and trainer
- Teddy Hart – professional wrestler
- Dr. Helen Hays – physician, medical pioneer in chronic pain and palliative care
- Dar Heatherington – politician
- Dany Heatley – professional ice hockey player (Minnesota Wild)
- Ben Hebert – curler
- Meghan Heffern – actress
- Jennifer Heil – freestyle skier born in Spruce Grove, Alberta
- Tricia Helfer – model and actress born in Donalda, Alberta
- Jill Hennessy – television actor
- Jimmy Herman – First Nations actor
- Peter Hide – British-born sculptor, living in Edmonton since 1977
- Stuart Hilborn – automotive engineer
- Arthur Hiller – Hollywood film director and former president of the Directors Guild of America
- David Hoffos – contemporary artist
- Lois Hole – gardener, Alberta's 15th lieutenant governor
- Carl Honoré – grew up in Edmonton; journalist and author of In Praise of Slowness
- Richard Hortness – Olympic swimmer
- Dakota House – actor, politician, writer and activist
- Kelly Hrudey – ice hockey player
- Jan Hudec – alpine ski racer
- Brian Hughes – smooth jazz guitarist
- William Humberstone – politician in Alberta; municipal councillor in Edmonton
- Tim Hunter – professional National Hockey League player (won the Stanley Cup with the Flames in 1989)
- Mel Hurtig – publisher, author, and politician
- Nancy Huston – novelist; born in Calgary, left at age 15

== I ==
- Jarome Iginla – National Hockey League player
- Mary Imrie – architect
- Earl Ingarfield, Sr. – hockey player
- Brad Isbister – ice hockey player
- Werner Israel – physicist
- Marshal Iwaasa – man who mysteriously disappeared in 2019

== J ==
- Tom Jackson – Métis actor, singer and entrepreneur
- Roy Jenson – actor
- Eric Johnson – actor
- Gilmore Junio – Olympic speedskater

== K ==
- Athena Karkanis – actor
- Aly Kassam-Remtulla – anthropologist, non-profit executive, vice provost at Princeton University
- Daryl Katz – chairman and chief executive officer of the Katz Group; owner of the Edmonton Oilers
- James Keelaghan – musician
- Parker Kelly – ice hockey player
- Jessica Parker Kennedy – actress
- Cassius Khan – Indian classical tabla player and ghazal singer, recipient of Salute to Excellence Award
- Kiesza – singer-songwriter, multi-instrumentalist and dancer
- Matt Kinch – ice hockey player
- Cathy King – curler, from St Albert
- Ralph Klein – mayor of Calgary and premier of Alberta
- Cody Ko – YouTuber
- Andrew Kooman – author and playwright
- Brent Kosolofski – boxer
- Myrna Kostash – writer of eight books, including All of Baba's Children
- Peyton Krebs – ice hockey player
- Krew – group of YouTuber siblings
- John Krizanc – playwright
- Chad Kroeger – lead singer and guitarist of Nickelback
- Ed Kucy – Canadian Football League player
- Brett Kulak – ice hockey player
- Norman Kwong – Canadian Football League player and lieutenant governor of Alberta

== L ==
- Stephanie Labbe – Olympic soccer player
- Patti LaBoucane-Benson – Métis academic and senator
- Morgan Lander – singer/songwriter
- Daymond Langkow – ice hockey player
- Danielle Lappage – Olympic wrestler
- Alvin Law – motivational speaker
- Tony Law – comedian
- Sheena Lawrick – Olympic softball player
- Raymond Lemieux – organic chemist
- Stewart Lemoine – playwright
- Evangeline Lilly – actress
- Jens Lindemann – trumpet soloist
- Trevor Linden – former professional hockey player, member of the Order of Canada, president of hockey operations for Vancouver Canucks and recipient of the Order of British Columbia
- Amanda Lindhout – journalist and humanitarian
- Bryan Little – ice hockey player
- Sam Livingston – Irish-born early settler in Calgary
- Rochelle Loewen – model who appeared briefly with WWE
- Paul Lorieau (1942–2013) – optician and national anthem singer for the Edmonton Oilers 1981–2011
- Peter Lougheed – Canadian Football League player and premier of Alberta
- Lowell – electropop musician
- Pierre Lueders – bobsledder
- Ed Lukowich – curler
- Corb Lund – country and western singer/songwriter
- Joffrey Lupul – ice hockey player

== M ==
- Don MacBeth – jockey
- Jason MacDonald – Ultimate Fighting Championship fighter
- Jinder Mahal – professional wrestler
- Cale Makar – professional hockey player
- Ernest Manning – former premier of Alberta
- Heather Marks – supermodel
- Kari Matchett – actor
- Bill Matheson – meteorologist
- Richard Matvichuk – National Hockey League player
- Wop May – pioneering aviator and bush pilot
- Ken McAuley – goaltender for the National Hockey League New York Rangers, husband of Mildred Warwick McAuley
- Frederick McCall – World War I fighter ace, businessman, stuntman
- Trent McClellan – comedian
- Nellie McClung – first woman appointed to the Board of Governors of the Canadian Broadcasting Corporation (1936), one of the Famous Five
- Don McCrimmon – politician
- Bruce McCulloch – actor, writer, comedian, and film director
- Todd McFarlane – creator of the Spawn series of comics
- Kevin McKenna – professional soccer player
- Sherry McKibben – politician
- Marshall McLuhan – recipient of numerous awards and appointments, pioneer of media theory
- Tate McRae – singer/songwriter, dancer, and voice actress
- Anne-Marie Mediwake – broadcaster
- Jordan Mein – mixed martial arts fighter
- Joseph Meli – four-time Canadian Olympian (judo)
- Mark Messier – National Hockey League player
- Barb Miller – politician
- Big Miller – jazz and blues singer
- Gord Miller – sportscaster
- Joni Mitchell – singer-songwriter and painter; born in Fort Macleod, but grew up in Saskatoon, Saskatchewan
- Carl Mokosak – National Hockey League player
- Cory Monteith – singer and actor; born in Calgary but grew up in Vancouver
- Cory Morgan – blogger, Alberta independence politician and activist, and columnist
- William (Billy) Morin – chief of Enoch Cree Nation
- Derek Morris – ice hockey player
- E. Roger Muir – creator of "Howdy Doody" TV show
- Emily Murphy – first female magistrate in British Empire and petitioned Supreme Court of Canada to allow women the vote; one of the Famous Five
- Ray Muzyka – co-founder of BioWare Corp.
- Curtis Myden – Olympic bronze medallist, swimming

== N ==
- Issey Nakajima-Farran – professional soccer player
- Jim Neidhart – professional wrestler
- Natalya Neidhart – professional wrestler
- Naheed Nenshi – mayor of Calgary
- Richard Newman – writer, broadcaster, and reality TV star, best known for participating in the seventh series of the British version of Big Brother
- Scott Nichol – ice hockey player
- Marjorie Nichols – journalist and writer
- Scott Niedermayer – ice hockey player
- Leslie Nielsen – film and television actor
- Amy Nixon – curler
- Rebecca Northan – actress

== O ==
- Susan O'Connor – curler
- Steven Ogg – actor, best known for his roles as Simon in The Walking Dead and Trevor Philips in Grand Theft Auto V
- Kevin Ogilvie – vocalist for the industrial band Skinny Puppy
- Peter Oldring – actor
- Bud Olson – former member of Parliament and senator for Medicine Hat, former lieutenant governor of Alberta
- Dan Olson – creator of the Folding Ideas YouTube channel
- Ben Ondrus – ice hockey player
- Melissa O'Neil – 2005 Canadian Idol winner
- Maren Ord – singer, songwriter
- Chris Osgood – former professional hockey player
- Kelly Oxford – writer, New York Times bestselling author of Everything Is Perfect When You're a Liar

== P ==
- Jean Paré – author of Company's Coming cookbooks
- Ryan Peake – rhythm guitarist of Nickelback
- Chris Pearson – 1st premier of Yukon
- Allen Pedersen – National Hockey League player
- Ron Pederson – stage and screen actor
- Nigel Pengelly – politician
- Jim Peplinski – former professional hockey player (Calgary Flames)
- Kelly Perlette – light middle-weight boxing gold medal at the 1978 Commonwealth Games
- P.J. Perry – jazz saxophonist
- Jordan Peterson – university professor
- Matt Pettinger – ice hockey player
- Michael Phair – politician and activist
- Dion Phaneuf – ice hockey player
- Chris Phillips – professional hockey player (Ottawa Senators)
- Rod Phillips – radio broadcaster for 630 CHED
- Annamay Pierse – swimmer born in Toronto and raised in Edmonton
- Gerry Pinder – professional hockey player
- Fernando Pisani – ice hockey player
- Justin Pogge – ice hockey player
- Pierre Poilievre (born 1979) – member of Parliament, leader of the Conservative Party of Canada and the leader of the Official Opposition
- John "Red" Pollard – jockey of the famous horse Seabiscuit
- Tara-Jean Popowich – winner of So You Think You Can Dance Canada (Season 2)
- Glenn Price – conductor
- Doug Pruden – multiple world records in push ups
- Purity Ring – electronic duo
- Al Purvis (1929–2009) – assistant captain of the Edmonton Mercurys
- Jamie Pushor – hockey player
- Mark Pysyk – ice hockey player for the Buffalo Sabres

== Q ==
- Quanteisha – singer
- Carl Quinn – singer-songwriter

== R ==
- Theo de Raadt – programmer, founder of OpenBSD and OpenSSH software projects
- Lobsang Rampa – Tibetan Lama
- Jan Randall – composer
- Duncan Regehr – actor
- Steve Regier – ice hockey player
- Alyssa Reid – singer/songwriter
- Steven Reinprecht – ice hockey player
- Chris Reitsma – professional baseball player
- Nick Ring – professional mixed martial arts fighter
- Douglas Roche – O.C., former M.P., senator, U.N. ambassador, nuclear disarmament figure, author, and journalist
- Steve Rodehutskors – Canadian football player
- Stacy Roest – hockey player
- Hey Romeo – country singer/songwriter
- Chava Rosenfarb – author and Holocaust survivor
- Matthew Rowley – ski jumper
- Mark Rypien – quarterback and most valuable player in Super Bowl XXVI
- Rick Rypien – former NHL player (Vancouver Canucks)

== S ==
- Jamie Salé – Olympic gold medallist skater
- Willie Saunders – Montana-born Hall of Fame jockey, won U.S. Triple Crown
- Mary Scott – visual artist
- Patrick Sharp – professional ice hockey player (Dallas Stars); born in Winnipeg, Manitoba, raised in Calgary and later Thunder Bay, Ontario and Burlington, Vermont
- Kyle Shewfelt – Olympic gold medallist
- Shiloh – singer/songwriter
- Keith Shologan – professional Canadian football player
- Barbara Sibbald – novelist and journalist
- Paula Simons – journalist and senator
- Rhonda Sing – professional wrestler
- Laurie Skreslet – first Canadian to climb Mount Everest
- Harry Smith – professional wrestler
- Jason Smith – retired professional ice hockey player
- Linda Smith – novelist
- Keegan Soehn – trampoline gymnast
- Monte Solberg – Conservative politician
- Ron Southern – businessman and founder of Spruce Meadows
- Donald H. Sparrow – businessman and Conservative politician
- Jay Sparrow – singer/songwriter
- Paul Spence – actor; portrays headbanger Dean Murdoch in FUBAR
- George Stanley – designer of the current Canadian flag
- Muriel Stanley Venne – Indigenous women's rights advocate
- Vic Stasiuk – hockey player
- David Stephan
- Stan Stephens – former governor of Montana
- Stereos – pop rock band
- Richard Stevenson – poet
- Catherine Mary Stewart – film and television actor
- Ryan Stock – TV circus stuntman
- Charlie Storwick – musician, actress in Some Assembly Required
- Jason Strudwick – ice hockey player
- Darryl Sydor – ice hockey player

== T ==
- Elle-Máijá Tailfeathers – Blackfoot and Sámi filmmaker, actor, and producer from the Kainai First Nation in Canada
- Theo Tams – winner of Canadian Idol Season 6 (2008)
- Barb Tarbox – anti-smoking activist
- Ari Taub – Olympic Greco-Roman wrestler
- Cora Taylor – author
- Ken Taylor – Canadian ambassador to Iran; helped six Americans escape from Iran during the Iran hostage crisis under operation nicknamed Canadian Caper
- Tegan and Sara – musicians
- Mark Tewksbury – Olympic gold medallist, swimming
- Robert Thirsk – astronaut
- Tenille Townes – singer
- Arnold Tremere – executive director of the Canadian International Grains Institute
- Adam Trupish – boxer
- Kreesha Turner – singer/songwriter

== V ==
- Shaun Van Allen – National Hockey League player
- Aritha Van Herk – writer, critic, editor, public intellectual, and university professor
- Alan Van Sprang – actor
- Pete Vandermeer – ice hockey player
- Chad VanGaalen – musician
- Greg Vavra – football player
- Mike Vernon – former professional National Hockey League player; won with the Calgary Flames in 1989
- Kris Versteeg – hockey player
- Doug Vogt – photojournalist
- Delwin Vriend – teacher and activist

== W ==
- Allan Wachowich – former chief justice of the Court of Queen's Bench of Alberta
- Jean Wallbridge – architect
- Cam Ward – professional ice hockey goaltender (Carolina Hurricanes); born in Saskatoon, Saskatchewan, but grew up in Edmonton
- Max Ward – aviator and founder of Wardair Airlines
- John Ware – pioneer rancher
- Dr. Lorne Warneke – activist, clinical psychiatrist, and founder of the Grey Nuns Community Hospital's gender clinic
- Cadence Weapon (Rollie Pemberton) – rapper
- Bronwen Webster – curler
- Crystal Webster – curler
- Kenneth Welsh – film and television actor
- Michael Wex – novelist and playwright
- Ray Whitney – retired professional ice hockey player; played 1991–2014
- TJ Wilson – professional wrestler
- David Winning – film and television director, Stargate: Atlantis, Andromeda, Syfy Channel movies

== Z ==
- Cole Zajanski – luge
- Alfie Zappacosta – singer, songwriter
- Greg Zeschuk – co-founder of BioWare Corp

== See also ==
- List of writers from Alberta
