= Dubuque (disambiguation) =

Dubuque is a city in Iowa, United States.

"Dubuque" may also refer to:

== Places ==
United States

- Dubuque County, Iowa
- Dubuque, Kansas
- East Dubuque, Illinois
- University of Dubuque
- Dubuque, Arkansas
- Kenneth Dubuque Memorial State Forest, Massachusetts

== Other ==
- Dubuque (surname)
- USS Dubuque
- Dubuque-class gunboats
