= Can Man Dan =

Canadian activist and philanthropist

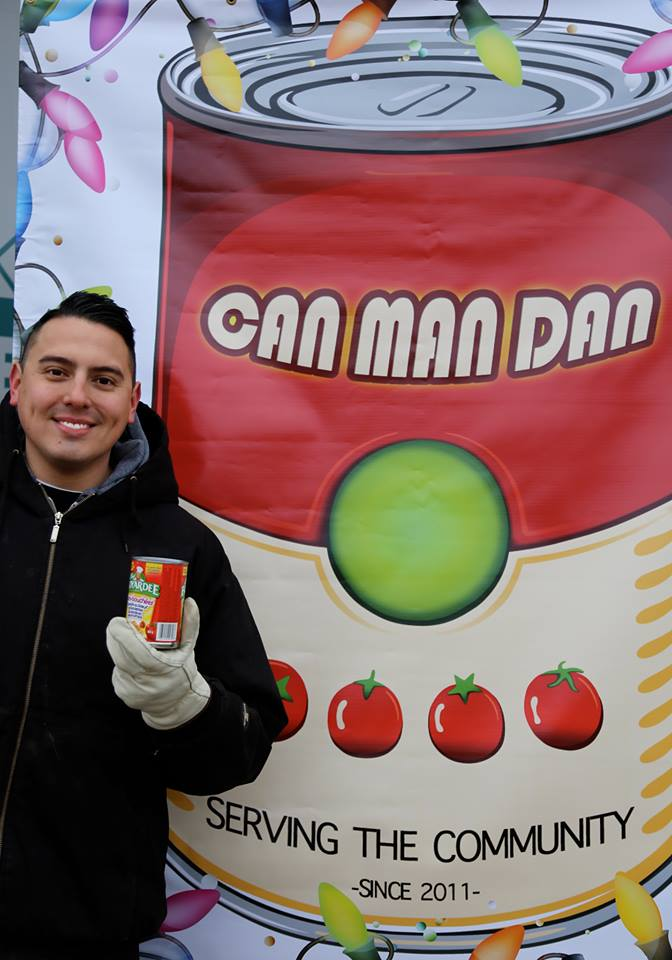
- Johnstone during a winter campout in 2016
- Born: July 31, 1987 (age 39); Edmonton, Alberta, Canada
- Education: MacEwan University
- Occupations: Activist, author
- Years active: 2011–present
- Website: www.canmandan.org

Daniel Lee Johnstone (born July 31, 1987), also known as "Can Man Dan," is a Canadian anti-poverty and social activist, philanthropist, and author. Alongside his non-profit organization, the Can Man Dan Foundation, Johnstone has worked with local community members, various levels of government, and other non-profit groups and charities to facilitate his charitable acts.

Growing up in a single-mother, low-income household, Johnstone was motivated to support the same services and community projects that his family had used and started the Can Man Dan initiative. Johnstone has stated that his ultimate goal is to "spread a positive message about helping people in need, raise awareness for different charities in need, and ultimately assist in the ending of hunger, poverty, and homelessness in Alberta by forming a united community."

On top of the community events that he hosts, Johnstone also travels to schools and events across western Canada as a motivational speaker to share his story and various experiences. His work also includes leading an inner city help program, where he and his group of volunteers distribute meals and supplies to Edmonton's homeless community every month. Johnstone has also advocated for other social issues and programs such as adequate protection and resources for domestic abuse victims, supporting LGBTQ rights and freedoms, initiating a basic income for Canadians, and defending and investing in social housing projects for seniors and low-income families.

== Early life ==
Johnstone was born in Edmonton, Alberta on July 31, 1987, during the notorious Edmonton tornado that claimed 27 lives, and he is the eldest son of Pamela Johnstone. Growing up in a single mother household along with his brother, they were often dependent on local charities such as the Christmas Bureau, the Adopt-A-Teen campaign, and the Edmonton Food Bank. After high school, Johnstone studied at MacEwan University for a year before leaving after his mother fell ill.

== Charity work ==
Johnstone's activism and philanthropy work began in Edmonton in the June 2011, when he began going door-to-door around various neighbourhoods by himself collecting food and clothing donations for various charities, such as the Edmonton Food Bank, the youth shelter, and various homeless shelters and soup kitchens. In June 2021, Johnstone announced that his 10 years of fundraising and activism as "Can Man Dan" has raised $4.4 million for people in need across Alberta.

=== Annual events ===
While Johnstone hosts many community events around Alberta, he is perhaps best known for his annual Christmas campaign, where every December, Johnstone camps out for weeks in the back of a tractor-trailer, aiming to fill it with food and toy donations for children and families in need. Due to the severity of the winters commonly found in Alberta, and the freezing cold temperatures that go along with them, these campouts have become highly publicized and staple events for many charities and other grassroots programs. Can Man Dan's holiday campaign has raised millions of dollars in funding and resources for various charities and people in need across Alberta. Johnstone has also hosted many other charitable events around Alberta, including his annual "We're Here For Ya Day" event, where he offers free hair services, a barbecue meals, personal hygiene products, school supplies, fresh bread, and food hampers to thousands of low-income individuals.

=== Notable charitable acts ===
In June 2013 Can Man Dan provided immediate assistance to Calgary's Food Bank and those affected by the 2013 Alberta floods in the form of 5000 pounds of food. In both December 2013 and December 2014, local Edmonton chain restaurant, Delux Burger Bar, featured Can Man Dan as their "Celebrity Chef." Delux Burger Bar locations across Edmonton added the Can Man Dan burger to their menus, and gave a portion of sales to the Edmonton Food Bank on Dan's behalf. Dan also arranged to have the Can Man Dan burger served to hundreds of Edmonton's homeless & less fortunate as he hosted "Burger Night" at one of Edmonton's local homeless shelters. Johnstone made headlines in April 2014 after he announced that he would wrestle in a professional wrestling match with Canadian wrestling promotion, the PWA (The Prairie Wrestling Alliance) to raise money, food and awareness for Edmonton's homeless youth population. Despite suffering a fractured nose during the bout, Johnstone ultimately won his debut wrestling match raising thousands of dollars and thousands of pounds of food for Edmonton's Youth Empowerment and Support Services (YESS), an organization that Dan's mother had used when she was a teenager. In the spring of 2015, Johnstone started a new community project aimed to help struggling locally owned businesses attain new customers called "Localive".

In the summer of 2015, Johnstone was voted in by Edmonton's general public to serve as an honorary parade marshal for their annual K-Days festival parade. Johnstone, along with five other community heroes and various departments of Edmonton's first responders, were made honorary parade marshals and each given $2500 to donate to a charity of their choice. In November 2015, a press release was issued announcing that Johnstone was made honorary chairman and official ambassador for Edmonton's Adopt-A-Teen program, a social program that Dan and his family used when he was growing up. Since being made Adopt-A-Teen's honorary chairman in 2015, Johnstone has helped provide thousands of low-income and underprivileged teenagers with a $50 gift card for Christmas. Johnstone made national headlines in December 2015 as he announced that he would spend the month touring Alberta and camping out in various cities to raise resources for multiple food banks across the province affected by the economic downturn. Johnstone's "Tour of Alberta" raised 25 tonnes of food and thousands of dollars for various food banks throughout Alberta to distribute to people in need. In May 2016, Johnstone revealed that he and his mother were former victims of domestic abuse and that he was starting a thirty-five-day campaign to raise awareness for domestic abuse victims and raise money for a local women's shelter (WIN House) in Edmonton. Johnstone's campaign consisted of completing six "extreme and wacky" stunts around Edmonton, which were intended to raise awareness and money. Johnstone's stunts included wrestling in a professional wrestling match against Ring Of Honor's Silas Young, becoming an Edmonton Eskimos cheerleader for a day, and undergoing intense police training with Edmonton Police Services, among other things.

In December 2016, Johnstone embarked on his "Feed Alberta Tour" hoping to raise food and funds for various food banks across Alberta that were hit hard due to the ongoing recession. Johnstone travelled to the cities that were most affected by the stagnant economy and camped out in freezing cold temperatures for several days on end. Johnstone's "Feed Alberta Tour" raised more than 50 000 pounds of food and close to $20 000 in cash donations. One month after its initial release in December 2016, Dan personally paid for forty low-income single parents and their children to watch Rogue One in theatres. Dan cited that Star Wars was one of his favorite movie franchises and he believed that all children should have the opportunity to watch it. In March 2017, Dan publicly urged Edmonton's city council to use a $38 million snow-removal surplus on renovating and restoring Edmonton's low-income housing units. In May 2017, Can Man Dan took 55 students from a local Catholic elementary school to Edmonton's inner-city streets to pass out hundreds of care packages filled with food, personal hygiene products, and socks to the city's homeless and most vulnerable. In November 2017, Dan announced that he was hosting the "Can Man Dan City-Wide Food Drive" to replenish Edmonton's struggling local food bank, which was seeing record high usage at the time. Dan put out a plea to Edmonton residents and Edmonton's city council to help him "refill all of the empty shelves" at the Edmonton Food Bank and to work together to ensure that "no one goes hungry" over the holiday season. Dan's citywide food drive managed to raise over 110 000 pounds of food and $65 000 in 30 days.

After the death of Colten Boushie, Dan was just one of many aboriginal leaders to publicly condemn the not-guilty verdict. In March 2018, Can Man Dan was able to raise more than $10 000 for an Edmonton-based centre for low-income, homeless, and forgotten seniors. In September 2018, Johnstone was able to equip 2 100 low-income children in the Edmonton region with school supplies, backpacks, food hampers, haircuts, and breakfast supplies before the 2018/2019 school semester started. In December of that year, Johnstone announced that he would be hosting the "Can Man Dan City-Wide Food and Toy Drive" in support of various Edmonton charities and declared that "no child in his city will go without a gift to open or a hot meal to eat on Christmas day". Dan's city-wide drive was a big success and managed to bring in more than 60 000 pounds of food for Edmonton's Food Bank, which was severely struggling at the time, and nearly $60 000 worth of brand new toys for Santas Anonymous, an Edmonton-based charity that provides wrapped gifts to underprivileged children every year.

==== Launch of the Can Man Dan Foundation ====
On September 1, 2019, Johnstone equipped thousands of low-income children and their families with free school supplies and backpacks for the upcoming public school year. That same day, Johnstone also held a major press conference to unveil his brand new not-for-profit organization, the Can Man Dan Foundation. In October 2019, Johnstone, along with his newly created foundation, provided hundreds of Edmonton's low-income and at-risk youth with brand new Halloween costumes and accessories. Due to the decline in Alberta's economy, Can Man Dan ensured youth that they would be provided for and that they would still be able to partake in the Halloween festivities. In November 2019, Can Man Dan announced that he would be completing four, four-day winter campouts leading up to Christmas citing that "every child deserves a hot meal on their plate and a gift to open up on Christmas Day." Johnstone's series of winter campouts managed to raise 75 000 pounds of non-perishable food and frozen turkeys for Edmonton's local food bank, as well as $75 000 worth of brand-new toys for underprivileged children.

==== Work during the COVID-19 pandemic ====
In March 2020, during the COVID-19 pandemic, Can Man Dan handed out hundreds of "COVID-19 Emergency Packages" directly to Edmonton's homeless population as a way to help curb the spread of the disease among those considered most vulnerable. Each emergency package roughly contained thirty dollars (CAD) worth of essential personal hygiene products and non-perishable food items as there were widespread shortages of both at the time.

On August 30, 2020, Johnstone, along with the Can Man Dan Foundation, supplied two thousand low-income children living in the greater Edmonton Metropolitan Region with free backpacks filled with school supplies, food hampers, haircut vouchers, personal hygiene products, and face masks for the upcoming school season. Can Man Dan noted that he didn't necessarily agree with the decision of the Government of Alberta to send children back to school during the ongoing COVID-19 pandemic, but still felt the need to support impoverished children regardless of his personal opinion. In the days leading up to Halloween in 2020, Can Man Dan outfitted two-hundred disadvantaged children in Edmonton with brand-new Halloween costumes and outfits, giving them the opportunity to partake in the annual tradition. Johnstone noted that he felt obligated to help after there was a large plea from families who were suffering financially from the dormant economy caused by the COVID-19 pandemic. On November 19, 2020, Can Man Dan began his tenth annual holiday food and toy drive to support Edmonton's local food bank and other Christmas-themed charities found in the city. This was Johnstone's tenth consecutive year of camping out in freezing temperatures to raise support and donations for underprivileged families and children in need. Can Man Dan noted that "COVID cannot take Christmas" and vowed to raise as much non-perishable food items and brand new toys as he possibly could within a five-week period. Can Man Dan ended his annual food and toy drive by raising over 60,000 pounds of food for Edmonton's Food Bank, and $130,000 (CAD) in new toys for local non-profit organizations.

==== Break and return to philanthropy ====
In August 2021, Johnstone announced that he would be leaving public life after succumbing to occupational burnout, and an array of other mental and physical health issues. In the fall of 2022, Johnstone returned to his philanthropy and public life by opening a new "faith and wellness" centre in Edmonton, Alberta, which also happened to coincide with the release of his debut book, "...I Think God is Real: The Extraordinary Journey of Can Man Dan". Johnstone spoke candidly with various media outlets documenting his long and private struggles with depression, alcoholism, burnout, and suicidal ideation—which he all claimed stemmed from his own personal unresolved childhood trauma. Johnstone also noted that he found faith in his time away, along with a newfound respect for therapy and psychiatry, and would now devote his career and life to helping others find the same value in these life changing services. Johnstone ended off 2022 by camping out in −36-degree temperatures for four days straight to raise donations for Edmonton's local food bank, which was seeing unprecedented usage at the time. Johnstone also used this opportunity to advocate for people experiencing mental health issues during the holiday season.

In April 2025, Johnstone expressed his frustration with the City of Edmonton's lack of action to help alleviate homelessness and extreme poverty, calling for systemic change and political accountability.

In December 2025, in his 15th year of charitable winter campouts collecting toys and food for underprivileged children, Johnstone collected over 60,000 pounds of food donations for Edmonton's Food Bank and approximately $50,000 of new toys for 880 CHED's Santas Anonymous. This led into early 2026, when Johnstone took on a corporate role with Sobeys to help combat food insecurity in Edmonton; however, this partnership only lasted a little over a week due to differences in ideas between Sobeys Corporate and Johnstone. On April 1, 2026, Johnstone, under his Can Man Dan moniker, awarded the City of Edmonton and Province of Alberta a self-assessed "C-" and "F" grade, respectively, during a one-man protest held outside Edmonton's City Hall, to address each level of government's response to escalating homelessness issues.

In late September 2026, Johnstone made news when he urged Edmonton City Council to amend their public spaces bylaw, stating it criminalizes poverty and is inherently "anti-poor." He claimed the bylaw unfairly targets homeless and Aboriginal individuals, and that taxpayer dollars are better spent creating safe shelter spaces to keep up with the rising population of Edmonton's unhoused.

== Political career ==
In June 2013, Dan Johnstone announced that he would be running in the 2013 Edmonton municipal election. Johnstone declared that he would be running for the open seat in Edmonton's Ward 10 which was vacated by Mayoral hopeful, Don Iveson. Johnstone, declaring himself as fiscally responsible and socially progressive, was the youngest candidate running for any position in the 2013 Edmonton election, being only 25 years old when he announced his candidacy. Johnstone's platform was largely based on the repair of basic infrastructure, spending responsibly, focusing on the revitalization of mature neighbourhoods, investing in the building of low income housing, as well as building a stronger public transit system while lowering fares. Johnstone also pledged to self-fund his entire campaign and donate $10 000 for each year of his terms' salary to various charities and causes around Edmonton citing that, "politicians make entirely too much money." He was ultimately defeated by former Alberta Party candidate, Michael Walters.

On December 27, 2015, Johnstone announced his candidacy for the Ward 12 by-election race in Edmonton's south-side district to replace Amarjeet Sohi who was elected to Justin Trudeau's Liberal government in October 2015. Johnstone, once again labelling himself as a fiscally responsible and socially progressive candidate, concentrated on restructuring Edmonton's photo radar system and redirecting a majority of the revenue to Edmonton's Police services, ushering in a more economical public transit system, postponing the building of the Valley Line LRT route, and mandating that a certain percentage of newly developed land must contain low-income and other forms of social housing. Johnstone was also openly critical of the record-breaking thirty-two candidates citing that it would confuse casual voters and result in a low voter turnout. Johnstone was defeated by local police detective, Moe Banga.

In May 2018, Johnstone announced that he was seeking the Alberta Party nomination to be their official candidate in the upcoming 2019 Alberta general election. Johnstone was looking to represent the Alberta Party in the province's Edmonton-South district, but left near the end of June 2018, citing lack of "leadership, direction, and organization;" he also noted that while he respected former Edmonton mayor, Stephen Mandel, he was still unpersuaded and preferred the leadership of former Alberta Party leader, Greg Clark.

On January 22, 2021, Dan announced his candidacy for the newly created Ward Ipiihkoohkanipiaohtsi in the 2021 Edmonton municipal election. He withdrew his candidacy in August 2021, citing a need to focus on his mental health.

== Awards and honours ==
In June 2015, "WO Magazine" listed Johnstone as one of their "Top 5 Anti-Poverty Activists". Johnstone was voted by readers as Edmonton's "Best Activist" in Vue Weekly's "Best of Edmonton 2017" series, and was voted Edmonton's "Best Philanthropist" in the 2018 edition. In November 2018, Avenue Magazine awarded Dan with their "Top 40 Under 40" award for "[donating] his time to give back to the community.

== Personal life ==
Dan is an avid professional wrestling fan, a self-declared cinephile, and board game enthusiast. Dan has noted on several occasions that his favourite television show is Game of Thrones, and that he is also a fan of reality television, and one day hopes to compete on Survivor, Big Brother Canada, and The Amazing Race Canada. Dan considers himself to be a political independent, but believes that all levels of government should take a more centrist approach when governing, as he believes that divisive and polarizing politics are harmful to a society and the community.
