= Sibbald (disambiguation) =

Sibbald may refer to:

== Places ==
- Sibbald is a hamlet in Alberta, Canada
- Cape Sibbald, a cliffed cape by Lady Newnes Bay in Antarctica

== People ==
- Sibbald (surname)
