= Sibbald (surname) =

Sibbald is a surname of Scottish origin. It was first used by the descendants of Dominus Sylbaldus. Notable people with the surname include:

- Barbara Sibbald (born 1958), Canadian novelist and freelance journalist
- Bobby Sibbald (born 1948), English footballer
- Craig Sibbald (born 1995), Scottish footballer
- Sir John Sibbald (1833–1905) Scottish physician
- Robert Sibbald (1641–1722), Scottish physician and antiquary
