= Dubuque (surname) =

Dubuque is a surname. Notable people with the surname include:

- Alexandre Dubuque (1812–1898), French-Russian composer
- Bill Dubuque, American screenwriter
- Chuck Dubuque (1932–2020), Canadian football player
- Gene Dubuque (1927–1974), American wrestler
- Joe Dubuque (born 1982), American wrestler
- Julien Dubuque (1762–1810), French-Canadian, arrived near what is now Dubuque, Iowa
