= Dubuque, Arkansas =

Former village in Arkansas, United States

- Location within Arkansas
- 36°28′48″N 92°55′0″W
- Location: Boone County, Arkansas

History
- Founded: 1814 (212 years ago)

Dubuque, Arkansas, originally known as Sugarloaf Prairie, was a town on the White River during the 19th century. White settlement began in 1814, and the town grew until the American Civil War. Dubuque's location at a river crossing and the presence of nearby lead mines drew attention to it during the war, and the town was destroyed during the fighting. Some postwar rebuilding efforts occurred, but it had mostly ceased to exist by 1870. The former location of Dubuque is now beneath Bull Shoals Lake.

== History ==
The area along the White River that became Dubuque was inhabited by the Osage, who hunted there. White settlement began in 1814, when one James Coker moved to the area, which was originally known as Sugarloaf Prairie. The settlement was located near where West Sugar Loaf Creek flowed into the White River. By 1818, Henry Schoolcraft reported that four families had settled there. Six years later, a flood on the White River inundated the area. In 1832, a road was built from the town to the riverbank, using slaves. Eventually, roads ran to the community from Yellville, Arkansas, and Springfield, Missouri. The settlement was along the weekly mail route between Forsyth and Yellville. In 1837, a post office under the name of Mound Prairie was established in the community, but lasted less than half a year. The town developed during the 1840s, and another post office, under the name of Worth, was established in 1848.

In 1849, logs were hauled from Omaha, Arkansas, to build a combined church and school at the community. Two years later, a steamboat had traveled up the White River, but found the river ceased to be navigable above Sugarloaf Prairie. The steamboat's captain was asked to provide a new name for the settlement, and he chose the name Dubuque, as he was from Dubuque, Iowa. A post office under the name of Dubuque opened in 1854. The county sheriff was murdered near Dubuque in 1855, and in 1859 the first lead smelter in the region was established at Dubuque. The community had multiple stores, a blacksmith, two doctors, and a gristmill, and became known for horse racing.

Dubuque's location at a crossing of the White River drew attention to the settlement in the American Civil War, as well as the lead mines in the area. Union militia forces raided into Dubuque from Ozark, Missouri, on November 8, 1862, after the Battle of Clark's Mill. Commanded by Captain Milton Burch, the soldiers entered the town, captured a Confederate prisoner and killed a Confederate surgeon and the local postmaster, although rumors claimed that an entire family and two other men had been killed as well. The Confederates operated a niter works at Dubuque, although it was destroyed by the 10th Illinois Cavalry Regiment on November 26. Confederate general John S. Marmaduke camped his forces there in early 1863, during the leadup to Marmaduke's First Expedition into Missouri. Confederate forces led by Joseph O. Shelby fought against Union troops later in 1863 at Dubuque, and guerrilla fighting occurred there as well. The town was destroyed during the war.

Some residents of Dubuque returned after the war to rebuild, but most either never returned or gave up. Boone County, Arkansas, was established in 1869, and Dubuque fell within the new boundaries; previously it had been part of Marion County. By 1870, the town had largely ceased to exist and it was no longer identified in land transactions after that year, although the river landing and a ferry continued to operate. The steamboat Lady Boone was built at the old town site in 1880. The ferry continued to operate until the 1940s, when it was closed down by the construction of Bull Shoals Dam. Dubuque's former location is now beneath Bull Shoals Lake, 5 miles (8.0 km) north of Lead Hill.

== Sources ==
- Huddleston, Duane; Rose, Sammie Cantrell; Wood, Pat Taylor (1998) [1995]. Steamboats and Ferries on the White River: A Heritage Revisited. Fayetteville, Arkansas: University of Arkansas Press. ISBN 1-55728-538-1.
- Ingenthron, Elmo (1980). Borderland Rebellion: A History of the Civil War on the Missouri–Arkansas Border. Forsyth, Missouri: The Ozarks Mountaineer. OCLC 7157026.
- Johnston, James J. (2000). "Bullets for Johnny Reb: Confederate Nitre and Mining Bureau in Arkansas". In Bailey, Anne J.; Sutherland, Daniel E. (eds.). Civil War Arkansas: Beyond Battles and Leaders. Fayetteville, Arkansas: University of Arkansas. pp. 47–84. ISBN 1-55728-565-9.
