= David Stephan =

Canadian business executive

- Citizenship: Canadian
- Occupation: Employee of Truehope Nutritional Support
- Known for: Being charged with failing to provide the necessaries of life for his son, Ezekiel, speaker at wellness expos, advocacy of alternative medicine
- Spouse: Collet Stephan
- Children: 4
- Parent(s): Deborah and Anthony Stephan

David Stephan is an executive at a Canadian food supplement company. He and his wife Collet were convicted of failing to provide the necessaries of life in April 2016 after the death of their son Ezekiel who was 19 months old. After winning an appeal, the Stephans were found not guilty. This verdict was subsequently overturned and a third trial ordered. In 2021 the Crown decided to stay the proceedings.

The Stephans embraced pseudoscientific ideas including alternative medicine, anti-vaccine theories and COVID-19 conspiracy theories.

== Family and early life ==
David is one of ten children born of Deborah and Anthony Stephan. He grew up in Southern Alberta in a Mormon family.

Deborah had had bipolar affective disorder for close to a decade when she died by suicide in 1994 at the age of 40. After Deborah's death, the family, who belong to a Latter Day Saint group that believes in a naturalistic healing approach, became vocal advocates and believers in alternative medicine.

== Ezekiel ==
Ezekiel was born at home on August 20, 2010.

Starting on February 27, 2012, Ezekiel became ill with what his parents described as flu-like symptoms. The parents used herbal remedies, including homemade smoothies containing hot pepper, ginger root, horseradish, onion, other alternative therapies and a religious blessing.

On March 13, the Stephans took Ezekiel to Lethbridge to purchase remedies but, according to the prosecutor, Britta Kristensen, he was so stiff that he was placed in a mattress in the back of the car instead of his car seat. That evening, Ezekiel stopped breathing prompting the family to initiate CPR and call emergency services, meeting the paramedics on the way to Cardston hospital to save time. The paramedics found no pulse or neurological activity. Ezekiel was air lifted to Alberta Children's Hospital in Calgary. When Ezekiel was examined, doctors discovered that he had had seizures and had very little brain activity. Court documents state that days prior to being taken to the hospital, Ezekiel was given fluids via an eyedropper because he had stopped eating and drinking. The parents also treated their son with EMPowerplus, a supplement sold by Truehope Nutritional Support, a company that David works for.

Ezekiel died a week after being admitted to the children's hospital, on March 16, 2012, from bacterial meningitis. He was 19 months old.

At autopsy, Ezekiel was found to have pus on his brain and in the pleural cavity around the lungs, which were indicators of HiB infection, a disease that Ezekiel had not been vaccinated against.

According to Science Based Medicine writer David Gorski, "Neck stiffness is a sign of meningitis, and neck and spine stiffness so bad that the parents couldn’t put Ezekiel into his car seat should be an incredibly worrisome sign to parents that the child is very sick."

== Court cases ==
=== First trial ===
The first court case received media attention in Canada and internationally, being followed closely by proponents and opponents of alternative treatments.

Prosecutor Lisa Weich claimed that not seeking medical attention for Ezekiel equated to abuse. She stated that the Stephans loved their son but that love, in this case was not enough. She said, "Parents still have to follow a standard of care as set by criminal law."

The Crown prosecutors focused on a three-day period from March 10 to 13, 2012, when Collet called Lexie Vataman, a receptionist for a naturopathic doctor that the family used in Lethbridge. Vataman testified that she recommended the family go to a medical doctor, or to emergency because she suspected meningitis. She also testified that on March 13, three days later, Collet came in to pick up echinacea, an herbal remedy for Ezekiel. Terrie Shaw, a midwife and nurse, who in 2012 was helping Collet prepare for a home birth, testified at the trial that when she was called to the house on March 12, Ezekiel was sleeping and breathing easily, but she advised Collet to seek a medical opinion after searching meningitis online with her. They discussed herbal and alternative remedies and the possibility of having a priesthood blessing performed. Shaw described Collet as a competent and loving mother.

During the trial, the Stephans testified that they thought Ezekiel had the flu or croup.

The Crown argued that the parents, though they loved their son and were caring parents, did not follow a legal standard of care, however, the defence argued that the couple did not recognize how sick their son really was.

In June, 2016, a jury found the Stephans guilty of failing to provide the necessaries of life. After the guilty verdict, David wrote an open letter on Facebook to the jury stating, "I only wish that you could’ve seen how you were being played by the Crown’s deception, drama and trickery that not only led to our key witnesses being muzzled, but has also now led to a dangerous precedent being set in Canada." He expressed concern that this case could be seen as an opportunity for government's monitoring how people parent, giving rise to the possibility of more criminal prosecutions.

The Crown had asked for a three to four-and-a-half year sentence. Justice Rodney Jerke sentenced David Stephan (then aged 33) to four months jail and Collet (then aged 36) to three months of house arrest, allowing for trips for medical appointments and church. Each was sentenced to two years’ probation and 240 hours of community service to be completed by 2018. Collet was also ordered to post a copy of the sentencing decision to personal websites and social media accounts. The judge ordered that the Stephans' three children must see a medical doctor at least once a year and see a public health nurse every three months.

The difference in the two sentences was explained by Jerke. While Collet called a nurse about her son's illness, David got nutritional supplements and called his father, Anthony Stephan, to give Ezekiel a blessing. While Jerke stated that he believed the parents were caring and did not intend to put their son's life at risk, he was critical of David's apparent lack of remorse and his refusal to admit that his actions had impact with regard to his son's death.

Many of the Stephans' family and supporters, wearing white shirts to show their support of the couple, attended the sentencing. Advocates of the Stephans made a fundraising website called Stand 4 Truth that had daily updates about the trial.

Research director of the Health Law Institute at the University of Alberta, Timothy Caulfield, expressed concern that the continued statements from David about his family being targeted because they didn't vaccinate their children could make them martyrs for the alternative medicine and anti-vaccination movement.

In July 2016, the Crown filed a notice of appeal to the Court of Appeal in Calgary because they deemed the sentences to not be "...proportionate to the gravity of the offense or to the degree of responsibility of the offender, and is unfit."

In November, 2017 the Alberta Court of Appeal upheld the conviction. The decision was not unanimous which allowed the Stephans to appeal to the Supreme Court of Canada.

=== Supreme Court decision ===
The Supreme Court of Canada overturned the verdict, declaring that the original trial judge did not provide the jury with the tools necessary to make a decision given the large amount of medical evidence offered during the trial. The court also stated that the judge made comments that showed bias. After the victory, the Stephans fired their legal team stating they could not afford further legal fees. The couple attempted to be reimbursed for four million dollars in legal fees but the application was denied. In 2019, The Stephans represented themselves with two lawyers stepping in from time to time. David has publicly been critical of the justice system and the media.

=== Second trial ===
After the Supreme Court decision, a second trial without a jury was held in 2019, presided over by Queen's Bench Justice Terry Clackson. The Stephans were acquitted. The Crown asked the province's top court to overturn the acquittals because, in part, they felt that the judge's comments about Nigerian born medical examiner Dr. Bamidele Adeagbo's manner of speaking during the trial to be offensive and insulting showing possible bias. The judge called Adeagbo's testimony difficult to understand because of his accent, leading legal and medical experts to file a complaint against Clackson with the Canadian Judicial Council, calling for a racism investigation. Defence attorney, Jason Demers countered stating the Judge was patient and fair, only addressing Adeagbo's speech mannerisms because David Stephan had brought them up. Demers claimed that Adeagbo gave long winded answers, paced back and forth and was volatile, being asked on multiple occasions to calm down.

"[Dr. Bamidele Adeagbo's] ability to articulate his thoughts in an understandable fashion was severely compromised by: his garbled enunciation; his failure to use appropriate endings for plurals and past tenses; his failure to use the appropriate definite and indefinite articles; his repeated emphasis of the wrong syllables; dropping his Hs; mispronouncing his vowels; and the speed of his responses,"

— Justice Terry Clackson, CBC

“It is inappropriate to disparage witnesses for their pattern of speech, accents or less than perfect command of one of Canada’s official languages. Or of any language for that matter,”

— Chief Justice Catherine Fraser, Global News

The prosecution also asked for the acquittal since they felt that the judge had made an error to make the Crown prove that timely treatments would have saved Ezekiel's life. During the trial, the defence asserted that Ezekiel did not have meningitis. Dr. Anny Sauvageau testified for the defence that Ezekiel died from lack of oxygen in the ambulance, while Adeagbo testified that he died from meningitis, which he said was treatable. The Stephans and their defence argued that it was the lack of child-sized supplies in the ambulance causing the paramedics to improperly intubate the toddler that caused the boy's death. The prosecution countered that when the parents got Ezekiel to the paramedics, he had stopped breathing for 11 minutes.

Gorski criticized the judge's statement about Adeagbo's failing to look for another possible cause of Ezekiel's death since the symptoms of pus on the brain and in the pleural cavity clearly indicate that the meningitis was bacterial. He further criticizes Clackson's dismissal of the incriminating things the Stephans said to police and ambulance attendants, claiming that the Stephans were under stress. Clackson agreed with the defence that Ezekiel died from oxygen deprivation because of the lack of proper equipment in the ambulance. Gorski countered that having the correct equipment would not have made any difference because of how sick Ezekiel was. He asserted that Clarkson's verdict was not based on science, believing the testimony of Sauvageau, who Gorski viewed as unqualified since she was not licensed at the time of the trial and did not have a background in forensic pathology. Her previous certifications had been in Quebec as an Anotomo-Pathologist.

At both trials, the Stephans stated that they had thought that their son had the flu or croup and had treated him with remedies that included "...a smoothie with tinctures of garlic, onion and horseradish."

=== Third trial ordered ===
In March 2021, the Alberta Appeal Court ordered a third trial against the Stephans, setting aside the not guilty verdicts, ruling that the judge's comments about Adeagbo showed a bias, and that Clackson had erred requiring the Crown to prove that medical intervention would have saved Ezekiel's life. The Court of Appeal notes that Sauvageau shared many of the same speech characteristics, including talking with a strong accent, talking quickly and using medical jargon yet her speech issues were not mentioned by Clackson. The appeal judges also notes that Clackson had allowed David Stephan, who was representing himself, to question Adeagbo for four days alleging that the doctor was biased against them in his autopsy report because the Stephans had not vaccinated Ezekiel. In a text to the Canadian Press, David responded to the decision by stating he felt the court system was corrupt.

In April 2021, defence attorney Demers filed an application to the Alberta Court of Appeal to ask for a stay of proceedings so they can request an appeal to Canada's highest court.

In June 2021, crown prosecutors stayed the charges against the Stephans determining that the evidence did not meet standards for prosecution since it had been 9 years since Ezekiel's death and that the available evidence had deteriorated, making a reasonable likelihood of conviction unlikely. Senior prosecutors, including those with an expertise in child protection reviewed the case before a decision was made.

The Stephans and their lawyer, Shawn Buckley expressed surprise that the decision was made prior to hearing the results of their application for leave to appeal to the Supreme Court of Canada. The team plan to still pursue the application to seek clarification of the law for parents. The Stephans expressed a desire to seek repayment of court fees.

On August 4, 2022, the Supreme Court of Canada decided to not hear the appeal for the case, ending the possibility of further legal proceedings. The Stephans expressed disappointment in the decision.

== Reactions ==
Supporters of the Stephans argue that the parents did nothing wrong, calling for an ambulance when things suddenly got worse. Some people have blamed the Canadian system because the ambulance was delayed, causing the Stephans to drive to meet them and then finding that the ambulance did not have the proper intubation equipment.

Critics of the Stephans note how long they waited to call for help, noting that Ezekiel was so stiff that he could not be put into his car seat, suggesting that the Stephans waited longer than a typical parent would wait.

Assistant professor at Yale University School of Medicine, Steven Novella, blames governments like Canada's that license naturopaths as legitimate medical sources and the alternative medicine community that the Stephans were an active part of.

A Facebook page called "Prayers for Ezekiel" was filled with acrimony with some asking for the death penalty for the Stephans and others decrying the guilty verdict as a "travesty of justice."

After the second trial acquittal, Gorski expressed his concern that the Stephans would now be heroes in the alternative medicine movement in Canada and around the world for being "“falsely accused” of child neglect, being “persecuted” by the system, and finally having beaten the charges and found to be “innocent”." He worries that when parents invoke their parental rights, the rights of children can be ignored. He sees this as an example of child abuse when he states, "Not to take him for medical evaluation and to opt for treating him with witchcraft was child abuse at its most naked, in my not-so-humble opinion."

== Family business ==
David's father, Anthony Stephan co-founded, with David Hardy, Truehope Nutritional Support in 1996, which operates out of Raymond, Alberta. Anthony started the company after his wife committed suicide and after apparently curing two of his children who were diagnosed with bipolar affective disorder with a cocktail of supplements he created. This cocktail became EMPowerplus which, along with other supplements, they claim help depression, schizophrenia, bi-polar disorder, ADHD, autism and anxiety.

In 2000, the company had funding from the Alberta government for a two-year study on the benefits of EMPowerplus but Health Canada did not approve the trial since EMPowerplus was not an approved drug. This sparked an investigation into the product, with the federal government raiding the TrueHope offices and stopping shipments of supplements at the U.S. border. Eventually, in 2006 an Alberta court cleared the company of all charges after health Canada's rules changed with regards to supplements. However, in both 2003 and 2007, Health Canada issued warnings that there was no evidence that the supplement was safe and expressed concerns that unauthorized health claims were being made.

In an email to the National Post in 2016, the company shared that EMPowerplus had been studied in four counties by 45 researchers and results appeared in 30 medical journals. According to James McCormack, professor of pharmaceutical sciences at the University of British Columbia, many of the studies were case or cohort studies with small sample sizes. Some had a sample size of only one individual. Many were not blinded so the participants knew what they were taking and the few double blinded studies with larger sample sizes had not been replicated. As of 2016, EMPowerplus was shipped to more than 100 countries.

Health Canada has reported 14 adverse reactions from EMPowerplus that result from withdrawing from prescribed psychiatric medications, which TrueHope advises. In 2011, Jordan Ramsay killed his father after switching from his medication for schizophrenia to EMPowerplus.

In 2010 it was reported that the company's revenue was $10.9 million, with David having a personal income over $500,000 per year.

In 2011, Stephan and Hardy split the company over differences in the direction the company would go. Hardy accused the Stephans of selling a new EMPowerplus supplement that was supposed to be as effective as the original at half the dose but was really the same as the original formulation.

As of 2018, David was employed as the company's director of marketing.

Anthony claimed that the charges against David and Collet were brought about in response to the Canadian government's failed attempts to shut the company down. He asserted that "big pharma" was upset about losing profits to his family's supplements and had interfered with their attempts at raising funds for David and Collet's trials. Anthony accused the Canadian Broadcast Corporation (CBC) of being "out to get them." He claims that people committed suicide when the Royal Canadian Mounted Police confiscated EMPowerplus.

== Anti-vaccination ==
None of the Stephans children were vaccinated. David indicated that he had heard so many stories about vaccines causing autism from parents that he and Collet decided it was best not to vaccinate their children. After the death of Ezekiel and just before the first trial began David reinforced his decision to not vaccinate stating, "We're actually more adamant than we ever were."

The anti-vaccination publication Health Impact News had stated that the Canadian government was using the Stephans' case as a deterrent for families who chose not to vaccinate their children, hoping to frighten them. The Stephans supported this concern in an interview with The Canadian Press and on Facebook where they stated they were being "offered up on the sacrificial alter [sic?] of the vaccine industry." David also believed the charges were brought against them because of his family starting a supplement company.

Anti-vaccination activists Del Bigtree and Polly Tommey, producers of the controversial film Vaxxed, interviewed the Stephans for a YouTube video in 2016. In the interview, David claimed that deciding if a child should be vaccinated is a parental rights issue and deciding not to vaccinate should not make a parent liable. In the video, Bigtree and Tommey asked the public to support the couple financially.

== Views on COVID-19 ==
On social media, David has stated that COVID-19 is a hoax that was brought about to bring on "fancy new vaccines" and that the seriousness of the illness has been "falsely inflated." He claimed that rights were being taken away and that the economy was being intentionally caused to crash.

== Speaking at health expos ==
In 2018, David was set to speak at a number of health and wellness expos in Edmonton, Calgary and Winnipeg including as a keynote speaker at the Health and Wellness Expo in Saskatoon. When he spoke at the Winnipeg event the previous year David brought in large crowds, speaking three times. In a Facebook post David claimed that he had given 30 public presentations in 13 months. Rick Thiessen, who runs the Health and Wellness Expos, stated he started getting hate mail from around the world regarding David speaking at the events. Thiessen cancelled David and any involvement of Truehope after the Saskatoon event sponsors Sobeys, the second largest food retailer in Canada, and Flaman Fitness withdrew because David was to be a speaker. Thiessen, who had run the expos for 24 years as of 2018, had not shied away from inviting controversial speakers and had previously stated that David's conviction was separate from the products he was selling.

Promoter of the Body Soul & Spirit Expo in Calgary, Alberta, Chandler Armstrong, chose not to remove David as a speaker since the event did not rely on sponsors. David posted on his Facebook page that he would be discussing brain and thyroid health and "how to avoid dangerous psychiatric medications while achieving a far greater quality of life."

David spoke in Olds, Alberta in March 2018 at Health Street Wellness despite a social media backlash. Rick Kohut, the president of Health Street Wellness stated that he believed most of the backlash came from "pharma-trolls" who were hired by the industry to tarnish holistic health.

David alleges that his public appearances are pushing back against the medical establishment.

== Personal life ==
After Ezekiel's death, the family moved from Glenwood, Alberta to Nelson, British Columbia. As of 2019, the family have four living children.
