= USS Dubuque =

Two ships of the United States Navy have been named USS Dubuque, after the city of Dubuque, Iowa.

- USS Dubuque (PG-17) was a gunboat first commissioned in 1905 and seeing periodic service until 1945.
- USS Dubuque (LPD-8) was an Austin-class amphibious transport dock, commissioned in 1967 and decommissioned in 2011.
