= Diane Loranger =

Canadian geologist and paleobotanist

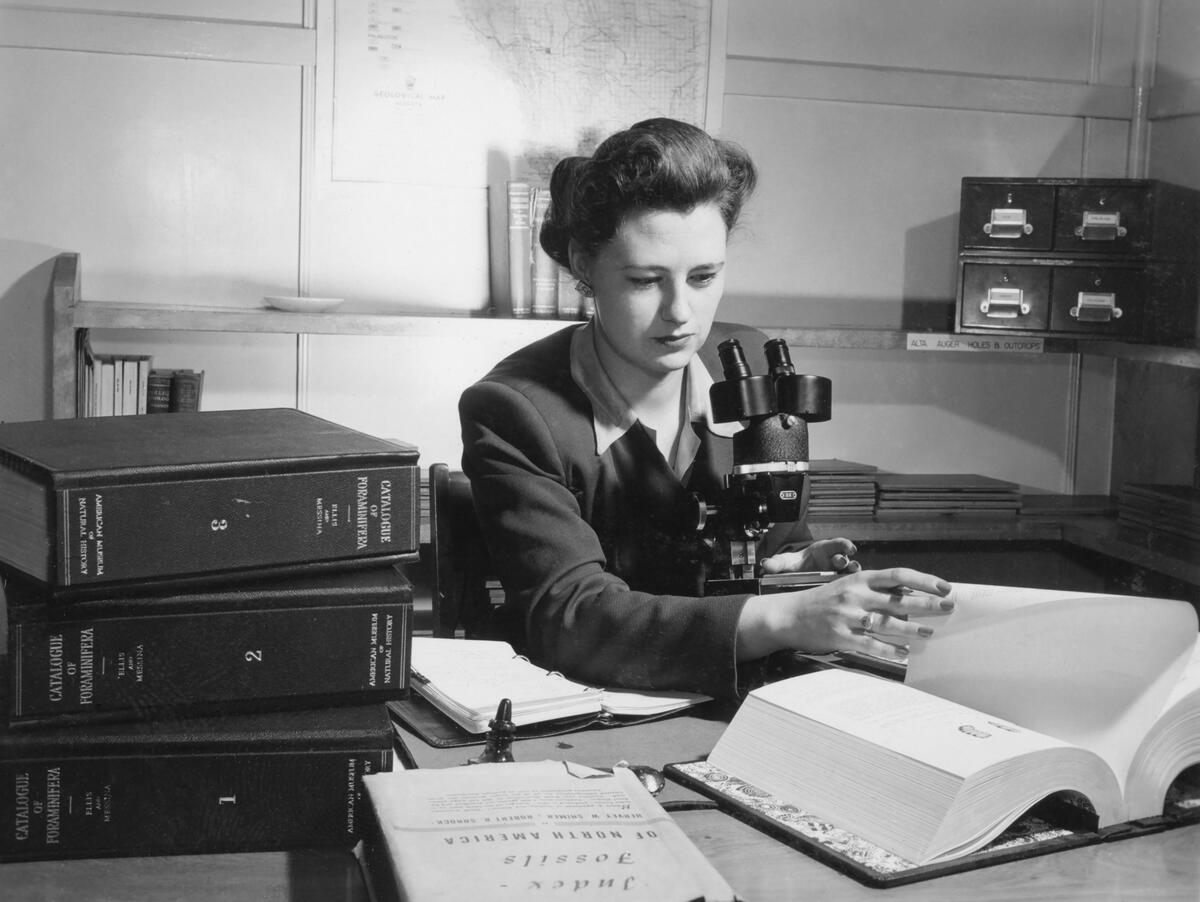
- Geologist Diane Loranger, [ca. 1946-1947]
- Born: Diane Loranger; 1920; Edmonton, Alberta
- Died: 2004 (aged 83–84)
- Other name: "Madam Curious"
- Education: University of Manitoba; University of London
- Known for: A pioneer in the petroleum industry
- Scientific career
- Fields: Geology; Micropaleontology; Paleobotany; Paleoecology

Diane May Lally Loranger, B.Sc, F.G.S., Ph.D., D.I.C., (1920–2004) was a Canadian geologist, paleontologist, and pioneer in the global petroleum industry. Her career began working with Imperial Oil in Calgary in the 1940s. She is widely regarded as the first female geologist to break through the barriers of the male-dominated field of geology in Western Canada. Diane Loranger earned her Bachelors of Science in Geology at the University of Manitoba, and graduated with a doctorate in 1961 from the University of London. Her work in micropaleontology was paramount to the understanding and locating of Western Canadian oil reserves at the beginning of the Western Canadian oil boom.

She was the first woman from Red Lake, Ontario to earn a PhD. Loranger lectured all over the world, and published numerous papers. Growing up in Red Lake, she lived around nature and was passionate about the environment and geology. She worked as an oil field consultant from 1961 into the 1970s. Loranger learned how to code on computers in 1971 and used this skill to make a digital record of her work in paleoecology.

== Career ==
=== Imperial Oil ===
After graduating from the University of Manitoba in 1943 with a Bachelors of Science in Geology - one of the first women to do so - Loranger began her career with Imperial Oil in Calgary. The job would usually involve log stay in remote camps and most company owners would not allow women to do geological work back then, though for some unclear reasons, Loranger was actually sent on trips from the start. A subsidy of Standard Oil, Imperial Oil's work in the province of Alberta would discover the Leduc Woodbend Devonian oil reef in 1947 - the same year Loranger would be promoted from resident/field geologist to a senior supervisory position at Imperial's sub-surface laboratory. One important finding her work uncovered was the loss of ornamentation on fossil ostracods as the depth of their burial increased. Loranger's innovative method of using microfossils to date sedimentary deposits was used to locate the Leduc Formation.

Her work on biostratigraphy in Western Canadian oil reserves gained her international recognition in both the oil and geologic sectors. Loranger would go on to form her own paleontological consulting service, travelling to more than 50 countries for both work and the sake of adventure.

In 1961, Loranger earned a Ph.D. in Geology from the University of London, making her the first woman from her home town of Red Lake to earn a post doctorate degree. In 1962, Loranger added to her accomplishments by earning a D.I.C. from the Imperial College of Science & Technology, Royal School of Mines, London.

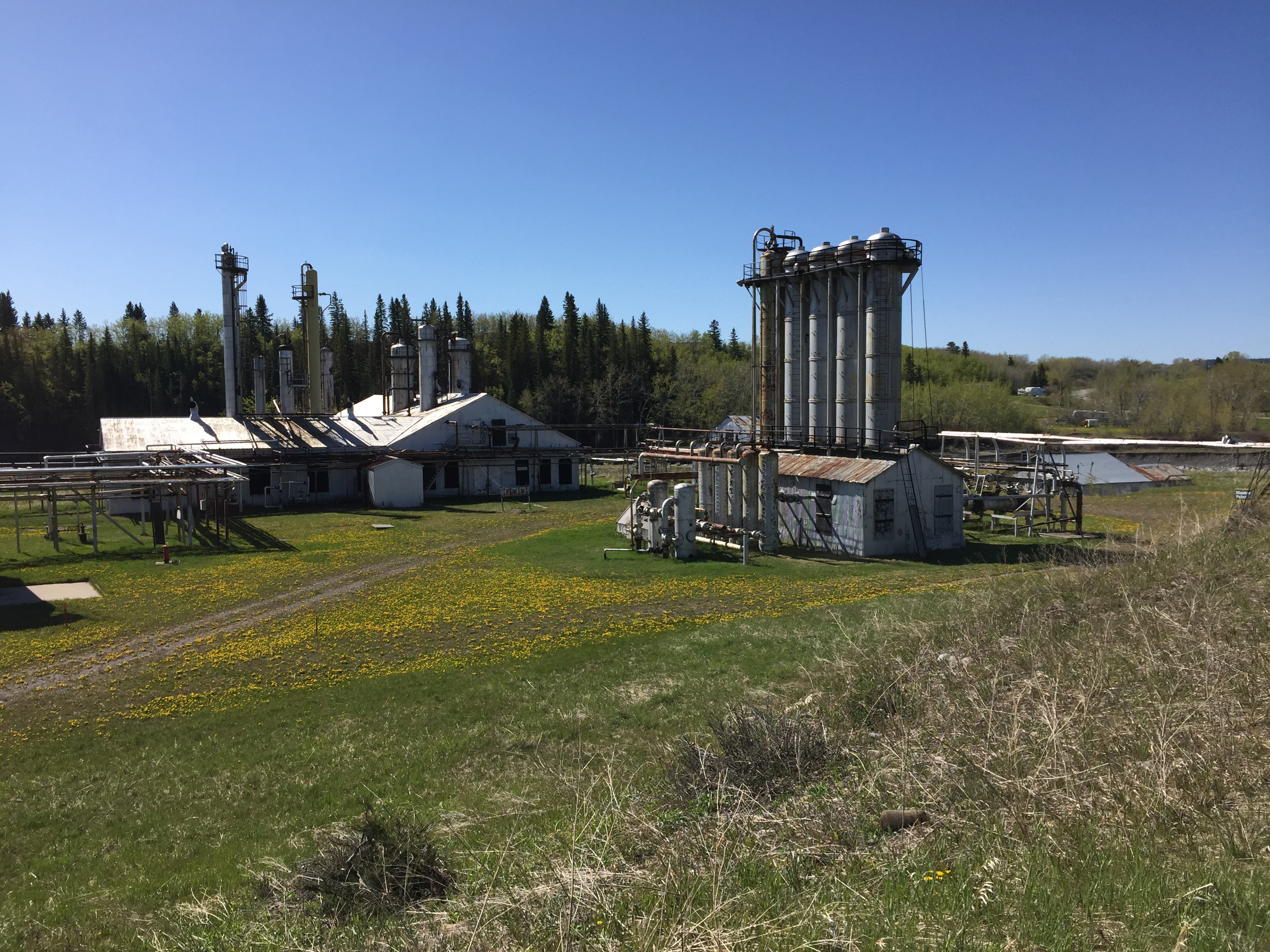
Turner Valley Gas Plant where she worked studying samples.

=== Turner Valley Gas Plant ===
Loranger played a significant role in the Turner Valley Gas Plant and quickly rose to a supervisory position. She worked with core samples by studying them under a microscope. This was done to examine the rock sediments for trace minerals, reservoir properties and to collect porosity and perm data that are not found in logs. Existing equipment was adapted to apply new technologies to efficiently and effectively transport petroleum products.

== Contributions to geology ==
Loranger performed extensive exploration and development in the field of stratigraphy and biostratigraphy in Alberta. Her time working at Imperial Oil was largely spent analyzing, dating and locating ostracod microfossils as a tool to predict and locate oil and other hydrocarbon deposits. Through coring, drilling and assessing 39 well locations across a large majority of Alberta, she made strong correlation of ostracod layer thicknesses and depths at Imperial Oil Leduc No. 1 and Foothills well No. 26. This significant correlation between these two sites and several other lead Loranger to the conclusion that the ostracod layer was a relatively consistent and widespread tool for further correlation to aid in locating additional hydrocarbon deposits across south-central Alberta.

Loranger made additional significant correlation between the western Alberta geosyncline and the more northeastern, Canadian Precambrian Shield. Although sedimentation patterns at both locations shared few similarities, Loranger made correlation through the use of biostratigraphy techniques. She used the Balantoides Fribourgellus Zone and the Macronotella Biltmorensa Zone as these ancient marine reef fauna locations have low variation, and high quality preservation. The Balantoides Fribourgellus Zone and Macronotella Biltmorensa Zone were both rich in ostracod species and various other microfossils. Loranger made correlation due to findings of the same species of ostracod in both locations which were known to have existed in the Mississippian period. This would prove to be useful, as by comprehending the geology of the two areas, it would imply the general geological description of the whole province and as such these fossils had provided great insight in age determination and facies study for Alberta.

Loranger also worked with Brown and Wright about a research regarding on the Precambrian stratigraphy, a section of Lake Athabasca shore, how it consist of "mostly flat lying with initial dips of up to 10 degrees, due to deposition of sandstone, conglomerate, and arkoses on an uneven floor". Precambrian rocks underlies in the Northeastern Alberta, emerges in the extreme northeastern part of the province and acts as the Canadian shield. They described Athabasca as "the series lies with pronounced angular unconformity on older Pre Cambrian rocks", the early Proterozoic rocks are folded and consist of intrusions, deeply eroded, conglomerates, sandstones, shales, and some dolomites. It's all laid down on the erosional surface which forms the Athabasca series.

== Personal life ==
Diane Loranger was born in Edmonton, Alberta, 1920. The daughter of master carpenter, Bruno "Bill" Loranger, and an English born dancer and competitive swimmer, Daisy Loranger, the family moved to Hudson, Ontario in 1927 during the Gold Rush era. Diane’s mother, Daisy Loranger was born in London, England. "Madam Curious” as her father called her, lived an adventurous life, flying her own plane and fixing her own cars. She was also a dancer in her youth, who worked for the Shakespearean Theatre Company and performed for the King and Queen. Daisy was also an accomplished medal-winning swimmer, and owned her own dress boutique.

“Many of my memories are auditory—loons calling, the full moon nights when the sound of Ojibway drums from across the lake coaxed the spirits to give them blessings for the coming winter season, howling of wolves when the snow was crisp underfoot and shadows were purple under the trees. I appreciated nature in all seasons and aspects and although I had the urge to worship at the altar of logic (geo-logic), I’ve never forgotten the land. I remember the winter hikes, hockey games and skating on the rinks (even at -40 degrees F), the quest (with the help of my one-dog Eskimo sleigh) for the perfect Christmas tree, the prolonged break-ups and freeze-ups, the great ball games we played on the less-than-regulation field with its 10’ drop at the far end, the re-enactment of the 1937 coronation (costumes were thanks to our mothers’ ingenuity) and the long, lazy summers when we swam, played tennis, ball and used the canoes to great advantage.”

Diane's adolescence in Red Lake piqued her interest in the natural sciences, athletics, and flying. She was a member of Red Lake's first Girl Guide troop from 1936 to 1937. By 1938, Red Lake had earned the title of the World's Busiest Airport due to the extensive mining in the area, and Diane's community continued to change as she became Red Lake's first high school graduate. Before leaving Red Lake, Diane joined the Junior Birdmen of America. Her passion for flying grew stronger as she grew older, and she received her commercial pilot's license, which she used to fly to remote geological job sites. Loranger enrolled at the University of Manitoba and went to work for Imperial Oil after graduating. Then by 1947, she had risen to a senior supervisory position with the company. A woman of many firsts, Diane had achieved immense success in the face of a male-dominated industry that had a stigma against women geologists, believing they would need 'special comforts' in the field. As a field geologist weighing 125 lbs, she regularly walked upwards 14 miles a day with full gear in the often intense Alberta summers. Her passion for science and creativity in her field belied the industry's reputation, and the nickname "Madam Curious," often propelled her over the next hill.

“I stocked tadpoles which I systematically rendered unconscious with alcohol and then dissected to see how they ticked. The terrible smells and explosions in my chemistry lab caused my Dad to call me “Madam Curious”. He was very supportive, though and let me follow my star which is all one can hope for.”

Diane's adult hobbies stemmed from her upbringing in Red Lake. She built a remote cabin, serving as an escape into nature, and her relentless spirit took matters into its own hands when her second hand car struggled to start. Instead of taking the car to a mechanic, Diane enrolled in mechanics courses and handled maintenance herself.

Even after retirement Diane Loranger stayed active, especially through her support of disadvantaged women in her community. She regularly volunteered and in a span of just 3 years she donated over 8 tons of clothes and furniture to disadvantaged mothers. Loranger also filled her time leading delegations to city hall on issues surrounding elder and disabled access in the community and participated in the Big Sister community. Diane died at the age of 83 in the city of Calgary, Alberta.

== Education ==
Diane’s family moved to Hudson, Ontario where she began her elementary school. The Loranger family eventually relocated to Red Lake where she attended the Red Lake High School and became the first to graduate in. Until 1938, she enrolled at the University of Manitoba to pursue a Bachelor of Science in Geology and completed it in 1943. Four years later, she rose to receive the position of senior supervisory with Imperial Oil. Although it wasn’t easy, Loranger received quite a slander for being a woman and was told that petroleum Geology was not a woman’s field at the time. But this of course didn’t stop her from doing what she loves and earned her title of being the first woman to work in the oil fields of Western Canada in 1947. Later on, after years of working as an Oilfield consultant, Loranger decided to pursue a Ph. D in Geology from the University of London in 1962 where she became the first person to earn a Ph. D from Red Lake. But she didn’t stop there, Loranger then also fulfilled her childhood dream of being a pilot and received a commercial pilot license that allowed her to fly to remote geological sites.

=== Diana Loranger Memorial Scholarship ===
This scholarship is offered to students who are enrolled their second or third year at the University of Manitoba majoring in the field of geological sciences. To be eligible for the scholarship, students must be enrolled at the University of Manitoba as a full-time student. To receive this scholarship, the selected student must have excelled in this program and have a high GPA. The minimum GPA required to receive this memorial scholarship is a 3.5. The Diane Loranger Memorial Scholarship is worth $4175 and is awarded to one individual and is a non renewable scholarship, meaning it is a one-time payment.

== Publications ==
Diane Loranger published many articles, including journal articles and academic papers. Partial list:

- Loranger, D.M. (1951): Useful Blairmore Microfossil Zone in Central and Southern Alberta, Canada; Bull. Amer. Assoc. Pet. Geol., Vol 35, No. 11, pp. 2–348-67.
- Guide Book Eighth Annual Field Conference Nordegg, 1958. Pages 29–38.
- The Cretaceous/Jurassic Contact in West Central Alberta. D. M. Loranger.
- Mississippian Microfaunas- Their Stratigraphic and Paleographic Significance: ABSTRACT. Diane M. Loranger, 1956.
- Jurassic Paleobiography of Western Canada Basin: ABSTRACT. Diane M. Loranger, 1956.
- Ireton Microfossil Zones of Central and Northeastern Alberta: Stratigraphy. ABSTRACT. D.M. Loranger, 1954.
