= Company's Coming =

Series of cookbooks

- Author: Jean Paré
- Country: Canada
- Language: English
- Genre: Cookbooks
- Publisher: Company's Coming Publishing Limited

Company's Coming is a popular line of cookbooks that has sold over 30 million copies since 1981. The series is produced by Company's Coming Publishing Limited based in British Columbia, and distributed from Edmonton, Alberta. The series was written by Jean Paré.

Founded in 1981, the Company's Coming series comprises over 200 cookbooks, each on a single subject.

In 2009, Company's Coming Editor Laurie Stempfle wrote Gold: Small Plates for Sharing which received the Canadian Culinary Gold award in the Cookbook category.

== Author ==
Paré started as a caterer. In 1981, at the age of 54, she self-published her first cookbook, printing 15,000 copies of 150 Delicious Squares. The book was sold in specially designed racks at gas stations, grocery stores and at local fairs. This first book started the Company's Coming company. Paré died on December 24, 2022, at the age of 95.

== Recipes ==
During the late 80s, Paré asked a local Morinville, Alberta resident, Jeannette Bachand, for some recipes to include in an upcoming cookbook. The first of Bachand's recipes were published in 1989 after Bachand called Company's Coming for a specific recipe for green tomatoes. There were no recipes for such a thing and was called by Paré for some recipes. When Dinners of the World was being written for release in 1991, Pare asked Bachand for French Canadian recipes. Four of the recipes are featured in the book, but her name is not due to the company's style.

== List of cookbooks ==
This is a list of cookbooks in order of series then alphabetized. Updated October 2024

=== Original Series ===
1. 100 Recipes from 100 Books (Mar/14)
2. 150 Delicious Squares (Apr/81)
3. 30-Minute Diabetic Cooking (Oct/08)
4. 30-Minute Pantry (Feb/10)
5. 30-Minute Rookie Cook (Sep/07)
6. 30-Minute Weekday Meals (May/05)
7. 4-Ingredient Recipes (May/06)
8. 5-Ingredient Slow Cooker Recipes (Oct/09)
9. Adding Vegetables to Everyday Meals (Sep/12)
10. Air Frying Made Simple (Aug/21)
11. Anytime Casseroles (Feb/11)
12. Appetizers & Snacks (Oct/12)
13. Appetizers (May/85)
14. Appliance Cooking (Mar/01)
15. Asian Cooking (Mar/02, Apr/11)
16. Barbecues (Apr/91)
17. Breads (Aug/96, Jan/11)
18. Breakfasts & Brunches (Apr/98)
19. Breakfasts On the Go (Jul/13)
20. Cake Favourites (Dec/20)
21. Cakes (Sep/90)
22. Casseroles (Jun/82)
23. Catch Of The Day (Apr/09)
24. Chicken Now (May/07)
25. Chicken, Etc. (Apr/95)
26. Chinese Cooking (Aug/03)
27. Choosing Sides (May/08)
28. Cook For Kids (Jul/01)
29. Cookies (Apr/88, Mar/23)
30. Cooking For Two (Sep/97)
31. Delicious Desserts (Mar/12)
32. Desserts (Apr/86)
33. Diabetic Cooking (Apr/07)
34. Diabetic Dinners (Oct/09)
35. Dinners of the World (Sep/91)
36. Easy Healthy Recipes (Jan/10)
37. Easy Home Preserving (Jul/13)
38. Entertaining for the Holidays (Oct/11)
39. Everyday Barbecuing (Apr/10)
40. Everyday Italian (Dec/11)
41. Fish & Seafood (Apr/96)
42. Fondues (Nov/01)
43. Garden Greens (May/03)
44. Ground Beef Recipes (Feb/06)
45. Healthy In A Hurry (Jan/09)
46. Healthy Recipe Makeovers (Dec/11)
47. Healthy Slow Cooker (Nov/10)
48. Herbs & Spices (Aug/04)
49. Holiday Entertaining (Sep/87)
50. Instant One-Pot Cooking (Nov/18)
51. Jean Paré's 'Favorites' (Sep/88)
52. Kids Cooking (Aug/95)
53. Kids Do Baking (Jul/09)
54. Kids Do Snacks (Jul/07)
55. Kids' Healthy Cooking (Jul/06)
56. Kids' Lunches (Aug/12)
57. Light Casseroles (Sep/94)
58. Light Recipes (Apr/93)
59. Low-Fat Cooking (Feb/01)
60. Low-Fat Express (Mar/08)
61. Low-Fat Pasta (Feb/01)
62. Lunches (Apr/92)
63. Main Courses (Sep/89)
64. Make Ahead Lunches for Kids (Aug/21)
65. Make-ahead Kids Lunches (Aug/20)
66. Make-Ahead Meals (Sep/00)
67. Meal Salads (May/10)
68. Meatless Cooking (Apr/97)
69. Mexican Made Easy (Apr/14)
70. Microwave Cooking (Sep/93)
71. Mostly Muffins (Sep/06)
72. Muffins & More (Jul/83)
73. New Make-Ahead Meals (Jan/13)
74. One-Dish Meals (Aug/99)
75. Pasta (Apr/90)
76. Perfect Pasta And Sauces (Aug/08)
77. Pies (Sep/92)
78. Pizza! (Apr/99)
79. Plant-based Cooking for Everyone (Sep/21)
80. Potato Favourites (Mar/19)
81. Potluck Dishes (Sep/05)
82. Preserves (Apr/94)
83. Pressure Cooking for the Instant One Pot (Nov/19)
84. Recipes For Leftovers (Feb/04)
85. Rush-Hour Recipes (Sep/02)
86. Salads (Jun/84)
87. School Days Lunches (Jul/05)
88. School Days Party Pack (Jul/04)
89. Simple Suppers (Feb/07)
90. Slow Cooker Dinners (Feb/05)
91. Slow Cooker Favourites (Feb/19)
92. Slow Cooker Recipes (Sep/98)
93. Soup Favourites (May/21)
94. Soup Favourites (Sep/20)
95. Soups & Sandwiches (Apr/87)
96. Soups (Oct/06)
97. Starters (Nov/99)
98. Stews, Chilies & Chowders (Oct/01)
99. Stir-Fry (Mar/00)
100. Sweet Cravings (Nov/02)
101. Table For Two (Feb/09)
102. The Beef Book (Feb/02)
103. The Beverage Book (Oct/04)
104. The Cheese Book (May/02)
105. The Egg Book (May/04)
106. The Pork Book (Sep/03)
107. The Potato Book (Nov/00)
108. The Rookie Cook (Jul/02)
109. Vegetables (Apr/89)
110. Vegetarian (Feb/13)
111. Whole Grain Recipes (Apr/11)
112. Year-Round Grilling (Mar/03)

=== Focus Series ===
1. Apple Appeal (Oct/07)
2. Avocado Accents (May/14)
3. Berries & Cream (Apr/09)
4. Better with Bacon (Nov/13)
5. Blender Drinks (May/14)
6. Blueberry Bliss (May18)
7. Burger Bravado (Mar/12)
8. Carrot Craze (Oct/09)
9. Charming Cupcakes (Nov/12)
10. Chicken Breast Finesse (Apr/08)
11. Chilled Thrills (Apr/08)
12. Chocolate Squared (Apr/08)
13. Christmas Cookies (Nov/12)
14. Classic Curry (Mar/13)
15. Coffee Cake Classics (Oct/09)
16. Cookie Jar Classics (Oct/07)
17. Cooking With Beer (May/14)
18. Cooking With Wine (Jun/17)
19. Cranberry Cravings (Oct/07)
20. Dip, Dunk & Dab (Oct/07)
21. Easy Roasting (Oct/09)
22. Eggceptional Eggs (Mar/13)
23. Fab Finger Food (Oct/07)
24. First Nations Recipes (Nov/14)
25. Fruit Squared (Mar/10)
26. Glorious Garlic (Mar/12)
27. Going Bananas (Mar/13)
28. Hearty Soups (Oct/07)
29. Hot Bites (Oct/09)
30. In A Nutshell (Nov/12)
31. Lemon Lime Zingers (Apr/09)
32. Meat Marinades (May/14)
33. Mushroom Magic (Mar/10)
34. Pepper Power (Mar/12)
35. Perfectly Pork (Mar/13)
36. Pizza Pizzazz (Nov/13)
37. Rib-tickling Ribs (Apr/15)
38. Salads To Go (Mar/10)
39. Say Cheese (Nov/13)
40. Scoops (Mar/12)
41. Sensational Salmon (Apr/17)
42. Shrimp Delicious (Apr/08)
43. Simmering Stews (Oct/08)
44. Simply Vegetarian (Oct/08)
45. Sips (Oct/07)
46. Skewered (Apr/09)
47. So Strawberry (Apr/08)
48. Splendid Spuds (Oct/08)
49. Squashed (Nov/12)
50. Steak Sizzle (Apr/08)
51. Sweet Dreams (Oct/07)
52. That's a Wrap (Mar/10)
53. Tomato Temptations (Apr/08)
54. Tossed (Apr/08)
55. Turkey Time (Nov/13)
56. Warm Desserts (Oct/08)
57. Zucchini Zone (Apr/09)

=== Canada Cooks ===
1. The British Columbia Cookbook (May/12)
2. The Canadian Barbecue Cookbook (May/12)
3. The Canadian Berry Cookbook (Aug/16)
4. The Canadian Cowboy Cookbook (Jun/16)
5. Canadian Culinary Olympic Chefs Cook at Home (Jun/12)
6. The Canadian Garden Cookbook (Jun/14)
7. The Canadian Harvest Cookbook (Sep/14)
8. Canadian Heritage Breads (Mar/16)
9. The Canadian Prairie Cookbook (May/12)
10. Celebrating 150 Years of Canadian Cuisine (Jun/17)
11. Italian With A Twist (Nov/14)
12. The Ontario Cookbook (May/12)

=== Essential Series ===
1. The Company's Coming Essential Slow Cooker (Sep/13)
2. The Essential Company's Coming Chicken (Jan/14)
3. The Essential Guys' Cookbook (May/14)

=== Greatest Hits Series ===
1. Biscuits, Muffins & Loaves (Apr/99)
2. Dips, Spreads & Dressings (Apr/99)
3. Italian (May/01)
4. Mexican (May/01)
5. Sandwiches & Wraps (Apr/00)
6. Soups & Salads (Apr/00)

=== Healthy Cooking Series ===
1. 400-Calorie Mains (Jan/15)
2. 400-Calorie Slow Cooker (Feb/16)
3. Complete Quinoa (Feb/14)
4. Gluten-free Baking (Jun/12)
5. Gluten-free Cooking (May/13)
6. Gluten Free for Kids (Sep/16)
7. Healthy Family Recipes (Jan/13)
8. Healthy Home Cooking: For Busy Families (Jan/17)
9. Superfoods Cookbook (Jun/12)
10. Superfoods Juicing & Smoothies (Jul/16)

=== Kids in the Kitchen ===
1. After-School Snacks (Aug/00)
2. Bag Lunches (Aug/00)
3. Kid's Cook 3-in-1 (Jul/10)
4. Kids Cook! Bonus Pack (Jan/04)
5. Kids Only! Snacks (Aug/97)
6. Kids Snack 'n' Bake (Jul/11)
7. Let's Make Cookies (Jan/23)
8. Lunches (Jul/98)
9. Weekend Treats (Aug/00)

=== Lifestyle Series ===
1. Diabetic Cooking (Mar/01)
2. Diabetic Dinners (Mar/04)
3. Easy Healthy Recipes (Aug/05)
4. Great Grilling for Friends & Family (Apr/15)
5. Grilling (Feb/00)
6. Healthy in a Hurry (Mar/07)
7. Heart-Friendly Cooking (Feb/03)
8. Low-Carb Recipes (Mar/05)
9. Low-Fat Cooking (May/98)
10. Low-Fat Pasta (Feb/99)
11. Whole Grain Recipes (Aug/07)

=== Most Loved Recipe Collection ===
1. Most Loved Appetizers (Nov/03)
2. Most Loved Barbecuing (Apr/05)
3. Most Loved Brunches (May/09)
4. Most Loved Casseroles (Nov/06)
5. Most Loved Cookies (Nov/05)
6. Most Loved Festive Baking (Nov/08)
7. Most Loved Holiday Favourites (Nov/07)
8. Most Loved Main Courses (Apr/04)
9. Most Loved Pies (Aug/09)
10. Most Loved Salads & Dressings (Mar/06)
11. Most Loved Slow Cooker Creations (Feb/08)
12. Most Loved Soups (Oct/11)
13. Most Loved Stir-Fries (Apr/07)
14. Most Loved Summertime Desserts (Apr/08)
15. Most Loved Treats (Nov/04)

=== Pint Size Series ===
1. Baking Delights (Nov/94)
2. Beverages (Oct/97)
3. Buffets (May/93)
4. Chocolate (Oct/95)
5. Finger Food (May/93)
6. Party Planning (May/93)

=== Practical Gourmet ===
1. 400-Calorie Slow Cooker (Feb/16)
2. Appetizers for Entertaining (Oct/16)
3. Beef Favourites (Jun/21)
4. Campfire Cooking (Jul/17)
5. Good Friends, Great Grilling (Mar/09)
6. Ground Beef Favourites (Oct/24)
7. Inviting Asian Flavours (Oct/09)
8. Main Course Favourites (Sep/17)
9. Parties & Potluck Entertaining (Oct/17)
10. Small Plates for Sharing (Sept/08)
11. Smokin' Eh (Jun/16)
12. Summer Entertaining (May/16)

=== Special Occasion Series ===
1. All-Occasion Gifts from Your Kitchen (Sept/09)
2. Baking—Simple to Sensational (Sep/04)
3. Celebrating the Harvest (Sept/11)
4. Chocolate Everything (Oct/00)
5. Christmas Celebrations (Oct/06)
6. Christmas Comfort & Joy (Oct/12)
7. Christmas Gifts From the Kitchen (Oct/05)
8. Company's Coming-Tonight! (Oct/08)
9. Company's Coming For Christmas (Oct/96)
10. Cooking at Home (Oct/07)
11. Cooking For the Seasons (Apr/02)
12. Decadent Desserts (Oct/03)
13. Easy Entertaining (Oct/98)
14. Gifts From the Kitchen (Sep/01)
15. Home for the Holidays (Oct/02)
16. Millennium Edition (Sep/99)
17. Timeless Recipes for All Occasions (Apr/06)
18. Weekend Cooking (Apr/03)

=== Wild Canada Series ===
1. Canadian Fishing Cookbook (Jun/13)
2. Canadian Outdoor Cookbook (Jun/13)
3. Canadian Wild Game Cookbook (Sep/14)

=== Assorted Titles ===
1. 30-Minute Meals (Feb/98)
2. Beans & Rice (May/97)
3. Beef Today! (Feb/97)
4. The Canadian Food Encyclopedia (Oct/13)
5. Family Table (Sep/97)
6. Ground Beef (May/97)
7. Make-Ahead Salads (Feb/98)
8. No-Bake Desserts (Feb/98)
9. Sauces & Marinades (May/97)

=== Combination Cookbooks ===
1. Comfort Cooking (Oct/08)
2. Comfort Cravings (Oct/11)
3. Delightful Bites (Mar/07)
4. Family Favourites For the Holidays (July/07)
5. Healthy Choices (Jan/08)
6. Hot From the Pot (Aug/10)
7. Make it Fast, Cook it Slow (July/07)
8. Meals in Minutes (July/07)
9. Meals in No Time (Aug/06)
10. Meals Made Easy (June/08)
11. Quick & Easy Entertaining (Sep/05)
12. The Rookie Cook's Companion (Jan/09)
13. Sizzling Grills & Spectacular Salads (May/09)
14. Slow Cooker & Soup Recipes (Sep/12)
15. Tempting Treats and Cookies (Nov/10)

=== Creative Series ===
1. Beading (Dec/08)
2. Card Making (Feb/08)
3. Crocheting (Dec/08)
4. Knitting (Feb/08)
5. Patchwork Quilting (Feb/08)
6. Sewing (Dec/08)

=== Pattern Series ===
1. Crocheting Slippers (Sept/11)
2. Crocheting Toys (Nov/11)
3. Knitting for Dogs (Nov/11)
4. Knitting Winter Accessories (Nov/11)
5. Quilting Pot Holders (Sept/11)
6. Sewing Aprons (Sept/11)

=== Workshop Series ===
1. Kids Learn to Knit, Quilt & Crochet (Aug/09)
2. Learn to Bead Earrings (Apr/10)
3. Learn to Bead Jewellery (Nov/09)
4. Learn to Craft With Paper (Nov/09)
5. Learn To Crochet Decorative Edgings (Apr/12)
6. Learn to Crochet for Baby (Apr/11)
7. Learn to Crochet in a Day (Apr/10)
8. Learn to Knit for Baby (Aug/09)
9. Learn to Knit in The Round (Nov/09)
10. Learn To Knit Lace (Apr/12)
11. Learn to Knit Socks (Apr/10)
12. Learn To Make Cards With Folds (Apr/11)
13. Learn to Make Cards With Photos (Aug/09)
14. Learn to Quilt Fat Quarters (Apr/11)
15. Learn To Quilt Table Runners & Placemats (Apr/12)
16. Learn to Quilt With Panels (Aug/09)
17. Learn to Sew for The Table (Nov/09)
