= Youth Empowerment & Support Services =

Youth empowerment organization in Canada

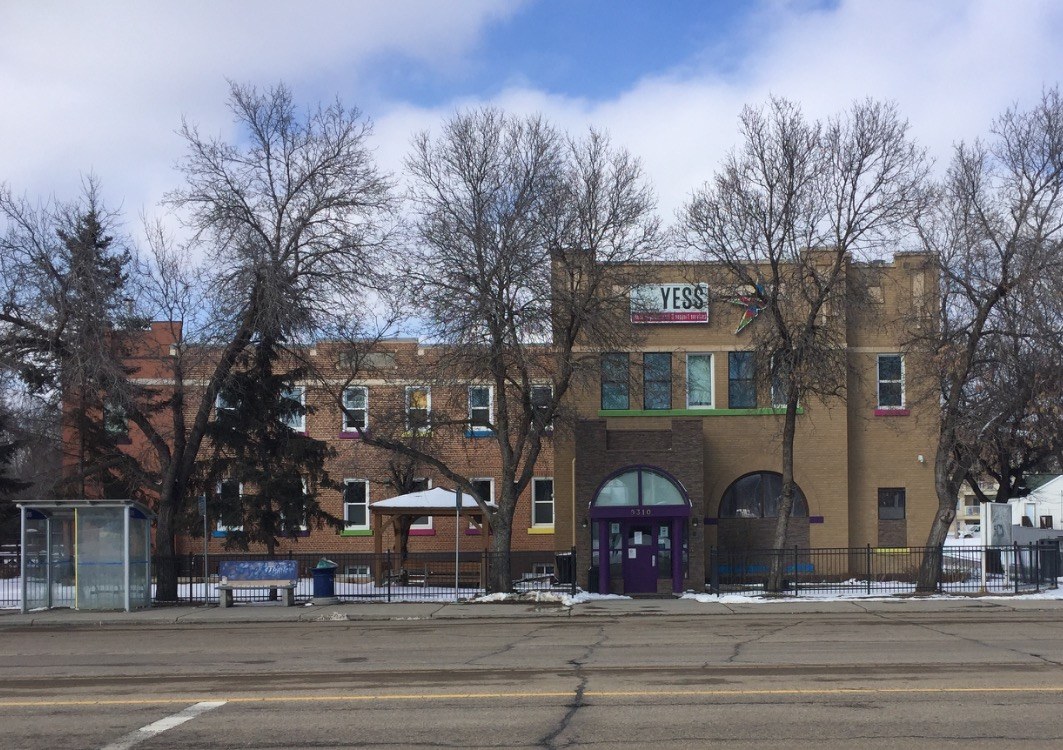
- YESS headquarters at 9310 82 Avenue
- Formation: Non-profit: 1978; Building opening: 1982
- Type: Not-for-profit
- Location: Edmonton, Alberta, Canada
- Region served: Edmonton metropolitan region
- President: Corey Mowles
- Website: https://yess.org/

Youth Empowerment & Support Services, commonly referred to as YESS, is a youth empowerment and housing organization in Edmonton, Alberta, Canada.

== History ==
YESS first registered as a not-for-profit in 1978, although its youth shelter at 9310 82 Avenue in Edmonton did not open until 1982.

== Services ==
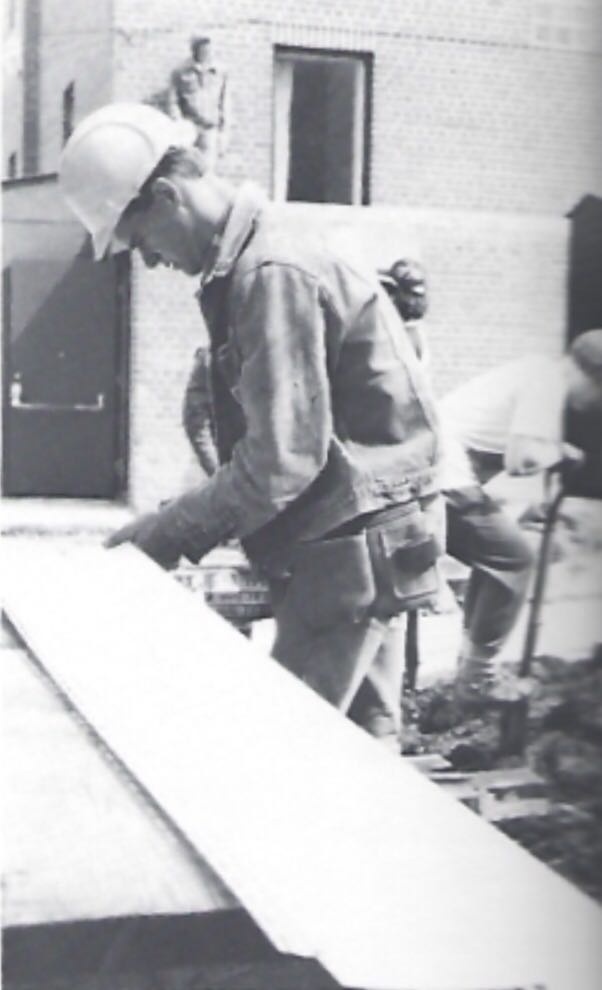
An employee of Rainbow Metal Products works at YESS in 1986

In 2016, YESS introduced the tagline "YESS is more than a shelter." Although YESS provides housing for at-risk youth in the Edmonton Capital Region, the organization is also dedicated to providing individualized support that addresses both diversion out of homelessness and general prevention of homelessness.

== Buildings ==
The YESS buildings are located at 9310 82 Avenue in Edmonton, including the main shelter, a gazebo, and several storage buildings. The main building was built in 1905 as Edmonton Fire Hall No. 10 for the communities surrounding Mill Creek Ravine. In 1926, the Salvation Army converted the fire hall into a shelter named Bonnie Doon Eventide Home, and in 1949, the main building became a single men's shelter. Although Ken Lenz has stated that "the building was vacant for almost a decade beginning in the early 1970s," the Salvation Army did not actually sell the building until 1979, with YESS taking over the building in early 1980s. In 1986, Edmonton company Rainbow Metal Products built eves, gutters, soffit, and fascia for YESS, whose buildings are now recognized for their Late Art Deco architectural style.

== Region served ==
YESS is located in Edmonton's French Quarter, also known as Bonnie Doon. (Note: YESS is located in the western part of Bonnie Doon, which was originally part of the City of Strathcona dating back to 1907 and became a part of Edmonton when Strathcona and Edmonton merged in 1912. The remaining land in the neighbourhood was annexed by the city of Edmonton in 1908.) The neighborhood is home to Edmonton's Franco-Albertan community and contains the only francophone university and the only Francophone high school west of Manitoba, namely the University of Alberta's Campus Saint-Jean and École Maurice-Lavallée. Although YESS is a community organization located within a recognized ethnic enclave in Edmonton, it serves youth from throughout the Edmonton metropolitan region.
