= Kerry Pawluski =

- Citizenship: Canadian
- Known for: Patient Advocacy
- Scientific career
- Fields: Doctor of Medicine Aviation
- Institutions: Blatchford Field Medical Clinic

Kerry Pawluski is a Canadian medical doctor and pilot based in Edmonton, Alberta, Canada. Pawluski is the founding director of Angel Flight Alberta, the Alberta chapter of a broader group of Canadian Angel Flight providers. Having practiced rural medicine Pawluski is a strong advocate for a patient's right to speedy and convenient access to tertiary care through Medevac and Air Ambulance services. In doing so Pawluski has opposed Edmonton City Council's decision to permanently close the Edmonton City Centre Airport.

== See also ==
- Rural Health
- Northern Alberta
