= Jillianne Code =

Canadian researcher and learning scientist

- Born: 1976 (age 49–50) (Note: In 2016, Code was reported to be 39); Edmonton, Alberta
- Spouse: Nick Zaparyniuk

Academic background
- Education: BEd, Secondary Education, 1999, MEd, Educational Psychology, 2002, University of Alberta; PhD, Educational Psychology, 2010, Simon Fraser University
- Thesis: Assessing Agency for Learning (2010)

Academic work
- Institutions: University of British Columbia; University of Victoria
- Main interests: Learning sciences Translational research
- Website: jillianne.ca heartfailuretoharvard.com

Jillianne Reay Code (born 1976) is a Canadian researcher and learning scientist. She is an associate professor in the faculty of Education at the University of British Columbia and director of the Assessment for Learning in Immersion and Virtual Environments (ALIVE) research lab.

In addition to her academic scholarship, Code became a public health advocate following her diagnosis of heart failure in 2005 and subsequent surgeries for an implantable cardioverter-defibrillator in 2010 and left ventricular assist device in 2014. She has received two heart transplants and writes about her experiences on her blog Heart Failure to Harvard.

Code co-founded the HeartLife Foundation with Marc Bains and Dr. Sean Virani in 2016 and received the Dr. Harold N. Segall Award of Merit from the Canadian Cardiovascular Society in 2019 in recognition of their significant contribution to the prevention of cardiovascular disease and promotion of cardiovascular health in Canadians.

== Early life and education ==
Code was born in Edmonton, Alberta, Canada and earned her Bachelor of Education and Master's degree from the University of Alberta. On July 18, 2005, she drove from Edmonton to British Columbia where she experienced her first congestive heart failure. She was diagnosed with Idiopathic Cardiomyopathy and given 72 hours to live. Code was stabilized with medical therapy before earning her PhD at Simon Fraser University. As a graduate student, Code was recognized by the American Educational Research Association for her work.

With her PhD in educational psychology, Code accepted a one-year post-doctoral research fellowship at the Harvard Graduate School of Education in Assessment and Learning Technologies. During her post-doctoral fellowship Code had surgery for an implantable cardioverter-defibrillator She was later hospitalized with end-stage heart failure and placed on the heart transplant waiting list, during which she received a left ventricular assist device. A donor was found in 2014 but complications during the surgery led to her being sent into a medically induced coma for eight days. When she awoke from her coma, it was discovered that she had severe delirium and muscle atrophy. Her heart transplant journey is documented on her blog Heart Failure to Harvard and in I am the Clinical Trial for the JACC: Heart Failure journal.

== Career ==
In 2011, Code accepted an assistant professor position at the University of Victoria (UVic) where she co-edited Massive Open Online Courses for the Journal of Online Learning and Teaching and received Outstanding Paper Awards from the World Conference on Educational Media and Technology in 2011, 2013 and 2016. She was also awarded a Social Sciences and Humanities Research Council grant for her research Assessment for Learning in Immersive Virtual Environments (ALIVE).

In 2016, Code collaborated with Marc Bains and Dr. Sean Virani at the national meeting of the Canadian Heart Failure Society in Montreal, Canada, to create a patient-led advocacy organization for Canadians living with heart failure called The HeartLife Foundation of Canada. It became the first and only heart failure advocacy group in Canada to be run by patients in Canada.

In June 2017, Code accepted a tenure-tracked assistant professor of Media and Technology Studies Education at the University of British Columbia (UBC). That same year, she suffered a heart attack and required a second heart transplant. Her first transplanted heart developed fast-acting cardiac allograft vasculopathy so she had an emergency re-transplant at St. Paul's Hospital. Upon returning to UBC, she published Assessment in immersive virtual environments: Cases for learning, of learning, and as learning and was appointed to the British Columbia Medical Services Commission Board. She also sits on the Heart & Stroke heart failure council. In 2019, Code and her Heartlife colleagues received the Dr. Harold N. Segall Award of Merit from the Canadian Cardiovascular Society "in recognition of a significant contribution to the promotion of cardiovascular health in Canadians." In 2022, she received the Killam Teaching Prize in recognition of excellence in her teaching. In July 2023, she was promoted to the rank of associate professor with tenure.

Code features in the 2023 documentary My Broken Heart, directed by her husband, Nick Zap. The documentary is an "unflinching look at the possible complications and consequences of organ transplantation" and was premiered at the Vancouver International Film Festival Centre on March 26, 2023.

=== Research ===
Code's research focus is on the area of translational research across education, health, medicine, and STEM; student agency, learning technology, and educational assessment. She specializes in mixed methods research and uses autoethnography to educate others about the lived experience of heart failure and heart transplant. In 2020, she published "Agency for learning: Intention, motivation, self-efficacy and self-regulation" in the journal Frontiers in Education and Pandemic designs for the future: Perspectives of technology education teachers during COVID-19 in a special issue of the journal Information and Learning Science. The article explores the effects of the COVID-19 pandemic on public school teachers.

== Personal life ==
Code is married to Nick Zaparyniuk and participates in running events in her free time.
