= Santas Anonymous =

Annual charitable campaign in Edmonton, Alberta, Canada

Santas Anonymous is an annual campaign providing new toys for families in need in Edmonton, Alberta, Canada.

Santas Anonymous began in 1955 when CHED radio general manager Jerry Forbes learned there were many children in Edmonton "who simply went without a gift during the Christmas season." When Forbes was asked why he started Santas Anonymous, he said

"wouldn't it be great if there would be no needy kids..and every kid had a present...not a used present...with wheels stuck on and repainted....but a brand new present. From that modest start we said well...lets do it. So we went ahead and for the first few years we ran it up on the second floor here just with my staff and from there it just grew and grew and now its part of the overall system of the Christmas Bureau ."

From a few thousand children in 1955, the charity has grown to over 25,000 children. The program owes its success to hundreds of volunteers who wrap and deliver toys, and the generosity of thousands of Edmontonians who drop new, unwrapped toys off at collection sites located throughout the Edmonton area.

The Edmonton based Santas Anonymous should not be confused with the student run campaign Father Mercredi Santas (Also known as Santas Anonymous), which is run by students in Fort McMurray, Alberta.
