= Beatrice Carmichael =

- Born: November 6, 1889; South Bend, Indiana
- Died: March 11, 1964; Edmonton, Alberta
- Occupation(s): Opera singer, orchestra conductor

Beatrice Carmichael (born Caroline Beatrice Van Loon) was an opera singer and orchestra conductor known in Canada as "Edmonton's Grand Dame of the opera."

== Background ==
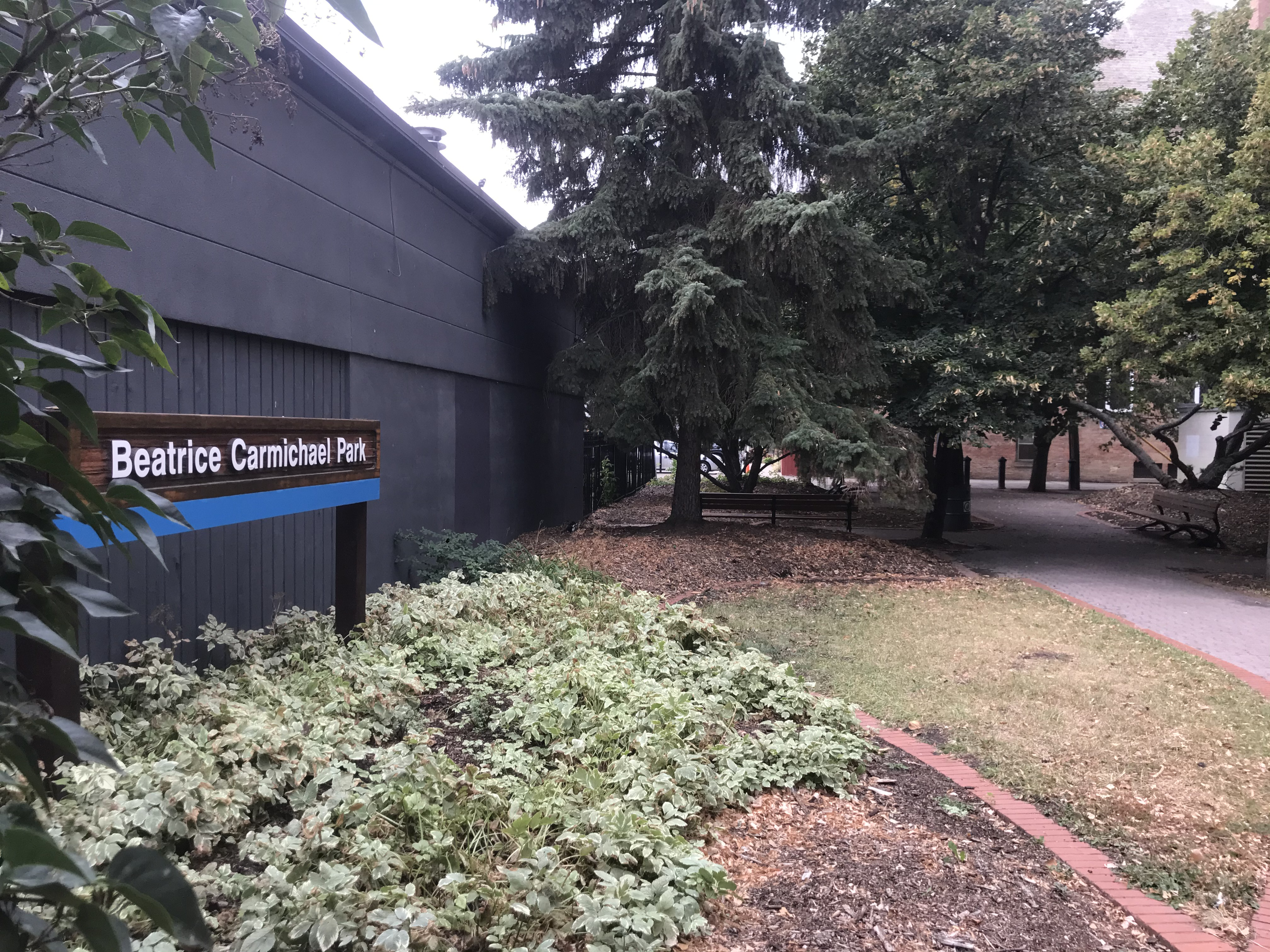
Beatrice Carmichael Park in Edmonton, Alberta

Born in South Bend, Indiana, she was the daughter of a talented professional musician, Henry van Loon. She started into music at around four years old by singing an onstage solo. At the age of sixteen she conducted her first operetta, "Little Red Riding Hood". She won a gold medal at a Chicago singing competition when she was seventeen. During the period around World War I, she obtained a bachelor's degree in Music and was also being coached by a Chicago-based German opera singer.

== Career ==
Beatrice became involved as a vocalist with the Chicago Symphony Orchestra. Her rapidly accumulating qualifications soon allowed her to become the leader of a newly formed all-girl Dutch orchestra which traveled to and fro across the entire United States. She was asked if she could perform in Edmonton, Alberta. Beatrice and her band played in the dining room of the Hotel Macdonald for several months. She met Dr. James B. Carmichael, an Edmonton dentist, whom she fell in love with and married hardly one year into her stay, on November 3, 1920. Edmonton had officially gained a new citizen. In 1923 she set up the University Philharmonic Society, which produced and conducted operas with the help of staff and students from the University of Alberta throughout the mid-1920s. In 1935 she founded the Edmonton Civic Opera Company. She directed 50 operas in the years to follow. Beatrice also taught voice, violin and piano. She organized and conducted the CKUA Radio Orchestra.

== Awards ==
She was awarded in 1961 a citation from the City of Edmonton. A park in the downtown area of Edmonton is named after her.

== Bibliography ==
- Naming Edmonton ISBN 0-88864-423-X
