= Mary Imrie =

Canadian architect

- Born: August 29, 1918; Toronto, Ontario, Canada
- Died: April 11, 1988 (aged 69); Edmonton, Alberta, Canada
- Occupation: Architect
- Known for: Residential projects during Edmonton's post-war construction boom
- Partner: Jean Wallbridge

Mary Imrie (August 29, 1918 – April 11, 1988) was a Canadian architect. She was one of the first women in Canada to establish an architectural firm. She is also considered to be Edmonton's first female architect.

== Biography ==
Born in Toronto, Ontario to a well-to-do family, Imrie's parents moved to Edmonton, Alberta when she was three years old. Her father was John M. Imrie, an Edmonton newspaper publisher who won a Pulitzer prize. She first studied architecture at the University of Alberta and then at the University of Toronto, studying under Eric Arthur and graduating in 1944. From 1946-1949, she worked for the city of Edmonton as a draftsman, along with her future partner Jean Wallbridge. While there, the municipality sent both of them to Europe to study post-war reconstruction methods.

In 1950, Imrie and Wallbridge formed a business partnership in Edmonton, working together until 1979, the time of Wallbridge's death. They built mostly homes that were known for their elegant yet modern lines. They were also able to procure several commercial contracts, such as elementary schools and housing for senior citizens.

In 1957, their firm won a Canadian Housing Design Council award. Despite the high caliber of their work, as female architects they had a harder time obtaining larger commissions. Women in that era were often relegated to the less lucrative residential or interior design markets. Imrie and Wallbridge also traveled extensively, visiting several continents, and writing about their experiences for a journal owned by the Royal Architectural Institute of Canada.

In 1957, Imrie and Wallbridge built their own home "Six Acres" in Edmonton where they lived as a couple.

Concerning her professional work, Imrie stated, "It was a grind, in a cold hard world. But I would like to add, it was also satisfying and a lot of fun!" She was a member of the Royal Architectural Institute of Canada and the Alberta Association of Architects. A travel grant is named after her at The University of Alberta, called the "Mary Louise Imrie Graduate Student Award". Interested by Alberta's natural landscapes, Imrie bequeathed the bulk of her estate to the Parks Venture Fund of Alberta. She donated her home, the "Imrie House", as well as the land located next to the North Saskatchewan River.
