= Barbara Sibbald =

Canadian novelist and journalist

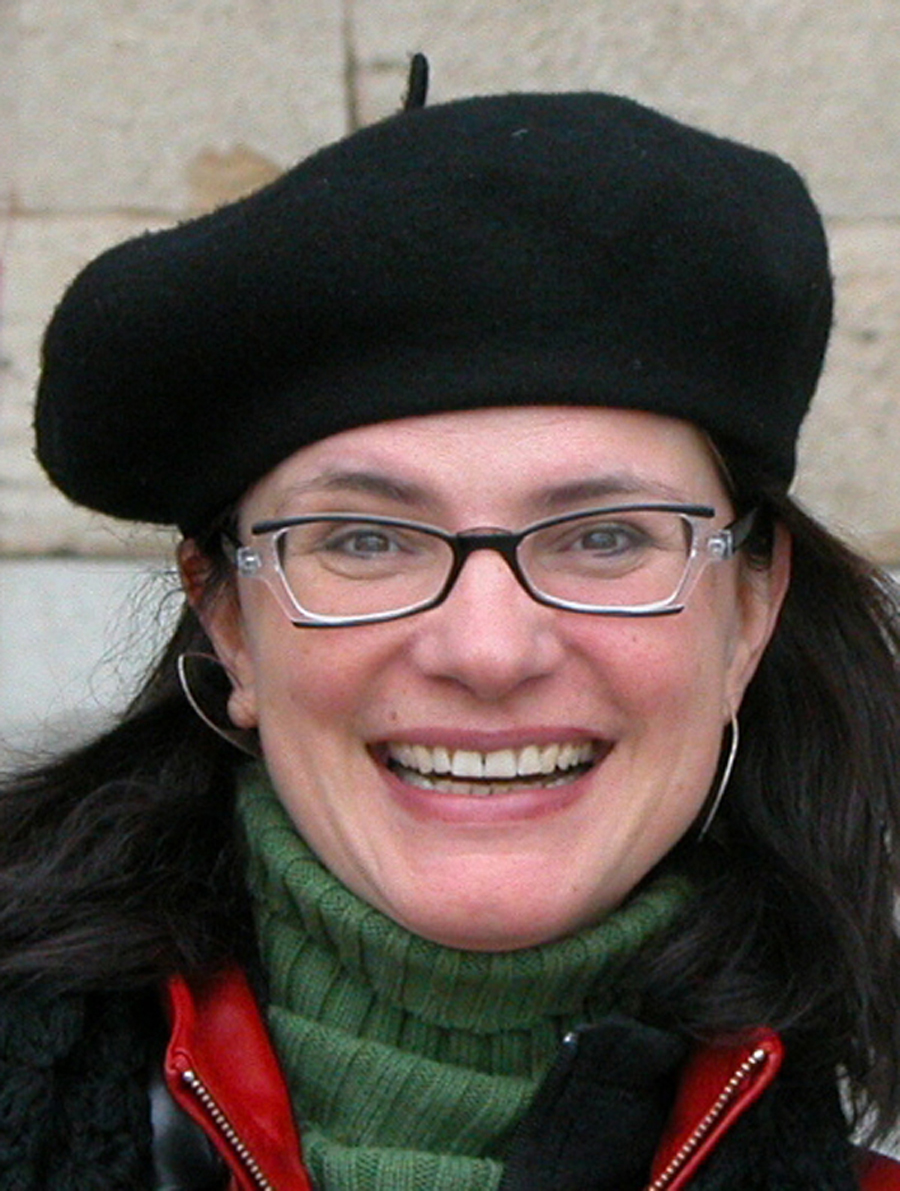
- Born: July 19, 1958 (age 68); Red Deer, Alberta, Canada
- Education: BA Journalism, Carleton University, Ottawa (Canada)
- Occupations: Novelist, journalist
- Writing career
- Period: Present
- Genres: Fiction and Nonfiction, with a focus on health and medical journalism
- Notable works: Almost English (2025), The Museum of Possibilities (2016),The Book of Love: Guidance in Affairs of the Heart (2011) and Regarding Wanda (2006)
- Website: barbarasibbald.com

Barbara Sibbald is a Canadian fiction writer and an award-winning freelance journalist based in Ottawa, Ontario, Canada. She has published four works of fiction, most recently the biofiction Almost English (Bayeux Arts, 2025) based on the life of her Eurasian great-grandfather and grandmother in the North of India during the Raj (1885–1912). Her collection of short fiction, The Museum of Possibilities (The Porcupine's Quill, 2016) won Gold in the Foreword Indies 2017 Book Awards, short story category and Silver in the eLit Book Awards 2018, short story fiction category. She has also published The Book of Love: Guidance in Affairs of the Heart (General Store Publishing House, 2011), and Regarding Wanda (Bunkhouse Press, 2006), which was short-listed for the Ottawa Book Award.

== Career ==
She has published numerous short stories in anthologies and literary journals such as Shift, The Capilano Review, Antigonish Review and The New Quarterly. Two of her short stories have been nominated for the Journey Prize in fiction writing. She has also been the recipient of a City of Ottawa Arts Grant (for Regarding Wanda) and a Canada Council writing grant (for The Book of Love), and has participated in the Banff Centre Writing Studio workshops.

Sibbald's nonfiction journalism includes extensive writing on health, medical and lifestyle issues, published in the Canadian Medical Association Journal, where she was editor of the news and humanities sections. She has also been a regular contributor to the Ottawa Citizen and the Huffington Post, and is a frequent contributor to other major Canadian media outlets, such as The Globe and Mail and Chatelaine magazine.

She was twice cited for the Michener Award for meritorious public service in journalism; has been recognized with the Canadian Association of Journalists' investigative journalism prize (2006); and has twice won gold awards for breaking news from the Canadian Business Press.
