= Chuck Dubuque =

Canadian football player (1932–2020)

Profile
- Position: Halfback

Personal information
- Born: July 2, 1932; Edmonton, Alberta
- Died: February 13, 2020 (aged 87); Vancouver, British Columbia
- Listed height: 5 ft 11 in (1.80 m)
- Listed weight: 180 lb (82 kg)

Career history
- 1956–1959: BC Lions

Charles Polcher Dubuque (July 2, 1932 – February 13, 2020) was a Canadian professional football player who played for the BC Lions.
