= Jean Paré =

Canadian caterer, cookbook author (1927–2022)

Jean Paré CM
- Born: December 7, 1927; Irma, Alberta, Canada
- Died: December 24, 2022 (aged 95); Edmonton, Alberta, Canada
- Occupation: Author
- Years active: 1981–2011
- Organization: Company's Coming Publishing Limited
- Known for: Author of Canada's most popular cookbooks
- Notable work: Company's Coming
- Children: Lyall Lovig, Brian Lovig, Grant Lovig and Gail Lovig
- Awards: Member of the Order of Canada (2004); Queen Elizabeth II Golden Jubilee Medal (2003)
- Website: www.companyscoming.com

Jean Paré, CM (December 7, 1927 – December 24, 2022) was a Canadian caterer, author of the Company's Coming cookbook series, and founder of Company's Coming Publishing Limited. She was one of the top-selling cookbook authors in the world, selling 30 million copies as of 2011. She wrote over 200 cookbooks before her retirement in 2011. In 2004, she was made a Member of the Order of Canada (CM), Canada's highest civilian honour.

== Life ==
Paré was born on December 7, 1927, in Irma, Alberta, to Edward and Ruby Elford. The family moved to Edmonton. Jean married her first husband, Clarence Lovig, in 1946. In 1959, they moved to Vermilion, Alberta, where they owned and operated the Vermilion Auction Mart. Later they built and operated the Vegreville Auction Mart as well. Jean and Clarence were divorced in the mid 1960s, leaving Jean on her own with two school-age children to support.

Using a $1,000 loan from a local bank, she opened a small café in Vermilion. There, she met her second husband, Larry Paré, a single father of three children.

Jean Paré was the author of Company's Coming cookbooks, published and distributed by Company's Coming Publishing Limited, which she co-founded in 1981. She oversaw publication of more than 17,000 kitchen-tested recipes and the publication of more than 200 cookbooks. After 30 years and 30 million cookbooks sold, she retired in February 2011.

Prior to publishing cookbooks, Paré was a caterer in her home town of Vermilion, Alberta. Because of requests for her recipes, she wrote and published her first cookbook in 1981 at the age of 53. To begin, 15,000 copies of 150 Delicious Squares were produced, and sold in specially designed racks at gas stations, grocery stores, and at local fairs. This first book was the start for Company's Coming Publishing Limited. Paré went on to have more than 200 Company's Coming cookbooks published before her retirement in 2011, selling 30 million copies. Her cookbooks are typically about a single subject with easy to follow recipes that rely upon readily available ingredients.

Jean Paré was also a principal shareholder in COMAC Food Group. That company owned Company's Coming Bakery Cafés, Grabbajabba Specialty Coffee, Pastels Cafés, and the Canadian rights to the Domino's Pizza franchise.

Among her accomplishments was her appointment as a Member of the Order of Canada.

In 2009, she donated her collection of 6,700 cookbooks, many of them collections of recipes from women from community organizations, churches, and Canadian local groups, to the University of Guelph.

Paré died on December 24, 2022, at the age of 95.
