= Jean Wallbridge =

Canadian architect

- Born: Jean Louise Emberly Wallbridge; October 25, 1912; Edmonton, Alberta
- Died: September 30, 1979 (aged 66)
- Known for: Architecture
- Partner: Mary Imrie

Jean Louise Emberly Wallbridge (October 25, 1912 – September 30, 1979) was a Canadian architect. In 1950, with Mary Imrie, she was one of the first Canadian women to form an architectural partnership.

== Biography ==
She was born in Edmonton, Alberta, the third daughter of James and Mabel Wallbridge. Her father, James Wallbridge, was a prominent lawyer. She was educated at private schools in Victoria, British Columbia, Switzerland and England and at Victoria Composite High School in Edmonton. Wallbridge went on to study architecture with Cecil Burgess at the University of Alberta, receiving a BSc in Applied Science in 1939.

In February 1941, she became the third woman to be registered with the Alberta Association of Architects. She worked for an architectural firm in Edmonton and then for the town planning commission in Saint John, New Brunswick. From 1946 to 1949, she worked in the Department of the City Architect in Edmonton. When that office closed in 1950, she worked mainly on residential projects in Edmonton in partnership with Imrie until her death in 1979. In 1957, they won the Canadian Housing Design Council award.

Wallbridge and Imrie built their own home "Six Acres" in Edmonton, where they lived as a couple.

Wallbridge died in Edmonton at the age of 66.
