= List of people from Montreal =

This is a list of notable people from Montreal.

== A ==
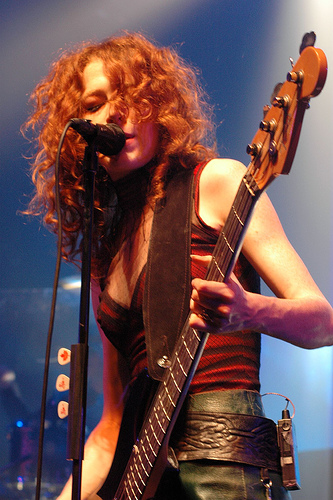
Melissa Auf der Maur

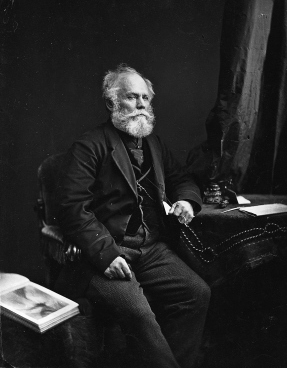
Sir Hugh Allan of Ravenscrag

- Sir John Joseph Caldwell Abbott – prime minister of Canada
- Scott Abbott – co-inventor of Trivial Pursuit
- Jennifer Abel – diver, Olympic medalist
- David Acer – magician and comedian, star of Mystery Hunters
- Frances Payne Adler – American and Canadian poet
- Marie-Yasmine Alidou – soccer player for the Canada national team
- Andrew Allan – Allan Shipping Line
- Sir Hugh Allan – Allan Shipping Line
- Martha Allan – founder of the Montreal Repertory Theatre
- Sir Montague Allan – businessman, donated the Allan Cup
- Paul Almond – film director
- Sidney Altman – Nobel Laureate in Chemistry
- Melissa Sue Anderson – American-Canadian actress, known for her role as Mary Ingalls on Little House on the Prairie
- René Angélil – singer, Celine Dion's husband and manager
- Richard Bladworth Angus – founder of the Canadian Pacific Railway
- Joel Anthony – NBA basketball player
- Alex Anthopoulos – general manager and president of baseball operations for the Atlanta Braves
- Louise Arbour – lawyer, jurist, prosecutor
- Nelly Arcan – writer
- Denys Arcand – filmmaker
- Gilles Archambault – novelist
- François Arnaud – actor
- Jay Aspin – former MP
- William H. Atherton – historian
- Gabriel Aubry – model
- Melissa Auf der Maur – rock musician (Hole, The Smashing Pumpkins)
- Nick Auf der Maur – journalist, municipal politician
- Michel C. Auger – journalist
- Félix Auger-Aliassime – tennis player
- Adam Azimov – film director
- David Azrieli – real estate developer

== B ==
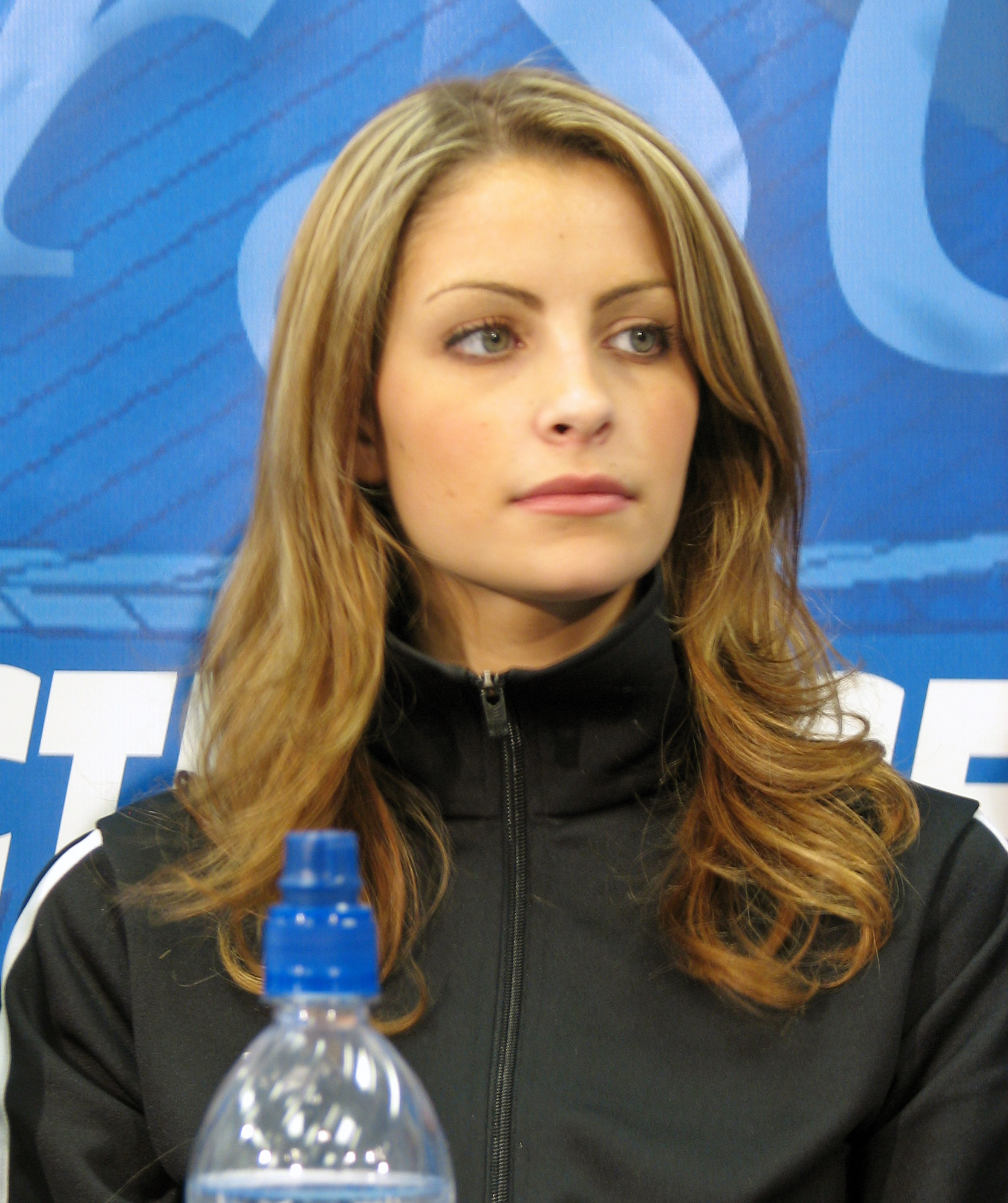
Tanith Belbin

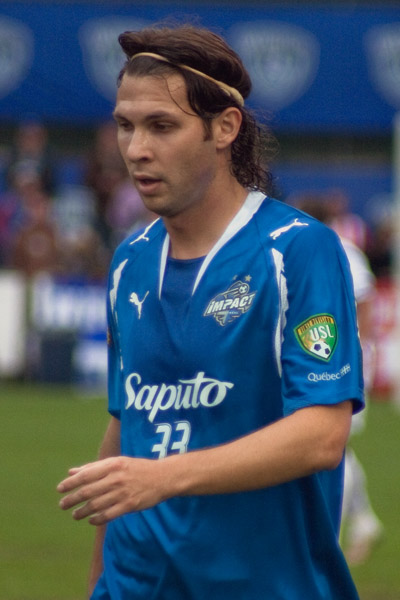
Adam Braz

- Ralph Backstrom – former NHL player
- Rita Baga – drag queen, television personality and host
- Joby Baker – actor, painter
- René Balcer – television writer and producer, known for the US television show Law and Order
- Jean-Paul Banos – fencer
- Roger Barnes – professional wrestler
- Joseph Barsalou – businessman and politician
- Jay Baruchel – television and movie actor
- Doug Beardsley – poet and educator
- Bianca Beauchamp – fetish fashion model
- Charles-Odilon Beauchemin – printer and bookseller
- Mathieu Beaudoin – football player
- Tanith Belbin – figure skater, Olympic silver medalist
- Louise Belcourt – artist
- Jean Béliveau – former NHL player
- Saul Bellow – novelist
- Mercédes Benegbi – disabilities activist
- Sonia Benezra – broadcaster, television host
- Meaghan Benfeito – diver, Olympic medalist
- Chris Benoit – pro wrestler and double-murderer
- Jehane Benoît – chef, author, TV personality
- Aldo Bensadoun – founder of Aldo Group
- Marc Bergevin – former NHL player, hockey executive
- Eric Berne – psychiatrist; creator of Transactional Analysis; author
- Janette Bertrand – journalist, broadcaster, actress
- André Besette – CSC Holy Cross Brother, "miracle worker of Montreal"
- Norman Bethune – physician, medical innovator, and political activist
- Tim Biakabutuka – former NFL football player, Carolina Panthers
- Charlie Biddle – Montreal Jazz pioneer, Juno Award winner
- Dan Bilefsky – journalist, author
- Alexandre Bilodeau – skier, Olympic gold medalist
- Khem Birch – NBA Player
- Yannick Bisson – actor known for playing Det. Murdoch in Murdoch Mysteries and Jack in Sue Thomas: F.B. Eye
- Conrad Black – financier and newspaper magnate
- Herbert Black – businessman
- Sheila Blair – art historian
- Toe Blake – former NHL player and coach
- Valérie Blass – artist
- Paul Bley – jazz pianist
- Bob Blumer – tv personality
- La Bolduc – real name Mary Travers, singer
- Moïse Bombito – soccer player
- Patrick Bordeleau – hockey player
- Daniel Borsuk – plastic surgeon
- Mike Bossy – Hockey Hall of Fame member
- Alain Bouchard – billionaire businessman
- Émile Bouchard – NHL Hall of Famer
- Eugenie Bouchard – tennis player
- Jean-François Bouchard – photographer and visual designer
- Louise Anne Bouchard – writer
- Chris Boucher – NBA player
- Maurice "Mom" Boucher – ex-leader of Hell's Angels (as of 2014)
- Yassine Bounou – footballer
- Henri Bourassa – political leader and publisher
- Robert Bourassa – former Quebec premier
- Pierre Bourque – mayor
- Raymond Bourque – former NHL player, Hockey Hall of Fame member
- Pierre Bouvier – frontman of Simple Plan; songwriter
- Scotty Bowman – hockey coach
- Stan Bowman – NHL general manager
- Justin Bradley – actor, based out of Montreal and Toronto, sometimes works in Los Angeles
- Tim Brady – guitarist, composer
- Glenda Braganza – Hollywood actress, 10.5: Apocalypse
- Gilles Brassard – computer scientist
- Nigel Braun – YouTuber and chemist
- Adam Braz – former soccer defender
- Patrice Brisebois – NHL player, Montreal Canadiens
- Annie Brocoli – real name Annie Grenier, children's performer
- Martin Brodeur – NHL player, goaltender, New Jersey Devils
- Charles Bronfman – businessman and philanthropist
- Edgar Bronfman, Sr. – businessman
- Edward Bronfman – businessman, philanthropist, member of the Bronfman family
- Peter Bronfman – businessman, member of the Bronfman family
- Saidye Rosner Bronfman – philanthropist, wife of Samuel Bronfman
- Samuel Bronfman – liquor magnate
- Stephen Bronfman – philanthropist
- Alma Faye Brooks – disco, soul and R&B singer
- Harriet Brooks – nuclear physicist, researcher
- Nicole Brossard – author, poet
- Alexander Brott – conductor, composer
- Edwin Orion Brownell – pianist, vocalist
- John Brownstein – epidemiologist, professor
- Francine Brunel-Reeves - singer, caller and researcher
- Kim Brunhuber – journalist newscaster
- Geneviève Bujold – actress
- Hy Buller – former NHL All-Star player
- Mario Bunge – philosopher, Frothingham Chair of Logic and Metaphysics at McGill University
- Stéphan Bureau – journalist
- Pat Burns – NHL head coach
- Robin Burns – founder and owner, ITECH Hockey Equipment
- Pascale Bussières – actress
- Ernie Butler – comedy club owner
- Gerard Butler – Scottish actor; lived here briefly as a baby
- Win Butler – singer-songwriter

== C ==
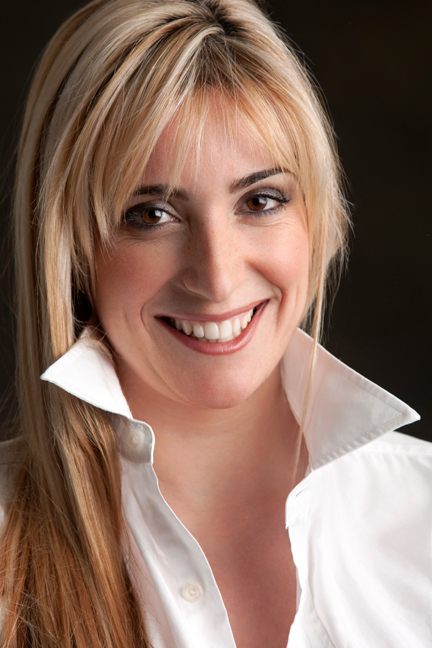
Françoise de Clossey

- Anne-Marie Cadieux – actress
- Ghitta Caiserman-Roth – painter, printmaker
- Jesse Camacho – actor
- Mark Camacho – actor
- Charles Sandwith Campbell – businessman, philanthropist
- Charlotte Cardin – singer, songwriter
- Paul Cargnello – singer-songwriter
- Jean Carignan – fiddler
- Alexandre Carrier – NHL player
- Gerald Emmett Carter – former cardinal archbishop of Toronto
- Thérèse Casgrain – politician, suffragist
- André Chagnon – telecommunications and broadcasting executive, philanthropist
- Gretta Chambers – journalist
- Serge Chapleau – political cartoonist
- Corinne Chaponnière – writer, journalist
- Jean Charest – former Québec premier and onetime leader of the federal Progressive Conservatives
- Robert Charlebois – singer-songwriter
- Gregory Charles – musician and radio host
- Dov Charney – entrepreneur and CEO of American Apparel
- Melvin Charney – artist, sculptor, architect
- Claude Charron – former politician, now TV host
- Régine Chassagne – musician, singer, member of Arcade Fire
- Micheline Chevrier – theatre director
- Alex Chiasson – NHL player for the Edmonton Oilers
- Patricia Chica – film and TV director
- Emmanuelle Chriqui – actress
- Denny Chronopoulos – CFL player
- Terri Clark – country singer-songwriter
- Patricia Claxton – literary translator
- Françoise de Clossey – pianist and organist
- Guy Cloutier – former artist manager
- Véronique Cloutier – radio and television personality
- Kim Cloutier – fashion model
- Cœur de pirate – singer, songwriter
- G. A. Cohen – political philosopher
- Leonard Cohen – poet and singer
- Mark Cohen – ophthalmologist, co-founder of LASIK MD
- Sidney M. Cohen – television director
- Steven Cojocaru – fashion critic
- John Colicos – actor
- Charles Comeau – drummer of Simple Plan and songwriter
- Phil Comeau – film and TV director
- Antonio Cordasco – Italian-Canadian migrant labour recruiter
- Ernest Cormier – engineer and architect
- Marc Costanzo – singer
- Corneille – singer
- Irwin Cotler – law professor, politician
- Vincenzo Cotroni – mobster
- Jean Coutu – pharmacist
- Corey Crawford – NHL starting goaltender for the Chicago Blackhawks
- Ron Crevier – former NBA basketball player
- Marie-Josée Croze – actress
- Katalin Cseh – Hungarian politician
- Beto Cuevas – Chilean-Canadian lead singer of band La Ley
- Peter Cullen – voice actor; voice of Optimus Prime in the film Transformers
- Maxwell Cummings – businessman, philanthropist
- Nathan Cummings – businessman
- Elisha Cuthbert – actress
- Louis Cyr – strongman
- May Cutler – publisher and journalist; founder of Tundra Books; first Canadian woman to publish children's books; first woman to serve as Mayor of Westmount, Quebec

== D ==
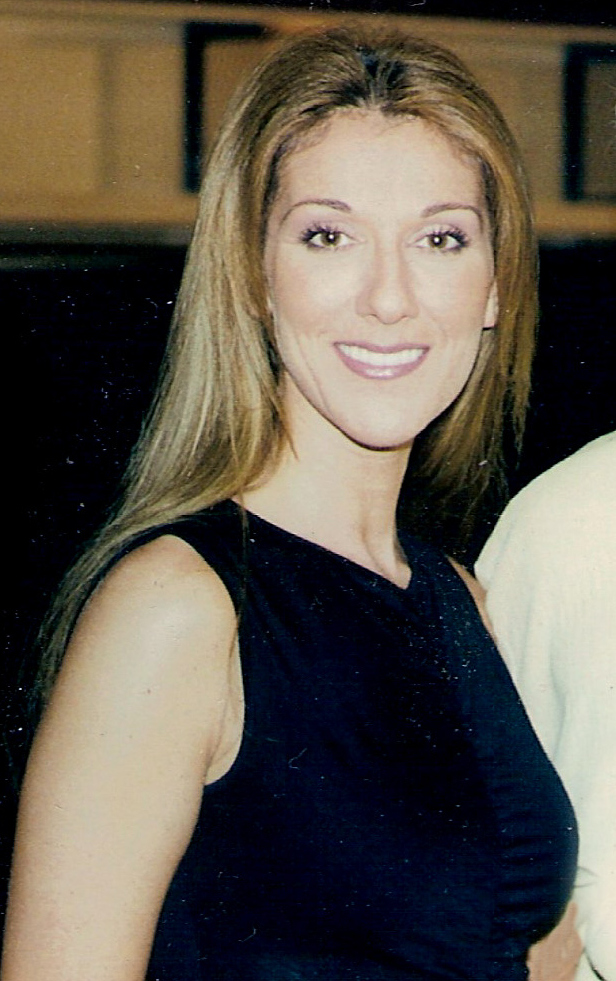
Celine Dion

- Samuel Dalembert – NBA basketball player, Philadelphia 76ers
- Peter Dalla Riva – football player, Montreal Alouettes
- Roméo Dallaire – senator, Lieutenant-General
- Vincent Damphousse – former NHL player
- Shawn Daniels – Canadian football player
- Catherine Daoust – Professional ice hockey defenceman for the Montreal Victoire in the Professional Women's Hockey League (PWHL).
- J. P. Darche – NFL football player, Seattle Seahawks
- Mathieu Darche – NHL player, Tampa Bay Lightning, Montreal Canadiens
- Françoise David – politician
- John Caswell Davis – politician
- Mitch Davis – film programmer, filmmaker, journalist
- Mortimer Davis – businessman, philanthropist
- Norman Dawe – sports executive
- Michel de Broin – sculptor
- Philippe de Gaspé Beaubien – broadcasting, magazines
- Stéphane Demers – actor
- Bernard Derome – anchorman
- Pierre Desjardins – football player, Montreal Alouettes
- Roxane Desjardins – writer
- André Desmarais – businessman
- Paul Desmarais, Sr. – businessman
- Paul Desmarais, Jr. – businessman
- Alexandre Despatie – diver, Olympic medalist, television personality
- David Desrosiers – bassist of Simple Plan and vocalist; born in Sept-Îles
- Sean Devine – playwright, actor, and politician
- Colleen Dewhurst – actress
- Caroline Dhavernas – actress
- Domenic Di Rosa – actor
- Kadie Karen Diekmeyer – Internet personality and activist
- Céline Dion – singer
- Stéphane Dion – politician
- Christopher DiRaddo – writer
- Xavier Dolan – actor, director, screenwriter, editor, costume director, producer
- Jacob Dolson Cox – U.S. soldier and politician
- Audrey Capel Doray – artist
- Jean Doré – former mayor of Montreal
- Ivan Doroschuk – singer
- Fifi D'Orsay – actress
- Luguentz Dort – NBA Player
- Anne Dorval – actress
- William Dow – brewer
- Jean Drapeau – mayor of Montreal during Expo '67 and the 1976 Olympic Games
- Glen Drover – guitarist for Megadeth
- Shawn Drover – drummer for Megadeth
- Steve Dubinsky – former NHL player
- Gilles Duceppe – politician
- Jean Duceppe – actor
- Louis Dudek – poet
- Chloé Dufour-Lapointe – skier, Olympic medalist
- Justine Dufour-Lapointe – skier, Olympic gold medalist
- Jack Dunham – animator, television commercial producer, designer of the St-Hubert rooster mascot
- Barbara Dunkelman – voice actress for Rooster Teeth
- Alexandre Dupuis – football player
- Laurent Duvernay-Tardif – NFL player, physician

== E ==
- Keith Eaman – Canadian football player
- Henrietta Edwards – women’s rights activist, suffragist
- Iwan Edwards – conductor, Member of the Order of Canada
- Elisapie – singer, broadcaster, activist
- Vic Emery – Olympic bobsleigh gold medalist
- Empire I – pop and dancehall singer, songwriter
- Anke Engelke – German comedian, born in Montreal
- Chad Erickson – Ringette coach
- Angelo Esposito – hockey player
- Sam Etcheverry – former CFL and NFL football quarterback, Montreal Alouettes, St. Louis Cardinals
- Terry Evanshen – former CFL football player, Montreal Alouettes, Calgary Stampeders
- Ken Evoy – founder of Sitesell; creator of SiteBuildIt!

== F ==
- Lara Fabian – operatic singer
- Mylène Farmer – singer
- Leylah Fernandez – tennis player
- David Fennario – playwright
- Greg Fergus – Member of Parliament; 38th Speaker of the House of Commons
- Maynard Ferguson – jazz trumpet player and bandleader
- Marcelle Ferron – painter, stained glass artist
- Denise Filiatrault – actress and director
- Jennifer Finnigan – Hollywood actress
- Sheila Finestone – MP, senator
- Serge Fiori – musician, singer, writer
- Sarah Fischer – operatic soprano
- Marc-André Fleury – NHL goaltender, three-time Stanley Cup champion with the Pittsburgh Penguins
- Louis-Joseph Forget – stockbroker, financier, statesman
- Rodolphe Forget – businessman, politician, philanthropist
- Samuel Fournier – former CFL football player, Montreal Alouettes, Edmonton Eskimos, Hamilton Tiger-Cats
- Kathleen Fox – flight instructor, air traffic controller, business executive
- René-Arthur Fréchet – architect
- Pauline Fréchette – poet, dramatist, journalist, Catholic nun
- Josh Freed – writer, humourist, filmmaker
- David Freiheit – lawyer and YouTuber
- Gottfried Fuchs (1889–1972) – German-Canadian Olympic soccer player

== G ==
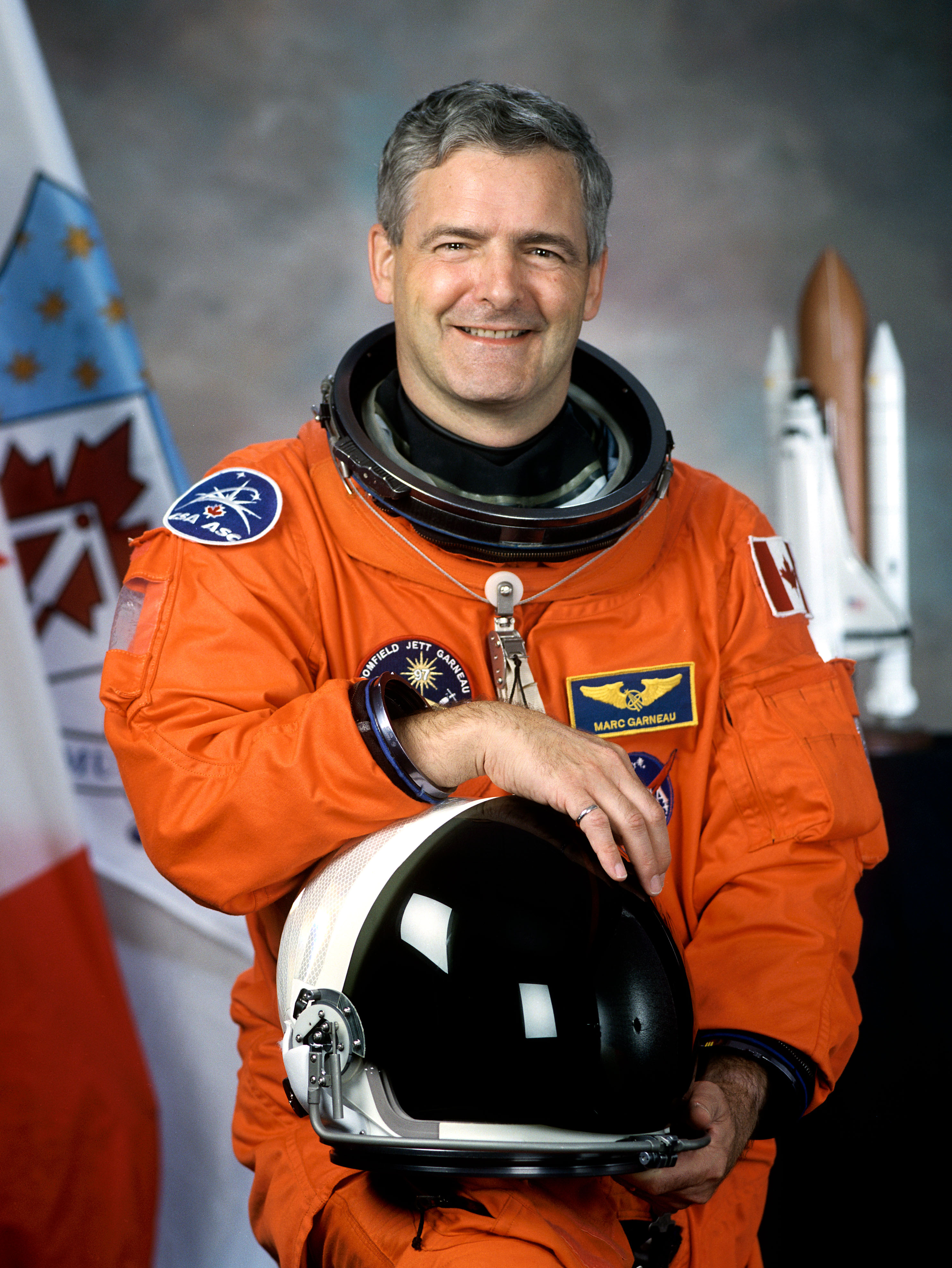
Marc Garneau

- Alfonso Gagliano – politician
- André Gagné – professor and scholar, Concordia University
- Éric Gagné – pitcher, Los Angeles Dodgers, Texas Rangers
- André Gagnon – composer, pianist
- Marc Gagnon – Olympic gold medal speed skater
- Marc-Antoine Gagnon – moguls skier
- Ian Gailer, festival and organization manager
- Howard Galganov – anglophone rights activist, radio personality
- Céline Galipeau – anchorwoman
- Mavis Gallant – author
- Patsy Gallant – pop singer
- Mitch Garber – gaming, hotel executive, philanthropist, broadcaster
- Marc Garneau – astronaut, federal politician, cabinet minister
- Kathleen Gati – actress
- Arturo Gatti – professional boxer, world champion
- Daniel Gauthier – co-founder of the Cirque du Soleil
- James Gelfand – pianist, composer, arranger
- Bernie Geoffrion – hockey player for Montreal Canadiens
- Gettomasa – Finnish rapper; born Aleksi Lehikoinen
- Yasmeen Ghauri – supermodel
- Nicolas Gill – judoka, Olympic medalist
- Ralph Gilles – designer of the Chrysler 300c
- Margie Gillis – dancer, choreographer
- Jessalyn Gilsig – actress
- Jacques Godbout – writer, poet, filmmaker
- Phil Gold – researcher, physician
- Hilda Goldblatt Gorenstein (Hilgos) – artist and inspiration for the documentary I Remember Better When I Paint
- Victor Goldbloom – politician, physician
- Jonathan Goldstein – author, humourist and radio producer
- Anne-France Goldwater – lawyer and TV court show personality
- John Gomery – jurist
- Brian Goodwin – biologist
- Adam Gopnik – writer, essayist
- Charles Blair Gordon (1867–1939) – industrialist and banker, president of Dominion Textile and the Bank of Montreal
- Henry Gordon (1919–2009) – magician, journalist, CSI Fellow
- Huntley Gordon – actor
- Shaul Gordon (born 1994) – Canadian-Israeli Olympic sabre fencer
- Hugh Graham, 1st Baron Atholstan – newspaper publisher
- Stewart Francis Granger – former NBA basketball player
- W. R. Granger (William Rowen Granger) – president of the Montreal AAA, Canadian and Quebec Amateur Hockey Associations
- Howard Grant – former Canadian Olympics and Commonwealth boxer; trainer, UFC welterweight champion, Georges St-Pierre
- Otis Grant – Jamaican-born former WBO Middleweight boxing champion
- Hulda Regina Graser – customs house broker
- Harold Greenberg – movie producer, founder of Astral Media
- Frank Greenleaf – president of the Canadian and Quebec Amateur Hockey Associations
- Sylvain Grenier – WWE wrestler
- Irving Grundman – businessman, hockey executive
- Geneviève Guérard – ballerina
- Vladimir Guerrero Jr. – MLB for the Toronto Blue Jays
- Quincy Guerrier – college basketball player for the Oregon Ducks
- Philip Guston – painter and printmaker

== H ==
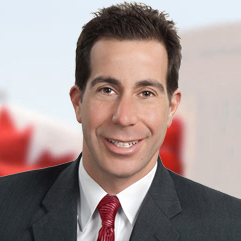
Anthony Housefather

- Dayle Haddon – model and actress
- Marc-André Hamelin – pianist and composer
- Emily Hampshire – actress
- Chris Haney – co-inventor of Trivial Pursuit
- Dan Hanganu – architect
- Louise Harel – politician
- Corey Hart – singer
- Doug Harvey – Hall of Fame ice hockey player
- Moshe Hauer – Modern Orthodox rabbi
- Jacques Hébert – statesman
- Thomas Hellman – pop singer
- Carl Henry – singer
- Prudence Heward – Beaver Hall Group artist
- Émilie Heymans – diver, Olympic medalist
- Alonzo Highsmith – former NFL football player
- Dave Hilton, Jr. – world champion boxer
- Matthew Hilton – world champion boxer
- William Hales Hingston – mayor of Montreal, senator, physician
- David Julian Hirsh – actor
- Ian Hodgkinson – professional wrestler, lived in Montreal while in WCW
- Thomas William Holmes – winner of the Victoria Cross
- Herbert Samuel Holt – financier
- Steve Holt – jazz pianist, AC singer-songwriter
- William Hope – actor
- Anna Hopkins – actress
- Camillien Houde – former mayor of Montreal
- Alice Houghton – broker
- Anthony Housefather – member of Canadian Parliament
- Chuck Hughes (chef) – celebrity chef, restaurateur, television personality
- Kent Hughes – hockey executive

== I ==
- Norman Iceberg – singer-songwriter

- Indie Indie – Montreal alternative dream pop duo with Patrick Fournier and Rémi Cormier

== J ==
- A. Y. Jackson – artist, member of the Group of Seven
- Claude Jasmin – novelist and screen writer
- Édouard Jasmin – ceramic artist
- Louis Jaque, modernist painter
- Marlene Jennings – politician
- René Jodoin – film animator and producer
- Daniel Johnson, Jr. – former Liberal premier of Quebec
- Pierre Marc Johnson – former PQ premier of Quebec
- Mélanie Joly – politician
- Oliver Jones – jazz pianist
- Sass Jordan – singer
- Kris Joseph – basketball player
- Robert Joy – actor
- Alexander Julien – musician, member of Vision Eternel
- Pierre Juneau – film and broadcasting executive
- Claude Jutra – filmmaker

== K ==
- Emilie Kahn – musician also known as Emilie & Ogden
- Garry Kallos – wrestler and sambo competitor
- Tommy Kane – former NFL football player, Seattle Seahawks
- Daniel Kash – actor
- Nicholas Kasirer – supreme court justice
- Victoria Kaspi – astrophysicist and McGill professor
- Naïm Kattan – author, essayist
- Kenneth Kaushansky – Dean of the Stony Brook University School of Medicine, hematologist, Master of the American College of Physicians
- Kaytranada – electronic musician, producer, DJ
- Michael A. Kelen – former judge of the Federal Court of Canada
- George Kennedy – owner of Montreal Canadiens hockey team
- Amir Khadir – physician and politician
- Marie-Claire Kirkland-Casgrain – politician, judge
- Franklin Kiermyer – drummer, composer, bandleader
- Andy Kim – singer-songwriter
- A. M. Klein – poet, author
- Naomi Klein – author and activist
- Otto Klineberg – psychologist; scholar
- Kid Koala – DJ
- Leo Kolber – senator, businessman
- Benjamin Kowalewicz – singer of Billy Talent
- Vanessa Kraven – professional wrestler
- David Kristian – electronic musician
- Sid and Marty Krofft – producers/creators of H.R. Pufnstuf, The Bugaloos, Sigmund and the Sea Monsters, Land of the Lost, The Lost Saucer
- Joseph Kruger – founder of Kruger Inc.

== L ==
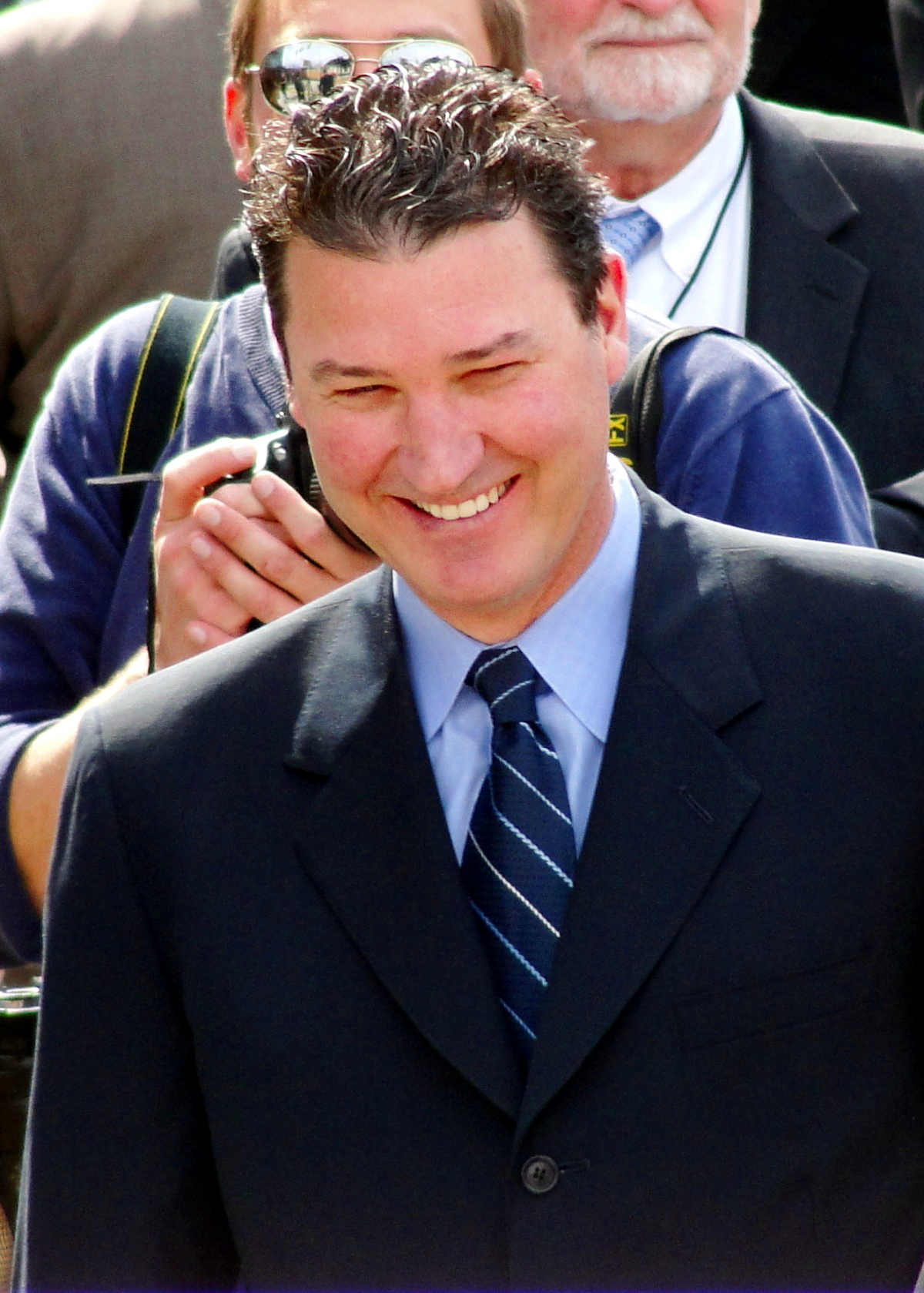
Mario Lemieux

- Florence La Badie – actress
- Charline Labonté – hockey player, Canadian Olympic women's team, gold medalist in 2006, 2010, 2014
- Elmer Lach – NHL player, Hall of Famer
- Michel Maray de La Chauvignerie – 18th century French military officer and interpreter
- Daniel Langlois – businessman, producer
- Hubert Lacroix – CBC president and CEO
- Oleg Ladik – Olympic wrestler
- Dany Laferrière – author
- Guy Lafleur – NHL player, Montreal Canadiens
- Alexis Lafrenière – NHL player, New York Rangers
- François Legault – businessman, politician, premier of Québec
- Corky Laing – musician
- Jon Lajoie – comedian
- Guy Laliberté – founder and CEO of Cirque de Soleil
- Pierre Lalonde – singer, tv host
- Paul Lambert – left guard, Montreal Alouettes
- Phyllis Lambert – architect and member of the Bronfman family
- Mado Lamotte – drag queen and author
- Jacques Lanctôt – FLQ member, convicted terrorist
- Louise Lanctôt – FLQ member, convicted terrorist
- Edmond Lapierre – former MPP
- Jean Lapierre – politician, broadcaster
- Éric Lapointe – CFL running back for the Montreal Alouettes
- Pierre Laporte – politician
- Georges Laraque – NHL player
- Ryan Larkin – animator
- Pat Larochelle – professional ice hockey player
- Ricardo Larrivée – chef, tv host, cookbook author, businessman
- Nicholas Latifi – Former Driver for Williams Racing During the 2020 & 2021 Formula One Season
- Zoé Laurier – wife of Sir Wilfrid Laurier
- Lisa Lavie – singer-songwriter
- Irving Layton – poet, essayist, short story writer
- Jack Layton – politician, leader of the federal New Democratic Party
- Irina Lăzăreanu – fashion model
- La Zarra – singer-songwriter
- Charlotte Le Bon – actress
- Louise Lecavalier – dancer
- Vincent Lecavalier – NHL player
- Fernand Leduc – painter
- Jos LeDuc – professional wrestler
- Ranee Lee – jazz singer
- Sébastien Lefebvre – guitarist of Simple Plan and vocalist
- Alain Lefèvre – pianist and composer
- Rachelle Lefevre – actress
- Jean Leloup – musician
- Jean Paul Lemieux – painter
- Mario Lemieux (born 1965) – NHL player
- Vanessa Lengies – actress
- Guy A. Lepage – television personality
- Marc Lépine – mass murderer
- René Lépine – real-estate developer
- Chris Leroux – MLB pitcher (Florida Marlins, Pittsburgh Pirates)
- Pierre Leroux – novelist, journalist and screenwriter
- Jean Lesage – lawyer, politician
- Kris Letang – QMJHL player, NHL player, three-time Stanley Cup champion with the Pittsburgh Penguins
- André Éric Létourneau – intermedia artist, composer
- Jean-Louis Lévesque – stockbroker, horse racing builder
- Devon Levi – goaltender drafted by Florida Panthers in the 7th round, 212th overall in the 2020 NHL entry draft, current Northeastern Huskies, Canada men's national junior ice hockey team
- Shawn Levy – director and actor
- David Lewis (Canadian politician) – NDP leader
- Marilyn Lightstone – actress
- Jaclyn Linetsky – actress
- David Lipper – actor
- Arthur Lismer – painter, member of the Group of Seven
- Liu Fang – musician
- Pascal Lochard – CFL player
- Édouard Lock – choreographer
- William Edmond Logan – geologist
- Jennifer Lonergan – educator, nonprofit executive, promoter of third-world women's craftmanship
- Loud (rapper) – rapper, songwriter
- Colin Low – filmmaker
- Luba (singer) – recording artist
- Lunice – musician
- Roberto Luongo – NHL goaltender
- Yves A. Lussier – physician-scientist in translational bioinformatics
- John Goodwin Lyman – modernist painter

== M ==
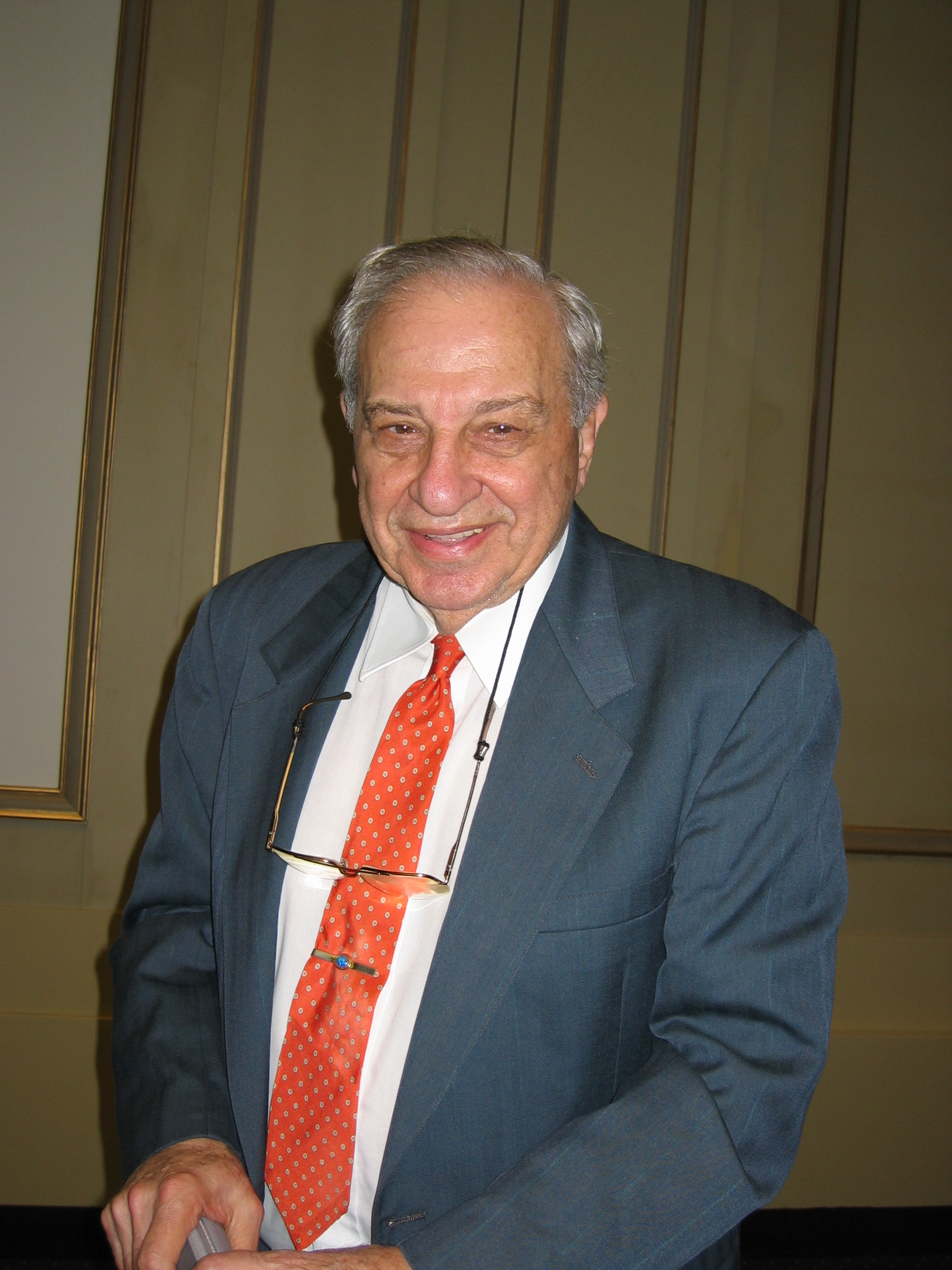
Rudolph A. Marcus

- Tom Maayan (born 1993) – Canada-born Israeli basketball player in the Israeli National League
- L. Ian MacDonald (born 1947) – author, columnist, broadcaster, and diplomat
- William C. Macdonald – tobacco manufacturer, philanthropist
- Danny Maciocia – CFL football coach
- Don Macpherson – journalist
- Nicolas Macrozonaris – sprinter, track and field
- Arnaud Maggs – artist, photographer
- André Major – author
- Sean Patrick Maloney – Canadian-American politician and U.S. Representative for the state of New York since 2013
- Jeanne Mance – founder of first hospital in North America, l'Hôtel-Dieu de Montréal, 1645
- Frederic Marcotte – poet and musician
- Rudolph A. Marcus – Nobel laureate of chemistry
- Lou Marinoff – philosopher at City College of New York
- Yann Martel – writer, Man Booker Prize 2002
- Paul Martin – former prime minister of Canada
- Russell Martin – baseball player for the Toronto Blue Jays
- Massari – singer
- Mike Matheson – NHL player for the Montreal Canadiens
- Bennedict Mathurin – NBA player
- Charles Mayer – journalist, sportsperson and politician
- John McCallum – politician
- John Wilson McConnell – businessman, publisher, philanthropist
- David Ross McCord – lawyer, philanthropist
- Kevin McDonald – actor/comedian/voice actor, member of The Kids in the Hall
- Anna McGarrigle – singer, songwriter
- Kate McGarrigle – singer, songwriter
- Thomas D'Arcy McGee – politician
- Molly McGlynn – film and television director and screenwriter
- Ken McGoogan – writer
- Don McGowan – CFCF television personality
- Duncan McIntyre – businessman
- Scott McKay – former city counsellor and leader of the Green Party of Quebec
- Patricia McKenzie – actress
- Norman McLaren – film animation pioneer
- Stuart McLean – humourist, broadcaster
- Simon McTavish – businessman
- Ronald Melzack – psychologist, professor
- Juan Mendez – former NCAA basketball player, Niagara University
- Monique Mercure – actress
- Charles Meredith – president of the Montreal Stock Exchange
- Frederick Edmund Meredith – lawyer, chancellor of Bishop's University
- Vincent Meredith – first and last Baronet of Montreal; president of the Bank of Montreal
- William Collis Meredith – Chief Justice of the Superior Court of Quebec
- Luck Mervil – singer, actor
- Dieu-Merci Michel – soccer player
- Jim Miller – Canadian football player
- Marc Miller – politician
- Robert Miller – businessman, founder of Future Electronics
- Brenda Milner – neuropsychologist
- Guido Molinari – painter
- Andrew Molson – businessman, member of the Molson family, eldest son of Eric Molson
- Eric Molson – brewer, businessman, member of the Molson family
- Geoff Molson – businessman, member of the Molson family, son of Eric Molson
- Hartland Molson – brewer, World War II fighter pilot, statesman, member of the Molson family
- John Molson – brewer, railway and steamship line builder, member of the Molson family
- Percival Molson – athlete, soldier, member of the Molson family
- Robert Moncel – commander of the 4th Canadian Armoured Brigade in the Second World War
- Raymond de Montmorency – recipient of the Victoria Cross
- Édouard Montpetit – lawyer, economist, academic
- Dickie Moore (ice hockey) – NHL player, Hall of Famer
- Erdem Moralıoğlu – fashion designer
- Henry Morgan – department store founder
- Henry Morgentaler – physician, advocate for women's rights to abortion
- Marjolène Morin – singer
- James Wilson Morrice – landscape artist
- Terry Mosher – editorial cartoonist
- Ben Mulroney – television host; son of Brian Mulroney
- Brian Mulroney – former prime minister of Canada
- Caroline Mulroney – politician
- Mila Mulroney – wife of the 18th prime minister of Canada, Brian Mulroney

== N ==
- Ruba Nadda – producer
- Pierre Nadeau – journalist, television presenter and producer
- Narcy – hip hop artist
- Émile Nelligan – poet
- Sophie Nélisse – actress
- Hillel Neuer – human rights lawyer, executive director UN Watch
- Yannick Nézet-Séguin – conductor
- Kai Nielsen – naturalist philosopher at Concordia University
- Craig Norman – head basketball coach of McGill University Redmen; former basketball player for Concordia University
- Aldo Nova – singer, musician, producer

== O ==
- Edmund Bailey O'Callaghan – politician, Parti patriote member
- Alexander Walker Ogilvie – miller, statesman
- Leo Ognall – crime novelist known by pen names Hartley Howard and Harry Carmichael
- Heather O'Neill – author
- Erin O'Toole – politician, Conservative Party of Canada member
- Maryse Ouellet – glamour model and former WWE wrestler
- Caroline Ouellette – hockey player, Canadian women's Olympic team, gold medalist in 2002 and 2006

== P ==
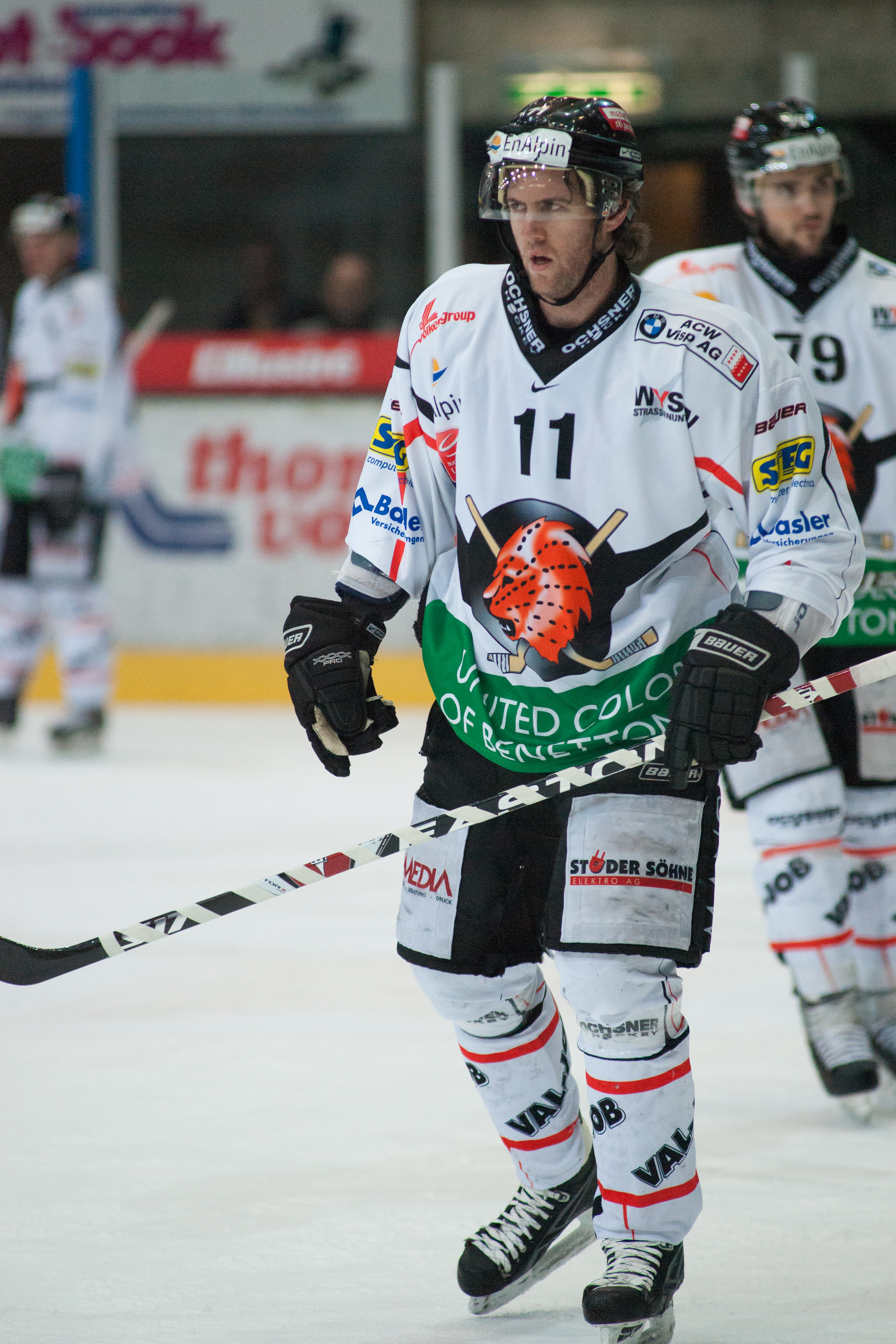
Cory Pecker

- P. Reign – hip hop artist, born in Montreal, raised in Toronto
- Frank L. Packard – novelist
- Michel Pagliaro – musician
- Vernon Pahl – Canadian football player
- Jean Jacques Paradis – Commander of the Canadian Army
- Jessica Paré – actress
- Jacques Parizeau – politician, former premier of Quebec
- Julie Payette – astronaut, governor general
- Trevor W. Payne – founder and music director of the Montreal Jubilation Gospel Choir
- Cory Pecker (born 1981) – hockey player, right wing (EHC Visp)
- Érik Péladeau – businessman (Québecor)
- Pierre Péladeau – founder of Quebecor
- Pierre Karl Péladeau – CEO of Quebecor Media
- Alfred Pellan – painter
- Gérard Pelletier – journalist and politician
- Wilfrid Pelletier – symphony conductor
- Dr. Wilder Penfield – pioneering neurosurgeon, founder of the Montreal Neurological Institute
- Louise Penny – broadcaster, author
- David De La Peralle – football player
- Missy Peregrym – actress
- Oscar Peterson – jazz pianist
- Autumn Phillips – former wife of Peter Phillips, eldest grandchild of Queen Elizabeth II
- Mary Pierce – tennis player
- André Pijet – artist
- Daniel Pilon – actor
- Donald Pilon – actor
- Steven Pinker – linguist and evolutionary psychologist
- Susan Pinker – journalist and psychologist
- Valérie Plante – mayor of Montreal
- Christopher Plummer – actor
- Judes Poirier – university professor
- Camille Poliquin – musician
- Antoni Porowski – chef, actor, and television personality
- Dick Pound – lawyer, Olympic Games executive
- Cheryl Pounder – hockey player, Canadian Olympic women's team, gold medalist in 2002 and 2006
- André Pratte – journalist, economist
- Olivier-Maxence Prosper – NBA player

== Q ==
- Nathalie Quagliotto – visual artist
- Sara Quin – musician

== R ==
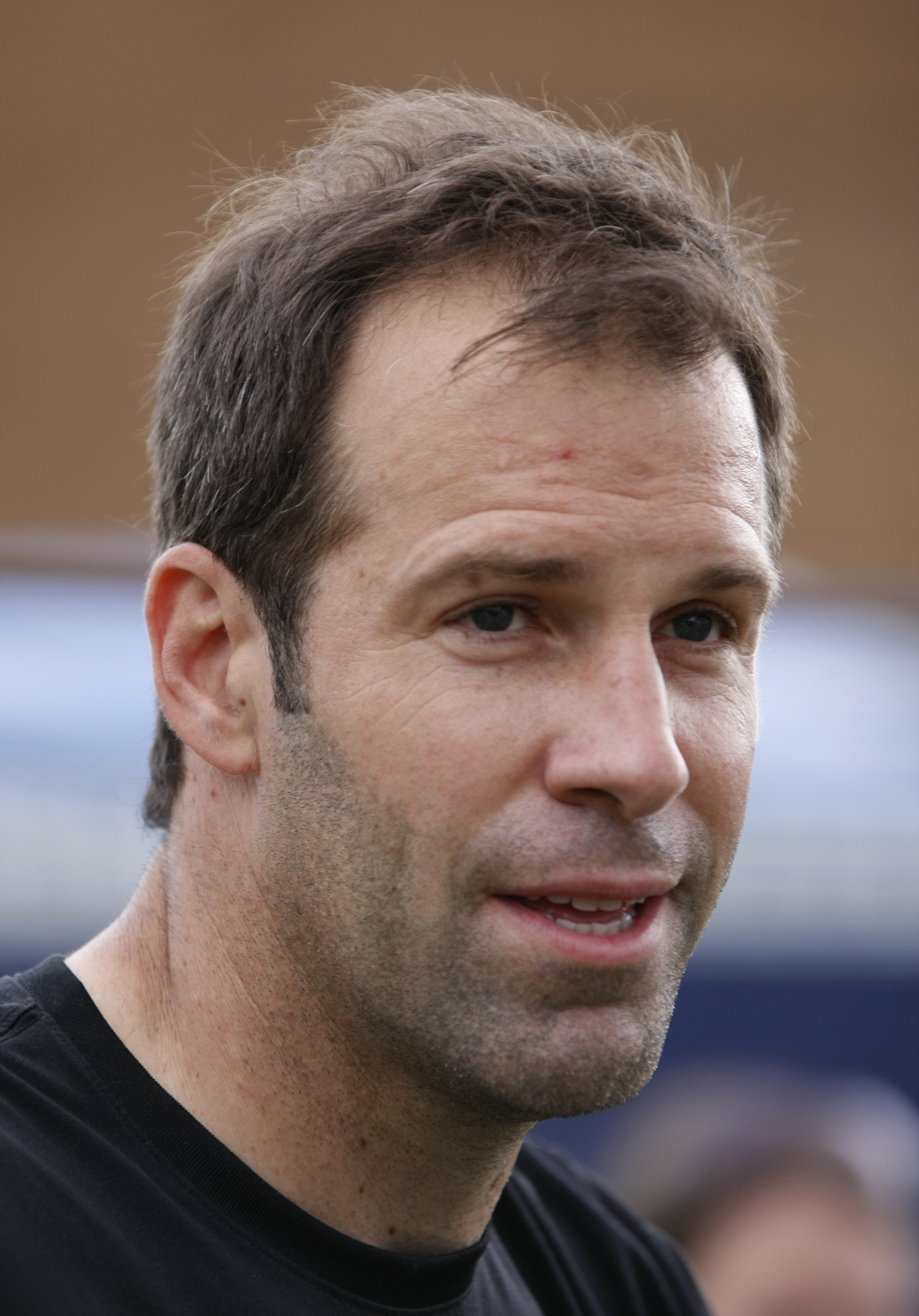
Greg Rusedski

- Zotique Racicot – auxiliary bishop of Montreal from 1905 to 1915
- David Rakoff – humourist, essayist, poet
- Jesse Rath (born 1989) – actor
- Meaghan Rath – actress
- Claude Raymond – baseball player and coach
- Jade Raymond – video game designer and producer
- John Redpath – businessman, philanthropist
- Hubert Reeves – astrophysicist
- Eliza Ann McIntosh Reid – social reformer, women’s rights activist
- Heather Reisman – businesswoman
- Jason Reitman – filmmaker
- Ginette Reno – singer
- Caroline Rhea – actress
- Mike Ribeiro – NHL player
- Henri Richard – NHL player
- Maurice Richard – NHL player
- Mordecai Richler – writer
- Nancy Richler – novelist
- Helen Richmond Young Reid – social worker
- Jean-Paul Riopelle – painter, sculptor
- Olivier Rioux – basketball player
- Vito Rizzuto – mobster, mafia boss
- Léa Roback – trade union organizer, activist
- Alphonso Theodore Roberts – political activist, cricketer
- Sam Roberts – musician, singer
- Marc Robillard – musician, composer and songwriter
- Braulio Rocha – photographer
- Percy Rodrigues – actor
- Sasha Roiz – actor
- Cristina Rosato – actress
- Fred Rose – trade union organiser, politician
- Paul Rose – terrorist, political figure
- Ari Rosenberg – basketball player
- Ethel Rosenfield – sculptor
- Charlie J. Ross – vaudeville performer
- J.K.L. Ross – racehorse owner, philanthropist
- Allan Roth – baseball statistician for the Brooklyn/Los Angeles Dodgers
- Patrice Roy – news anchor
- Albert S. Ruddy – film and television producer, known for producing The Godfather and Million Dollar Baby, which won him two Academy Awards for Best Picture
- Greg Rusedski – tennis player
- Allison Russell – singer, songwriter
- Claude Ryan – publisher, politician
- Frank "Dunie" Ryan – mobster

== S ==
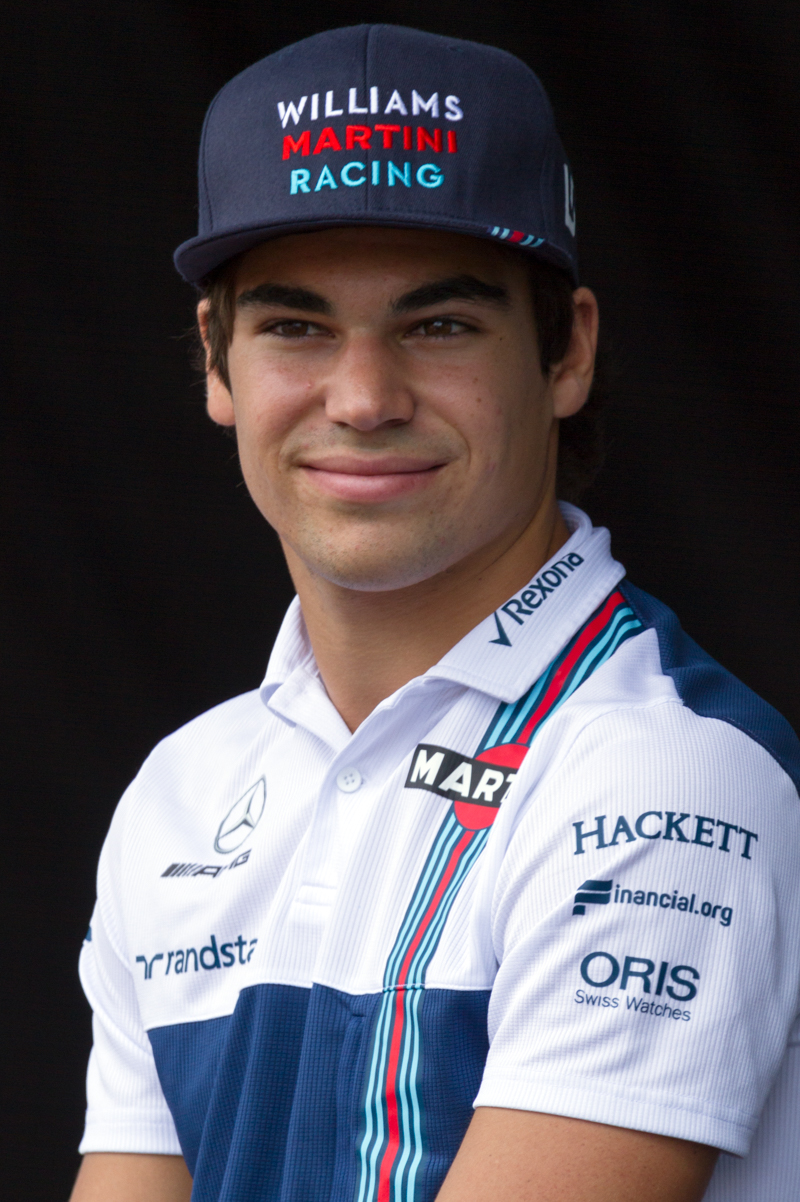
Lance Stroll

- Gad Saad (born 1964) - Lebanese-born Jewish Canadian evolutionary behavioral scientist
- Roméo Sabourin – SOE agent, World War II hero executed by the Nazis
- Moshe Safdie – architect, urban designer
- Peter Sagar – musician
- Idola Saint-Jean – journalist, educator, feminist
- Benjamin St-Juste – American football player
- Martin St. Louis – NHL player
- Georges St-Pierre – professional MMA fighter
- Kim St-Pierre – hockey goaltender, Canadian Olympic women's team
- Sugar Sammy – stand-up comedian
- Lino Saputo – billionaire businessman
- Jeanne Sauvé – 23rd governor general of Canada
- Serge Savard – NHL player
- Anne Savage – artist
- Derek Seguin – comic
- Marco Scandella – NHL player
- Arnold Scaasi – fashion designer
- Aliocha Schneider – singer, actor
- Paul Schoeffler – voice actor, actor
- Seymour Schulich – businessman, philanthropist
- Joseph A. Schwarcz – professor of chemistry at McGill University
- Cynthia Scott – Academy Award-winning director
- Frank Scott – scholar, poet, professor, lawyer
- Francis Alexander Caron Scrimger – winner of the Victoria Cross in World War I
- Mark Shainblum – comic book writer and co-creator of Northguard
- Marla Shapiro – CTV medical reporter and physician
- Omar Sharif Jr. – actor, author, activist
- William Shatner – actor, best known for playing Captain Kirk in Star Trek
- Douglas Shearer – Academy Award-winning motion picture sound engineer
- Norma Shearer – Academy Award-winning actress
- Eliezer Sherbatov – Canadian-Israeli ice hockey player
- Madeleine Sherwood – actress, played Mother Superior in The Flying Nun
- Nathan Simeon – soccer player
- Sir George Simpson – explorer, governor of HBC
- Karen Simpson – actress and fashion designer
- Jaspreet Singh – author
- Charles Sirois – telecommunications
- David Six – artist
- Skiifall – rapper
- Jeff Skoll – Internet entrepreneur
- Donald Smith – railway executive
- George M. Smith – Lieutenant Governor of Wisconsin
- Larry Smith – former CFL football player; former president of the Montreal Alouettes
- Nahum Sonenberg – biochemist, professor at McGill University
- Wonny Song – classical concert pianist
- Kwasi Songui – actor
- Alex Soria – singer-guitarist (The Nils, Chino)
- Peter Stearns – historian, honorary knight
- H. Arnold Steinberg – businessman, philanthropist, chancellor of McGill University
- Sam Steinberg – supermarket founder
- Tobie Steinhouse – artist
- Ralph M. Steinman – 2011 Nobel laureate in Physiology or Medicine
- George Stephen – banker, railway executive
- Jeff Stinco – lead guitarist of Simple Plan
- P.J. Stock – NHL player, broadcaster
- Lance Stroll – Formula One racing driver
- Lawrence Stroll – billionaire businessman, major shareholder/executive chairman in Aston Martin and father to Formula One driver Lance Stroll
- Howard Stupp – Olympic wrestler
- Bruny Surin – track and field athlete
- Daisy Sweeney – pianist, music teacher
- Robert Augustus Sweeney – only African American double recipient of the American Medal of Honor
- Sylvia Sweeney – former basketball player for the Canadian women's national team; TV journalist
- Jack W. Szostak – Nobel Laureate in Physiology or Medicine
- Stacey Ryan – singer and songwriter

== T ==
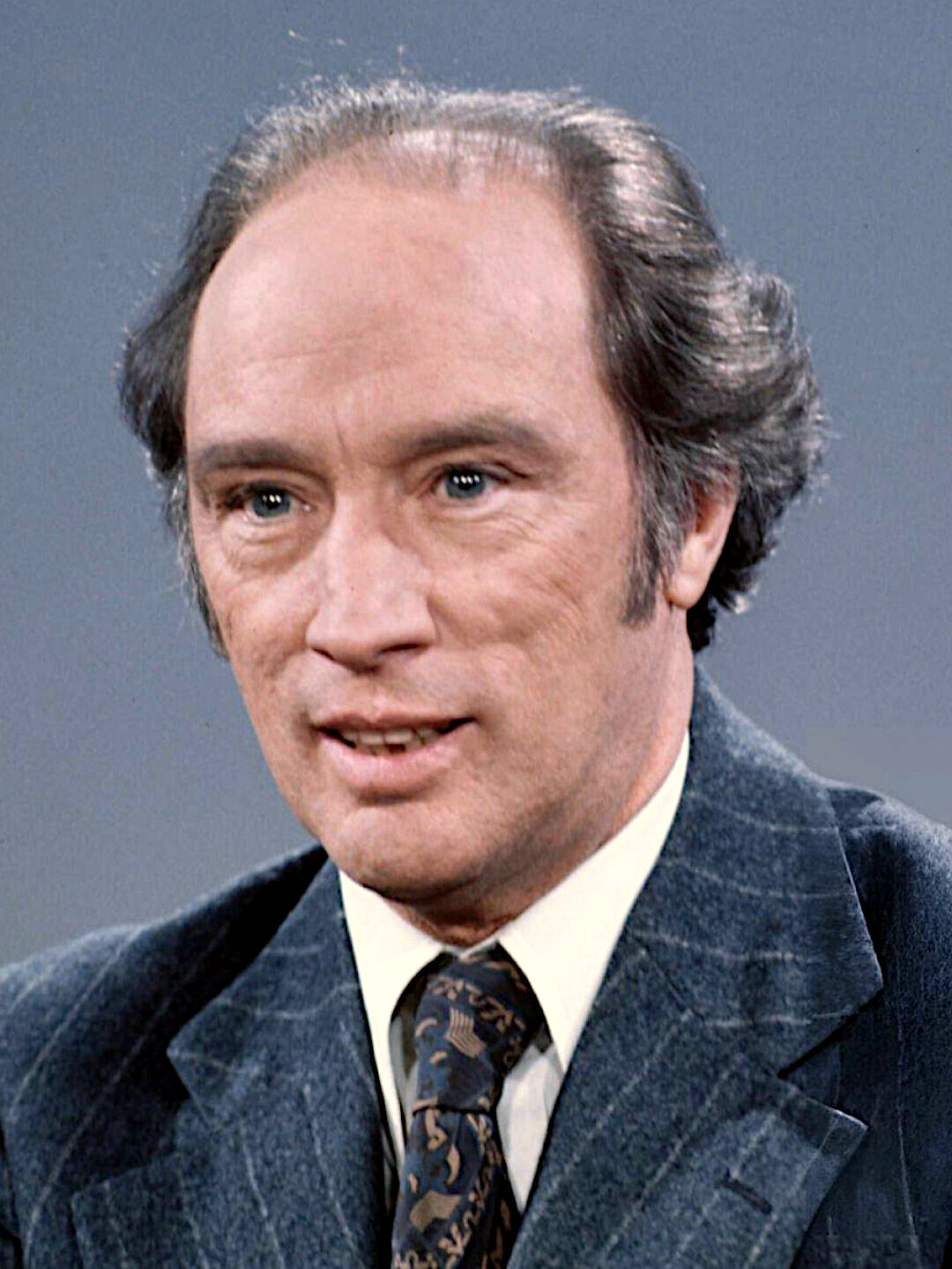
Pierre Trudeau

- Mutsumi Takahashi – journalist
- Maxime Talbot – NHL player
- Ari Taub – Olympic Greco-Roman wrestler
- Charles Taylor – philosopher emeritus at McGill
- Lucille Teasdale-Corti – physician, humanitarian
- Iro Tembeck – ballet dancer, choreographer, teacher
- José Théodore – NHL player
- David Thompson – explorer
- Ryan Thorne – head basketball coach for the McGill Martlets, former CIAU champion in basketball with Bishop's University
- Kim Thúy – author
- Jacob Tierney – actor, director, screenwriter, producer
- Kevin Tierney – movie producer
- Tiga – electronic musician, singer, DJ
- Josh Tordjman – NHL player
- Ibrahim Tounkara – Canadian football player
- Daniel Tracey – journalist, politician
- Gérald Tremblay – former mayor of Montreal
- Michel Tremblay – novelist, playwright
- Tony Tremblay – poet, radio personality
- Clem Trihey – professional ice hockey player
- Lorne Trottier – businessman, philanthropist
- Alexandre Trudeau – journalist; son of Pierre Trudeau, the former prime minister of Canada
- Justin Trudeau – 23rd prime minister of Canada, son of Pierre Trudeau, a former prime minister of Canada
- Pierre Trudeau – 15th prime minister of Canada
- Sophie Grégoire Trudeau – former spouse of the 23rd prime minister of Canada, Justin Trudeau
- Yves Trudeau (biker) – contract killer, gangster
- Alain Trudel – conductor
- Yanic Truesdale – actor
- Jean-Claude Turcotte – Roman Catholic cardinal
- Roxane Turcotte – author of children's and youth literature
- George Tutunjian – performer of Armenian revolutionary songs
- Rachel Tyndale – pharmacogeneticist
- Venus Terzo - Voice Actress And Actress

== U ==
- David Usher – singer-songwriter

== V ==
- Maurice Vachon – also known as Mad Dog Vachon; wrestling champion
- Armand Vaillancourt – sculptor
- Stevie Vallance – also known as Louise Vallance; singer, musician, actress, voice actress and director
- Jean-Marc Vallée – filmmaker
- Karine Vanasse – actress, tv host
- Todd van der Heyden – journalist, news anchor
- Ernie Vandeweghe – former NBA basketball player, New York Knicks
- Georges Vanier – governor general
- Gino Vannelli – singer-songwriter
- Chris Velan – singer-songwriter
- Joe Veleno – NHL prospect for the Detroit Red Wings
- Jacques Vieau – fur trader and early Wisconsin settler
- Denis Villeneuve – filmmaker
- Gilles Villeneuve – Formula One driver
- Jacques Villeneuve – Formula One driver (1997 World Champion); 1995 IndyCar champion; son of Gilles Villeneuve
- Claude Vivier – contemporary classical composer, ethnomusicologist and poet
- Marc-Édouard Vlasic – NHL player, currently playing for the San Jose Sharks
- Roch Voisine – singer
- Caroline Vu - novelist

== W ==
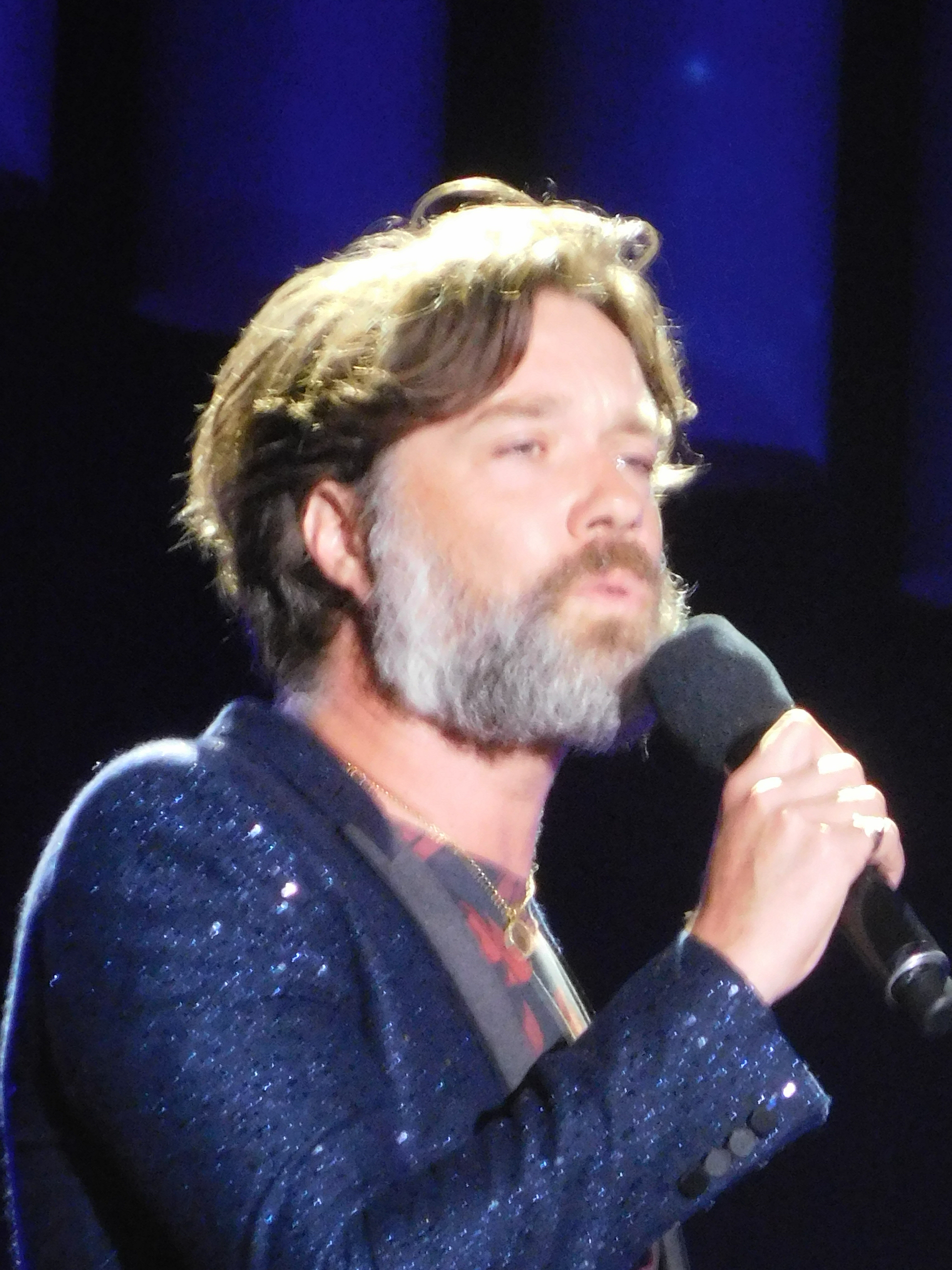
Rufus Wainwright

- Eleanor Wachtel – writer and broadcaster
- Richard Wagner – Chief Justice of Canada
- Mark Wainberg – AIDS researcher
- Martha Wainwright – singer-songwriter
- Rufus Wainwright – singer-songwriter
- Avi Wallerstein – ophthalmologist, co-founder of LASIK MD
- Amanda Walsh – actress
- Dwight Walton – professional basketball player, Canadian Olympian
- Andrew Walker – actor, film producer
- Patrick Watson – singer-songwriter
- Ben Weider – co-founder of the IFBB (International Federation of BodyBuilders)
- Joe Weider – creator of the Mr. Olympia and Ms. Olympia bodybuilding contests
- William Weintraub – author, filmmaker
- Danny Wells – actor; played bartender on The Jeffersons and Luigi in The Super Mario Brothers Super Show
- Bill Wennington – former NBA basketball player, Chicago Bulls
- Max Werner – founder of Montreal Pastry, world class pastry chef
- Esther Wertheimer – sculptor and educator
- Alissa White-Gluz – singer-songwriter; former vocalist of The Agonist; current vocalist of Arch Enemy
- Trevor C. Williams – former member of the Canadian national basketball team; philanthropist
- Cairine Wilson – first woman to serve in the Senate of Canada
- Joseph Wiseman – actor, known for playing Dr. Julius No in the first James Bond film Dr. No
- Karl Wolf – singer
- Bernie Wolfe (born 1951) – NHL hockey player
- William Workman – businessman and municipal politician
- Peter Worrell – former NHL player
- Aleksandra Wozniak – tennis player

== X ==
- Xue Yiwei – writer – Côte-des-Neiges

== Y ==
- Joel Yanofsky – writer
- Nikki Yanofsky – jazz singer
- Wayne Yearwood – former professional basketball player; Canadian Olympian

== Z ==
- Sami Zayn – professional wrestler currently signed to the WWE
- Larry "Rock" Zeidel (1928–2014) – NHL player
- Joel Zifkin – electric violinist, singer-songwriter
- David Zilberman – Olympic heavyweight wrestler
- Moses Znaimer – co-founder of Toronto's CityTV
- Nathan Zsombor-Murray – diver, Olympic medalist
- Mortimer Zuckerman – magazine editor, publisher, real estate tycoon

== See also ==
- List of people from British Columbia
- List of people from Calgary
- List of people from Edmonton
- List of people from Laval, Quebec
- List of people from Ontario
- List of people from Quebec
- List of people from Quebec City
- List of people from Toronto
- List of people from Vancouver
