= David Six =

David Six may refer to:

- David Six (musician) (born 1985), Austrian pianist, composer and multi-instrumentalist
- David Six (artist) (born 1968), Canadian artist
- David Six (basketball)
