= Marcotte =

Marcotte is a surname of French origin originally relating to viticulture.

- Amanda Marcotte (born 1977), American blogger
- Arthur Marcotte (1873–1958), Canadian lawyer and political figure
- Bruno Marcotte (born 1974), Canadian figure skater and coach
- Charles Marcotte (1844–1901), Canadian notary and political figure
- Danielle Marcotte (born 1950), Canadian writer
- Don Marcotte (born 1947), Canadian ice hockey player
- Edward Marcotte, American professor of biochemistry
- Élise Marcotte (born 1988), Canadian synchronised swimmer
- Eric Marcotte (born 1980), American cyclist
- Félix Marcotte (1865–1953), French sailor
- Fernand Marcotte, Canadian boxer
- François Arthur Marcotte (1866–1931), Canadian physician and political figure
- Frederic Marcotte (born 1975), poet
- Jacques Marcotte, Canadian politician
- Joanne Marcotte, Canadian political activist
- Julien G. Marcotte, Canadian filmmaker
- Kaylin Marcotte, American businesswoman
- Marie Antoinette Marcotte (1867–1929), French painter
- Michael Marcotte (born 1958), American politician
- Michèle Marcotte, Canadian food scientist
- Paul Marcotte (1928–2012), American politician
- Paul Marcotte (musician), Canadian musician
- Pierre-Léandre Marcotte (1837–1899), Canadian farmer and political figure
- Sophie Bédard Marcotte, Canadian director
- Vanessa Marcotte (1989–2016), American murder victim
