= Ryan Thorne =

Canadian basketball coach (born 1971)

Ryan Thorne (born 1971 in Montreal, Quebec) is the current head basketball coach of the McGill Redbirds basketball team, in Montreal, since the 2021-2022 season. Prior to that he was the head coach of the McGill Martlets basketball team from 2002 to 2021.

== Biography ==
He grew up in LaSalle, Quebec, where he learned to play basketball and polish his game at Ouellette Park, a basketball court that was a hotbed for basketball talent coming out of, not only the city of LaSalle but of Montréal as well. He was a basketball star while attending high school at Argyle Academy, in Verdun, Quebec. After high school, he went on to star, and become an All-Canadian basketball stand out at John Abbott College in Sainte-Anne-de-Bellevue, on Montréal's West Island. At John Abbott College, he was also the team captain and team MVP. He was heavily recruited by all the major universities in Québec, including some Division II NCAA colleges in the United States. He opted to attend Bishop's University, in Lennoxville, Quebec, where again he achieved All-Canadian honours and won a National CIAU (now CIS) Championship, as well as team MVP, and was team captain. His brother Adrian played football at the University of Waterloo, in Waterloo, Ontario.

== See also ==
- List of people from Montreal
