= Balance: Television for Living Well =

Canadian television series

Balance: Television for Living Well was a Canadian television series, which aired on CTV beginning in 2004. Hosted by Dr Marla Shapiro, the program was a daily magazine-style talk show on health and lifestyle issues such as physical fitness, nutrition and physical and mental health. It was aired on the main CTV network daily for four years. Approximately 280 episodes were produced. The series was also sold internationally and had second-tier airing on the One specialty channel.

The series was produced for CTV by S&S Productions, executive produced by Jordan Schwartz (CTV) and David Smith (S&S Productions). Supervising Producer was Rosemary Vukmanich.
