= Marla Shapiro =

Canadian medical doctor

Marla Shapiro CM, is a Canadian medical doctor, best known as a health journalist for CTV News Channel and formerlyThe Globe and Mail. Her reports on health and medical issues have also aired on Canada AM and on CTV's daytime talk show Balance: Television for Living Well. She is seen regularly on CTV News Channel.

Born in Montreal, Quebec, she is a graduate of McGill University and a professor in the Department of Family and Community Medicine at the University of Toronto. Shapiro is also the founding editor of ParentsCanada magazine. She was diagnosed with breast cancer in 2004 and was featured in a television special about her experience. She is the author of Life in the Balance: My Journey with Breast Cancer (HarperCollins Publishers, 2006).

She was named a Member of the Order of Canada in 2015.

== Career highlights ==
2013 – Bayer 150 Outstanding Physician Women's Health and Contraception

2011 – Named a Woman Of Action by Israeli Cancer Research Foundation

2010 – Recipient of the 2010 Peter R. Newman Humanitarian Award

2008 – Recipient of Award of Excellence from the College of Family Physicians of Canada for her lifelong commitment and dedication to family medicine

2008 – Awarded the Excellence in Creative Professional Activity in 2008 by the University of Toronto, Department of Family and Community Medicine

2006 – Winner of Canadian Foundation for Women’s Health Award for Excellence in Women’s Health Journalism (Run Your Own Race)

2005 – Recipient of the 2005 Media Award from the North American Menopause Society for her work in expanding the understanding of menopause
