= Ethel Rosenfield =

Canadian sculptor

- Born: 1910; Kodoc, Poland
- Died: 2000 (aged 89–90); Scarborough, Ontario
- Education: École des beaux-arts de Montréal
- Occupation: Sculptor

Ethel Rosenfield (1910 – 2000) was a Polish-born Canadian sculptor who lived in Montreal, Quebec. After enrolling in art classes in her mid-forties, she began working primarily in limestone and marble, exploring "organic forms, abstract or schematized, the latter representing faces and female bodies". Rosenfield co-founded the Quebec Sculptors' Association in 1962, and her work was exhibited at the Rodin Museum, Expo 67, the Montreal Museum of Fine Arts, and multiple Canadian universities. Her sculptures are held in permanent collections at Concordia University, the Musée d'art contemporain de Montréal, and the Storm-King Art Centre.

== Biography ==
Rosenfield was born in 1910 in Kodoc, Poland. She came to Montreal in 1919. Rosenfield later had two children: a daughter and a son.

After she turned 45 and her children were older, she began studying sculpting at the École des Beaux-Arts. Joking about her late start in life as a sculptor, Rosenfield's husband liked to call her "Montreal's Grandma Moses". Her teachers included Quebec sculptors Armand Filion, Sylvia Daoust and Louis Archambault. Rosenfield was one of the founding members of the Quebec Sculptors' Association in 1962.

Although she sometimes worked in wood and bronze, Rosenfield primarily worked in stone, including limestone from Indiana and marble from Carrara, Verona and Quebec. Rosenfield's style as a sculptor often focused on "organic forms, abstract or schematized, the latter representing faces and female bodies". Her work was exhibited at the Musée Rodin in Paris, and in group exhibitions at the Place des Arts, the Thomas More Institute, Sir George Williams University, University of Waterloo, University of Sherbrooke, National Arts Centre, Expo 67, Musee d’Art Contemporaine, and the Montreal Museum of Fine Arts.

Rosenfield offered mentorship and support to younger artists such as Ora Markstein, a Holocaust survivor from Hungary who immigrated to Canada in the mid-1970s. Upon seeing some photographs of Markstein's earlier plaster sculptures, Rosenfield told her: "But you are thinking in stone! You feel in stone!". Encouraging her to take classes in stone sculpting, Rosenfield arranged for Markstein to receive a scholarship at the Saidye Bronfman Centre.

Rosenfield moved to Toronto in 1978. She died in 2000 in Scarborough, Ontario.

Her sculpture is included in various public and private collections, including Concordia University, the Musée d'art contemporain de Montréal and the Storm King Art Center.
