= Judes Poirier =

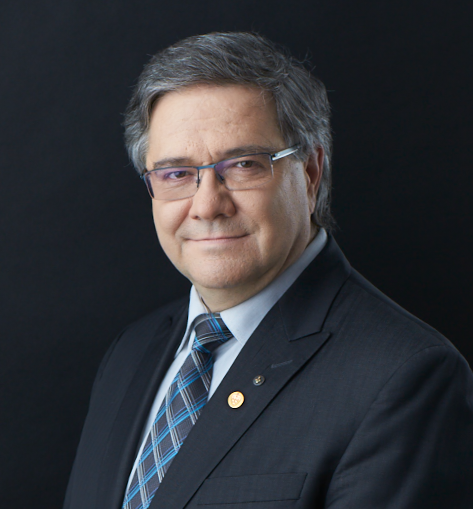
Portrait of Dr. Judes Poirier

Judes Poirier is Canadian-born professor of Medicine and Psychiatry at McGill University and former director of the Centre for Studies in Aging at McGill University. He currently serves as director of the Molecular Neurobiology Unit at the Douglas Institute Research Centre and, co-founder and associate director of the Centre for the Studies on the Prevention of Alzheimer's disease at McGill University.

== Career ==
He received his undergraduate training at the Université de Montréal in biochemistry and clinical sciences. Shortly after, he joined Dr. André Barbeau’s group at the Clinical Research Institute of Montréal where he worked on the neurobiology of Parkinson's disease. He then moved to the Alzheimer’s Disease Research Consortium of Southern California which is based at the Andrus Gerontology Centre, in Los Angeles. It is in California that he discovered the important role of apolipoprotein E, a cholesterol transporter that acts as a powerful modulator of brain reinnervation and a key player in Alzheimer's disease pathophysiology. In 1989, McGill University and the Douglas Institute recruited him back to Montréal to establish a research program specialized in the molecular biology of neurodegenerative diseases.

== Significant contributions ==
Dr. Poirier has made some key contributions to the advancement of scientific research on Alzheimer's and Parkinson's diseases. He belongs to a short list of Canadian scientists who made milestone discoveries in Canadian Health Research history. He is internationally renowned for his works on the role of apolipoprotein E in the normal and injured brain and, in the genetics of Alzheimer's disease. Beside his seminal contribution in the field of the neurobiology and genetics of apolipoprotein E, he has been a pioneer in the establishment of the pharmacogenomic bases of brain diseases treatment.

Dr Poirier is also the co-founder of several Canadian-based biotech corporations including Nova Molecular Inc. (1996–2000) and more recently Spectral Neuroscience Inc. (2004 -) which have been involved in the development and commercialization of pharmacogenomics services and gene-based therapy for biotech and pharmaceutical corporations.

== Honours and awards ==
He received several international scientific awards in recent years including: the International Society for Neurochemistry Investigator Award in 1995, in Kyoto, Japan; the AAIC/First Parke-Davis International Award (now referred to as the AAIC Lifetime Achievement Award in Alzheimer's Disease) in 1996, in Osaka, Japan and the Galien Prize (1997). On national scene, he was the recipient of the Beaubien Award of the Alzheimer Society of Canada (1994) and, the Investigator Award (1994) and Innovation Award (1998) of Canadian College of Neuropsychopharmacology (CCNP). He was more recently awarded the Jonas Salk Award (1999) in honor of Dr. Salk, the inventor of the polio vaccine, the AstraZeneca/ASC/RxDx Award (2001) and the CSCC Award (2001) for his seminal work in the field of Alzheimer’s disease. In the summer of 2004, he was nominated to the rank of Knight of the National Order of Quebec by the Premier of Quebec. He received in the fall of 2009 a Doctorate Honoris Causa in Medicine in regard to his pioneering work in the field of Alzheimer’s research from this oldest School of Medicine in the world, the University of Montpellier in France. In 2010, he was awarded the prestigious Genesis Prize in the "Innovation of Tomorrow" category.

He acts as a Scientific Ambassador of the Alzheimer Society of Canada and was nominated one of the Ten Personality of the Year in 1996 in the magazine l'actualité and Personality of the Week in the newspaper La Presse, in 1998 and again, in 2014.

His most recent contribution to a lay audience is the publication of a book entitled Alzheimer's Disease: A Guide, published in 2011 in French, English, German, Portuguese and Chinese. His publication was awarded the 2012 prestigious "Hubert Reeves Literary Prize".

== Other kudos ==
- 2004 - Knight from the Ordre national du Québec
- 2009 - Honorary degree, faculty of medicine, University of Montpellier, France
- 2010 - Genesis award from Genome Québec and Bioquebec
- 2012 - Hubert Reeves Award
- 2014 - Personality of the Week, La Presse newspaper
- 2015 - Top 10 Discoveries in Science in 2014
