= Jennifer Lonergan =

Canadian historian and social entrepreneur

Jennifer Lonergan is a Canadian historian and social entrepreneur. She is the co-founder and executive director of the Montreal-based charity Artistri Sud.

== Background and education ==
Lonergan was born and raised in Montreal, Quebec. She has a PhD in women's history and fifteen years' experience in education and curriculum development. After working as a teacher at the university, college and high school levels, she moved into the field of public history and worked at The Canadian Museum of History in Ottawa and at National Historic Sites, Parks Canada. In 2009 she founded Artistri Sud, a registered charity that works to empower women artisans in developing countries through entrepreneurship training. She is currently the executive director of Artistri Sud.

== Artistri Sud ==
In 2009 Lonergan co-founded the registered charity Artistri Sud, with a mission of supporting and empowering women artisans in developing countries. The goal was to enable women in developing countries to create sustainable livelihoods for themselves by selling self-made products in their micro-enterprises. In addition to empowering women, the organization aims to raise awareness about the value of craftswomen and their work and to preserve their culture and heritage traditions.

Artistri Sud develops women artisans’ business capacity by providing them with entrepreneurship training, giving them the skills and resources they need to generate income from their micro-enterprises and reach greater financial autonomy. Artistri Sud has worked with women artisan groups in countries including Bolivia, Chile, Cambodia, India and Zimbabwe.

Prior to launching the charity, Lonergan opened a retail store in 2008, Artistri Atelier Boutique. The idea was to support women craftspeople both in Canada and in the developing world by promoting and selling their work in the store. The retail store is now closed.
