= Braulio Rocha =

Portuguese-Canadian photographer

Braulio Rocha is a Portuguese–Canadian photographer.

== Career ==
In 2013, Rocha moved to Canada and was employed as a janitor at the Congregation Shaar Hashomayim. For several years, he began to do photography as a side job, taking pictures for bar and bat mitzvah ceremonies, and eventually quit his janitorial work in 2019.

== Personal life ==
Rocha was born in Madeira as the son of a salesman and a hairdresser. He dropped out of high school and got a job as a waiter. In February 2020, he had a daughter, with his wife Sonia Ganança.
