= Édouard Jasmin =

Canadian artist (1905-1987)

- Born: November 9, 1905; Rang du Bois-Franc, in Saint-Laurent (now part of Montréal)
- Died: May 29, 1987 (aged 81–82); Montréal
- Known for: ceramic artist, painter, writer

Édouard Jasmin (1905 – 1987) was a Canadian artist from Quebec, known for his ceramic platters in which he sought to capture scenes of modern Quebec.

== Career ==
Édouard Jasmin was born in Saint-Laurent (today part of Montreal). He left school early to work at different art-related jobs since he was talented in that area. From 1923 to 1933, he ran an import business, then opened a restaurant in the basement of his home on rue Saint-Denis, Montreal, then got a job as a handyman and from 1960 to 1976, at the Service des parcs de la ville de Montréal. In his restaurant he started to paint, decorating the walls and furniture and also drawing and painting independently. He also began to work with clay and, upon retirement, created small narrative murals on large platters for which he became known.

In a 1985 interview, Jasmin said:

I always try to find the amusing, the pleasant side of life….So I like to create fantasies and oddities, sometimes exaggerated, and if they make people laugh, then I too am happy.

Jasmin died in Montreal in 1987. His fonds is in the Bibliothèque et Archives nationales à Montréal.

== Selected public collections and exhibitions ==
Jasmin's ceramic work is in the collection of the Art Gallery of Nova Scotia; the Canadian Museum of History; the Museum of Fine Arts, Houston; and other institutions.

In 2022, the Art Gallery of Nova Scotia, one of the main repositories of Canadian folk art along with the Canadian Museum of History, included 16 of Jasmin's platters which it had recently purchased in a show titled Folk/Funk.
