= Ian Gailer =

Ian H. Gailer is a festival and organization manager from Quebec. He was the general director and artistic director of Regard – Saguenay International Short Film Festival from 2007 to 2015 and the Quebec City Film Festival from 2015 to 2020. He is the owner and principal consultant of Gailer & Co., a strategic support firm for small and medium enterprises, associations and non-profit organizations in the artistic and cultural fields, founded by Gailer according to the principles of growth hacking.

== Biography ==
Originally from Montreal, Ian Gailer trained in radio and television at the Cégep de Jonquière and then graduated in 2007 with honors from the Université du Québec à Chicoutimi with a bachelor's degree in administration. During his tenure at the Regard Festival, he introduced French subtitling for all films thanks to the services of students from Université Laval, and did the same while directing the Quebec City Film Festival.

He replaced co-founder Marie-Christine Laflamme at the helm of the Quebec City Film Festival. He changed the artistic direction of the event to include older films, American independent films and more mainstream films. During his leadership, the festival programed a feature film from Quebec as the opening film for each edition of the event and added a screening room: to the Palais Montcalm, the Conservatoire d’art dramatique de Québec and the Musée national des beaux-arts du Québec was added the brand new Le Diamant screening room, the distributor and creation venue for Robert Lepage's Ex Machina theater and multidisciplinary company, located at the entrance of Old Quebec. By the time he left in 2020, Gailer had helped nearly triple the festival's attendance and increase its revenue by nearly 20%. He also implemented a "professional" component to the organization (scholarships, training workshops for emerging artists, etc.).

In 2015, Gailer was a member of the jury for the 30th edition of the International Francophone Film Festival in Namur, Belgium, after having been a member of other jurys in Switzerland, Moncton and the United Kingdom. From 2016 to 2017, within a seven member advisory committee, he was a special advisor to the Minister of Culture and Communications of Quebec Hélène David to advise her in her efforts to renew Quebec's governmental cultural policy. The previous government policy dated back to 1992. In 2021, he was appointed director on the board of directors of TV5 Québec Canada by Nathalie Roy, Quebec's Minister of Culture and Communications at the time.

In March 2026, following discussions with the Quebec City artistic duo Cooke-Sasseville, he made a public statement in support of adding public art to Quebec City's network of long staircases connecting the Lower Town and the Upper Town. His "Projet: Escaliers" seeks to highlight this urban furniture by transforming it into a "living, constantly evolving vertical museum where local public art engages in dialogue with creators from around the world". According to Le Journal de Québec, the project was presented to several stakeholders in the Quebec City region, including city councillors from Quebec City, who reportedly expressed interest.^{,} Quebec City Mayor Bruno Marchand said on this subject that "making [the stairs] a visual signature, I like the idea".
