= Adam Azimov =

Canadian film director

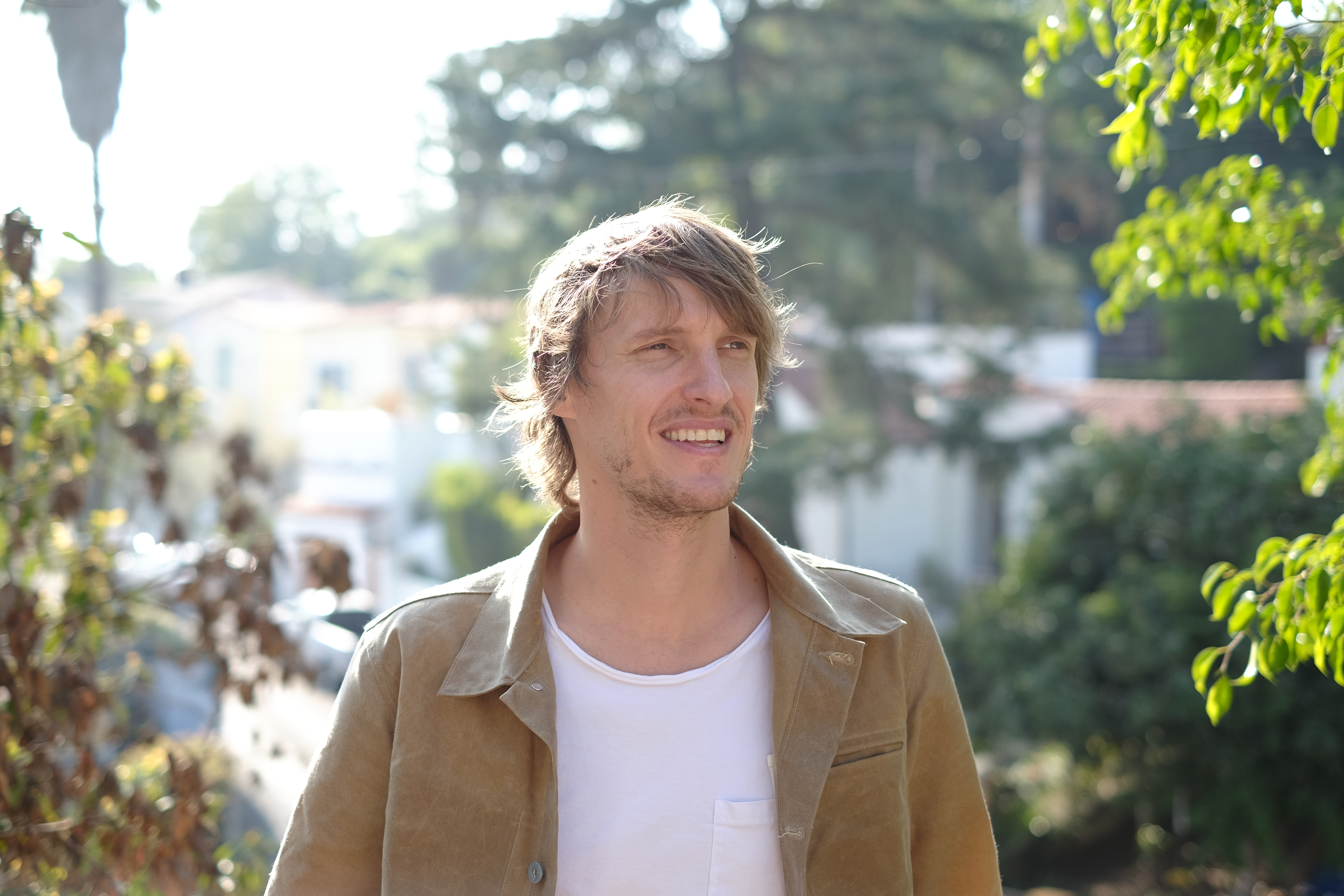
- Adam Azimov - Shoot Online representation announcement
- Born: Montreal
- Occupation: film director

Adam Azimov is a Canadian film director. He is an alumnus of the Canadian Film Centre, where he participated in the Cineplex Entertainment Film Program (Directors' Lab) and the Short Dramatic Film Program.

Growing up in Montreal, Azimov attended Concordia University's Communications Film Program. He began his professional career as an editor before transitioning into directing, where he has produced award-winning short films and commercials. Azimov won the Short Film award at the Reelworld Film Festival for his film "Silent Cargo", starring Ellen Wong.

Azimov is based in Los Angeles and has directed commercial campaigns for high-profile brands such as Adidas, Lexus, McDonald's, Coca-Cola, eBay, and Lincoln. In 2019, he signed with Artclass Content for representation in the US.
