= Louis Jaque =

Canadian painter (1919–2010)

Louis Jaque (May 1, 1919, in Montreal – January 7, 2010, in Montreal) was a Canadian painter who belonged to the Quebec modernist movement of the post war period. He is known for his abstract painting, printmaking, furniture design, interior decorator, and teaching.

== Biography ==
Jaque began painting in 1944 following his army service. He received his diploma from the Ecole du Meuble where he studied with Jean Paul Lemieux and Paul-Emile Borduas. He embraced abstraction in the 1950s and had a solo exhibition at the Montreal Museum of Contemporary Art in 1966. He was one of the founding members in 1969 of the Société des Artistes Professionnels du Québec (SAPQ) and its first president. He made a monumental mural for the Quebec pavilion at the Osaka Universal Exhibition in Japan in 1970 and another one in 1972 for the Maison de Radio-Canada (CBC) on René-Lévesque Boulevard in Montreal.

In 1977, the Montreal Museum of Fine Arts organized a large retrospective exhibition of his work titled Louis Jaque, 25 ans de carrière. He was a member of the Royal Canadian Academy of Arts (1978). His works can be found in many private and public collections, mainly in Canada, France, Italy and the United States.

Louis Jaque's artwork has been at auction with realized values varying depending on the size and medium of the piece. Since 2017, SILVER DART, which was auctioned at BYDealers Auction House in 2021, has fetched the auction price of $3,229 USD.. Another work from 1969 has reached the auction price of $9,600 CAD in October 2025 at the same auction house.

== Collections ==
- National Gallery of Canada, Ottawa
- Musée National des Beaux-Arts du Québec
- Montreal Museum of Fine Arts
- Art Gallery of Nova Scotia
- Beaverbrook Art Gallery, Fredericton, New Brunswick
- Montreal Museum of Contemporary Art
- Musée des Beaux-Arts de Sherbrooke
- Musée d'art de Joliette
- Musée Laurier
