= Pascal Lochard =

Canadian football player (born 1990)

No. 24, 25, 34
- Position: Running back

Personal information
- Born: September 17, 1990 (age 36); Montreal, Quebec, Canada
- Listed height: 6 ft 0 in (1.83 m)
- Listed weight: 215 lb (98 kg)

Career information
- High school: Cactus du Collège Notre-Dame
- University: Laval (2010–2013)
- CFL draft: 2014: 2nd round, 14th overall pick

Career history
- 2014–2015: BC Lions
- 2016: Winnipeg Blue Bombers
- 2017: Ottawa Redblacks*
- 2017–2018: Edmonton Eskimos
- * Offseason or practice squad member only

Awards and highlights
- 3× Vanier Cup champion (2010, 2012, 2013)
- Stats at CFL.ca

Pascal Lochard (born September 17, 1990) is a Canadian former professional football running back who played in the Canadian Football League (CFL). He was selected by the BC Lions in the second round of the 2014 CFL draft after playing CIS football at Laval University. He was also a member of the Winnipeg Blue Bombers, Ottawa Redblacks and Edmonton Eskimos.

== Early life ==
Pascal Lochard was born on September 17, 1990, in Montreal. He played CEGEP football at Cégep du Vieux Montréal.

== University career ==
Lochard played CIS football for the Laval Rouge et Or of Laval University from 2010 to 2013, helping the team advance to the Vanier Cup four years in a row while winning three of them. He rushed for career totals of 1,749 yards and 17 touchdowns on 301 carries while also catching 24 passes for 190 yards and a touchdown. He was named the most valuable player of the 49th Vanier Cup, winning the Ted Morris Memorial Trophy.

== Professional career ==
Lochard was selected by the BC Lions in the second round, with the fourteenth overall pick of the 2014 CFL draft. He dressed in 15 games for the Lions during his rookie year in 2014, recording five special teams tackles and three carries for 11 yards. He dressed in 17 games during the 2015 season, posting 11 special teams tackles.

Lochard signed with the Winnipeg Blue Bombers on February 9, 2016. He dressed in 14 games for the Blue Bombers in 2016, totaling one defensive tackle, seven special teams tackles, eight rushing attempts for 33 yards, and two kick returns for 19 yards.

Upon entering 2017 free agency, Lochard signed a two-year contract with the Ottawa Redblacks. He was released by the Redblacks on May 8, 2017.

Lochard was signed by the Edmonton Eskimos on May 26, 2017. He dressed in 16 games, starting two, in 2017, rushing 14 times for 104 yards and catching one pass for five yards. He also recorded ten special teams tackles and returned five kicks for 76 yards. Lochard dressed in seven games during his final CFL season in 2018, accumulating five special teams tackles, one fumble recovery, and one kick return for 17 yards.
