= Frederic Marcotte =

Frédéric Marcotte
- Born: August 3, 1975 (age 51); Montreal, Canada
- Occupation: Poet

Frederic Marcotte is a poet and musician.

He published Évangile (gospel) in August 2010, which earned him to be finalist for the poetry prize of the Fondation Émile-Nelligan for Canadian poets under 35 years old. In March 2011, Théorie de la crise (crisis theory) was published by the same publisher—Les Herbes Rouges, followed by Notre-Dame-du-Vertige in 2013. Other poetic works are in progress.

== Papers on poetic works ==
BRASSARD, Denise, Perdre ses traces (Losing track) in Voix et Images, no 108, Spring-Summer 2011, p. 117-125.

CLOUTIER, Mario, Métropoétique in La Presse, Arts section, January 28, 2011.

GAGNÉ, Dominic, Carnets de résonance VII : vents contraires in Estuaire, no 155, p. 118-119.

== Publications in periodicals ==
Notre-Dame-du-Vertige (Our Lady Vertigo) in Jet d'encre, Spring-Summer 2011, p. 131-138.

Idoles de guerre (war idols) in ''Les Écrits'' (revue), no 132, August 2011, p. 109-113.

Vacance de Dieu (vacations of God) in Les Écrits (revue), no 135, August 2012, p. 67-71.

Chants in Les Écrits (revue), no 140, March 2014, p. 131-135.

Surtout ne me libère pas in Estuaire, no 157, May 2014, p. 63-67.

== Poetic works ==
Évangile (gospel), Les Herbes Rouges, August 2010, 177 pages.

Théorie de la crise (crisis theory), Les Herbes Rouges, March 2011, 158 pages.

Notre-Dame-du-Vertige (Our Lady Vertigo), Les Herbes Rouges, April 2013, 136 pages.
