= David Armstrong Six =

Canadian artist (born 1968)

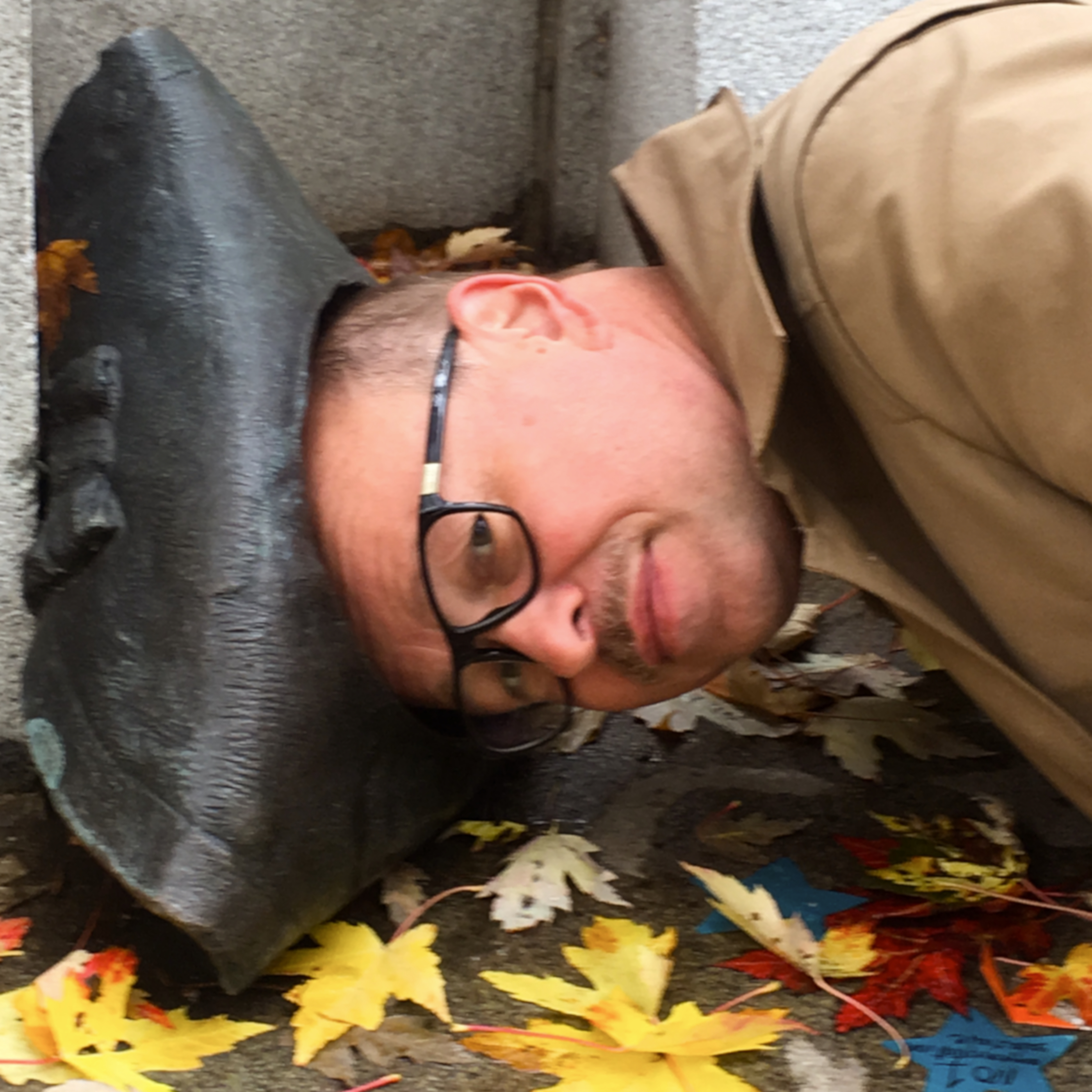
- Born: David Thomas Armstrong; 1968 (age 57–58); Belleville, Ontario, Canada
- Education: Queen's University at Kingston (BFA)
- Occupation: Artist

David Armstrong VI (born David Thomas Armstrong, 1968) is a Canadian artist, living and working in Montreal, Quebec.

== Career ==
Armstrong Six's solo exhibitions include:

- 2000, Leak into Space at Mercer Union, Toronto
- 2000, The Soup at Plug In Gallery, Winnipeg
- 2001, Dog Leg Room at Blanche, Paris
- 2003, I've Been Thinking at Goodwater, Toronto
- 2004, Free at Optica, Montreal
- 2006, The Hole at Espace Kugler, Geneva
- 2007, No Refunds at Articule, Montreal
- 2008, The Dry Salvages at Parisian Laundry, Montréal
- 2008, How are You Feeling Doctor? at Goodwater, Toronto
- 2008, Rien ne se perd, rien ne se crée, tout se transforme at the Musée d'art contemporain de Montréal
- 2011, The Gamblers at La Biennale de Montréal
- 2013, Brown Star Plus One at Parisian Laundry, Montréal
- 2013, Three Known Points at the Museum of Contemporary Canadian Art, Toronto
- 2016, Bracelets at Parisian Laundry, Montréal
- 2017, If By Dull Rhymes with Kristan Horton at Clint Roenisch Gallery, Toronto
- 2019, Night School at the Darling Foundry, Montréal

== Prizes ==
- Conseil des arts et des lettres du Québec, 2010
- Canada Council for the Arts, 2009
- Canada Council for the Arts, 2002
- Toronto Arts Council, 2001
- Ontario Arts Council, 2001

== Gallery ==
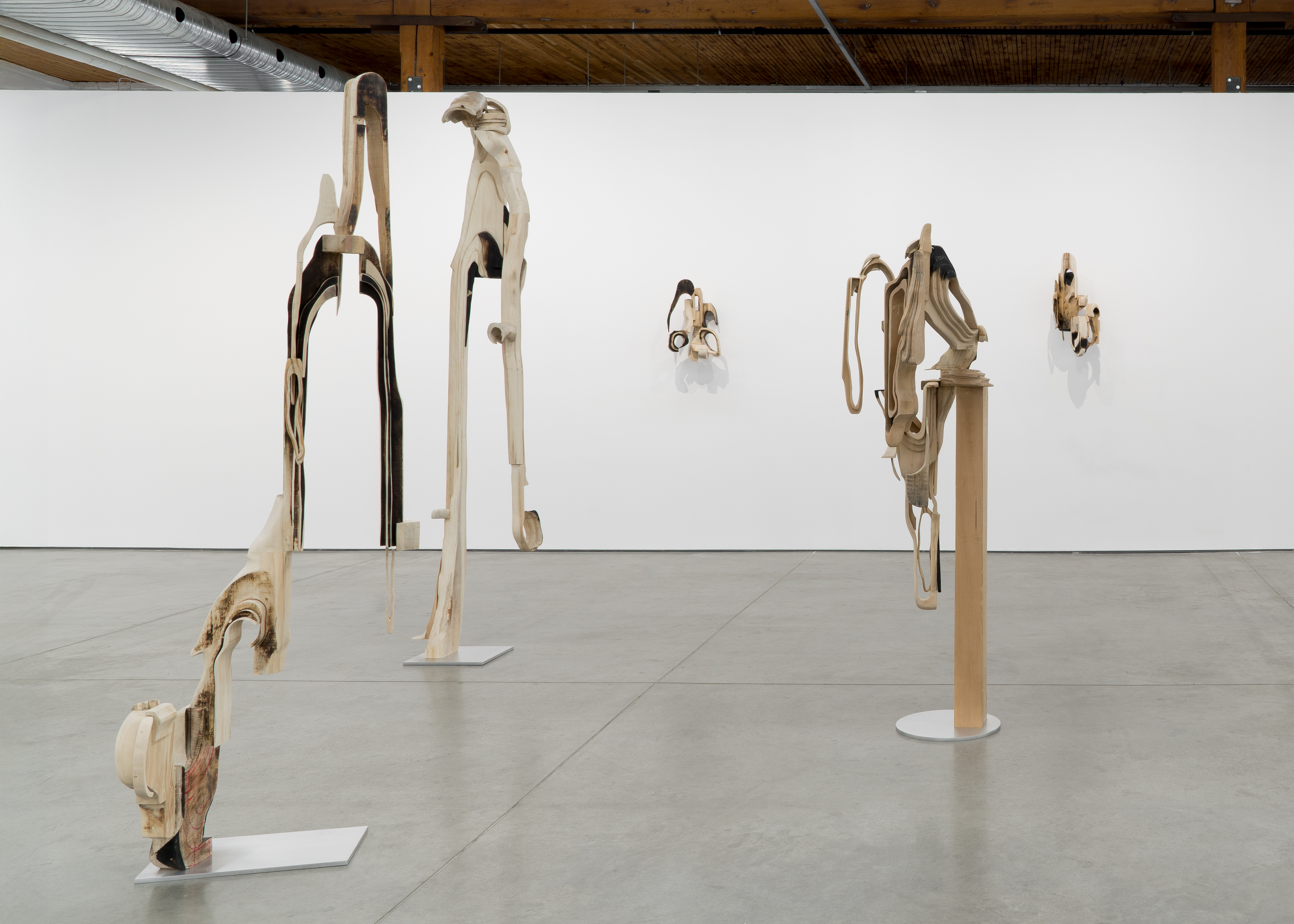
David Armstrong Six (2025) lie down with holograms Bradley Ertaskiran

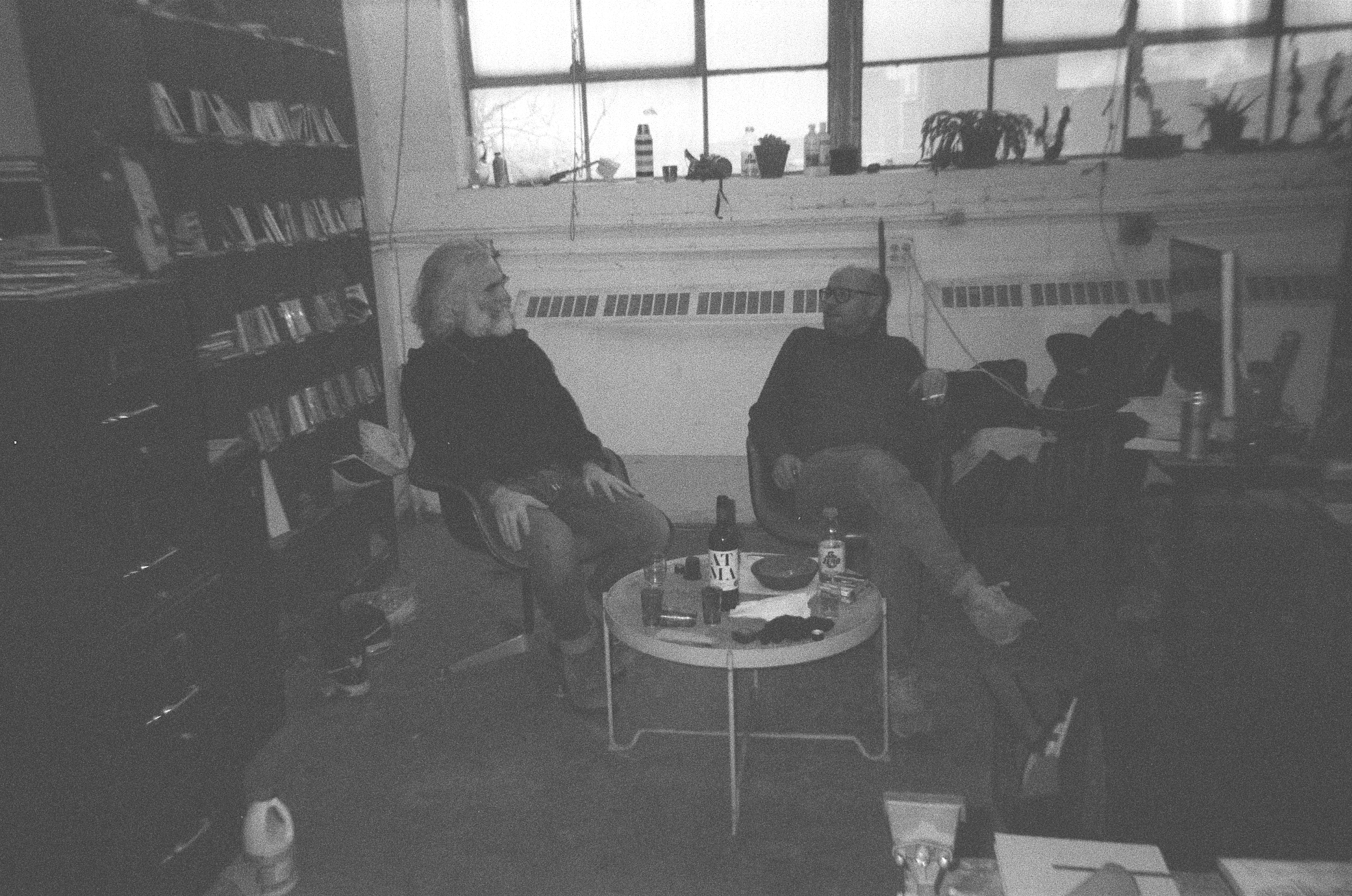
Kristan Horton, David Armstrong Six 2025

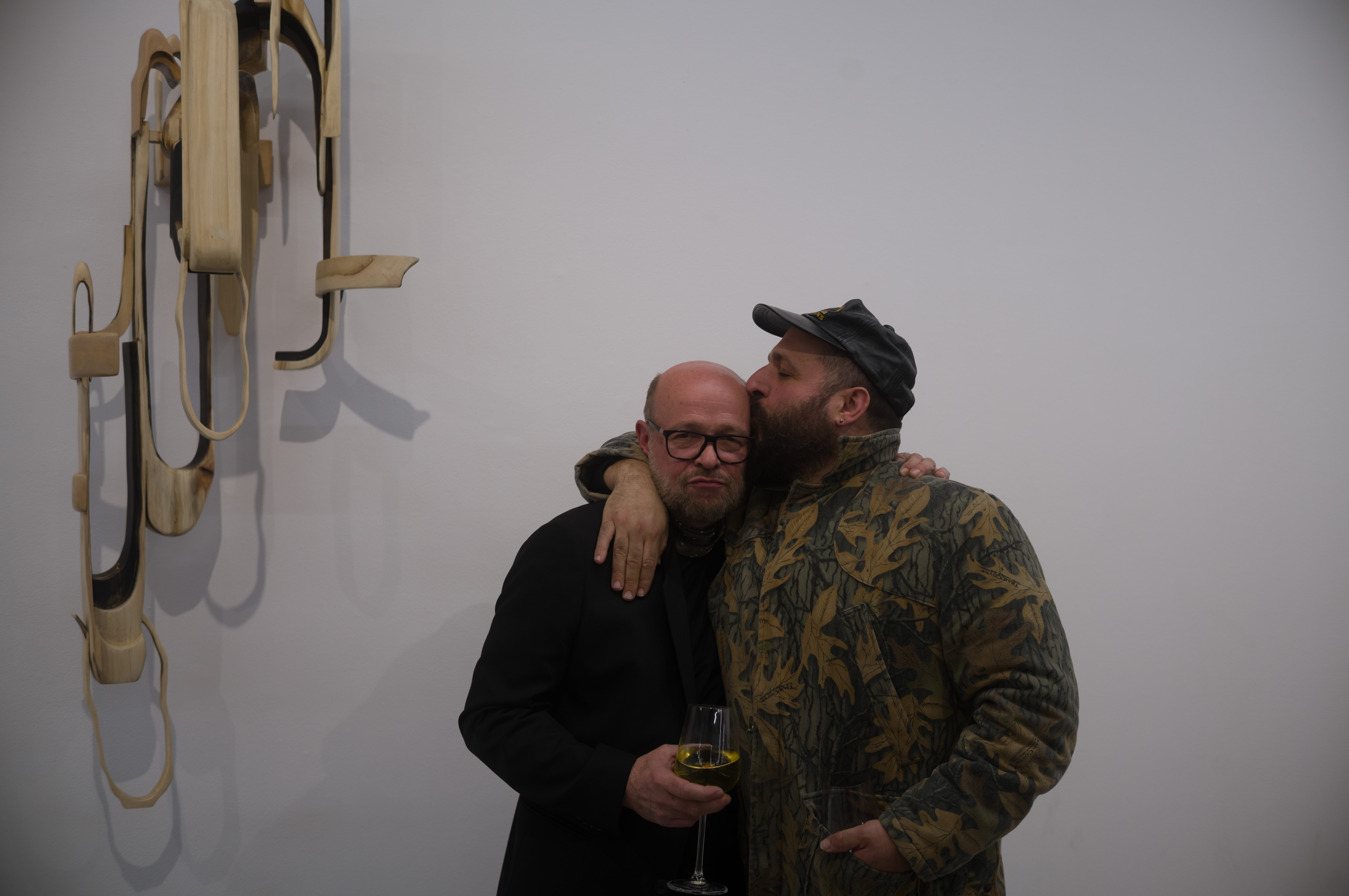
David Armstrong Six, Tony Romano (2025) lie die with holograms vernissage

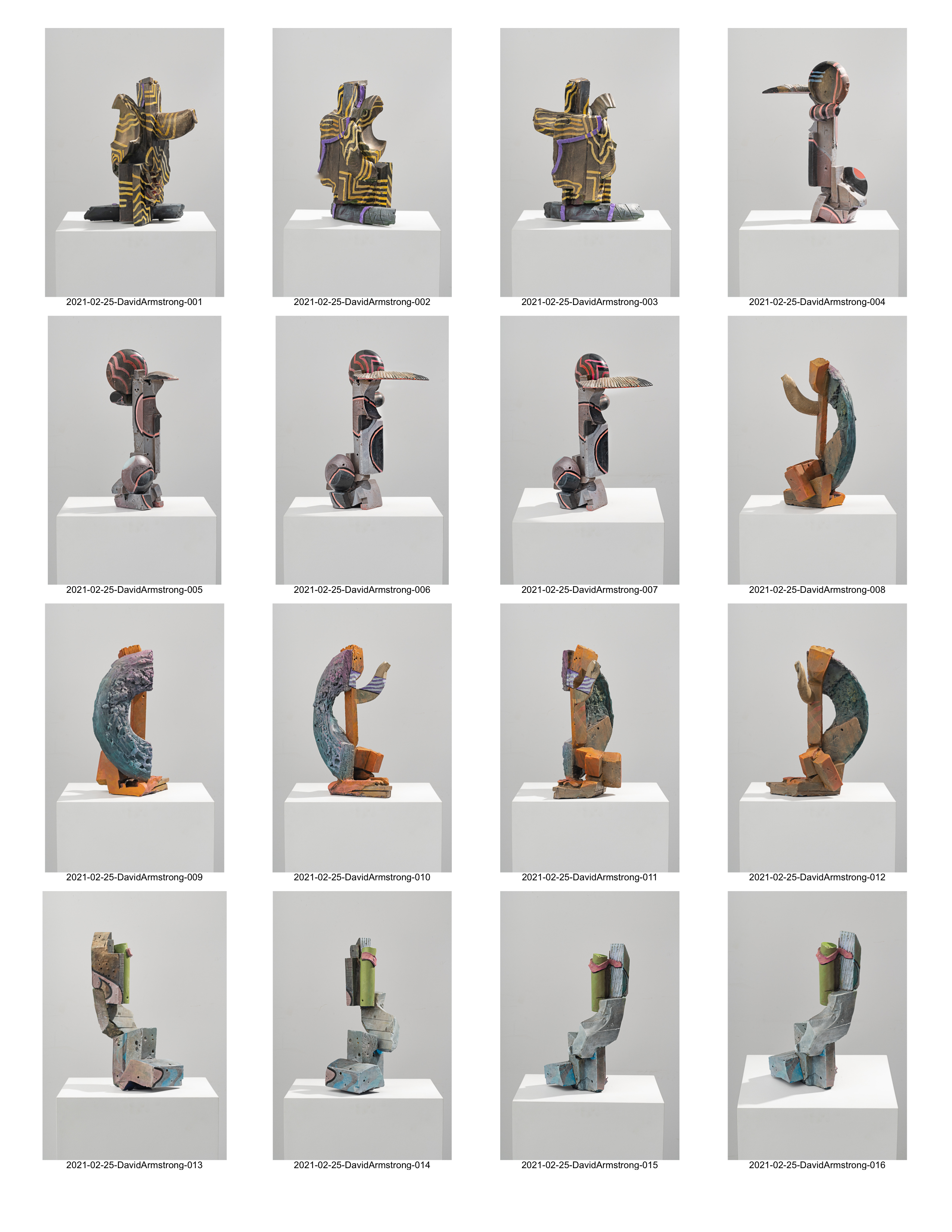
from the series "he do the police in different voices" (2020)

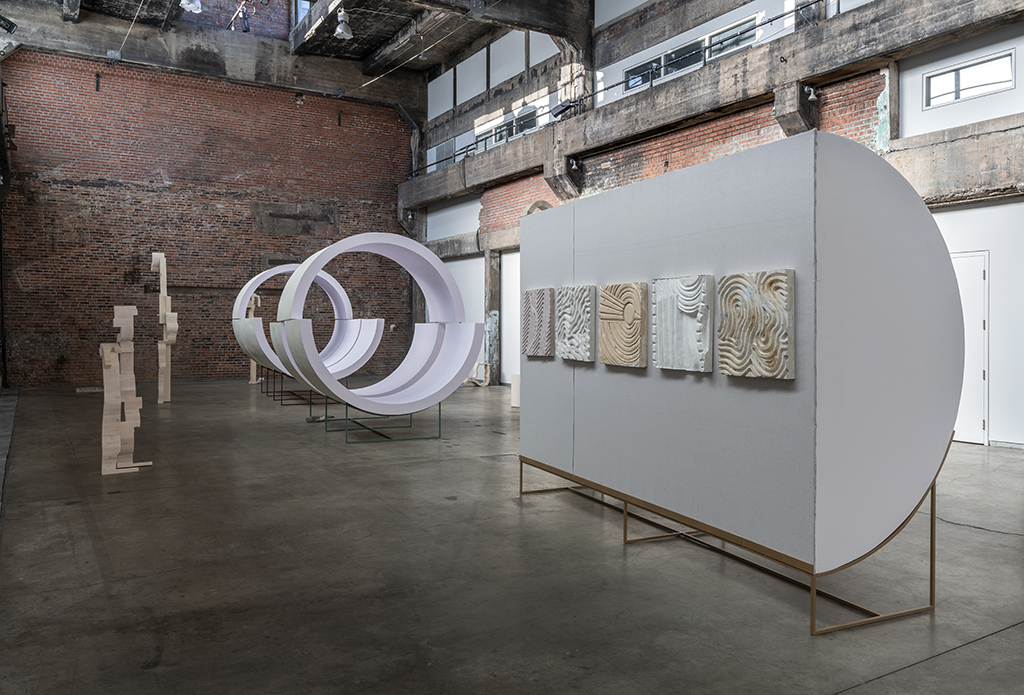
"Night School" installation view, Darling Foundry, Montréal (2019)

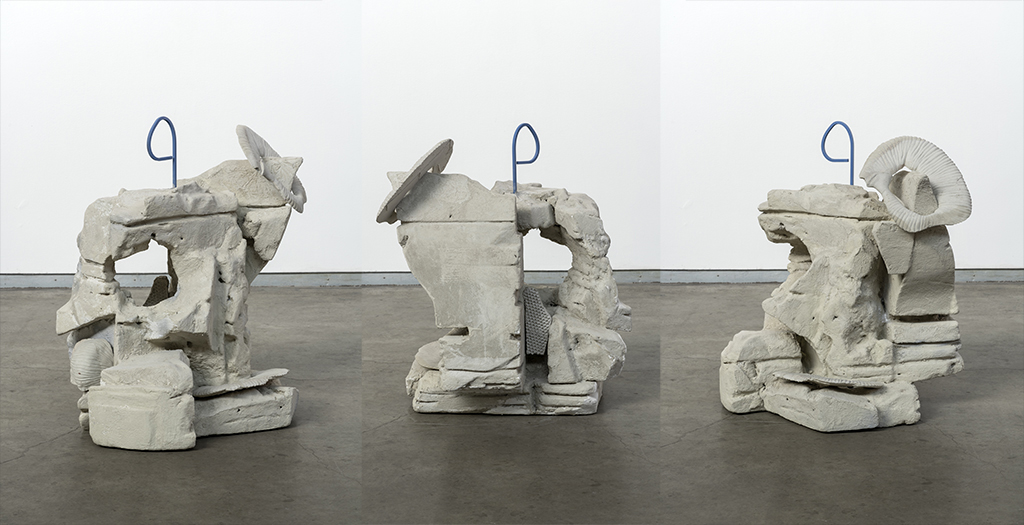
GraduateYukimura, part of "Night School" (2019) Darling Foundry, Montréal

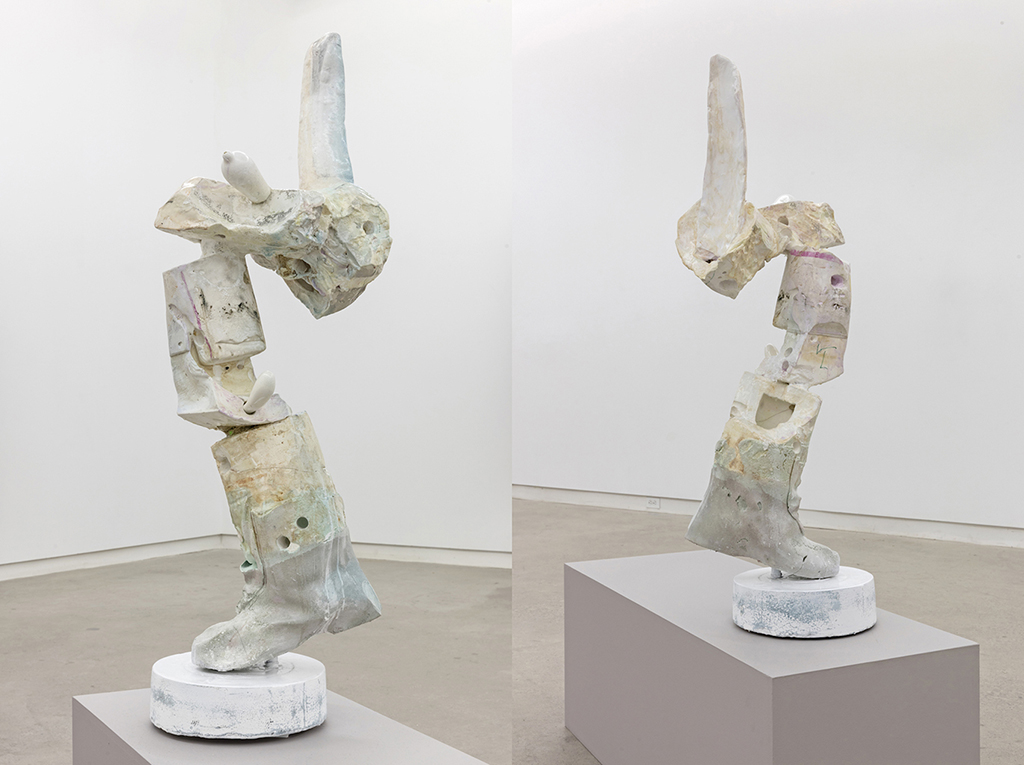
Moonshade Walk'r (2017)

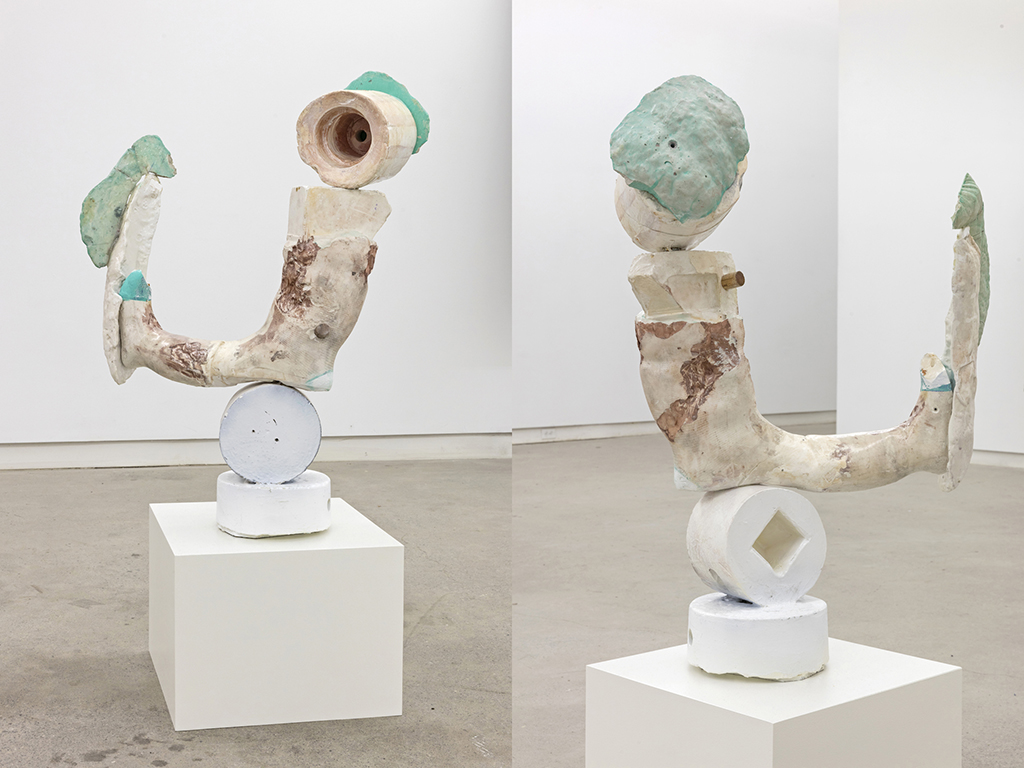
Dwarf Mallow (2017)

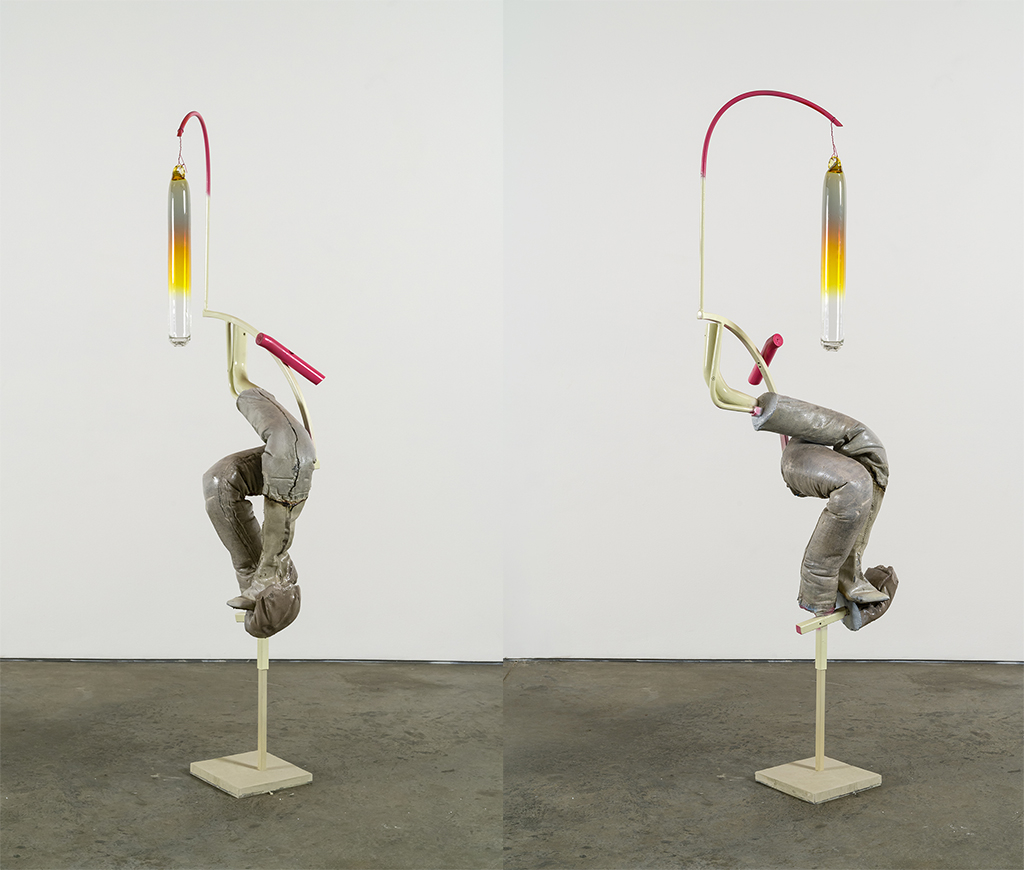
All Floss From Flight (2017)

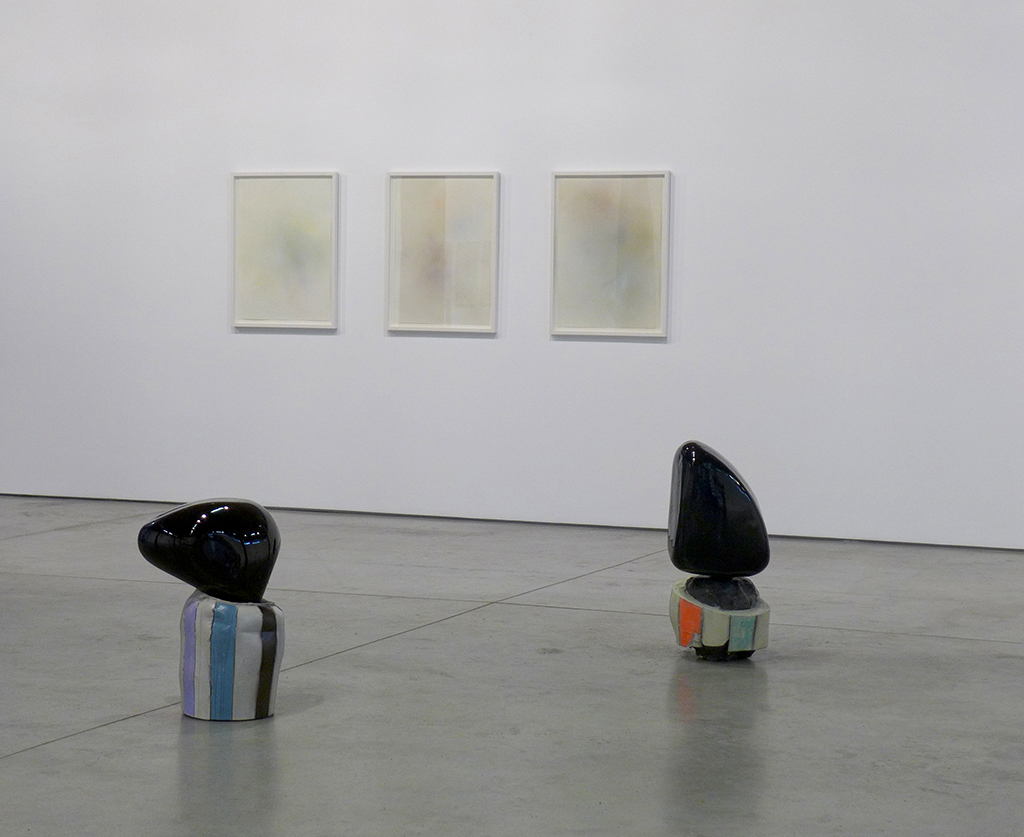
les fleurs d'erg (2017)

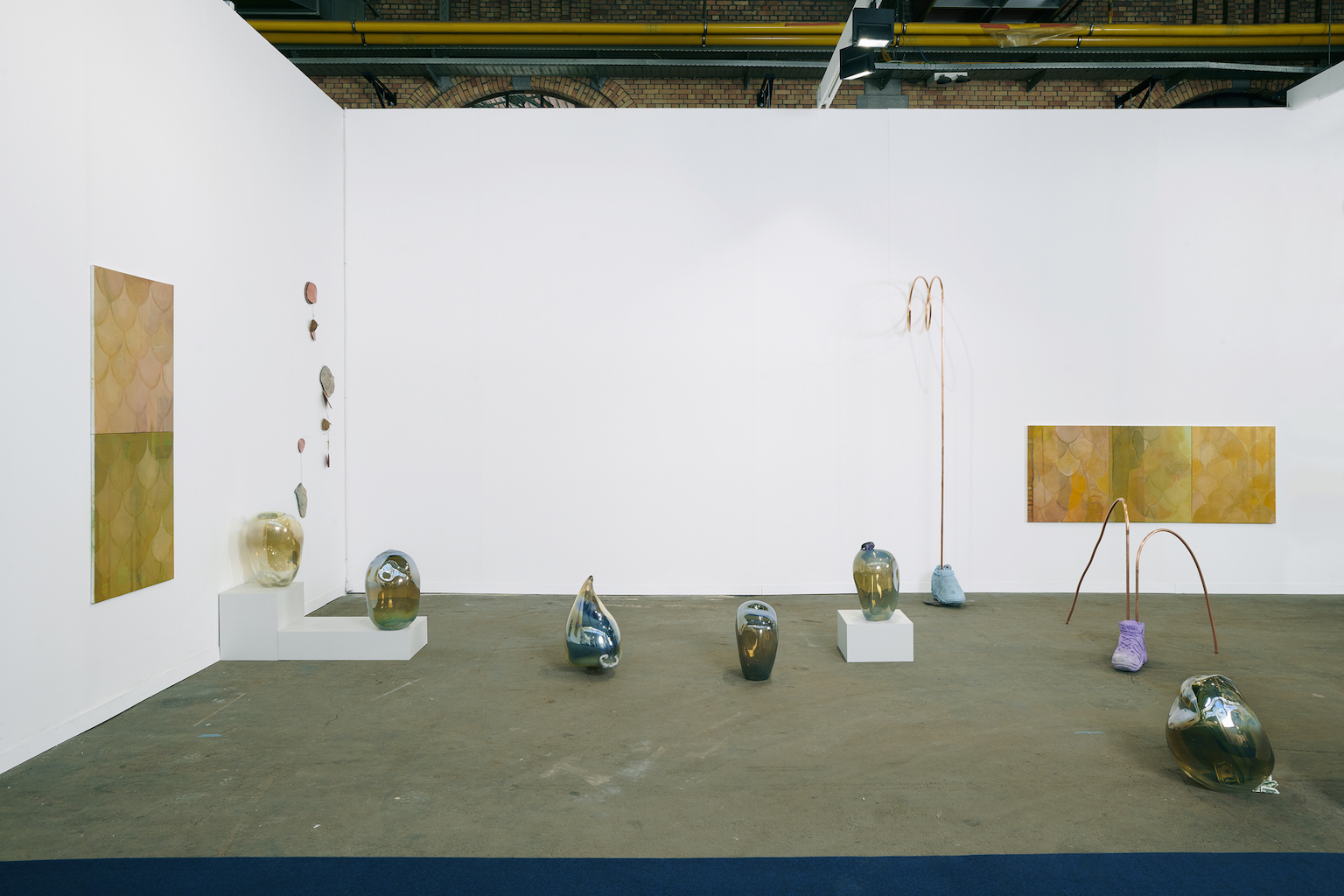
art brussels

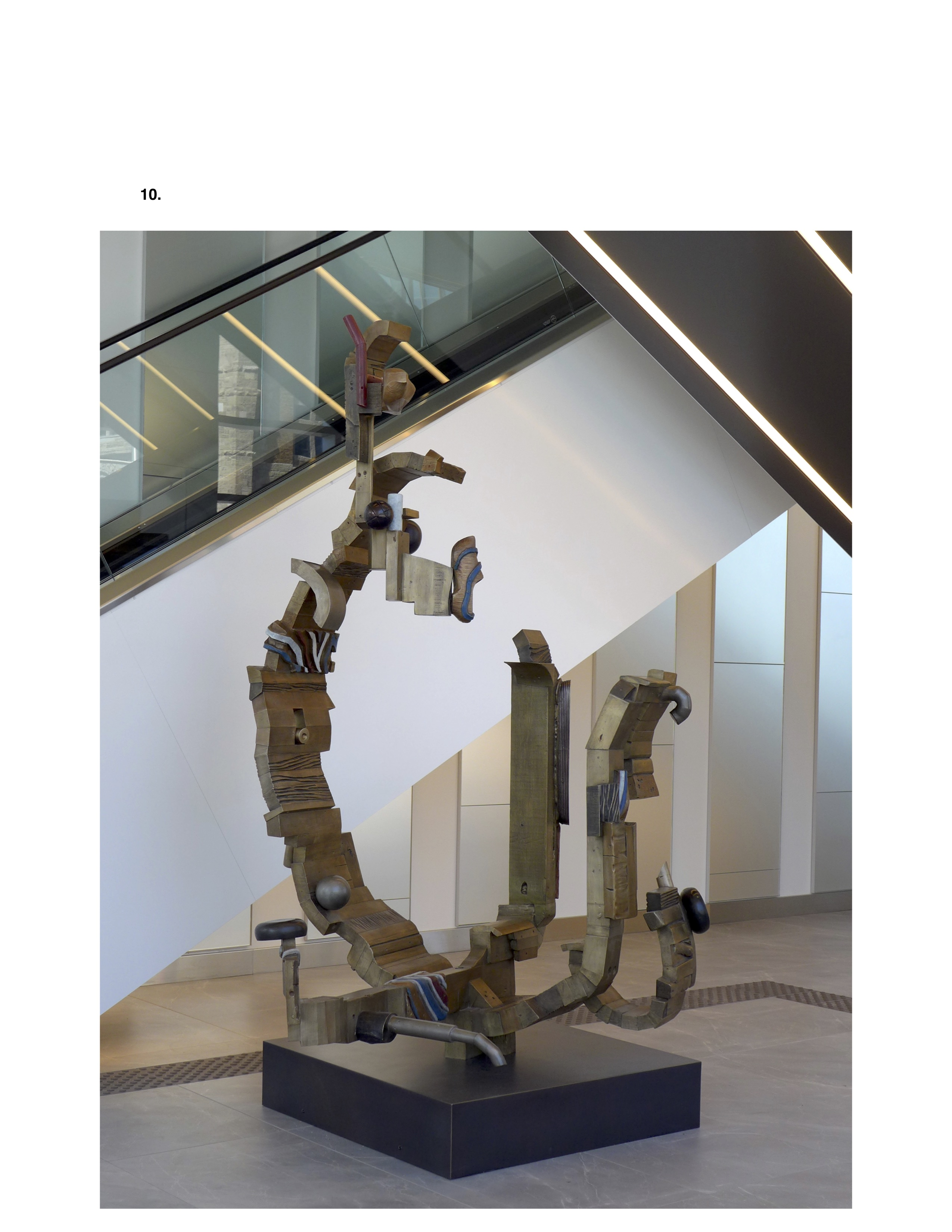
Portrait de Patrick Roy ( 2019)
