= List of people from Ontario =

Notable people from Ontario, Canada

Provincial flag of Ontario

This is a list of notable people who were either born or lived in Ontario, Canada, or have spent a large part or formative part of their career in that province.

== Film, television, and voice actors ==
Name	Notable for	Connection to Ontario
Patrick J. Adams (born 1981)	Suits	born in Toronto
Robbie Amell (born 1988)	The Flash	born in Toronto
Stephen Amell (born 1981)	Arrow and Teenage Mutant Ninja Turtles 2: Out of the Shadows	born in Toronto
Will Arnett (born 1970)		born in Toronto
Matt Austin (born 1978)	Power Rangers S.P.D.	born in Toronto
Dan Aykroyd (born 1952)	Saturday Night Live	born in Ottawa
Peter Aykroyd (1955–2021)	Saturday Night Live and Psi Factor: Chronicles of the Paranormal	born in Ottawa
Steve Bacic (born 1965)		raised in Windsor
Lindy Booth (born 1979)		born in Oakville
Neve Campbell (born 1973)	Scream series	born in Guelph
John Candy (1950–1994)	Home Alone and Uncle Buck	born in Newmarket
Jim Carrey (born 1962)	Batman Forever, Liar Liar and The Truman Show	born in Newmarket
Michael Cera (born 1988)	Arrested Development and Superbad	born in Brampton
Sarah Chalke (born 1976)	Scrubs and Roseanne	born in Ottawa
Juan Chioran (born 1963)	Beyblade: Metal Fusion and Grossology	lived in Toronto and Stratford
A. J. Cook (born 1978)	Criminal Minds and Final Destination 2	born in Oshawa, raised in Whitby
Paulo Costanzo (born 1978)	Royal Pains	born in Brampton
Daniel DeSanto (born 1980)	Mean Girls and Are You Afraid of the Dark?	born in Toronto
Brett Dier (born 1990)	actor	born in London
Nina Dobrev (born 1989)	The Vampire Diaries and Degrassi: The Next Generation	raised in Toronto
Michael Dowse (born 1973)	director	born in London
Louis Ferreira (born 1966)		raised in North York
Victor Garber (born 1949)	The Flash and Titanic	born in London
Ryan Gosling (born 1980)	The Notebook	born in London
Graham Greene (born 1952)	Dances with Wolves and The Green Mile	born in Ohsweken
Shenae Grimes (born 1989)	90210	born in Toronto
Corey Haim (1971–2010)	The Lost Boys and Lucas	born in Toronto
Jill Hennessy (born 1968)	Crossing Jordan	raised in Kitchener
Torri Higginson (born 1969)	Stargate Atlantis	born in Burlington
Ben Hollingsworth (born 1984)	Code Black and Virgin River	born in Brockville
Jennifer Irwin (born 1975)	Superstar	born in Toronto
Andrew Jackson (born 1963)	Bakugan: Mechtanium Surge and Beyblade: Metal Fusion	born in Newmarket
Jeon Somi (born 2001)	former member of I.O.I	born in Windsor
Stana Katic (born 1978)	Castle	born in Hamilton
Isaac Kragten (born 2002)	Odd Squad	born in Caledonia
Don Lake (born 1956)	Police Academy series, frequent collaborator with Bonnie Hunt	born in Toronto
Sunny Leone (born 1981)		born in Sarnia
Eugene Levy (born 1946)	American Pie series and Schitt's Creek	born in Hamilton
Myrna Lorrie (born 1940)		born in Thunder Bay
Michela Luci (born 2006)	Dino Dana	born in Ancaster, Ontario
Rachel McAdams (born 1978)	The Notebook	born in St. Thomas
Scott McCord (born 1971)	Bakugan	born in Sarnia
Eric McCormack (born 1963)	Will & Grace	born in Toronto
Derek McGrath (born 1951)	My Secret Identity	born in Timmins
Shay Mitchell (born 1987)	Pretty Little Liars	born in Mississauga
Rick Moranis (born 1953)	Honey, I Shrunk the Kids and Ghostbusters	born in Toronto
Al Mukadam (born 1985)	Radio Free Roscoe	born in Toronto
Annie Murphy (born 1986)	Schitt's Creek	born in Ottawa
Mike Myers (born 1963)	Shrek series	born in Scarborough
Sophie Nélisse (born 2000)		born in Windsor
Catherine O'Hara (1954–2026)	SCTV and Schitt's Creek	raised in Toronto
Sandra Oh (born 1971)		born in Ottawa
Megan Park (born 1986)	The Secret Life of the American Teenager	born in Lindsay
Dan Petronijevic (born 1981)		born in Scarborough
David J. Phillips (born 1978)	Shark City, Eat Wheaties!	born in Brampton
Mary Pickford (1892–1979)	co-founder of United Artists and the Academy of Motion Picture Arts and Sciences	born in Toronto
Christopher Plummer (1929–2021)	Sound of Music, Beginners, and All the Money in the World	born in Toronto
Sarah Polley (born 1979)		born in Toronto
David Reale	Beyblade	born in Caledon
Martin Roach (born 1962)	Inspector Gadget	born in Toronto
Kathleen Robertson (born 1973)	Beverly Hills, 90210 and Scary Movie 4	born in Hamilton
Kelly Rowan (born 1965)	The O.C.	born in Ottawa
Caterina Scorsone (born 1981)	Private Practice and Grey's Anatomy	born in Toronto
Corey Sevier (born 1984)		born in Ajax
Martin Short (born 1950)		born in Hamilton
Jay Silverheels (1912–1980)	The Lone Ranger	born in Brantford
Scott Speedman (born 1975)	Felicity and Underworld films	raised in Toronto
John Stocker (born 1947)		born in Toronto
Tara Strong (born 1973)		born in Toronto
Dave Thomas (born 1949)		born in St. Catharines
Emily VanCamp (born 1986)		born in Port Perry
Lisa Yamanaka (born 1983)		born in Toronto

== Artists ==
- Troy Brooks (born 1972 in Chatham, Ontario) – painter

== Comedians ==
- Kurtis Conner – Hamilton
- Derek Edwards – Timmins
- Dave Foley – Etobicoke
- Evan Fong – Toronto
- Tom Green – Pembroke
- Phil Hartman – Brantford
- Jenny Jones – London
- Mike MacDonald – Ottawa
- Norm Macdonald – Ottawa
- Howie Mandel – Toronto
- Mark McKinney – Ottawa
- Russell Peters – Brampton
- Katherine Ryan – Sarnia
- Ron Sparks – Chatham-Kent
- Scott Thompson – North Bay
- Harland Williams – Toronto
- John Wing Jr. – Sarnia

== Professional athletes ==
- Caleb Agada (born 1994) – Nigerian-Canadian basketball player in the Israeli Premier League and for the Nigerian national basketball team
- Bolade Ajomale (born 1995) – Olympic sprinter from Richmond Hill
- Kyle Alexander (born 1996) – basketball player for Hapoel Tel Aviv of the Israeli Basketball Premier League
- Sean Avery (born 1980) – retired NHL hockey player from North York
- Alon Badat (born 1989) – Israeli soccer player from Thornhill
- Josh Bailey – NHL hockey player, New York Islanders – Bowmanville
- Rowan Barrett – basketball player from Scarborough, top scorer in the 2002 Israel Basketball Premier League
- Anthony Bennett – basketball player from Toronto
- Sam Bennett – NHL hockey player from Holland Landing
- Shane Bergman – CFL player from Waterford
- Reno Bertoia (1935–2011) – Major League baseball player from Windsor
- Oshae Brissett (born 1998), basketball player in the Israeli Basketball Premier League, former NBA player- Mississauga
- Tajon Buchanan (born 1999) – soccer player – Brampton
- Marcus Carr (born 1999) – basketball player in the Israeli Basketball Premier League
- Tomer Chencinski (born 1984) – Israeli-Canadian football player from Thornhill
- Steve Christie (born 1967) – NFL placekicker – Hamilton
- Mike Craig – NHL player – Thorndale
- Laura Creavalle – bodybuilder – Toronto
- Nick Denis – mixed martial artist – North Bay
- Andre De Grasse – Olympic sprinter from Scarborough
- Zach Edey – NBA basketball player from Toronto
- Phil Esposito – Sault Ste. Marie
- Tony Esposito – Sault Ste. Marie
- Simon Farine (born 1987) – basketball player in the Israeli Super League, from Toronto
- Sharon Fichman (born 1990) – Canadian/Israeli tennis player from Toronto
- Mike Fisher – NHL hockey player from Peterborough
- Rick Fox – NBA player – Toronto
- Mark Friedman (born 1995) – NHL player from Toronto
- Greg Gardner (born 1975) – ice hockey player and coach
- Shai Gilgeous-Alexander (born 1998) – Toronto
- Doug Gilmour – NHL player – Kingston
- Claude Giroux – NHL player – Hearst
- Wayne Gretzky (born 1961) – Brantford
- Brooke Henderson (born 1997) – Smiths Falls
- Jack Hendrickson (born 1936) – National Hockey League player from Kingston, Ontario and Midland, Ontario
- James Hinchcliffe – Oakville
- Tim Horton – Cochrane
- Jack Hughes (born 2001) – NHL ice hockey player from Toronto
- Zach Hyman (born 1992) – NHL ice hockey player from Forest Hill
- Cory Joseph – Pickering
- Curtis Joseph – Keswick
- Nazem Kadri (born 1990) – NHL player – London
- David Levin (born 1999) – Israeli ice hockey player – Toronto
- Jesse Levine (born 1987) – American-Canadian tennis player – Ottawa
- Alex "Mine Boy" Levinsky (1910–1990) – NHL hockey player – Toronto
- Eric Lindros (born 1973) – London
- Jamaal Magloire – Toronto
- Frank Mahovlich – Timmins
- Connor McDavid – Newmarket
- Jamal Murray – NBA basketball player, Kitchener
- Rick Nash – Brampton
- Bo Naylor - Mississauga
- Josh Naylor – Mississauga
- Daniel Nestor – Toronto
- Nick Ongenda (born 2000), Israeli Basketball Premier League basketball player - Mississauga
- Bobby Orr – Parry Sound
- Pete Orr – Richmond Hill
- Bob Plager – NHL hockey player, Kirkland Lake
- Andrew Quattrin – rugby union player, Holland Landing
- Milos Raonic (born 1990) – tennis player – Thornhill
- Samuel Rothschild (1899–1987) – NHL ice hockey player – Sudbury
- Jackson Rowe (born 1997) - Israeli Basketball Premier League player - Toronto
- Jim Rutherford – Beeton
- Samuel Schachter (born 1990) – Olympic volleyball player
- Denis Shapovalov (born 1999) – Israeli-Canadian tennis player – Vaughan
- Patrick Sharp (born 1981) – NHL player – Thunder Bay
- Marial Shayok (born 1995) – basketball player in the NBA and currently in the Israeli Premier Basketball League
- Simisola Shittu (born 1999) – British-born Canadian basketball player for Ironi Ness Ziona of the Israeli Basketball Premier League - Burlington
- Darryl Sittler (born 1950) – Kitchener
- Trevor Smith (born 1985) – NHL hockey player – Ottawa
- Eric Staal – Thunder Bay
- Jordan Staal – Thunder Bay
- Marc Staal – Thunder Bay
- Steven Stamkos – Markham
- Andrew Sznajder (born 1967) – English-born Canadian tennis player – Oakville
- Tristan Thompson – Brampton
- Joe Thornton – St. Thomas
- Raffi Torres – Toronto
- Paul Tracy (born 1968) – Scarborough
- Mike Veisor (born 1952) – NHL hockey player – Toronto
- Joey Votto (born 1983) – Canadian-American Major League baseball player – Etobicoke
- Andrew Wiggins (born 1995) – NBA player – Toronto
- Nigel Wilson (born 1970) – Major League baseball player - Oshawa

== Politicians ==
- Laura Curran
- Philip Downing
- Stephen Harper – 22nd Prime Minister of Canada (2006–2015) and former Conservative Party leader – Leaside
- John T. Jarvis
- Michael Kerzner – Solicitor General of Ontario
- William Lyon Mackenzie King – 10th prime minister of Canada (1921–26, 1926–30, 1935–48), longest-serving prime minister in Canadian history – Berlin now Kitchener.
- Paul Martin – 21st prime minister of Canada (2003–2006) – Windsor
- James McMillan – Hamilton
- Lester B. Pearson – 14th prime minister of Canada (1963–1968) – Newtonbrook
- Justin Trudeau – 23rd prime minister of Canada (2015–2025) – Ottawa

== Olympic athletes ==
- Alex Baumann – Sudbury
- Nathan Brannen – Cambridge
- Patrick Chan – Ottawa
- Gabrielle Daleman – Newmarket
- Victor Davis – Guelph
- Meagan Duhamel – Sudbury
- Lori Dupuis – South Glengarry
- John Fitzpatrick – Toronto
- Chris Jarvis – Grimsby
- Becky Kellar – Hagersville
- Rosie MacLennan – King City
- Conlin McCabe – Brockville
- Scott Moir – London
- Penny Oleksiak – Toronto
- Brian Orser – Belleville
- Elvis Stojko – Richmond Hill
- Adam van Koeverden – Oakville
- Tessa Virtue – London
- Simon Whitfield – Kingston

== Other notable celebrities ==
- Thalia Assuras – London
- Samantha Bee – Toronto
- Gavin Michael Booth – Amherstburg
- William J. Bruce III – St. Catharines
- Don Cherry – Kingston
- William Winer Cooke – Brantford
- Adam Copeland – Orangeville
- Linda Evangelista – St. Catharines
- Melyssa Ford – Toronto
- Frank Gehry – Toronto
- Danielle Graham – Guelph
- Chris Hadfield – astronaut, Sarnia and Milton
- Shalom Harlow – Oshawa
- James Hobson – engineer and YouTuber, Kitchener
- Michiel Horn – Toronto
- Peter Jennings – Toronto
- Lynn Johnston – Collingwood
- Jason Jones – Hamilton
- Gail Kim – Toronto
- Lisa LaFlamme – Kitchener
- Ferdinand Larose – created the Larose Forest, Prescott and Russell
- Lainey Lui – Toronto
- Steve Mackall – Toronto
- Lorne Michaels – Toronto
- Daniel Negreanu – poker player, Toronto
- Kevin Newman – Toronto
- Jordan Peterson – professor, Toronto
- Quddus – Toronto
- James Randi – Toronto
- Ivan Reitman – Hamilton
- Jason Reso – Orangeville
- Sandie Rinaldo – Toronto
- John Roberts – Toronto
- Lloyd Robertson – Stratford
- Morley Safer – Toronto
- David Shore – London
- Lilly Singh – Toronto
- Trish Stratus – Richmond Hill
- John Saunders – sports reporter, from Ajax and other cities
- Alex Trebek – Sudbury
- Jack L. Warner – London
- Ken Westerfield – disc sports (Frisbee) pioneer, from Toronto
- Lauren Williams – Toronto

== Bands, musicians, singers, and rappers ==
- Lee Aaron – Belleville
- Annihilator (band) – Ottawa
- Bryan Adams – Kingston
- Alexisonfire – St. Catharines
- Paul Anka – Ottawa
- Eva Avila – Ottawa
- Barenaked Ladies – Scarborough
- Justin Bieber – Stratford
- Billy Talent – Mississauga
- Jully Black – Toronto
- Blue Rodeo – Toronto
- Broken Social Scene – Toronto
- Cancer Bats – Toronto
- Candi & The Backbeat – North York
- Alessia Cara – Mississauga
- Keshia Chanté – Ottawa
- Bruce Cockburn – Ottawa
- Deborah Cox – Toronto
- deadmau5 – Niagara Falls; real name Joel Thomas Zimmerman
- Hugh Dillon – Kingston
- Fefe Dobson – Scarborough
- Drake – Toronto
- Finger Eleven – Burlington
- Five Man Electrical Band – Ottawa
- J.D. Fortune – Mississauga
- Nelly Furtado – Forest Hill, Toronto
- Glenn Gould – Toronto
- Dallas Green – St. Catharines
- Hail the Villain – Oshawa
- Sarah Harmer – Burlington
- illScarlett – Mississauga
- Jeon Somi (born 2001) – Windsor
- Kardinal Offishall – Toronto
- Vikas Kohli – Mississauga
- James LaBrie – Penetanguishene
- Henry Lau – Toronto
- Avril Lavigne – Belleville and Greater Napanee
- Gordon Lightfoot – Orillia
- Lights – Timmins
- Little X – Toronto
- Guy Lombardo – London
- Brian Melo – Hamilton
- Shawn Mendes – Pickering
- Alice Merton – Oakville
- Metric – Toronto
- Kim Mitchell – Sarnia
- Alanis Morissette – Ottawa
- My Darkest Days – Toronto
- The Partland Brothers – Colgan
- One to One – Ottawa
- Our Lady Peace – Toronto
- Peaches – Toronto
- Protest the Hero – Whitby
- Anastasia Rizikov – Toronto
- Rush – Toronto
- Saga – Oakville
- Paul Shaffer – Thunder Bay
- Sheriff – Toronto
- Silverstein – Burlington
- Snow – Toronto
- Wendy Son – Richmond Hill
- Sum 41 – Ajax
- Skye Sweetnam – Bolton
- Teenage Head – Hamilton
- Three Days Grace – Toronto
- Tokyo Police Club – Newmarket
- The Tragically Hip – Kingston
- Shania Twain – Windsor
- U.S.S. (Ubiquitous Synergy Seeker) – Stouffville, Markham and Toronto
- Vanity – Niagara Falls
- Walk off the Earth – Burlington
- Tamia Washington – Windsor
- The Weeknd – Scarborough
- Michelle Wright – Merlin
- Neil Young – Toronto
- Daniel Caesar – Toronto

== Authors ==
- Margaret Atwood – Ottawa and Toronto
- James Cameron – Kapuskasing and Niagara Falls
- Julie Czerneda – Mississauga
- Robertson Davies – Thamesville
- William Arthur Deacon – Pembroke
- Earl Doherty – Ottawa
- J. S. Ewart (1849–1933) – advocate for Canadian independence, from Toronto
- Malcolm Gladwell – Kitchener-Waterloo
- Alistair MacLeod – Windsor
- Alice Munro (1931–2024) – Wingham
- Michael Ondaatje – Toronto
- Robert J. Sawyer – Mississauga
- Clara E. Speight-Humberston – Acton
- Eric Walters – Toronto

== Scientists and physicians ==
- Sir Frederick Banting – co-discoverer of insulin
- Charles Best – co-discoverer of insulin
- Norman Bethune – physician, pioneered the use of in-field blood transfusions during the Spanish Civil War, joined the Communist guerillas in China in the 1930s
- Roberta Bondar – astronaut, neurologist, from Sault Ste. Marie
- Robert Buckman – oncologist, president of Humanist Association of Canada
- Mathew Evans – inventor, created and patented the first incandescent light bulb in 1874, five years before Thomas Edison's US patent
- Wilbur Franks – physician and inventor; developed first anti-gravity or "G-suit" now used by air crews and astronauts; also noted for his work in cancer research
- James Naismith – physician, inventor of basketball
- Daniel David Palmer – founder of chiropractic

== Businesspeople ==
Name	Notable for	Connection to Ontario
Henry Corby (1806–1881)	Founder of Corby Spirit and Wine	lived in Belleville from 1832 until his death in 1881
William Pratt (1928–1999)	1988 XV Winter Olympics organizer, Calgary contractor	born in Ottawa
Michael Rapino	CEO and President of Live Nation Entertainment	raised in Thunder Bay
Howard Wetston (born 1947)	Chairman of the Ontario Securities Commission	
William R. White (born 1943)	Economist, chaired the Economic and Development Review Committee at the Organisation for Economic Co-operation and Development (OECD) in Paris	born in Kenora

== Criminals ==
- Paul Bernardo
- Edwin Alonzo Boyd – led the Boyd Gang in Toronto
- Karla Homolka
- Mahmoud Mohammad Issa Mohammad – Palestinian former member of the Popular Front for the Liberation of Palestine; deported
- Johnny Papalia

== Others ==
- Margaret Hyndman – lawyer and women's rights advocate

== See also ==
- List of people from Toronto
- List of University of Toronto people
