= Erika Alexander =

American actress (born 1969)

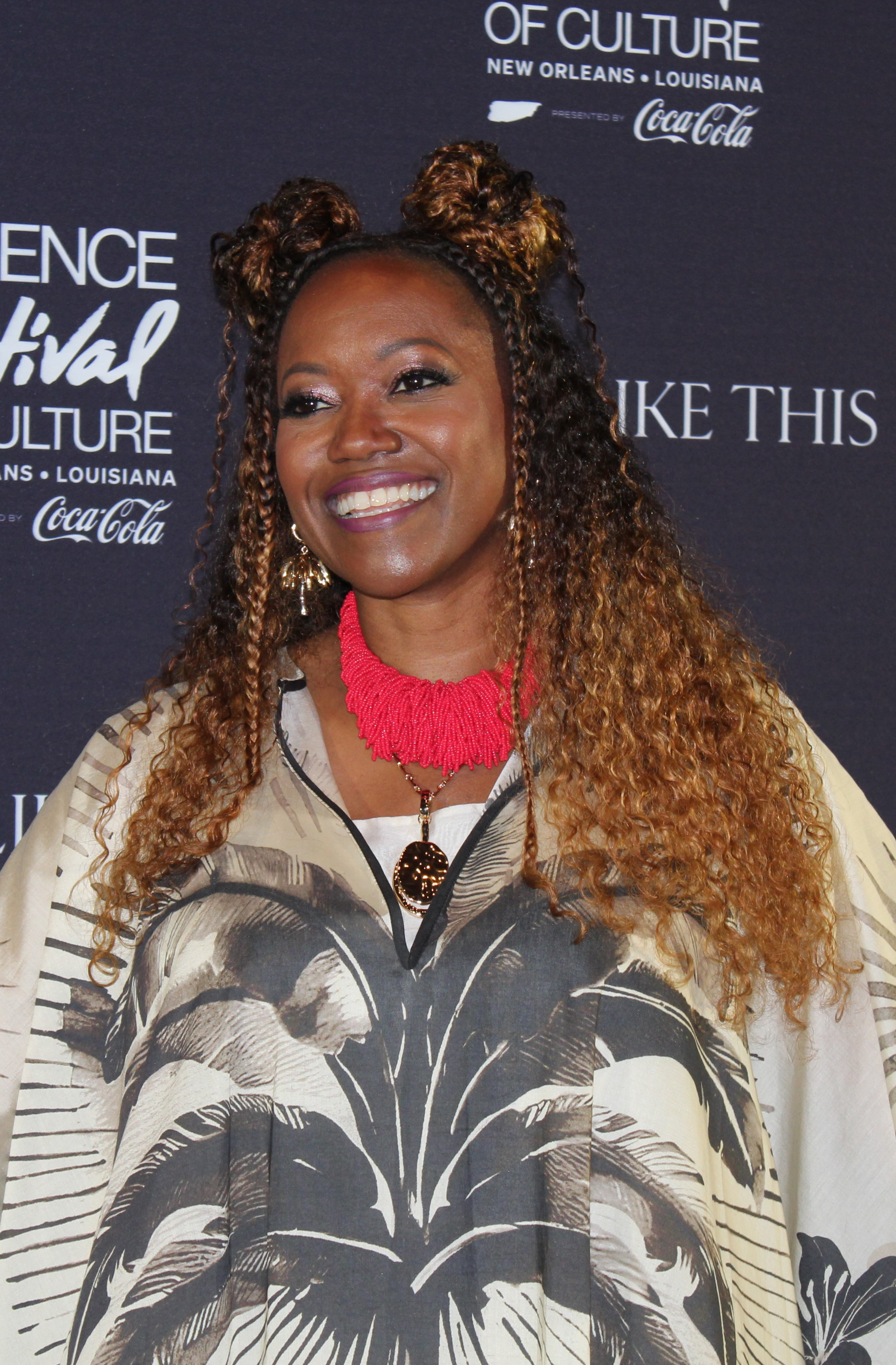
- Erika Alexander at Essence Festival of Culture in July 2025
- Born: Erika Rose Alexander; November 19, 1969 (age 56); Winslow, Arizona, U.S.
- Occupations: Actress; writer; producer; activist
- Years active: 1986–present
- Spouse: Tony Puryear (m. 1997; div. 2017)
- Awards: 1996 – NAACP Image Award; Outstanding Actress in a Comedy Series (Living Single); 1998 – NAACP Image Award; Outstanding Actress in a Comedy Series (Living Single)
- Website: www.erikaalexander.com

Erika Rose Alexander (born November 19, 1969) is an American actress, writer, producer, entrepreneur and activist who played the roles of Pam Tucker on the NBC sitcom The Cosby Show from 1990 to 1992, and Maxine Shaw on the Fox sitcom Living Single from 1993 to 1998. She has won numerous awards for her work on Living Single, including two NAACP Image Awards for Outstanding Actress in a Comedy Series. Her film credits include The Long Walk Home (1990), 30 Years to Life (2001), Déjà Vu (2006), Get Out (2017), American Refugee (2021), Earth Mama (2023) and American Fiction (2023), for which she was nominated for an Independent Spirit Award for Best Supporting Performance.

== Early life ==
Alexander was born on November 19, 1969, in Winslow, Arizona, and raised in Flagstaff, Arizona, until age eleven, when she and her family moved to Philadelphia, Pennsylvania. She is one of six children born to Robert and Sammie Alexander, a schoolteacher and a children's book author, respectively. She graduated from Philadelphia High School for Girls.

== Acting career ==
Alexander was discovered at 14 by independent film company Merchant Ivory when she was attending the fifth week of a six-week summer acting class at the New Freedom Theatre. Her first major film role was that of Joan in 1986's My Little Girl. In 1989, she played Madri/Hidimbaa in Peter Brook's nine-hour epic play adaptation of The Mahabharata. She was also cast in Bill Gunn's The Forbidden City, the last play directed by Public Theater impresario Joseph Papp. The play also starred Gloria Foster, Frankie Faison and Akili Prince.

In 1990, Alexander starred opposite Whoopi Goldberg in the civil rights epic drama film The Long Walk Home. She was then cast as Pam Tucker on the NBC sitcom The Cosby Show, starring on the series from 1990 until the show's finale in 1992. That same year, Alexander starred in the ABC comedy-drama series Going to Extremes, which centered on a group of American students at a medical school on a fictitious Caribbean island named Jantique. The series was canceled after one season in early 1993.

Later in 1993, Alexander began starring as attorney Maxine Shaw in the Fox sitcom Living Single, a role she played for five years until 1998. For this role, Alexander won two NAACP Image Awards for Outstanding Actress in a Comedy Series in 1996 and 1998. In 1996, she also made a cameo appearance in Toni Braxton's music video for her song "You're Makin' Me High".

In 1998, Alexander starred as "Young Flora", acting along with Cicely Tyson and her former Living Single co-star Queen Latifah, in the CBS miniseries Mama Flora's Family, based on a novel by Alex Haley. She also appeared in the 1998 drama film 54. In 2001, Alexander starred in the comedy film 30 Years to Life, receiving a Black Reel Award for Best Independent Actress for her performance.

In 2002, Alexander played probation officer Dee Mulhern in the Showtime drama series Street Time, which ran for two seasons. She had recurring roles in Judging Amy, In Plain Sight, Low Winter Sun and Let's Stay Together. Alexander also guest-starred on Law & Order: Special Victims Unit, Half & Half,7th Heaven (TV series), ER, CSI: Crime Scene Investigation, Criminal Minds, House, Suits and Grey's Anatomy. Additionally, she appeared in a number of films during the 2000s and 2010s. In 2006, Alexander played the role of Shanti, a technical science engineer in the science fiction action film Deja Vu opposite Denzel Washington. She later starred opposite Benjamin Bratt and Jeremy Ray Valdez in the 2009 drama film La Mission.

From 2012 to 2015, Alexander had a recurring role as Carol Larabee, Mike and Vanessa's neighbor, in the ABC comedy series Last Man Standing. Tisha Campbell-Martin replaced her in the role during the show's seventh season. In 2014, Alexander had a supporting role in the comedy-drama Elsa & Fred starring Shirley MacLaine and Christopher Plummer. In 2017, she played Detective Latoya in the horror film Get Out.

From 2016 to 2017, Alexander starred as Constance Irving in the Amazon drama Bosch. She had recurring roles in the Oprah Winfrey Network drama series Queen Sugar in 2016 and Freeform fantasy drama Beyond from 2017 to 2018. In 2018, she was cast in a recurring role as Perenna in the CW superhero series Black Lightning. She received an NAACP Image Award nomination in 2019 for Outstanding Guest Performance in a Comedy or Drama Series. Also in 2019, Alexander began starring in the Hulu drama series, Wu-Tang: An American Saga. In 2021, she began appearing in a recurring role in the Starz comedy series, Run the World. The following year, she starred in The Roku Channel drama series, Swimming with Sharks.

Alexander appeared in the 2019 horror-thriller film I See You and played the lead in the Blumhouse horror-thriller American Refugee (2021). She later appeared in the comedy-drama film, Wildflower, and the drama film Earth Mama. In 2023, she starred opposite Jeffrey Wright in American Fiction. She received an Independent Spirit Award for Best Supporting Performance nomination for her performance.

In May 2025 it was announced that Alexander would star in the Tina Fey-produced television series The Fall and Rise of Reggie Dinkins alongside Tracy Morgan and Daniel Radcliffe.

== Writing and publishing ==
In 2012, Alexander co-created and co-wrote a science-fiction graphic novel, Concrete Park, with then-husband Tony Puryear. In 2018, she penned season eleven of the Buffy the Vampire Slayer comic Giles with Buffy creator Joss Whedon. In 2023, she created and co-wrote the Dupont Columbia Award-winning Audible true-crime series Finding Tamika.

Alexander is a co-founder (with Ben Arnon) of Color Farm Media, an entertainment, innovation, and social impact company; in 2020, they released John Lewis: Good Trouble, a documentary focusing on civil rights leader John Lewis.

== Political activity ==
Alexander actively campaigned for Hillary Clinton and toured college campuses with Chelsea Clinton during the 2008 Democratic Party primary.

== Personal life ==
From 1997 to 2017, Alexander was married to artist and screenwriter Tony Puryear.

== Filmography ==
=== Film ===
Year	Title	Role	Notes
1986	My Little Girl	Joan	
1990	The Long Walk Home	Selma Cotter	
1991	He Said, She Said	Rita	
1992	Fathers & Sons	Venell	
1998	54	Ciel	
2001	30 Years to Life	Joy	
2002	Love Liza	Brenda	
2002	Full Frontal	Lucy	
2004	Tricks	Laurel	
2006	Déjà Vu	Shanti	
2009	La Mission	Lena	
2014	Elsa & Fred	Laverne	
2014	Secrets of the Magic City	Ms. Fletcher	
2016	Undone	Andrea Rose	Short
2016	Brave New Jersey	Helen Holbrook	
2017	Get Out	Detective Latoya	
2019	I See You	Lieutenant Moriah Davis	
2021	American Refugee	Helen Taylor	
2022	Wildflower	Mary	
2023	Earth Mama	Miss Carmen	
2023	American Fiction	Coraline	
2026	Is God Is	Divine The Healer	

=== Television ===
Year	Title	Role	Notes
1986	ABC Afterschool Special	-	Episode: "Teen Father"
1986	George Washington II: The Forging of a Nation	Oney	TV movie
1989	The Mahabharata	Madri/Hidimbaa	Main cast
1990	Common Ground	Cassandra Twymon	Episode: "Part I & II"
1990	Law & Order	Doris Carver	Episode: "Poison Ivy"
1990	The Last Best Year	Amy	TV movie
1990–92	The Cosby Show	Pam Tucker	Main cast (season 7–8)
1992–93	Going to Extremes	Cheryl Carter	Main cast
1993–98	Living Single	Maxine "Max" Felice Shaw	Main cast
1994	Override	Shawana	TV movie
1998	Mama Flora's Family	Young Flora	2 episodes
2001	The Zeta Project	Agent Rush (voice)	Recurring cast (season 1)
2001	Judging Amy	Fran Winston	Recurring cast (season 2–3)
2002–03	Street Time	Dee Mulhern	Main cast
2004	Law & Order: Special Victims Unit	Kema Mabuda	Episode: "Ritual"
2004	LAX	Allison	Episode: "Thanksgiving"
2005	Half & Half	Maxine Shaw	Episode: "The Big Performance Anxiety Episode"
2005	7th Heaven	Lynn Miles	Episode: "Leaps of Faith"
2006	In Justice	Alyssa Hill	Episode: "The Ten Percenter"
2006	Heist	Saundra Johnson	Recurring cast
2006	ER	Vatima Abika	Episode: "No Place to Hide"
2007	Side Order of Life	Colette	Episode: "Pilot"
2007	CSI: Crime Scene Investigation	A.D.A. Kirkson	Episode: "The Case of the Cross-Dressing Carp"
2007	Numb3rs	U.S. Marshal Tricia Yaegger	Episode: "In Security"
2007	CSI: Miami	Tanya Thorpe	Episode: "Guerillas in the Mist"
2009	Criminal Minds	Detective Lynne Henderson	Episode: "The Big Wheel"
2010	In Plain Sight	Theresa Simmons	Recurring cast (season 3)
2011	House	Ms. Fields	Episode: "Two Stories"
2012	Suburgatory	Gloria	Episode: "The Motherload"
2012	Suits	Sarah Layton	Episode: "Discovery"
2012–15	Last Man Standing	Carol Larabee	Recurring cast (season 2–5)
2013	Low Winter Sun	Louise "LC" Cullen	Recurring cast
2014	Let's Stay Together	Blanche	Recurring cast (season 4)
2014	NCIS: New Orleans	Navy Commander Louanne Bates	Episode: "Carrier"
2015	Grey's Anatomy	Johanna McKay	Episode: "Crazy Love"
2016	Recovery Road	Trish's Mother	Episode: "My Loose Thread"
2016	Queen Sugar	LeAnne	Recurring cast (season 1)
2016–17	Bosch	Connie Irving	Recurring cast (season 2–3)
2017–18	Beyond	Tess Shoemaker	Recurring cast
2018	Insecure	Yolanda	Recurring cast (season 3)
2018–19	Black Lightning	Perenna	Recurring cast (season 2)
2019–23	Wu-Tang: An American Saga	Linda Diggs	Main cast (season 1), recurring cast (season 2–3)
2021–23	Run the World	Barb	Recurring cast
2022	Swimming with Sharks	Meredith	Main cast
2022	Shining Girls	Abby	Recurring cast
2023	Black Pop: Celebrating the Power of Black Culture	Herself	Episode: "Film"
2025–present	Invasion	Verna	Main cast (season 3)
2026	The Fall and Rise of Reggie Dinkins	Monica Reese-Dinkins	Main cast

=== Music videos ===
Year	Artist	Song	Role
1996	Toni Braxton	"You're Makin' Me High"	Friend

== Awards and nominations ==
Year	Awards	Category	Recipient	Outcome
1996	NAACP Image Awards	NAACP Image Award for Outstanding Actress in a Comedy Series	Living Single	Won
1997	NAACP Image Awards	NAACP Image Award for Outstanding Actress in a Comedy Series	Living Single	Nominated
2002	Black Reel Awards	Black Reel Award for Best Independent Actress	30 Years to Life	Won
2017	Phoenix Film Festival	Phoenix Film Festival Award for Best Ensemble Acting	Brave New Jersey	Won
2019	NAACP Image Awards	NAACP Image Award for Outstanding Guest Performance in a Comedy or Drama Series	Black Lightning	Nominated
2022	NAACP Image Awards	NAACP Image Award for Outstanding Guest Actor or Actress in a Television Series	Run the World	Nominated
2023	Screen Actors Guild Awards	Outstanding Performance by a Cast in a Motion Picture	American Fiction	Nominated
2026	Black Reel Awards	Black Reel Award for Outstanding Supporting Performance in a Comedy Series	The Fall and Rise of Reggie Dinkins	Won
