= Mission Park (film) =

- Directed by: Bryan Ramirez
- Written by: Bryan Ramirez
- Produced by: Douglas Spain
- Starring: Jeremy Ray Valdez; Walter Perez; Will Rothhaar; Joseph Julian Soria; Fernanda Romero
- Cinematography: L. Thomas Nador
- Edited by: Yusef Svacina
- Music by: Stephen Barton
- Production company: Armando Montelongo Productions
- Release dates: 23 February 2013 (Ciné-Festival); 13 September 2013 (US)
- Running time: 100 minutes
- Country: United States
- Language: English

Mission Park (alternatively titled Line of Duty) is a 2013 American thriller drama film directed by Bryan Ramirez, starring Jeremy Ray Valdez, Walter Perez, Will Rothhaar, Joseph Julian Soria and Fernanda Romero.

== Cast ==
- Jeremy Ray Valdez as Bobby
  - Jeremy Becerra as Young Bobby
- Walter Perez as Jason
  - Bryce Cass as Young Jason
- Will Rothhaar as Julian
  - Austin Brock as Young Julian
- Joseph Julian Soria as Derek
  - Alonzo Lara as Young Derek
- Fernanda Romero as Gina
- Sean Patrick Flanery as The Captain
- Will Estes as The Dealer
- Jesse Borrego as Mr. Ramirez
- Vivica A. Fox as Agent Montelogo
- Douglas Spain as Agent Ortiz
- Julio Cesar Cedillo as Detective Rodriguez
- David Phillips as Detective Brent Jones

== Release ==
The film received a limited theatrical release on 13 September 2013.

== Reception ==
The Hollywood Reporter wrote that the despite the "reasonably effective" performances, the film is "unconvincing from start to finish, with the director relying on so many helicopter shots of the San Antonio skyline that it begins to resemble something that might have been produced by the city’s tourist bureau."

Jeannette Catsoulis of The New York Times wrote that the film is "stuffed with men who think only with their fists, feet and parts in between."

Scott Foundas of Variety wrote that while the film "doesn’t lack ambition", it "lays everything on far too thick", and the performances are "mostly stiff".

Gary Goldstein of the Los Angeles Times wrote that the "talented quartet of young actors can't surmount the wall-to-wall clichés that comprise “Mission Park,” an earnest, not terribly convincing action thriller as generic as its title."
