= David Phillips (actor) =

Canadian actor and producer (born 1978)

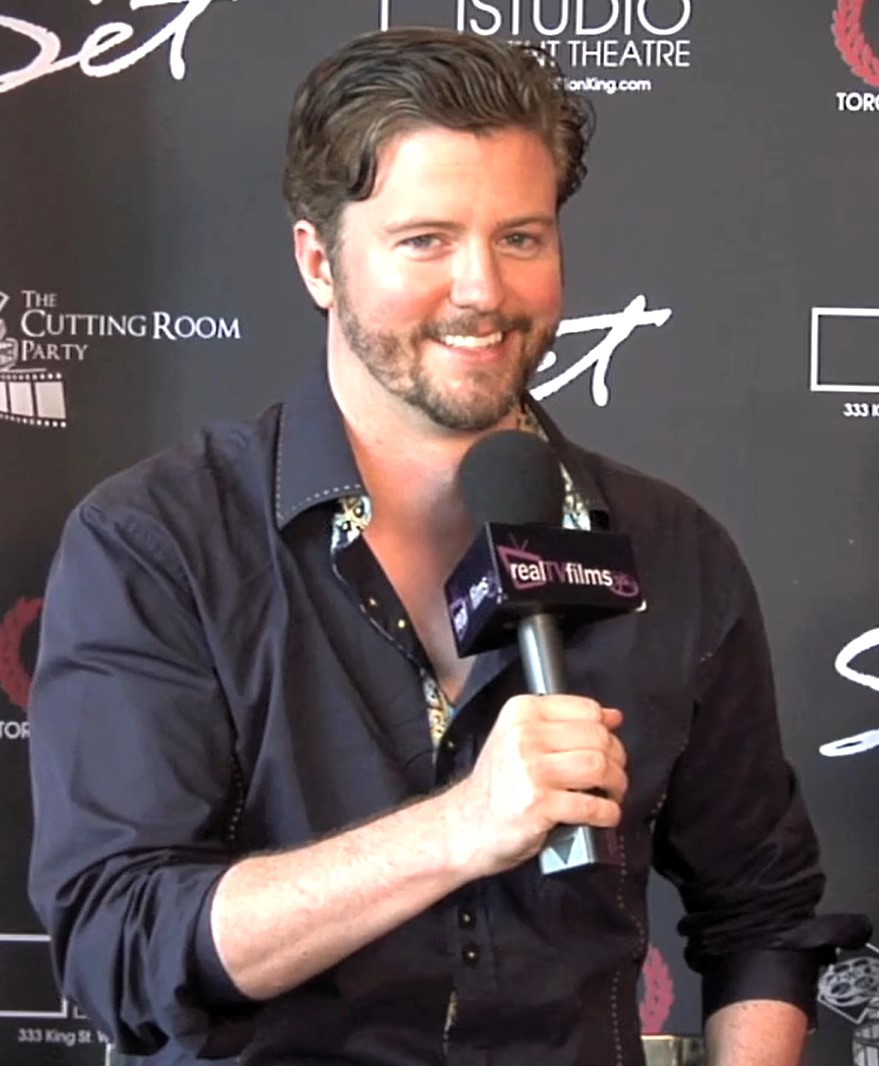
- Phillips interviewed at the 2014 Toronto International Film Festival
- Born: David Joseph Phillips; April 19, 1978 (age 47); Brampton, Ontario, Canada
- Occupation(s): actor, producer
- Years active: 2000–present

David Joseph Phillips (born April 19, 1978) is a Canadian actor and producer best known for starring in numerous theatrical performances in Toronto and at the Stratford Festival, hosting Video & Arcade Top 10 and The Miss Canada Pageant. He is also known for acting in the films Poker Night, Shark City, Green Guys and Re-Generator, and then producing and acting in Life Happens , Moments of Clarity, Amateur Night, Mission Park, The Maestro and Eat Wheaties!.

== Early life and education ==
Phillips was born in Brampton, Ontario, to Margaret and James Phillips. He was raised in Brampton, Ontario, attending high school at St. Thomas Aquinas Secondary School (Brampton). He was then admitted with a scholarship into Ryerson Theatre School in Toronto, where he received his BFA, and played the lead in his graduate production of Henry IV directed by John Neville.

== Career ==
After graduating he took a brief hiatus from performing and was a ninth grade math and geography teacher at his old high school in Brampton. He went back to entertainment in 2000, when he co-hosted the Canadian kids game show Video & Arcade Top 10 for two years. He was then part of the classical acting company at The Stratford Festival of Canada for the next three years, where he appeared in eight productions, and received a Tyrone Guthrie award for his efforts. He then returned to the Greater Toronto Area, where he performed in many classical theatre productions, including playing Estragon in the well-received Waiting For Godot, as well as the Canadian Premiere of Mephisto

David appeared in the independent feature films Winter and Poker Night in Toronto. Upon moving to Los Angeles in 2008 he was immediately cast to play the lead role in Shark City with Vivica A. Fox and Corey Haim. Since then he has booked steady work in Hollywood films. In 2010, he acted as a lead role in both the films Ecstasy and Green Guys (opposite fellow Bramptonian Kris Lemche), appeared opposite Lisa Nova in the YouTube video Fantasy Pool Date. Though he lives in Los Angeles, he still returns to Toronto to work often, and hosted the 2008 Miss World Canada Pageant.

In 2010, he helped produce three films with Stardust Pictures which he also acted in - Boy Toy, A Holiday Heist, and Life Happens with Krysten Ritter, Kate Bosworth, and Rachel Bilson.

In 2013 David produced a Latino crime-thriller called Mission Park that was awarded Best Film honors at international film festivals in Boston, Miami, East L.A., Houston, and Las Vegas. It features Sean Patrick Flanery, Vivica A. Fox, Will Estes, Joseph Julian Soria, and Will Rothhaar and he helped secure the theatrical release September 2013 through AMC Theatres. In 2013 David created his own production company called 'Phillm Productions' which has produced four feature films: Moments of Clarity starring Lyndsy Fonseca, Eric Roberts and Mackenzie Astin, Badsville starring Emilio Rivera and Robert Knepper, The Maestro starring Xander Berkeley and Jon Polito, and Eat Wheaties! starring Tony Hale, Elisha Cuthbert, and Paul Walter Hauser. During the pandemic of 2020, David worked as a producer of various rom-coms in Canada including Hallmark's "The Love Club" series before Executive Producing Hot Seat starring Mel Gibson and Kevin Dillon and Savage Salvation starring Robert De Niro, John Malkovich, and Jack Huston. In 2024, he produced Canadian films Last County starring Nicholas Campbell as well as All the Lost Ones starring Devon Sawa.

== Filmography ==
=== Feature films ===
- Winter (2007)
- Poker Night (2008)
- Three Shades of Black (2009)
- Shark City (2009)
- Ecstasy (2010)
- Green Guys (2010)
- Boy Toy (2011)
- One Night (2011)
- Life Happens (2011)
- A Holiday Heist (2011)
- Re-generator (2013)
- Mission Park (2013)
- Moments of Clarity (2015)
- Amateur Night (2016)
- Badsville (2017)
- The Maestro (2018)
- Eat Wheaties! (2020)
- Hot Seat (2022)
- Savage Salvation (2022)
- Last County (2024)
- All the Lost Ones (2024)

=== TV ===
- Video & Arcade Top 10 (2000-2001) TV series - co-host
- A Beaver Tale (2005) TV pilot - lead
- Miss Canada Globe Pageant (2005-2009) - host
- Johnny (2007) TV pilot - lead
- Miss World Canada (2008) - host
- The Love Club series (2023) - producer
- The Love Club Moms series (2024) - producer

=== Theatre ===
- "The Mousetrap" (2000) - Toronto Truck Theatre
- "Mephisto" - Canadian Premiere (2001) - Harbourfront Centre, Toronto
- Stratford Festival of Canada Company Member (2002–2005):
  - All's Well That Ends Well
  - The Scarlet Pimpernel
  - The White Devil
  - A Midsummer Night's Dream
  - The Birds
  - Quiet In The Land
  - Macbeth
  - Henry VIII
- "Waiting For Godot" (2004) - Heritage Theatre
- "Rosencrantz and Guildenstern Are Dead" (2005) - Heritage Theatre
- "Twelfth Night" (2006) - Heritage Theatre
- "Much Ado About Nothing" (2006) - Rose Theatre
- "The Complete Works of William Shakespeare (Abridged)" (2007) - Rose Theatre
- "Dancing at Lughnasa" (2007) - The Annex, Toronto Theatre

== Awards and honours ==
- 1997 Ryerson Entrance Scholarship
- 2003 Stratford Tyrone Guthrie Award
