= Satellite Award for Best Cast – Motion Picture =

Annual film award

Satellite Award for Best Cast
- Awarded for: Best Cast
- Country: United States
- Presented by: International Press Academy
- First award: 1997
- Currently held by: Wake Up Dead Man: A Knives Out Mystery (2025)

The Satellite Award for Best Cast (or Best Ensemble) in a Motion Picture is one of the Satellite Awards given by the International Press Academy since 2004. It superseded the late 1990s award title Outstanding Motion Picture Ensemble.

== Recipients ==
=== 1990s ===
Outstanding Motion Picture Ensemble

| Year | Film | Recipients |
|---|---|---|
| 1997 | Boogie Nights | Don Cheadle • Robert Downey Sr. • Heather Graham • Luis Guzmán • Philip Baker Hall • Nina Hartley • Philip Seymour Hoffman • Michael Jace • Thomas Jane • William H. Macy • Alfred Molina • Julianne Moore • Michael Penn • John C. Reilly • Burt Reynolds • Robert Ridgely • Mark Wahlberg |
| 1998 | The Thin Red Line | Kirk Acevedo • Penelope Allen • Adrien Brody • Jim Caviezel • Ben Chaplin • George Clooney • John Cusack • Woody Harrelson • John Savage • Elias Koteas • Jared Leto • Dash Mihok • Tim Blake Nelson • Nick Nolte • Miranda Otto • Sean Penn • John C. Reilly • Nick Stahl • John Travolta |
| 1999 | Magnolia | Jeremy Blackman • Michael Bowen • Tom Cruise • Melinda Dillon • Henry Gibson • April Grace • Luis Guzmán • Philip Baker Hall • Philip Seymour Hoffman • Felicity Huffman • Thomas Jane • Ricky Jay • Emmanuel Johnson • William H. Macy • Alfred Molina • Julianne Moore • Michael Murphy • John C. Reilly • Jason Robards • Eileen Ryan • Melora Walters |

=== 2000s ===
Outstanding Motion Picture Ensemble

| Year | Film | Recipients |
|---|---|---|
| 2000 | Traffic | Steven Bauer • James Brolin • Don Cheadle • Erika Christensen • Clifton Collins Jr. • Benicio del Toro • Majandra Delfino • Michael Douglas • Miguel Ferrer • Topher Grace • Luis Guzmán • Salma Hayek • Tomas Milian • D. W. Moffett • Dennis Quaid • Tucker Smallwood • Jacob Vargas • Catherine Zeta-Jones |
| 2001 | Gosford Park | Eileen Atkins • Bob Balaban • Alan Bates • Charles Dance • Stephen Fry • Michael Gambon • Richard E. Grant • Tom Hollander • Derek Jacobi • Kelly Macdonald • Helen Mirren • Jeremy Northam • Clive Owen • Ryan Phillippe • Kristin Scott Thomas • Maggie Smith • Geraldine Somerville • Sophie Thompson • Emily Watson • James Wilby |
| 2002 | The Lord of the Rings: The Two Towers | Sean Astin • John Bach • Cate Blanchett • Orlando Bloom • Billy Boyd • Brad Dourif • Bernard Hill • Bruce Hopkins • Christopher Lee • John Leigh • Ian McKellen • Dominic Monaghan • Viggo Mortensen • Miranda Otto • Craig Parker • John Rhys-Davies • Andy Serkis • Liv Tyler • Karl Urban • Hugo Weaving • David Wenham • Elijah Wood |

Best Cast (or Ensemble)

| Year | Film | Recipients |
|---|---|---|
| 2004 | Sideways | Thomas Haden Church • Paul Giamatti • Virginia Madsen • Sandra Oh |
| 2005 | Crash | Chris Bridges • Sandra Bullock • Don Cheadle • Matt Dillon • Jennifer Esposito • William Fichtner • Brendan Fraser • Terrence Howard • Thandiwe Newton • Ryan Phillippe • Larenz Tate |
| 2006 | The Departed | Anthony Anderson • Alec Baldwin • Matt Damon • Leonardo DiCaprio • Vera Farmiga • Jack Nicholson • Martin Sheen • Mark Wahlberg • Ray Winstone |
| 2007 | Before the Devil Knows You're Dead | Albert Finney • Rosemary Harris • Ethan Hawke • Philip Seymour Hoffman • Brían F. O'Byrne • Amy Ryan • Michael Shannon • Marisa Tomei |
| 2008 | No Award | |
| 2009 | Nine | Daniel Day-Lewis • Marion Cotillard • Penélope Cruz • Judi Dench • Fergie • Kate Hudson • Nicole Kidman • Sophia Loren |

=== 2010s ===
| Year | Film | Recipients |
|---|---|---|
| 2010 | No Award | |
| 2011 | The Help | Anna Camp • Jessica Chastain • Viola Davis • Nelsan Ellis • Bryce Dallas Howard • Dana Ivey • Allison Janney • Leslie Jordan • Brian Kerwin • Chris Lowell • Ahna O'Reilly • David Oyelowo • Sissy Spacek • Octavia Spencer • Mary Steenburgen • Emma Stone • Cicely Tyson • Mike Vogel |
| 2012 | Les Miserábles | Samantha Barks • Sacha Baron Cohen • Helena Bonham Carter • Russell Crowe • Anne Hathaway • Hugh Jackman • Eddie Redmayne • Amanda Seyfried |
| 2013 | Nebraska | Bruce Dern • Will Forte • June Squibb • Stacy Keach • Bob Odenkirk • Mary Louise Wilson • Missy Doty • Angela McEwan • Rance Howard • Devin Ratray • Melinda Simonsen • Roger Stuckwisch |
| 2014 | Into the Woods | Christine Baranski • Tammy Blanchard • Emily Blunt • James Corden • Lilla Crawford • Frances de la Tour • Johnny Depp • Daniel Huttlestone • Anna Kendrick • Billy Magnussen • MacKenzie Mauzy • Chris Pine • Lucy Punch • Meryl Streep • Tracey Ullman |
| 2015 | Spotlight | Brian d'Arcy James • Michael Keaton • Rachel McAdams • Mark Ruffalo • Liev Schreiber • John Slattery • Stanley Tucci |
| 2016 | Hidden Figures | Mahershala Ali • Kevin Costner • Kirsten Dunst • Taraji P. Henson • Aldis Hodge • Janelle Monáe • Jim Parsons • Glen Powell • Kimberly Quinn • Octavia Spencer |
| 2017 | Mudbound | Jonathan Banks • Mary J. Blige • Jason Clarke • Garrett Hedlund • Jason Mitchell • Rob Morgan • Carey Mulligan |
| 2018 | The Favourite | Olivia Colman • Rachel Weisz • Emma Stone • Nicholas Hoult • Joe Alwyn |
| 2019 | Knives Out | |

=== 2020s ===
| Year | Film | Recipients |
|---|---|---|
| 2020 | The Trial of the Chicago 7 | |
| 2021 | The Power of the Dog | Benedict Cumberbatch • Kirsten Dunst • Jesse Plemons • Kodi Smit-McPhee • Thomasin McKenzie • Genevieve Lemon • Keith Carradine • Frances Conroy • Peter Carroll • Alison Bruce • Sean Keenan • Adam Beach • Alice Englert • Maeson Stone Skuccedal |
| 2022 | Glass Onion: A Knives Out Mystery | Daniel Craig • Edward Norton • Janelle Monáe • Kathryn Hahn • Leslie Odom Jr. • Kate Hudson • Dave Bautista • Jessica Henwick • Madelyn Cline • Noah Segan • Jackie Hoffman • Dallas Roberts • Ethan Hawke • Hugh Grant • Stephen Sondheim • Natasha Lyonne • Adam Davenport • Kareem Abdul-Jabbar • Serena Williams • Yo-Yo Ma • Angela Lansbury |
| 2023 | Oppenheimer | Cillian Murphy • Emily Blunt • Matt Damon • Robert Downey Jr. • Florence Pugh • Josh Hartnett • Casey Affleck • Rami Malek • Kenneth Branagh • Benny Safdie • Jason Clarke • Dylan Arnold • Tom Conti • James D'Arcy • David Dastmalchian • Dane DeHaan • Alden Ehrenreich |
| 2024 | Nosferatu | Bill Skarsgård • Nicholas Hoult • Lily-Rose Depp • Aaron Taylor-Johnson • Emma Corrin • Willem Dafoe |
| 2025 | Wake Up Dead Man: A Knives Out Mystery | |
