= Jesse Borrego =

American actor

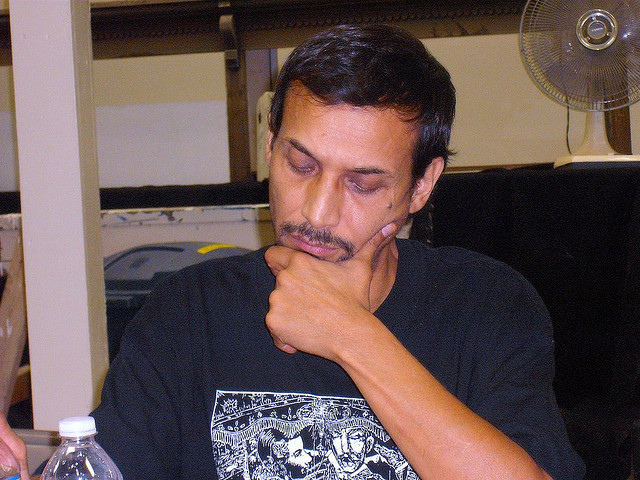
- Borrego in 2009
- Born: San Antonio, Texas, U.S.
- Occupation: Actor
- Years active: 1984–present
- Spouse: Valeria Hernandez
- Children: 1

Jesse Borrego is an American actor best known for his roles as Cruz Candelaria in Blood In Blood Out, Jesse V. Velasquez in Fame, Gael Ortega in 24, and George King in Dexter.

== Early life ==
Jesse Borrego was born in San Antonio, Texas, to Gloria Flores and Jesse Borrego Sr., an accordion player and singer of conjunto Mexican music. Jesse is the second oldest of five children: Gloria Marina, James, Georgina, and Grace. As a youth Jesse often danced with his sister Marina entering and winning several dance contests. Borrego lived with his grandparents during his high school years. He considered going into the US Air Force to become a pilot but pursued an acting career instead because it came naturally to him. After graduating from Harlandale High School, he attended University of the Incarnate Word, studying theater and dance, and The California Institute of the Arts alongside actor Don Cheadle. He earned a degree in Performance in 1984. About the same time, he attended an open audition for the TV Series Fame where he won the role of "Jesse Velasquez" for seasons 4, 5 and 6 from 1984-1987.

== Career ==
Borrego was a regular on the musical television series Fame for the show's final three seasons from 1984-1987. He appeared on Married... with Children as Bruno in the episode "Can't Dance, Don't Ask Me" (1989).

Borrego portrayed the artist named Cruz Candelaria in the Blood In Blood Out, the 1993 film directed by Taylor Hackford. He became a good friend of Adan Hernandez, the San Antonio based artist who created the paintings utilized in the film.

Borrego appeared in productions at the Joseph Papp Theatre in New York City and the Mark Taper Forum in Los Angeles. In addition to performing on stage and in films such as Mi Vida Loca, Follow Me Home, New York Stories, and Con Air, he began Lupita Productions in 1990. He has produced theatrical productions and concerts as well as two 16mm short films: El Suendo de Simon (1993) by James Borrego and Flattime (1995) by Jimmy Santiago Baca. He also played the role of an original gangster on DarkRoom Familia's "Veteranos" in 1999. Borrego is a member of the theatre group "Tribal Players." He had recurring roles during the third season of 24 as Gael Ortega and the third season of Dexter as George King. In 2009, Borrego starred in the movie La Mission, where he reunited with former Blood In Blood Out co-star Benjamin Bratt.

Borrego has also had his hand in directing. Borrego directed the no-budget indie film Closer to Bottom, which premiered at the inaugural Austin Indie Fest in November 2017. The movie won an award for Best Made in Texas Feature Film.

== Filmography ==
=== Film ===
Year	Title	Role	Notes
1989	New York Stories	Reuben Toro	
1991	Before the Storm	Sam	TV movie
1993	Blood In Blood Out	Cruz Candelaria	
1993	Mi Vida Loca	Juan "El Duran" Temido	
1994	I Like It Like That	Alexis	
1994	Bienvenido Welcome	Dario/Jijio	
1995	Tecumseh: The Last Warrior	Tecumseh	TV movie
1996	Follow Me Home	Tudee	
1996	Dalva	Duane Stonehorse	TV movie
1996	Lone Star	Danny	
1997	Retroactive	Jesse	
1997	Con Air	Francisco Cindino	
1997	The Maker	Felice A. Beato	
1998	Veteranos	Santo	
1999	The Darkest Day	Jonathan	TV movie
2000	Hell Swarm	Darius	TV movie
2000	A Lowrider Spring Break En San Quilmas	Sonny Gutierrez	
2001	Come and Take it Day	Jesse	
2003	The Maldonado Miracle	Hector Maldonado	TV movie
2003	The Shadow Chaser	-	Short
2003	Scooby-Doo! and the Monster of Mexico	Luis Otero (voice)	Video
2005	The New World	Pepaschicher	
2008	The Bookie	Jesus	
2009	La Mission	Rene	
2010	Dream Healing	Marco	
2011	Colombiana	Fabio Restrepo	
2013	Mission Park	Mr. Ramirez	
2013	Go for Sisters	Juan Calles	
2013	Wappo vs the World	Jesse	Short
2014	Shut Out: A Baseball Film	Martin Duque	Short
2016	Birth of a Killer	Lucas Father	Short
2016	Duqüe	Martin Duque	Short
2016	Gino's Wife	Agent Montoya	
2016	Dead Awake	Dr. Hassan Davies	
2017	Closer To Bottom	Thomas	
2017	The Dagger	-	Short
2018	Colossal Youth	Mr. De La Vega	
2019	Phoenix, Oregon	Carlos	
2019	The Margarita Man	Jimmy Martinez	
2019	Teenage Girl: Valerie's Holiday	Joe	
2020	Limbo	CPS Investigator	
2020	Luminous	Lou	Short
2023	Addicted to You	Papa Felipe	Short

=== Television ===
Year	Title	Role	Notes
1984–87	Fame	Jesse Velasquez	Main Cast: Season 4–6
1987	The Bronx Zoo	Julio Gaspare	Episode: "Small Victories"
1988	Miami Vice	Enrique 'Rique' Lorca-Mendez	Episode: "A Bullet For Crocket"
1989	Miami Vice	Octavio Escandero	Episode: "Jack Of All Trades"
1989	Married... with Children	Bruno	Episode: "Can't Dance Don't Ask"
1990	Midnight Caller	Carlos Mendez	Episode: "Kid Salinas"
1991	Under Cover	Sam	Episode: "Sacrifices"
1991	China Beach	Hector	Episode: "100 Klicks Out"
1997	Chicago Hope	Michael Waters	Episode: "The Sun Also Rises"
1997	ER	HIV-Positive Patient	Episode: "Ambush"
1997	Happily Ever After: Fairy Tales for Every Child	Tanatiuh the Fierce (voice)	Episode: "The Elves and the Shoemaker"
1998	The Hunger	Jess	Episode: "Plain Brown Envelope"
1999	Brimstone	Paco Gomez	Episode: "Lovers"
1999	Magnificent Seven	Don Paulo Monterro	Episode: "Love & Honor"
2001	Touched By An Angel	Tommy Hernandez	Episode: "Mi Familia"
2002	Animated Tales of the World	Sanchez (voice)	Episode: "John Henry: The Steel Driving Man"
2002	What's New, Scooby-Doo?	Luis Cepeda (voice)	Episode: "3-D Struction"
2003–04	24	Gael Ortega	Recurring Cast: Season 3
2005	Medical Investigation	Antonio Baracas	Episode: "Mission La Roca: Part 1 & 2"
2006	CSI: Miami	Nicholas Suero	Episode: "Free Fall"
2007	CSI: Crime Scene Investigation	Felix Rodriguez	Episode: "Lying Down with Dogs"
2007–08	ER	Javier	Recurring Cast: Season 14
2008	Dexter	George King	Recurring Cast: Season 3
2008	Independent Lens	Fred Cruz (voice)	Episode: "Writ Writer"
2011	Chaos	Ernesto Salazar	Episode: "Proof of Life"
2013	Burn Notice	Nando	Episode: "Things Unseen"
2014	From Dusk till Dawn: The Series	T.T. Doorman	Recurring Cast: Season 1
2015	American Crime	Oscar	Recurring Cast: Season 1
2016	Good Behavior	David	Episode: "The Ballad of Little Santino"
2017	Fear the Walking Dead	Efraín Morales	Recurring Cast: Season 3
2020	Vida	Victor	Recurring Cast: Season 3
