= Phoenix, Oregon (film) =

2019 American film

- Directed by: Gary Lundgren
- Written by: Gary Lundgren
- Produced by: Christine Sheaks; Anne Lundgren
- Cinematography: Patrick Neary
- Distributed by: Joma Films
- Release dates: April 11, 2019 (Ashland Film Festival); March 20, 2020 (United States)
- Running time: 108 minutes
- Country: United States
- Language: English
- Box office: $41,969

Phoenix, Oregon is a 2019 American comedy-drama film directed by Gary Lundgren. The film led the United States box office for three non-consecutive weeks in 2020 during the first wave of the COVID-19 pandemic, when nearly all movie theaters in the country were closed.

== Plot ==
A failing comic book artist and a chef working in a dead-end restaurant quit their jobs to restore a bowling alley and pizza parlor.

== Production ==
The film was shot in Klamath Falls, Oregon.

== Release ==
The film debuted at the Ashland (Oregon) Film Festival in April 2019, and received a digital release in March 2020. Box Office Mojo reported it as the number-one box office film the weeks of March 20–26, April 3–9, and April 10–16, 2020, during the initial wave of the COVID-19 pandemic, when virtually all movie theaters in the country were in a mandatory shutdown. This was due to an online streaming access campaign led by the distributing studio; a limited release had been planned on March 20, 2020, and Joma Films instead made the film available to stream at the price of $6.50, which received enough reported revenue to top the box office. Portions of the proceeds from the film's streaming release were directed towards the support of local movie theaters that had been slated to screen the film. The film was made available on Blu-Ray and DVD on June 24, 2020.

== Reception ==
The film received mixed reviews from critics.

== Cast ==
- James Le Gros – Bobby
- Jesse Borrego – Carlos
- Lisa Edelstein – Tanya
- Dietrich Bader – Kyle
- Kevin Corrigan – Al
