= La Mission (film) =

2009 American film

- Film poster
- Directed by: Peter Bratt
- Written by: Peter Bratt
- Produced by: Benjamin Bratt; Peter Bratt; Alpita Patel
- Starring: Benjamin Bratt; Jeremy Ray Valdez; Max Rosenak; Erika Alexander; Jesse Borrego
- Cinematography: Hiro Narita
- Edited by: Stan Webb
- Music by: Mark Kilian
- Distributed by: Global Cinema Distribution
- Release dates: January 19, 2009 (Sundance); April 9, 2010 (United States)
- Running time: 117 minutes
- Country: United States
- Language: English

La Mission is a 2009 drama film starring Benjamin Bratt and Jeremy Ray Valdez. It is written and directed by Peter Bratt (Benjamin's brother). The film premiered at the 2009 Sundance Film Festival and screened at various festivals, including the San Francisco International Film Festival and the Palm Springs International Film Festival. It received a limited release beginning April 9, 2010.

== Premise ==
Che Rivera is a former convict living in the Mission District of San Francisco. A recovering alcoholic and bus driver by day, Che is respected throughout the Mission barrio for his masculinity and toughness. His hobby of building beautiful lowrider cars also makes him a beloved figure in the community. Che has raised his only son Jesse, a studious teenager, on his own since the death of his wife. Che faces challenges to his personal values when he discovers Jesse is gay.

== Cast ==
- Benjamin Bratt as Che Rivera
- Jeremy Ray Valdez as Jesse Rivera
- Erika Alexander as Lena
- Jesse Borrego as Rene Rivera
- Talisa Soto as Ana Rivera
- Alex Hernandez as Smoke
- Max Rosenak as Jordan
- Cesar Gomez as Gummy Bear
- Chris Borgzinner as Nacho
- Gustavo Gus Gonzalez as Primo
- Neo Veavea as Kenny
- Cathleen Riddley as Shell
- Marcus Serralta as Chuy
- Tatiana Rivas as Nadine

== Production ==
Writer-director Peter Bratt said among the challenging aspects of the film's production was raising financing, as he and brother Benjamin were told "more than a few times that 'the gay thing' had already been done and was now passe," referring to films and TV shows like Brokeback Mountain and Will & Grace. "In short order, what these people were saying was that the white experience is the universal one. When we tried to explain how much of a social taboo homosexuality remains in many communities of color, the reaction was often one of disbelief," said Bratt. The brothers could also not get support from the Latino and Native American communities, where homosexuality is also still considered taboo.

Bratt considered filming the movie in New Mexico, where tax rebates allow for productions to be filmed relatively inexpensively. He ultimately settled on San Francisco's Mission District, saying, "In my mind it's one of the most unique American neighborhoods in the country and it has a dynamic that I don't think you can duplicate anywhere else. And the character of the neighborhood kind of informs the story."

The film was shot in 26 days.

The production participated in the San Francisco "Scene in San Francisco Incentive Program" administered by the San Francisco Film Commission.

=== Environmental impact ===
Several scenes in the movie make subtle hints at environmentally friendly themes, such as converting lowriders to run on biodiesel. The film was also shot on an eco-friendly movie set, one of the first of its kind in San Francisco. The cast and crew eliminated the use of water bottles and used composting on set, while the art department allowed for green product placement in the film. La Mission subsequently earned an Environmental Media Association (EMA) Green Seal Award in 2009 as the result of their production practices.

== Release ==
=== Film festivals ===
The film premiered at the 2009 Sundance Film Festival. It went on to play the festival circuit and was the opening night film at Outfest LA, the New York International Latino Film Festival, San Francisco International Film Festival, and the Artivist Film Festival. It also screened at the Independent Film Festival Boston, Austin Film Festival, Philadelphia QFest, American Indian Film Festival, and the Los Angeles Latino International Film Festival.

=== Theatrical ===
The film opened on April 9, 2010, in New York City and Los Angeles and on April 16 in San Francisco. The DVD was released on August 10, 2010. A soundtrack, Songs of La Mission, was released by Round Whirled Records.

== Reception ==
On the review aggregator website Rotten Tomatoes, 50% of 26 critics' reviews are positive. Metacritic, which uses a weighted average, assigned the film a score of 47 out of 100, based on 17 critics, indicating "mixed or average" reviews.

Critic Roger Ebert gave the film 2½ stars out of 4, writing the "story is told earnestly and with some force" and the filmmakers' "hearts are in the right place, but the film tries to say too many things for its running time." Ebert noted "La Mission is forthright in avoiding easy answers", but he also felt the screenplay needed to give the characters more complexity. In contrast, James Greenberg of The Hollywood Reporter opined the Bratt brothers "capture the conflicts of the Latino community in which they were raised." Greenberg added the film is "an honest attempt to portray the destructiveness of violence in the Latino community."

In a positive review for The Austin Chronicle, Marjorie Baumgarten wrote the "film oozes with location detail and a knowing sense of Latino culture." Baumgarten praised Benjamin Bratt's acting and added, "Peter Bratt’s script occasionally wallows in its melodramatic aspects but is, on the whole, an empathetic portrait of a man who struggles to work past his gut reactions." Latino media credited the film as being both authentic and genuine to various aspects of Latino American cultures.

== Awards and nominations ==
In 2010, La Mission received three Imagen Awards in the categories of Best Feature Film, Best Actor for Benjamin Bratt, and Best Supporting Actor for Jeremy Ray Valdez.

At the 2011 GLAAD Media Awards, La Mission was nominated for Outstanding Film - Limited Release. It was also nominated for a Dorian Award for LGBTQ Film of the Year.

La Mission also received the award for International Human Rights - Best Feature at the Artivist Film Festival, and the Audience Award at the OUT Film Festival Connecticut. It received an Estela Award from the National Association of Latino Producers.

== See also ==
- List of hood films
