= Badsville =

- Directed by: April Mullen
- Written by: Benjamin Barrett; Ian McLaren
- Produced by: David Phillips; Douglas Spain
- Starring: Robert Knepper; Emilio Rivera
- Cinematography: Russ De Jong
- Edited by: Gordon Antell
- Music by: Simone Cilio
- Production company: Phillm Productions
- Distributed by: Epic Pictures Releasing
- Release date: October 20, 2017 (Tallgrass Film Festival)
- Running time: 97 minutes
- Countries: United States; Canada
- Language: English

Badsville is a 2017 action drama film directed by April Mullen and starring Robert Knepper and Emilio Rivera.

== Cast ==
- Robert Knepper as Mr. Gavin
- Tamara Duarte as Suzy
- Emilio Rivera as Lucky Lou
- Chelsea Rendon as Helen
- John White as Martin
- Rene Rosado as Georgie
- Douglas Spain as Charlie
- Corbin Timbrook as Chester
- Paul James Jordan as Cutter
- Shelby Janes as Bowling Alley Waitress
- Octavio Pisano as Flaco
- Saxon Trainor as Louise
- Gregory Kasyan as Sammy
- Kelly Cunningham as Theresa
- Benjamin Barrett as Benny
- David Phillips as Chuck
- Kate Campbell as Sammy's Mom
- Ian McLaren as Wink
- Lucas James as Chad

== Production ==
According to the Niagara Falls Review, Mullen expressed interest in directing the film after David Phillips showed her the script. The film was shot in Southern California.

On November 3, 2016, it was announced that Epic Pictures acquired the distribution rights to Badsville.

== Reception ==
Gary MacDonald of The Globe and Mail wrote "Badsville's an ugly place, but the acting/directing chops in this indie film brighten it considerably".

Gary Goldstein of the Los Angeles Times said, "Forget the cheapo title, Badsville is a powerful, deeply felt crime drama about letting go of the past and getting out of Dodge - before it's too late".
