= Listen Up (TV series) =

- Genre: Sitcom
- Developed by: Jeff Martin
- Starring: Jason Alexander; Wendy Makkena; Daniella Monet; Will Rothhaar; Malcolm-Jamal Warner
- Music by: Brian Kirk
- Country of origin: United States
- Original language: English
- No. of seasons: 1
- No. of episodes: 22

Production
- Executive producer: Jeff Martin
- Producer: Jason Alexander
- Camera setup: Multi-camera
- Production companies: Regency Television; CBS Productions; Fox Television Studios

Original release
- Network: CBS
- Release: September 20, 2004 – April 25, 2005

Listen Up is an American sitcom television series created by Jeff Martin, that aired on CBS from September 20, 2004, until April 25, 2005. The series was produced by Regency Television, CBS Productions and Fox Television Studios. The sitcom was based loosely on the life and exploits of the popular sportswriter and sports-media personality Tony Kornheiser. Its principal executive producer was Jason Alexander, who was also the lead actor. Despite decent-to-good ratings, the show was canceled by CBS on May 18, 2005; "rising production costs" was the major reason officially given for the cancellation.

== Premise ==
Tony Kleinman is a Philadelphia based sports show host whose sidekick is Bernie Widmer, a former NFL player; together they host the TV show Listen Up. While Tony does talk about sports on the show and in his newspaper column, he strays away occasionally to talk about the daily exploits of his family: his wife, Dana, a fund-raiser coordinator; his son, Mickey, a 15-year-old golf prodigy, and Megan, his 14-year-old, know-it-all, smart-mouthed, soccer-playing daughter.

== Cast and characters ==
- Jason Alexander as Tony Kleinman, a co-host of Listen Up, a sports talk show
- Wendy Makkena as Dana Kleinman, an administrator at Philadelphia Zoo
- Daniella Monet as Megan Kleinman, the teenage daughter of Tony
- Will Rothhaar as Mickey Kleinman, the teenage son of Tony
- Malcolm-Jamal Warner as Bernie Widmer, a retired NFL player and a co-host of Listen Up

== Episodes ==
No.	Title	Directed by	Written by	Original release date	Prod. code	Viewers (millions)
1	"Pilot"	Andy Ackerman	Jeff Martin	September 20, 2004	10068-04-179	11.75
2	"Hammer Time"	Andy Ackerman	Linda Videtti Figueiredo	September 27, 2004	12-04-101	11.20
3	"Grandmaster of the Wolfhunt"	Mark Cendrowski	Kenya Barris	October 4, 2004	12-04-102	10.75
4	"Cool Jerk"	Andrew D. Weyman	David Litt	October 11, 2004	12-04-104	9.79
5	"Quest for Fire"	John Whitesell	Dan O'Keefe	October 18, 2004	12-04-103	9.50
6	"Mickey Swallows a Bee"	Barnet Kellman	Dan Kopelman	October 25, 2004	12-04-107	10.26
7	"The Gift of the Ton-i"	Terry Hughes	Dan Kopelman	November 8, 2004	12-04-106	10.34
8	"Sweet Charity"	Andy Cadiff	David Litt	November 15, 2004	12-04-108	10.83
9	"Thanksgiving"	Bob Koherr	Daphne Pollon	November 22, 2004	12-04-110	10.92
10	"Mickey Without a Cause"	Andy Ackerman	Dan O'Keefe	November 29, 2004	12-04-109	10.15
11	"Enemy at the Gates"	Terry Hughes	Daphne Pollon	December 13, 2004	12-04-105	10.34
12	"Tony the Tiger"	Rob Schiller	Dan Kopelman	January 3, 2005	12-04-112	11.18
13	"Snub Thy Neighbor"	Bob Koherr	Linda Videtti Figueiredo	January 17, 2005	12-04-113	10.07
14	"Weekend with Bernie"	Bob Koherr	Erika Kaestle & Patrick McCarthy & Jamie Rhonheimer	January 31, 2005	12-04-114	9.74
15	"Inky Dinky Don't"	Bob Koherr	Dan Kopelman	February 7, 2005	12-04-115	9.23
16	"Colon-Oopscopy"	Lynn McCracken	Jamie Rhonheimer	February 14, 2005	12-04-116	9.32
17	"Tony Whine-Man"	Gerry Cohen	Erika Kaestle & Patrick McCarthy	February 21, 2005	12-04-117	9.12
18	"Couch Potato"	Leonard R. Garner Jr.	Dan O'Keefe	March 7, 2005	12-04-118	9.26
19	"Waiting for Kleinman"	Rob Schiller	Kenya Barris	March 21, 2005	12-04-111	9.93
20	"Check Mates"	Bob Koherr	Linda Videtti Figueiredo	April 11, 2005	12-04-119	8.65
21	"Ebony and Irony"	Bob Koherr	Dan Kopelman & Jamie Rhonheimer	April 18, 2005	12-04-120	9.02
22	"Last Vegas"	Bob Koherr	Erika Kaestle & Patrick McCarthy	April 25, 2005	12-04-121	8.77

== Reception ==
=== Critical response ===
Critical reaction was largely negative. USA Today's Robert Bianco wrote that the show makes the "mistake of trying to build a star vehicle around a second banana". A New York Times review called it "a rickety vehicle for Jason Alexander". Critics disagreed on the supporting cast – while USA Today noted, "When 'Listen Up' focuses on its supporting cast, the show works", The New York Times referred to a "stiff supporting cast". Matt Rouse of TV Guide wrote, "Forget about the 'Seinfeld' curse, this is just mediocre material and bad casting."

=== Ratings ===
The premiere episode drew 11.8 million viewers, while the final episode drew 8.9 million viewers.
