= Follow Me Home (film) =

- Directed by: Peter Bratt
- Written by: Peter Bratt
- Starring: Alfre Woodard; Jesse Borrego; Benjamin Bratt; Calvin Levels; Steve Reevis
- Release date: 1996
- Country: United States
- Language: English

Follow Me Home is a 1996 American drama film directed by activist and filmmaker Peter Bratt. It explores spiritual and intercultural race relations.

== Plot ==
Four artists, one African American, one Native American, and two Latin-American cousins, embark on a cross-country road trip to paint a mural on the White House. Along the way, they meet a mysterious African American woman bearing a deep secret.

== Cast ==
- Alfre Woodard as Evey
- Jesse Borrego as Tudee
- Salma Hayek as Veronica
- Calvin Levels as Kaz
- Benjamin Bratt as Abel
- Steve Reevis as Freddy
- Tom Bower as Larry
- John Allen Nelson as Perry

== Release ==
The film was re-released in October 2020. Follow Me Home has yet to be picked up by a major distribution company. The film is currently being shown on request, usually at universities and community centers, followed by a discussion facilitated by Native American activist Lakota Harden.

== Awards ==
Peter Bratt received the Audience Award for Best Feature at the 1996 San Francisco International Film Festival, and the film earned the Best Feature Film Audience Award. It was also an Official Selection in the 1996 Sundance Film Festival.
