= American Refugee =

2021 horror film

- Film poster
- Directed by: Ali LeRoi
- Written by: Allison Buckmelter; Nicolas Buckmelter
- Produced by: Paige Pemberton; Paul Uddo
- Starring: Erika Alexander; Derek Luke; Sam Trammell
- Cinematography: Federico Verardi
- Edited by: Tim Mirkovich
- Music by: Dara Taylor
- Production companies: Blumhouse Television; Epix
- Distributed by: Paramount Home Entertainment
- Release date: December 10, 2021
- Running time: 94 minutes
- Country: United States
- Language: English

American Refugee is a 2021 American horror thriller film directed by Ali LeRoi and written by Allison Buckmelter and Nicolas Buckmelter. It stars Erika Alexander, Derek Luke and Sam Trammell. Jason Blum served as an executive producer through his Blumhouse Television banner.

The film was released digitally on December 10, 2021, by Paramount Home Entertainment and Epix.

== Plot ==
The Taylors - an African American family comprising Helen (an MD), Greg (an academic), teenage daughter Zoe, recently born Mia and pre-teenage adopted son Kai - have just moved to a spacious home in a rural area, miles from any city.

Their situation is soon up-ended. The economy collapses, there are food shortages, schools close, and there is looting and general chaos. The country comes under martial law.

While shopping at the empty-shelved local market, Helen helps a scared young pregnant woman to pick some medical supplies. Later, an armed boy shows up asking for Helen. The boy, Matty, his father Winter and the market woman Amber live next door. They need Helen's help because Amber is bleeding.

Matty takes Helen and Greg to an underground fortified bunker. There, a resistant Winter lets Helen examine Amber.

After their home is looted, the Taylors seek shelter with Winter in his bunker. He reluctantly lets them stay as Amber may need Helen when she gives birth.

In this confined environment, arguing between Winter and the Taylors soon starts. Kai is found disturbing the fans of food, out of curiosity; Winter points out it won't last with more mouths to feed - it needs to stay in expiration date order. To make Greg useful, he shows him how to make bullets and gets Greg to fire a gun.

in the night, men attack the bunker and Winter and Greg defend the camp. At the same time, Amber's baby is being born; later, Amber struggles to breastfeed, so that is asked of Helen.

Winter finds a gun that Greg had concealed from everyone after he killed one of the intruders. Greg is confronted by Winter, leading to a fight. Winter banishes Greg and Kai from the bunker for not contributing.

Greg and Kai go to their old house where Greg gathers together various materials. Next day they return and attempt to get their family released from the bunker by smoking the bunker ventilation. Winter leaves the bunker locking the rest inside, telling them to stay in the bedrooms. They don't. Matty looks for the spare key but Kai took it earlier from a false tin of food. However, he placed it in the book of Daniel in the Bible and it falls out.

Everyone escapes and Helen takes Amber and baby Daniel hostage with a shotgun to force Winter to drop his gun, with which he was threatening Greg. Kai, who has previously never spoken, shouts 'Dad!'; Greg then throws a pan of molten bullets at Winter, splashing him in one eye.

Later, another family arrive at the gates as Kai narrates. He mentions the pecking order he mentioned at the start of the story. A new pecking order can be established after conflict, and the new leader might be a surprise. We see Helen approach the gate with the two men behind her.

== Cast ==
- Erika Alexander as Helen Taylor
- Derek Luke as Greg Taylor
- Sam Trammell as Winter
- Zamani Wilder as Zoe Taylor
- Jessi Case as Amber
- Vince Mattis as Matty
- Charity Jordan as Brooke
- Peyton Jackson as Kai Taylor

== Production ==
In April 2021, it was announced that Ali LeRoi would direct the television horror film American Refugee, written by Allison and Nicolas Buckmelter. The film is part of a partnership between cable network Epix and Blumhouse Television, which will produce eight films for the network. Blumhouse founder Jason Blum serves as an executive producer. In May 2021, Erika Alexander, Derek Luke, Sam Trammell, Peyton Jackson, Zamani Wilder, Jessi Case and Vince Mattis joined the cast of the film.

Principal photography began in April 2021, in New Orleans.

== Release ==
The film was released on December 10, 2021, by Epix.
