= Kart Racer =

2003 family sports drama film directed by Stuart Gillard

- Canadian theatrical release poster
- Directed by: Stuart Gillard
- Written by: Nicholas DiBella
- Produced by: Leif Bristow
- Starring: Randy Quaid; Will Rothhaar; Jennifer Wigmore; David Gallagher
- Music by: Jeff Danna
- Production companies: Knightscove Entertainment; Apollo Media
- Distributed by: Alliance Atlantis Releasing
- Release date: 16 May 2003
- Running time: 93 minutes
- Countries: Canada; Germany
- Language: English

Kart Racer is a 2003 sports drama film directed by Stuart Gillard, and starring Will Rothhaar, David Gallagher and Randy Quaid. In the United States, it premiered on television on ABC Family in 2005.

The film centers on a boy named Watts "Lightbulb" Davies (Will Rothhaar) who likes to race go-karts. Unable to come up with enough funds to purchase his own kart, Watts convinces his father, Vic Davies (Randy Quaid) (a former kart racer himself), to help him build a cart and teach him how to drive. As he follows his dream, he then has to race against karting champion Scott McKenna and local bully Rodney Wells.

Footage of the racing simulator NASCAR Racing 2002 Season by Papyrus Design Group can be seen as they are playing it at the arcade.

== Plot ==
Watts Davies (Will Rothhaar) is a 14-year-old kid who decides to take up go-kart racing, he finds a new pursuit and begins to reconnect with his father, Vic (Randy Quaid), whom he has been clashing with since the death of his mother. Watts has an intense rivalry with Rodney Wells (Joe Dinicol), his enemy and local bully. Rodney stops at nothing to make Watts look bad; and he and his crew are not above getting Watts arrested. A little later, after more trouble, Watts sadly watches as Rodney and his dad buys the kart that he had originally set his eyes upon.

In an effort to bond with Watts, Vic (who is a former racer himself) helps him build a kart together and begins to train him in the fine art of kart racing, in which Watts proves to be a natural. With Vic's help and training, and a newly built kart, Watts enters the race. Throughout the film as Vic teaches Watts how to compete, the young driver begins to fall for Dahlia (Amanda De Martinis), an attractive and rebellious local girl and a graffiti artist. The final race ends up being between Watts, Rodney and defending champion Scott McKenna. Rodney tries to take out Watts but ends up crashing with 2 laps to go. The final lap is between Watts and Scott, and in a photo finish, Watts edges Scott to take the checkered flag.

== Cast ==
- Randy Quaid as Victor "Vic" Davies
- Will Rothhaar as Watts Davies
- Jennifer Wigmore as Deputy Jenna West
- David Gallagher as Scott McKenna
- Amanda de Martinis as Dahlia Stone
- Joe Dinicol as Rodney Wells
- Jordan Conti as Bink
- Johnny Griffin as Toomey
- Steve Adams as Clint Meyers
- Philip Spensley as Father Patrick Ramsey
- Leif Bristow as Rodney's Dad
- Harland Williams as Zee

== Accolades ==
The film won a Crystal Heart Award at the Heartland Film Festival and was nominated for a DGC Craft Award by the Directors Guild of Canada.
