= The Reading Room (film) =

- Written by: Randy Feldman
- Directed by: Georg Stanford Brown
- Starring: James Earl Jones; Joanna Cassidy; Douglas Spain; Monique Coleman; Tim Reid
- Country of origin: United States
- Original language: English

Production
- Running time: 93 minutes

Original release
- Network: Hallmark Channel
- Release: 2005

The Reading Room is a 2005 American made-for-television drama film that originally premiered on Hallmark Channel. It was directed by Georg Stanford Brown.

== Plot ==
William Campbell is a wealthy businessman who has just lost his wife. He decides to make good on a promise he made her by opening a free reading room in an inner-city neighborhood where he grew up. Despite his good intentions, problems in the neighborhood threaten his establishment, especially from local gang members and a preacher who questions Campbell's motives.

== Cast ==
- James Earl Jones as William Campbell
- Georg Stanford Brown as Rahim
- Joanna Cassidy as Diana Weston
- Keith Robinson as Darrel
- Douglas Spain as Javier
- Monique Coleman as Leesha
- Jessica Szohr as Dayva
- Gabby Soleil as Majoli
- Austin Marques as Edgar
- Tim Reid as Douglas

== Awards ==
- Camie (2006) Won
- Image Award (2006) Nominated for Outstanding TV Movie, Mini-Series or Dramatic Special
- Vision Award (2006) Nominated for Best Drama
- WGA Award (TV) (2006) Nominated
