= Camp X-Ray (film) =

2014 film by Peter Sattler

- Theatrical film poster
- Directed by: Peter Sattler
- Written by: Peter Sattler
- Produced by: Gina Kwon
- Starring: Kristen Stewart; Payman Maadi; Lane Garrison; Joseph Julian Soria; John Carroll Lynch
- Cinematography: James Laxton
- Edited by: Geraud Brisson
- Music by: Jess Stroup
- Production companies: GNK Productions; Gotham Group; Rough House Pictures; The Young Gang
- Distributed by: IFC Films
- Release dates: January 17, 2014 (Sundance); October 17, 2014 (United States)
- Running time: 117 minutes
- Country: United States
- Languages: English; Arabic
- Budget: $1 million
- Box office: $101,053

Camp X-Ray is a 2014 American drama film written and directed by Peter Sattler in his directorial debut, based on the detention facility Camp X-Ray at the Guantanamo Bay detention camp. It stars Kristen Stewart and Payman Maadi along with John Carroll Lynch, Lane Garrison, and Joseph Julian Soria in supporting roles. The film premiered at the 2014 Sundance Film Festival on January 17, and was released theatrically in the United States on October 17, 2014, by IFC Films.

== Plot ==
The film begins with the September 11 attacks shown on television when Ali Amir enters a house and begins to perform salah (Islamic prayer) when he is kidnapped and taken to Guantanamo Bay detention camp, specifically Camp Delta.

Eight years later, Army Private first-class Amy Cole is placed as a guard at Guantanamo. Upon arrival, she volunteers for the initial reaction force, commonly called the IRF. She is initially cold towards the detainees, despite her contempt for the facility's handling of detainees. While on duty, Ali tries to make conversation, but Cole is annoyed by his persistence and rebuffs his advances; in return, Ali throws his feces at her and is sent to the frequent flyer program (sleep deprivation punishment). Corporal "Randy" Ransdell also takes an interest in Cole, going as far as to attempt to rape her in a bathroom.

Cole enters Ali's cell while it is being searched and notices suicide-prevention pamphlets on the floor. She finds Ali's file, which reveals that he has a history of self-harm and discipline, becoming more and more violent as time passes. When Ali returns to his cell, he apologizes to Amy for his actions. He confides to her that he was born in Bremen, Germany and was not involved with terrorist groups and a relationship forms between the two.

Eight months later, Ransdell lies to Cole and orders her to watch Ali shower, violating Standard Operating Procedure (SOP) and Arabic social norms. Upon discovering that Ransdell lied, Cole files a report with her commanding officer, Colonel James Drummond. Drummond talks to Ransdell, who makes (unspecified) counter-accusations, and dismisses Cole's complaint because Ransdell is her superior. Ransdell and Cole must both attend a board of inquiry, which is not shown. Cole becomes more isolated from the other guards and is reassigned to the night shift.

One night, near the end of Cole's tour at Guantanamo, Ali takes a blade hidden in his Quran and is about to commit suicide, but is talked down by Cole, who tells him her name and where she's from in violation of SOP. At this point, it is clear that her feelings towards the detainee have softened as she is distressed by the possibility of him dying. As Cole leaves Guantanamo teary-eyed, Ali discovers the Harry Potter book he had been hoping for over two years, finding she had written a note inside saying: "To Ali, I don't know if Snape's a good guy. But I know you are. Love, Blondie".

== Cast ==
- Kristen Stewart as PFC Amy Cole / Referred to as "Blondie" by Ali throughout the film. The character's first name is unknown until Ali and Cole's stand-off
- Payman Maadi as Ali Amir
- Julia Duffy as Betty Cole
- John Carroll Lynch as COL James Drummond
- Lane Garrison as CPL "Randy" Ransdell / Referred to as "Mop-Top" by Ali
- Joseph Julian Soria as PFC Rico Cruz
- Tara Holt as PFC Mary Winters
- Ser'Darius Blain as PFC Raymond Jackson
- Cory Michael Smith as PFC Bergen
- Mark Naji as Detainee #1
- Anoop Simon as Detainee #2
- Robert Tarpinian as Detainee #3
- Yousuf Azami as Ehan
- Marco Khan as Mahmoud
- Kyle Bornheimer as Night Shift C.O.
- Nawal Bengholam as Newscaster
- LaDell Preston as IRF #1
- Daniel Leavitt as IRF #2

== Production ==
On February 6, 2014, IFC Films announced their acquisition of the North American rights to the film. Shooting Stars LLC acquired the rights to distribute the film in the United Arab Emirates. EDGE Entertainment will distribute Camp X-Ray in Denmark, Finland, Norway, and Sweden. The film was distributed in Lebanon and Iraq with an October 30, 2014, release date.

=== Filming ===
Production for Camp X-Ray took place in Los Angeles and Whittier, California. Principal photography began on July 17, 2013, and ended in mid-August. The location used for filming the prison scenes was the abandoned Fred C. Nelles Youth Correctional Facility in Whittier, California.

== Promotion and marketing ==
The film moved to post-production in late summer 2013. The special effects were edited by Comen VFX. On December 5, 2013, it was announced that the film would premiere on January 17 at the Sundance Film Festival in the US Dramatic Competition category. On July 3, 2014, ten new stills from the film were released. IFC Films released the official trailer on August 8, 2014, on its YouTube channel.

Camp X-Ray is rated R by the MPAA for language and brief nude images. The film became available in select theaters and through video on demand services including iTunes Movies and Amazon.com Video starting October 17, 2014. The film was also a selection for the Atlantic Film Festival, Deauville American Film Festival, BFI London Film Festival, Abu Dhabi Film Festival, Leiden International Film Festival, Hof International Film Festival, and the Stockholm International Film Festival.

Camp X-Ray premiered with a special screening on October 6, 2014, in New York City.

== Soundtrack ==
The soundtrack for Camp X-Ray includes "Kettering" by The Antlers from Hospice and "Concrete City" by Shyan Selah. The song "You There" by Aquilo is featured in the trailer released by IFC Films.

Jess Stroup's original score for the film soundtrack was released through iTunes by Lakeshore Records on October 14, 2014.

== Reception ==
=== Box office ===
The film opened on October 17, showing in one theater in New York City. The film grossed $1,316. The film expanded to three screens in its second week and posted an increase of 134% of $3,480. As of November 9, the film has grossed $9,837. The film also debuted on video on demand and rose to #12 in overall releases on iTunes. Camp X-Ray grossed $50,744 in the United Arab Emirates.

=== Critical response ===
Camp X-Ray premiered at Sundance Film Festival with generally positive reviews, with specific praise for Stewart and Moaadi's performances. The review aggregator website Rotten Tomatoes gives it a rating of 74%, with 57 film critics giving the film a positive review and it has an average rating of 6.4 out of 10. The critics' consensus states: "Camp X-Ray's treatment of its subject verges on the shallow, but benefits greatly from a pair of impressive performances from Kristen Stewart and Peyman Moaadi." On Metacritic, the film has a score of 54 out of 100, based on 25 critics.

David Rooney of The Hollywood Reporter gave a positive review, calling it "A somber but cogent drama that uses its setting as a provocative backdrop rather than a debate point" and praising the lead actors by saying that "Stewart, delivering perhaps her best screen work to date as an inexperienced military guard, against an equally compelling characterization from Maadi as the long-term detainee who pierces her shell." Marlow Stern of The Daily Beast wrote, "by the end of Camp X-Ray, you're won over by Stewart's layered turn as Cole, and Maadi's as the defiant Ali. It's a role perfectly suited to her strengths—vulnerability and hidden courage—and few young actresses, with the exception of Jennifer Lawrence, can hold a close-up like Stewart." Rob Nelson in his review of the film for Variety said that "Camp X-Ray is most commendable for believably depicting the U.S. military from a female's point of view" and that "The two leads (Stewart and Maadi) are excellent and play off each other deftly." Scott Mendelson of Forbes wrote, "Kristen Stewart is engaging and Peyman Moaadi avoids the "noble savage" cliché with ease. The performances are stronger than the film which contains them, but since the picture is mostly a two-hander that's not entirely a fatal flaw." Matt Zoller Seitz of RogerEbert.com gave the film three out of five, and praised Sattler's direction, as well as Stewart and Maadi. Seitz wrote of Stewart: "There are silent film-quality close-ups where you can read every fluctuation in her mood even though she's barely moving a muscle. This is a true movie star performance." Seitz remarked, "The relationship between Amy, a strong-silent type, and Ali, a chatterbox provocateur, has a '70s-movie feel."

Xan Brooks of The Guardian gave the film two out of five, echoing praise for the acting, saying "Moaadi (so good as the shifty dad in the A Separation) is suitably anguished as Ali, while Stewart copes well as his pensive prison guard, constantly trying to act more tough than she is. It's a role that reminds us what a fine performer she was in the likes of Into the Wild and Adventureland", but criticized the film in general, saying "the supporting players are little more than equal opportunity stereotypes (frothing Islamists; brutish grunts), while the dialogue is a clatter of cookie-cutter exposition, intent on telling us everything but explaining very little". Eric Kohn of Indiewire criticized the screenplay and direction by saying that "Sattler's frustratingly on-the-nose screenplay" and "It's a powerful assertion about the prospects of being trapped by misguided intentions, which sadly applies to Camp X-Ray itself" but ultimately praised Stewart's performance. Owen Gleiberman of Entertainment Weekly gave the film a negative review by saying that "it's also a flatly made movie" and said that Stewart was miscast in the role as "she has no toughness, no moxie, no callouses on her hide".

=== Awards and nominations ===
Writer/Director Peter Sattler earned a nomination for a Humanitas Prize in the Sundance category. Casting director Richard Hicks earned an Artios Awards nomination for Outstanding Achievement in Casting — Low Budget Feature — Drama. The Women Film Critics Circle also nominated Kristen Stewart for Best Actress and the film for "Best Movie about Women." Stewart was also nominated for the Razzie Redeemer Award.
