= Delivering Milo =

2001 film by Nick Castle

- Directed by: Nick Castle
- Written by: David Hubbard (screenplay); Heidi Levitt (story); Diana Wagman
- Produced by: Heidi Levitt; Deepak Nayar; Heriberto Schoeffer
- Starring: Anton Yelchin; Albert Finney; Bridget Fonda; Campbell Scott; Douglas Spain
- Cinematography: Willy Kurant
- Edited by: Patrick Kennedy; Peck Prior
- Music by: Craig Safan
- Production company: Lakeshore International
- Distributed by: Hannover House
- Release date: October 28, 2001
- Running time: 94 minutes
- Country: United States
- Language: English

Delivering Milo is a 2001 American fantasy comedy film written by David Hubbard and directed by Nick Castle. Anton Yelchin stars as Milo, while Bridget Fonda and Campbell Scott play his parents. Albert Finney stars as Elmore Dahl, a guardian angel sent to convince a soul that life on Earth is worth living.

== Plot ==
Elizabeth and Kevin live in NYC in the loft above his glassblowing studio and are expecting their first child. Believing she has gone into labor, they hurry to the hospital. But, once there, the obstetrician tells her she was having Braxton Hicks contractions.

The reality is that in the world from which babies come, Milo is too scared to leave the comfortable place where he has lived. He looks about 11 years old in this place despite not being born yet. Since babies must be born in order, no other babies will be born until he changes his mind. The people in charge have no idea what to do as no baby has ever refused. An old man named Elmore volunteers to show Milo that life is worth it. Elmore is trapped in a sort of limbo until he is determined worthy of Heaven, though he would much rather be back on Earth as he finds limbo to be very boring.

Seeing a chance, Elmore bargains with the powers that be. He must get Milo to say he wants to be born in exchange for more time on Earth. To convince Milo to accompany him, he takes advantage of the boy's love of cards games and tricks. They let the cards decide, and Elmore is triumphant.

Elizabeth calls her mom, updating her. She mentions she saw a man who looked like her father who'd abandoned them years ago.

Elmore and Milo exit through a door which normally serves only as an entrance. Outside is the energetic and terrifying New York City. Elmore loves it, but Milo doesn't want to be in this scary place.

Milo is introduced to a deli, ice cream and Central Park. He initially loves food which he has never needed before. However, once his natural bodily functions kick in and he needs the toilet, he is less convinced. A call from above suggests that Elmore try to inspire Milo's soul, but a museum visit has the opposite effect.

As the day goes on, the big news story seen in the background is the lack of births globally. This is a reminder of how Milo's doubt and refusal to be born has affected the world.

Cleaning up the studio after a pipe burst, Elizabeth finds a bag with Atlantic City paraphernalia that belonged to her father. She plays blackjack with her husband's workmate, and doing well, she impulsively goes to Atlantic City. Almost simultaneously Elmore takes Milo there too, as he loved to gamble when he was alive.

Milo's mind has not been changed and there is a deadline: at midnight, the door that the souls go through to be born will close, and no more babies will ever be born. In Atlantic City, Milo and Elizabeth meet. Milo realizes that Elizabeth is his mother, and decides he wants to be born. He also realizes that Elmore is the father who had abandoned Elizabeth and therefore his grandfather. Elmore and Milo return to the door. Milo, however, is too weak to make it through the door on his own, as his time is nearly up. He begins to die since he will never be born. Elmore, feeling remorse for how he treated his family in life takes Milo back through the door, giving up his chance to stay on Earth. Elmore accuses the people in charge of setting him up, as they knew Elmore would not be able to leave Milo to die. They don’t deny it, however, they remind him that he was given a choice. Milo is finally born and Elmore can finally ascend from limbo to heaven.

== Cast ==
- Anton Yelchin as Milo
- Albert Finney as Elmore Dahl
- Bridget Fonda as Elizabeth
- Campbell Scott as Kevin
- John Cho as Mr. Hugo
- Kenny Blank as Mr. Ralph

== See also ==
- List of films about angels
