= Moments of Clarity =

- Directed by: Stev Elam
- Written by: Christian Lloyd; Kristin Wallace
- Story by: Kristin Wallace; Cody Brown
- Produced by: David J. Phillips; Kristin Wallace
- Starring: Lyndsy Fonseca
- Cinematography: Chris Robertson
- Edited by: Gordon Antell
- Music by: Zain Effendi
- Production companies: Long Stem Pictures; Phillm Productions
- Distributed by: Level 33 Entertainment
- Release date: September 16, 2016
- Running time: 97 minutes
- Country: United States
- Language: English

Moments of Clarity is a 2016 American adventure comedy-drama film directed by Stev Elam and starring Lyndsy Fonseca and Kristin Wallace, who also co-wrote and co-produced the film.

The film marks one of the final performances of actress Angela McEwan.

== Plot ==
Claire (Kristin Wallace) is a kind-hearted twenty-something who shares a deeply sheltered life with her loving but agoraphobic mother, Henrietta (Saxon Trainor), and discovers that a much bigger world awaits her during a road trip to a youth retreat. Along the way, Claire is befriended by Danielle (Lyndsy Fonseca), an angry but well-intentioned girl who lives nearby with her father, Pastor Paul (Mackenzie Astin).

Determined to attend the retreat sponsored by Danielle's father, and with no notice to their parents or planning, they set out on a road trip in Claire's mother's barely functioning car. With new found freedom, Claire travels with Danielle to a long-awaited visit with her grandparents, who have not seen Claire in 12 years, largely due to misinformation from her fearful mother. They meet Trevor (A.J. Trauth), a wandering ukulele player who unwittingly creates a brief riff between the two girls. Later, having made up and giddy with wine, they stumble upon a rave hosted by Artemis (Xander Berkeley) whose partner Hal (Eric Roberts), it is later revealed, is Claire's biological father.

With the help of a bored but helpful policewoman (Bitty Schram), the anxious parents locate the girls and head off to get them. Chaos ensues as Claire's mother and Danielle's father descend on Hal's to find both girls recovering from a long night of partying. In short order, Claire also learns that Hal was an esteemed actor in pornographic films, while Danielle's father, desperate to connect with his only daughter, learns the truth behind the bottles of wine she was constantly leaving around the house.

After an awkward breakfast at Hal's, the group resolves to travel to the retreat and listens to Claire speak to the youth group where she nervously but with more confidence distills her last few days on the road into lessons and wisdom learned.

== Cast ==
- Lyndsy Fonseca as Danielle
- Kristin Wallace as Claire
- Mackenzie Astin as Pastor Paul
- Xander Berkeley as Artemis
- Eric Roberts as Hal Spreadum
- Saxon Trainor as Henrietta
- Bitty Schram as Officer Lori
- Marguerite Moreau as Maryanna
- A.J. Trauth as Trevor
- Jon Lajoie as Carter
- David J. Phillips as Franky
- Angela McEwan as Mrs. Erickson
