= Dylan Ramsey =

American actor

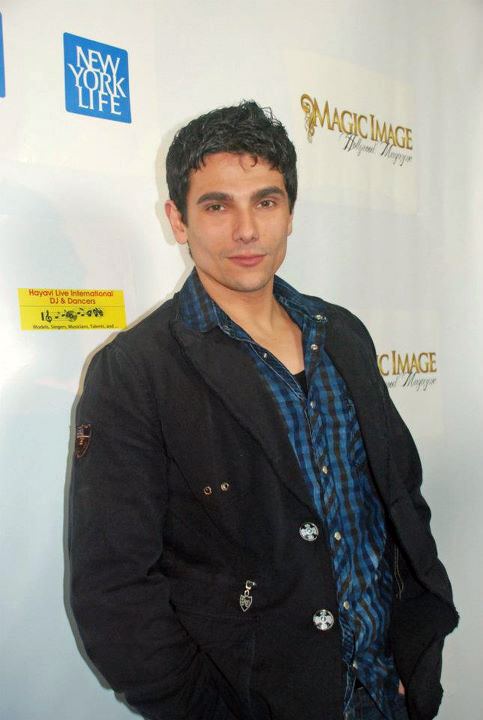
- Born: Prague, Czech Republic
- Occupations: Actor, film producer
- Years active: 2003 — present
- Website: http://www.dylanramsey.com

Dylan Ramsey is an American / Canadian actor and film producer, known for his portrayals of dark dramatic and comedically eccentric characters of diverse ethnicity. Recent major roles include the leading role of Ginger (a male cross-dressing prostitute) in HBO’s Donny & Ginger, guest-starring as the ethereal suicide bomber Saaed Hotary on FX’s Nip/Tuck and the title role of Jack Belmont in Visual Purple.

He also starred in Air Crash Investigation's "Killing Machine" as Bobby "The Killer", and Air Crash Investigation's "Death of the President" episode on the Polish Air Force Crash in 2014.

Ramsey is currently writing and producing two new media series.

== Biography ==
Ramsey was born in Prague, Czech Republic and raised in Toronto, Ontario, Canada. His father is Egyptian and his mother is a Polish Jew. He currently lives in Los Angeles County, California.

== Filmography ==
=== Films ===
Year	Title	Role	Notes
2030	The Secret of the Gods	Loren Ozenburg	Pre-Production
2023	My Foot is in Heaven	Jihad	
2021	The Exile Road	Shearshuk	
2021	The Elsewhere	Brad	
2017	Extinction	Adam	Amazon Prime
2017	The Delivery	Makszi Krol	
2016	The Suicide Flowers	Gabriel	
2016	BETA	Randall Ankrom	
2013	The Wanderers	Max	
2012	Assassins	Jack	
2011	The Wayshower	Prince Raja	
2011	Swamp Shark	Scott	TV movie, SYFY
2009	Mr. Sadman	Ashraf	
2009	Shark City	Teddy Gold	
2007	Visual Purple	Jack Belmont	
2007	Donny & Ginger	Ginger	TV movie, HBO
2007	All Lies on Me	Petrov	
2006	Dilenger's Diablos	Ted Marks	

=== Television ===
Year	Title	Role	Notes
2030	CyberOne	Richard "Cypher" Gad	Leading Role
2022-2026	Graveyard	Yasar	4 episodes
2022	Deadliest Catch	Health & Safety Supervisor	23 episodes
2017-2019	4 Blocks	Maruf Hamady (voice)	12 episodes
2017	S.W.A.T. (2017 TV series)	Paul	1 episode
2017	I Came for Peace	Todd	1 Episode
2020	Valley of Tears (TV series)	Malachi (voice)	Leading Role
2017	S41NT	P1r4ta	Leading Role
2017	24: Legacy	Rashid	2 episodes
2016	Like Family	Tony	Recurring Role
2016	CSI: Cyber	Mann	Episode: "Shades of Grey"
2016	Bloodlines	Diego	Leading Role
2014	NCIS: Los Angeles	Sgt. Sajadi	Episode: "Spoils of War"
2008-2015	Those Damn Canadians	Brad Depp	Leading Role
2004-2013	Air Emergency	Bobby 'The Killer'	2 episodes
2012	Transporter: The Series	Keck	Episode: "Harvest"
2012	Ringer	FBI Agent Hewson	Episode: "It's Called Improvising, Bitch!"
2011	Wingmen	Ernesto 'Chef' Vargas	TV Pilot: Leading Role
2009	Neighborhood Watch at the Hollywood	AJ	TV Pilot: Recurring Role
2008	Nip/Tuck	Saeed Hotary	Episode: "Rachel Ben Natan"
2008	The Border	Bomber	Episode: "Pockets of Vulnerability"
2007	NCIS	Asad Al-Qutaji	Episode: "Suspicion"
2006	E-Ring	Al-Qaeda Operative	Episode: "The Two Princes"

=== Theatre ===
Year	Title	Role	Venue
2018	Tethered	Nick Bernard	InHouse Theatre, Los Angeles, CA
2018	A Bright New Boise	Leory	InHouse Theatre, Los Angeles, CA
2016	Dinner With Friends	Gabe	InHouse Theatre, Los Angeles, CA
2011	Bread	Ali	Three Rose Players, Los Angeles, CA
2010	The Beautiful Ones	Avi	Village Theatre, Los Angeles, CA
2006	Vacancy	Mitch	Two Roads Theatre, Los Angeles, CA
2005	Lust and Crime	Antonio	The Actor's Playpen, Los Angeles, CA
2004	Mermaid's Tears	Jacob	Alumnae Theatre, Toronto, ON
2003	Black & White	Black	Toronto, ON
2003	Curtain Going Up	Buck O'Hara	Toronto, ON

== Awards ==
List of awards and nominations
Year	Award	Category	Result	Title
2018	Jury Award	Best Human Rights Film in International Open Film Festival	Won	Extinction
2017	Best Picture	Best Picture in Canadian Diversity Film Festival	Won	Extinction
2017	Best Short Film	Best Short Film in Canadian Diversity Film Festival	Won	Extinction
2017	Best Short Film	Best Short Dramatic Film in Hollywood Reel Independent Film Festival	Nominated	Extinction
2016	Best TV Pilot	Best Television Pilot in the International Open Film Festival	Won	Bloodlines
2011	Best Actor	Best Acting and Best Play in Three Rose Players Festival	Won	Bread
2011	Best Play	Best Acting and Best Play in Three Rose Players Festival	Won	Bread
2007	Best Film	San Francisco International LGBT Film Festival	Nominated	Donny & Ginger
2007	Best Film	SHOUT: The HBO GLBT Short Film Competition	Won	Donny & Ginger
