= Joseph Julian Soria =

American actor

- Born: August 28, 1986 (age 40); Los Angeles, California, U.S.
- Occupation: Actor
- Years active: 2004–present

Joseph Julian Soria (born August 28, 1986) is an American actor best known for his role as Private First Class Hector Cruz in the Lifetime series Army Wives and Pete Ramos in The Oath.

== Life and career ==
Soria was born in Los Angeles, California. His parents are Mexican. He joined the cast of Army Wives in 2012 for season 6. He was promoted to series regular for season 7 of the top-rated series.

He also starred as the lead antagonist, MC Wyatt, in the Pantelion Films and Olmos Productions film Filly Brown. The film premiered at the 2012 Sundance Film Festival as part of the U.S. Dramatic Competition. Soria plays opposite Gina Rodriguez in the film, which premiered to a limited distribution of 188 theaters on April 19, 2013. Before the film's release, the Filly Brown team mourned the loss of the film's supporting actress, Latin superstar Jenni Rivera, who died in a plane crash, along with six other individuals, near Iturbide, Nuevo León, Mexico, on December 9, 2012. Filly Brown was the fourth film to premiere at the Sundance Film Festival for Soria, his other films include All She Can (2011), High School (2010), and Hamlet 2 (2008). Soria additionally has a lead role the indie film Mission Park (later retitled Line of Duty), which premiered on September 6, 2013, by AMC Theatres.

On June 14, 2013, it was announced that Soria would join Kristen Stewart in Camp X-Ray, a political drama written and directed by Peter Sattler.

He currently stars as Erik Morales in the Netflix original Gentefied.

== Filmography ==
Film
Year	Film	Role	Notes
2004	Meeting a Bullet	Link	
2005	Bliss	Pablo	Short Film
2006	The Bondage	Spider	
2006	True Men	Thug #2	
2006	The Bliss	Pablo	
2006	Crank	Chico	
2007	She Wore a Yellow Scrunchy	Rico	Short Film
2007	Saturday Night Special	Danny DelToro	Short Film
2007	Trust Me	Luis	
2008	Hamlet 2	Octavio	
2008	Tru Loved	Manuel	
2008	Days of Wrath	Wito	
2008	The Cross Before Me	Ernie	
2009	Fast & Furious	Drug Runner	
2009	Crank: High Voltage	Chico	
2010	High School	Rubin	
2010	Assisting Venus	Paul	
2011	Benavides Born	Luis	
2012	Filly Brown	MC Wyatt	
2013	Mission Park	Derek	
2013	Enter the Dangerous Mind	College Student	
2014	Camp X-Ray	Pvt. Rico Cruz	
2014	10 Cent Pistol	Officer Hanna	
2015	Superfast!	Cesar Veracruz	
2015	Do You Believe?	Carlos	
2015	Max	Emilio	
2016	The Purge: Election Year	Marcos	
2016	Officer Downe	Lab Tech #2	
2020	John Henry	Emilio	

Television
Year	Film	Role	Notes
2005	The Shield	Spider	Episodes: "String Theory", "Insurgents"
2005–2010	CSI: Miami	Dario Aguilar / Hector Del Rio	Episodes: "Shootout", "On the hook"
2007	Lincoln Heights	Jesus	Episode: "Obsession"
2007	Brothers & Sisters	Garret Perez	"States of the Union"
2009	NCIS	Victor 'Popeye' Carmado	Episode: "Deliverance"
2009	The Closer	Alonso Garcia	Episode: "Half Load
2009	In Plain Sight	Cesar Calderon	Episode: "Jailbait"
2009	Bones	Pedro Marquez	Episode: "The Bond in the Boot"
2009–2010	Southland	Droopy / Hector Munoz	Episodes: "Phase Three" "Unknown Trouble"
2010	Lie to Me	Prince John	Episode: "Dirty Loyal"
2010	Sons of Anarchy	Roscoe	Episode: "Widening Gyre"
2010	Dexter	Carlos Fuentes	Episode: "Circle Us/Beauty and the Beast"
2012	Army Wives	Hector Cruz	Recurring role season 6; main role season 7
2014	Supernatural	Kuchisake-onna	Episode: "The Purge"
2014–2015	The Night Shift	Javy / Javier Castro	Episodes: "Grace Under Fire", "Parenthood"
2015	American Crime	Luis	Episodes: "Episode Five", "Episode Six"
2015	Complications	Alvarez	Episodes: "Diagnosis", "Relapse", "Deterioration"
2016	Grimm	Goyo	Episode: "Silence of the Slams"
2018–present	The Oath	Pete Ramos	Main role
2019	Hawaii Five-0	Tory Laiyaha	Episode: "E'ao lu'au a kualima"
2020–present	Gentefied	Erik	Main role
2022	The Flight Attendant	Esteban Diaz	Main role (season 2)
