= Will Rothhaar =

American actor (b. 1987)

- Born: William Edward Lamar Rothhaar; January 12, 1987 (age 39); New York City, U.S.
- Occupation: Actor
- Years active: 1994–present
- Mother: Nancy Linehan Charles

William Edward Lamar Rothhaar (born January 12, 1987) is an American actor.

== Early life ==
Rothhaar was born in New York City, the son of Michael Rothhaar and Nancy Linehan Charles, both of whom are playwrights, actors and directors.

He briefly lived in the little resort town of Boiling Springs, Pennsylvania, where he started doing theatre, but grew up on the west side of Los Angeles and attended Alexander Hamilton High School.

== Career ==
Rothhaar began acting in the mid-1990s, and appeared in several made-for-television films and series, including Buffy the Vampire Slayer and Mad About You. He had supporting roles in several feature films, including Jack Frost and Hearts in Atlantis. In 1999, he received The Hollywood Reporter "Young Star Award" for his portrayal of John in David Mamet's The Cryptogram at the Geffen Playhouse. Rothhaar's biggest role to date was the leading role in Kart Racer (2003). In 2004, he had a starring role on Listen Up. He appeared in Must Love Dogs (2005) and as Cpl. Lee Imlay in the alien-invasion film Battle: Los Angeles (2011). He appeared on two episodes of CSI: Crime Scene Investigation (in 2004 and 2010, respectively), CSI: Miami (2011), and CSI: NY (2012), playing different characters each time. In 2013, he starred as Lee Harvey Oswald in the television film Killing Kennedy.

== Filmography ==
=== Film ===
Year	Title	Role	Notes
1996	Kingpin	Young Roy Munson	
1996	American Strays	Jordan	
1998	Jack Frost	Dennis	
2000	Love & Sex	9-year-old Bobby	
2001	Hearts in Atlantis	John Sullivan	
2002	Now You Know	Eddy	
2003	Kart Racer	Watts Davies	
2005	Must Love Dogs	Jeremy	
2006	Love Is the Drug	Trevor	
2007	King of California	Security guard	
2008	33 Griffin Lane	Rodney	
2008	Just Add Water	Dirk	
2009	16 to Life	Carson	
2009	Print	Chase	
2010	Radio Free Albemuth	Ted Pollet	
2010	Piano Fingers	Young Howard	Short film
2011	Battle: Los Angeles	Cpl. Lee "Cowboy" Imlay	
2011	Getting That Girl	Ned Fouler	
2012	Within	Marc	Short film
2012	Mickey Finn	Corbin Kane	Short film
2013	Mission Park	Julian	
2014	The Last Dinner Party	Phil	Short film
2016	Like a Butterfly	Nick	
2016	Pale Blue	Ryan	Short film
2016	Wake Up America!	Joe	
2017	Division 19	Nash	
2018	Benji	Syd	
2020	Final Kill	Ron Wembly	

=== Television ===
Year	Title	Role	Notes
1994	Dave's World	—N/a	Episode: "Six Years Old and All Washed Up"
1995	Kidnapped: In the Line of Duty	Donny Lindstrom	Television film
1995	Letter to My Killer	Danny	Television film
1995	Dr. Quinn, Medicine Woman	School boy #2	2 episodes (1 uncredited)
1995–1998	JAG	Josh Pendry	4 episodes
1996	Innocent Victims	Matt Richardson	Television film
1996	Pacific Blue	Martin	Episode: "Point Blank"
1997	Journey of the Heart	Young Ray Johnston	Television film
1997	Spy Game	Kid	Episode: "Necessity Is the Mother of Infection"
1997	Buffy the Vampire Slayer	James	Episode: "Lie to Me"
1998	Mad About You	Logan	Episode: "The Coin of Destiny"
1999	Chicken Soup for the Soul	Michael	Episode: "From the Heart"
1999	Black and Blue	Robert Benedetto	Television film
2000	Fail Safe	Tommy Grady	Television film
2000	An American Daughter	Kip	Television film
2000	Hang Time	Kid #1	Episode: "At the Movies"
2001	ER	Robert "Bo" Borsalino	Episode: "Survival of the Fittest"
2001	On Golden Pond	Billy Ray	Television film
2001	Family Law	Gary	Episode: "Against All Odds"
2002	Judging Amy	Anthony Cossey	Episode: "Not Stumbling, But Dancing"
2002	The Guardian	Dale Fante	Episode: "The Living"
2004	CSI: Crime Scene Investigation	Rollercoaster operator	Episode: "Turn of the Screws"
2004–2005	Listen Up	Mickey Kleinman	Main cast; 22 episodes
2005	Criminal Minds	Cory Bridges	Episode: "The Popular Kids"
2006	Without a Trace	Matt Jameson	Episode: "The Road Home"
2006	Cold Case	Neal Hanlon in 1995	Episode: "Rampage"
2007	Standoff	Jerome "Rome" Kaden	Episode: "Kids in the Hall"
2007	K-Ville	Sean Rieger	Episode: "Critical Mass"
2008	Terminator: The Sarah Connor Chronicles	Martin Bedell	Episode: "Goodbye to All That"
2008	The Mentalist	Win	Episode: "Red Tide"
2009	Ghost Whisperer	Tim Dwight	Episode: "Slow Burn"
2010	CSI: Crime Scene Investigation	Sean Becker	Episode: "World's End"
2010	Fringe	Wyatt Toomy	Episode: "The Abducted"
2011	Memphis Beat	Dean Harrison	Episode: "The Feud"
2011	CSI: Miami	Ricky Galindo	Episode: "Countermeasures"
2012	CSI: NY	Luke Shelton	Episode: "Near Death"
2012	Perception	Eddie Leviseur	Episode: "Cipher"
2012–2013	Last Resort	Josh Brannan	7 episodes
2013	Killing Kennedy	Lee Harvey Oswald	Television film
2014	Reckless	Max Carlyle	Episode: "Bloodstone"
2014	Castle	Jared Stone	Episode: "Kill Switch"
2014–2015	Grimm	Officer Jesse Acker	3 episodes
2015	The Lizzie Borden Chronicles	Orin Trotwood	Episode: "Capsize"
2016	Code Black	Henry	Episode: "The Fifth Stage"

=== Web ===
Year	Title	Role	Notes
2009–11	Workshop	Junior Agent	9 episodes
2012–13	Sloppy Tacos	Wesleyan	2 episodes
2014	The Ladies Restroom	Dylan	3 episodes
2015	427	Officer Thompson	Episode: "Pilot"
