= Shark City =

- Directed by: Dan Eisen
- Written by: Evan Shear
- Produced by: Justin L. Levine; Howard Kerbal; Steve Muzzo
- Starring: Jefferson Brown; David J. Phillips; Carlo Rota; Jordan Madley; Samantha Gutstadt; Corey Haim; Vivica A. Fox
- Release dates: September 10, 2009 (Temecula Valley International Film Festival); November 1, 2009 (United States)
- Country: United States
- Language: English

Shark City is a 2009 comedy film directed by Dan Eisen and starring Jefferson Brown, David J. Phillips, Carlo Rota, Corey Haim, Vivica A. Fox, Jordan Madley, Samantha Gutstadt, and Tony Nappo; with Skye Collyer, Adam Rodness, Sean Tweedley, Michael Gelbart, and Dylan Ramsey. It was written by Evan Shear.

== Plot ==
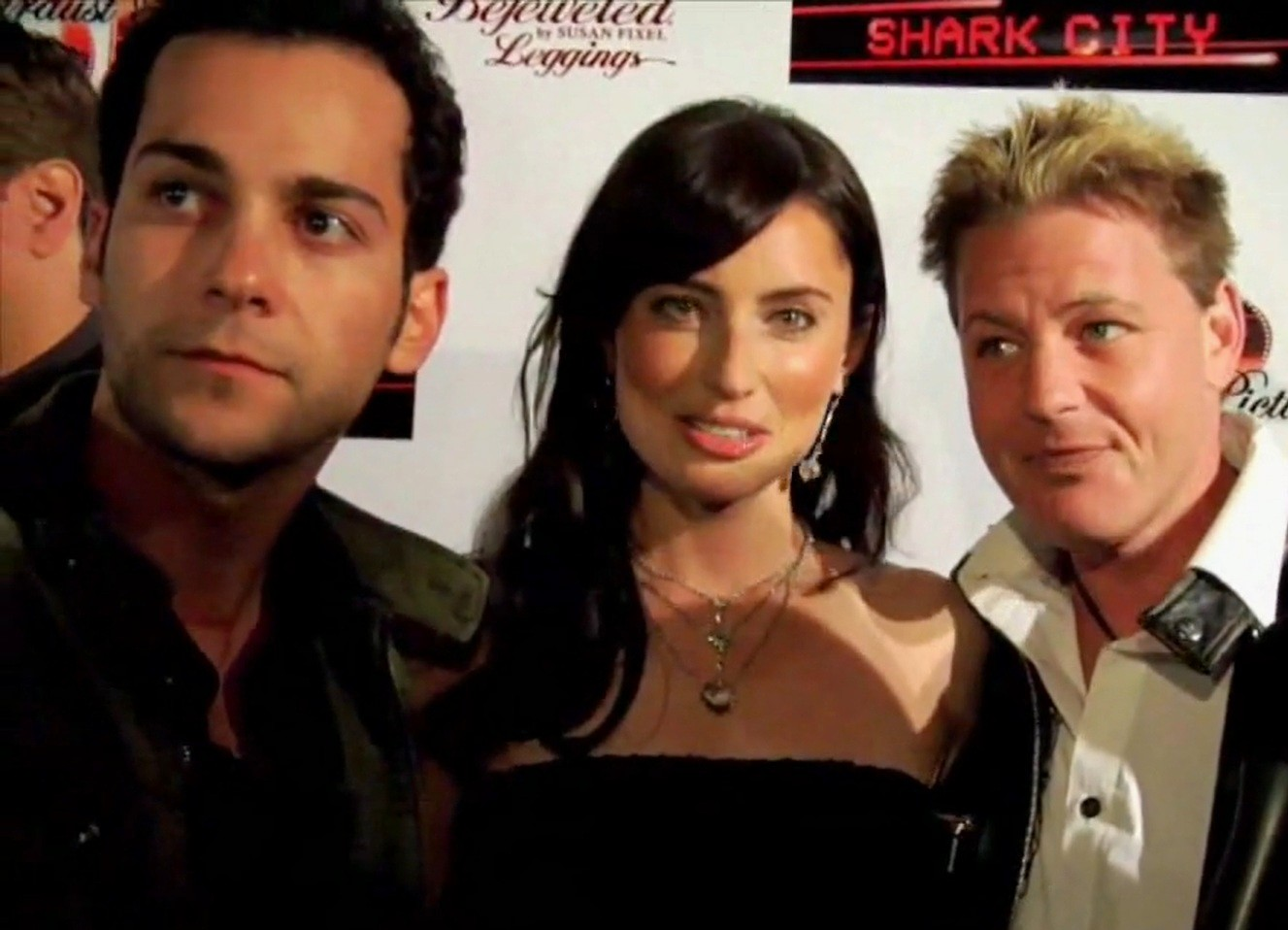
Left to right:Adam Rodness, Samantha Gutstadt, Corey Haim discuss Shark City in 2009

At the infamous club Shark City, successful roommates – real estate agent Dagen and stock broker Kenny, are the popular guys who get all the girls. One night Dagen meets Samantha, who he begins to pursue, but as she rejects him time and time again, he begins to actually fall in love with her though she is the daughter of the dangerous and powerful mob boss Ventura Ritt. Despite the declining housing market as reported by trusted news anchor Veronica Wolf, Dagen is able to sell a million dollar home to none other than Ventura Ritt, who is purchasing it for his daughter, whom Dagen admires.

Meanwhile, after losing his job as a day-trader, his best friend Kenny, an amazing poker player, is in need of a new opportunity to make some cash. The two friends scheme a way to get Ventura Ritt to play in a poker game to earn their trust. Their plans succeed, and making some risky bets with help of his old secretary, Jen, Kenny starts to make Ventura a lot of money – so Ventura then trusts him with a million dollars. However, Kennyʼs luck changes, and in an attempt to make Ventura even more money, he loses every penny. After much work Dagen convinces Samantha that he is not the club scumbag she thinks he is, and they begin successfully dating until a girl from Dagenʼs past shows up unexpectedly and kisses him as Samantha sees, confirming her past fears about him. Dagen and Kenny try to secure the money for the mob boss, Dagen regains Samantha's trust, and the boys discover each other's friendship again.

== Cast ==
- Jefferson Brown as Kenny
- David L. Phillips as Dagen
- Carlo Rota as Ventura Ritt
- Jordan Madley as Samantha Ritt
- Samantha Gutstadt as Jen
- Corey Haim as Chip Davis
- Vivica A. Fox as Veronica Wolf
- Tony Nappo as Al
- Skye Collyer as Mindy
- Michael Gelbart as Howard
- Adam Rodness as Gerry
- Sean Tweedley as Skippy
- Dylan Ramsey as Teddy

== Production ==
The language of the film is English.

It was filmed in Toronto, Ontario, Canada.

The world premiere of the film took place on March 28, 2009 in Los Angeles. In Canada, the film was screened during the Toronto Film Festival (was not part of the TIFF) on Friday, September 11, 2009.

This film has screenings during the 2009 Toronto International Film Festival (was not part of the TIFF), Chicago International Film Festival (was not part of the CIFF), and the Temecula Valley International Film Festival (was not part of TVIFF).

The film makes repeated references to Texas hold 'em poker.
