= Troy Brooks =

Canadian painter

- Born: September 23, 1972 (age 53); Chatham, Ontario, Canada
- Occupation: Artist

Troy Brooks (born September 23, 1972) is a Canadian painter. His art is narrative film noir style portraits of elongated female protagonists which are part of the contemporary Pop Surrealism scene. The Globe and Mail wrote in a 2018 review titled "A Road Trip into Our Psyches"; "a typical Brooks she-devil subject has an elongated face and body, is dead white, dressed elaborately, surrounded by weird animal familiars and/or horrific accidents, and is perhaps transgendered."

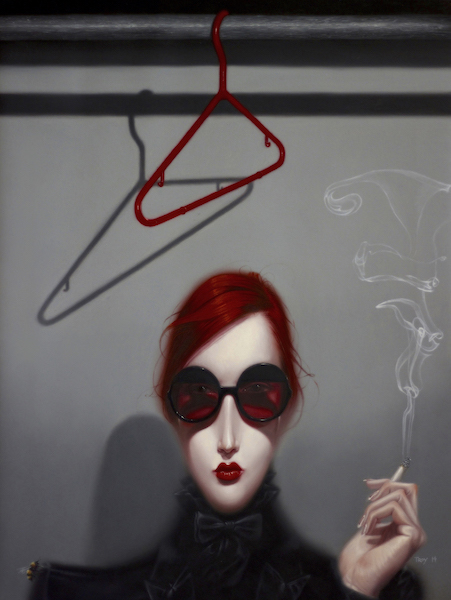
"The Wallflower Opus" - 2014 oil on canvas painting by Canadian artist Troy Brooks

Brooks's female subjects are confrontational and mannerist in style. Dubbed The Women Of Troy in contemporary art magazines like Juxtapoz and Hi-Fructose Magazine Brooks's images of unsettling female characters have been exhibited internationally.

== Early life ==
Brooks was born asthmatic and suffered a handful of odd illnesses throughout his youth, including several skin diseases and deadly allergies. He became preoccupied with classic Hollywood films of the ’30s and ’40s and later incorporated many of the archetypes and concepts into his work. Brooks suffered serious and sometimes extreme bullying in school. In a 2016 WOWXWOW interview, he stated that, as a result, he “grew up in a constant state of fear and humiliation and my art was the only outlet where I felt I had any authority". Brooks attributes his interest in painting to his mother, who was an amateur watercolorist. He remembers watching her paint when he was two years old and drawing beside her easel. His first drawings were of Wonder Woman.

== Influences and works ==
Brooks received no formal training, working in traditional oils. Cited influences include Lisa Yuskavage, Otto Dix, and Kees van Dongen. His use of dramatic light and shadow echoes the 1940s film noir productions of Warner Brothers and MGM. Brook’s subject matter is near exclusively portraits of women with protracted faces and bodies. They are often dressed elaborately and paired somehow with animal familiars or accidents. They are observed in transformative moments. In a 2017 interview, Brooks said that "the only way to generate any depth in my work is to avoid thinking about it and stay completely intuitive."

== Public works ==
In 2014, as part of the World Pride Church Street Mural Project, mural artist Christiano De Araujo worked with Brooks to reproduce his painting "Tower" as a mural. The image stands on the south wall of a two-story building at 418 Church St. in Toronto. It was created as a tribute to those arrested and harassed in the 1981 Toronto bath-house police raids. The image shows a drag queen in a confrontational pose against the police.

== Accolades ==
Brooks was inducted into the Chatham-Kent Cultural Hall of Fame in 2025 in recognition of his contributions to the visual arts.
