= Jeremy Ray Valdez =

American actor and musician (born 1980)

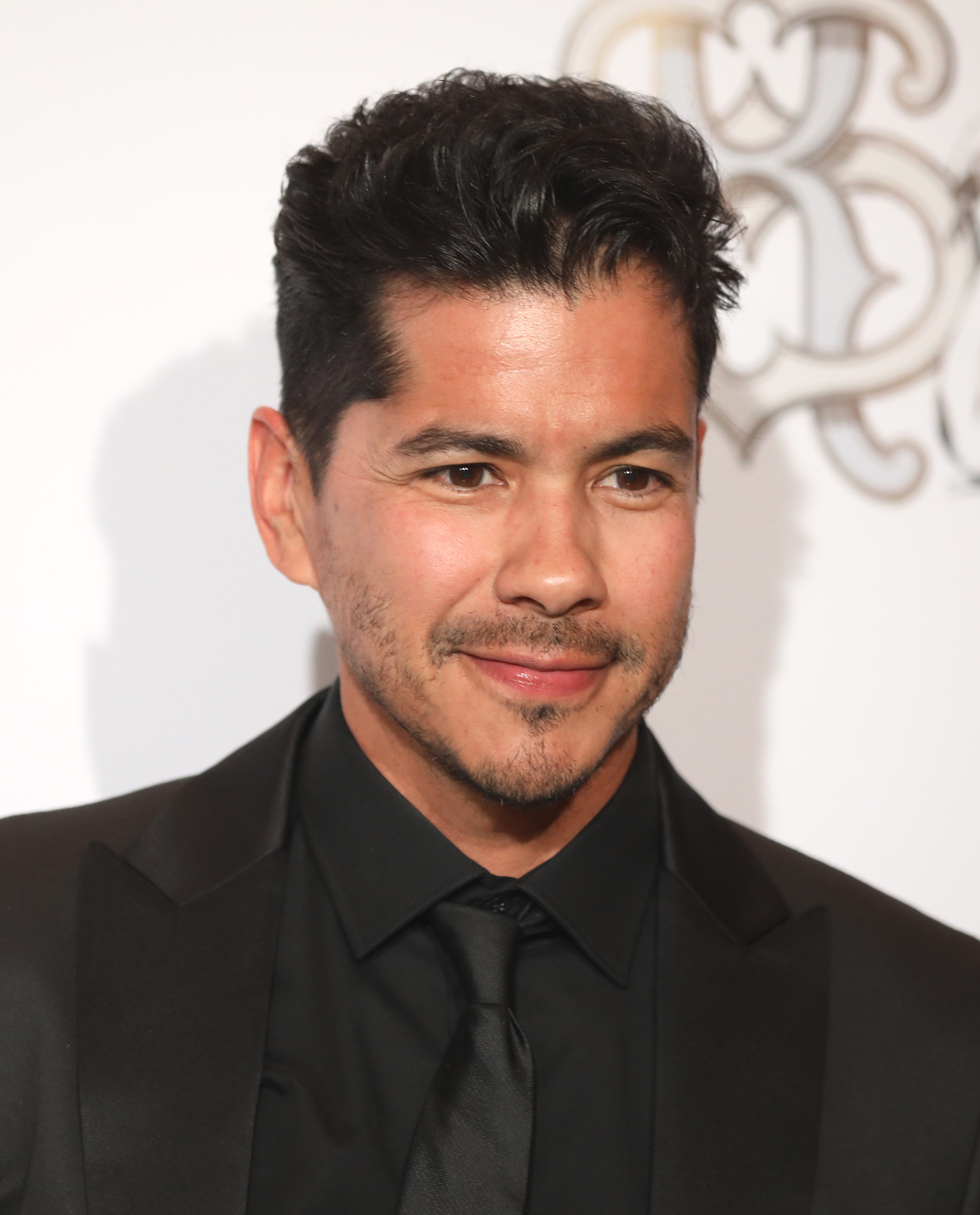
- Valdez in 2024
- Born: July 10, 1980 (age 45); Santa Fe, New Mexico, U.S.
- Occupations: Actor, musician
- Years active: 2000–present

Jeremy Ray Valdez (born July 10, 1980) is an American actor and musician. He won the 2010 Imagen Award for Best Supporting Actor in a Feature Film for his role in La Mission.

== Early life ==
Valdez was born in Santa Fe, New Mexico in 1980. His father is of Mexican heritage and his mother is of Navajo descent.

== Career ==
Valdez began his career in national commercials for Coca-Cola, McDonald's, Six Flags, Verizon Communications, and Toys "R" Us. Valdez landed his first television role on The Brothers Garcia.

Valdez has appeared in recurring roles on television shows including ER, Veronica Mars, Drake & Josh and guest starring roles on The Closer, NCIS, 24, CSI: NY, JAG, The Shield, CSI: Miami, Without a Trace, That's So Raven, Medical Investigation, Boston Public and One on One. He also starred in the HBO TV Movie, Walkout, directed by Edward James Olmos. Valdez portrays Robert Avila, an undercover police officer who poses as a high school student, in the film based on the true story of the five Mexican-American East LA high schools that organized a walkout in 1968 to protest poor school conditions. Additionally, Jeremy starred in Junkyard Saints, a film which was featured on the PBS series Independent Lens. He also played the role of Adan in the film, Blaze You Out, directed by Mateo Frazier and Diego Joaquin Lopez in 2013.

Valdez starred in the 2010 independent hit La Mission. Jeremy has garnered accolades and success from his role as Jesse Rivera in the film. These include a 2010 IMAGEN Award for "Best Supporting Actor". La Mission stars Valdez, alongside Benjamin Bratt, and was featured at the 2009 Sundance Film Festival. Jeremy also starred opposite Charles S. Dutton in the upcoming film, "The Obama Effect". In 2010 he was cast in Allan Ball's newest pilot for HBO, "All Signs of Death". In the spring of 2010, Valdez starred in the feature film Benavides Born, filmed in South Texas. Benavides Born was selected to premiere at the 2011 Sundance Film Festival, in competition. This marked the second film in two years that Jeremy had starred in a film that was included in the Sundance Film Festival.

In March 2018 Valdez joined the cast of The Bold and the Beautiful as Detective Alex Sanchez.

== Filmography ==
=== Film ===
Year	Title	Role	Notes
2000	Land of a Thousand Dances	Frankie Cannibal	
2003	Graduation Night	Young Man	
2005	Constantine	Liquor Store Clerk Nico	
2009	La Mission	Jes Rivera	
2011	All She Can	Raynaldo	
2012	Fortress	Tom	Direct-to-video
2012	The Obama Effect	Hector Santiago Jr.	
2013	Mission Park	Bobby	
2013	Dreamer	Joe	
2013	Blaze You Out	Adan	
2014	Bad Asses	Manny	Direct-to-video
2016	H.O.M.E.	Danny	
2019	12 Pups of Christmas	Wally	

=== Television ===
Year	Title	Role	Notes
2001	The Brothers García	Butter	Episode: "Band on the Run"
2001	The Nightmare Room	Spencer Turner	Episode: "The Howler"
2001	Family Law	Enrique	Episode: "My Brother's Keeper"
2001	Taylor's Wall	Arturo	Television film
2001	Boston Public	Jerry	Episode: "Chapter Twenty-Four"
2002	American Family	Young Eduardo	2 episodes
2002	Home of the Brave	Artimeo Garcia	Television film
2003	That's So Raven	Ricky	2 episodes
2003	Without a Trace	Theo Rodriguez	Episode: "A Tree Falls"
2004	CSI: Miami	Carlos Gonzalez	Episode: "Blood Moon"
2004	Drake & Josh	Paul	4 episodes
2004	The Shield	Esteban	Episode: "Blood and Water"
2004	One on One	Raffy	Episode: "Sleepless in Baltimore"
2004	JAG	Corporal Gabrial Salazar	Episode: "This Just in from Baghdad"
2005	CSI: NY	Antonio Reyes	Episode: "The Dove Commission"
2005	Medical Investigation	Nestor	2 episodes
2005	ER	Roberto Rosales	2 episodes
2006	Walkout	Robert Avila	Television film
2006	Veronica Mars	Marcos Oliveres	2 episodes
2006	24	Tim Rooney	Episode: "Day 5: 5:00 a.m.-6:00 a.m."
2007	The Rookie: CTU	Jason Blaine	12 episodes
2008	The Rookie: Day 3 Extraction	Jason Blaine	Miniseries
2009	The Closer	Tommy Martinez	Episode: "Half Load"
2010	NCIS	Alfonso Vega	Episode: "Masquerade"
2010	All Signs of Death	Jaime Abarca	Television film
2012	Longmire	Vehoe Roundstone	Episode: "Unfinished Business"
2013	Castle	Todd	Episode: "The Wild Rover"
2015	The Mentalist	Pedro Orosco	Episode: "Green Light"
2018, 2019	The Lion Guard	Cek	2 episodes
2018–present	The Bold and the Beautiful	Detective Alex Sanchez	33 episodes
