= Douglas Spain =

American actor

- Born: April 15, 1974 (age 51); Los Angeles, California
- Occupation(s): Actor, director, producer
- Years active: 1993–present

Douglas Spain (born April 15, 1974) is an American film and television actor, director and producer. In 1998 Spain was nominated for an Independent Spirit Award in the category of Best Debut Performance for his role in the film Star Maps. In 1999 he won the Rising Star Award at the Marco Island Film Festival for The Last Best Sunday and in 2006 he won the Camie award at the Character and Morality in Entertainment Awards for his part in The Reading Room. He has since appeared in various features, including Permanent Midnight, But I'm a Cheerleader, A Time for Dancing, What's Cooking?, Cherry Falls, Delivering Milo and Still Green.

On television, Spain appeared in Band of Brothers, and has made guest appearances on Star Trek: Voyager, Pacific Blue, Nash Bridges, Brooklyn South, Becker, The Practice, JAG, Family Law, CSI: Miami, The Mentalist, NCIS, and House M.D. He has directed the films Charity, Online, Crazy, Crazy Too and The Monster.

== Personal life ==
Spain came out as gay via Facebook on January 26, 2012, and in an interview with The Advocate on January 27, 2012.

== Filmography ==
- 1995: Star Trek: Voyager as young Chakotay in Season 2 Episode 9
- 1997: Riot as Manuel
- 1997: 12 Angry Men as The Accused
- 1998: Star Maps as Carlos Amado
- 1998: Ricochet River as Jesse Howl
- 1998: Permanent Midnight as Miguel
- 1998: Becker as Javier Cruz in Season 1 Episode 15
- 1999: But I'm a Cheerleader as Andre
- 2000: A Time for Dancing as Mike
- 2000: What's Cooking? as Tony Avila
- 2000: Cherry Falls as Mark
- 2000: Rave as Daffy
- 2001: Delivering Milo as Mr. Gordon
- 2001: Band of Brothers (TV miniseries) as Pvt. Antonio Garcia
- 2005: Next Exit as Charles
- 2005: The Reading Room (TV movie) as Javier
- 2006: Walkout (HBO) as Dave Sanchez
- 2007: Still Green as Milo
- 2007: Carts as Roberto
- 2007: The Memory Thief as Dominic
- 2008: Hotel California as Manny Ramos
- 2008: The Mentalist as Hector Romerez
- 2009: American Cowslip as Jorge
- 2017: Badsville as Charlie (also producer)
- 2019: The Assent as Brother Michael
