= Angela McEwan =

American actress (1934–2015)

- Born: April 23, 1934; Santa Monica, California, US
- Died: December 20, 2015 (aged 81); Long Beach, California, US
- Education: University of California, Irvine
- Occupation: Actress
- Years active: 2003–2015
- Spouse: Guillermo McEwan
- Children: 2 sons

Angela McEwan (April 23, 1934 – December 20, 2015) was an American actress, best known for her roles in Nebraska and Getting On. She also appeared in Parks and Recreation and New Girl.

== Early years ==
McEwan was born in Santa Monica, California on April 23, 1934. She studied acting at the Los Angeles City College for one year, then transferred to the University of California at Los Angeles, where she met and married her husband, Nicaraguan gastroenterologist Guillermo McEwan. They moved to Mexico City, where he continued his medical studies and began his career. After returning to California via Temple, Texas, where she received a bachelor's degree from the University of Mary Hardin–Baylor, McEwan obtained a master's degree in Spanish from University of California, Irvine and worked as an interpreter in criminal court.

== Career ==
When her husband died in 2009, McEwan decided to make another attempt at an acting career, working on multiple television shows before landing a film role in Nebraska.

== Death ==
McEwan died in Long Beach, California on December 20, 2015, aged 81, from lung cancer. Survivors included two sons and three grandchildren.

== Filmography ==
Year	Title	Role	Notes
2007	Callback	Old Woman	
2010	Radio Free Albemuth	Mrs. Aramchek	Uncredited
2013	Nebraska	Peg Nagy	
2016	Moments of Clarity	Mrs. Erickson	
2016	Élan Vital	Ballroom Dancer	
2016	Boonville Redemption	Iris	(final film role)
