= Eat Wheaties! =

2020 Canadian comedy film

- Film poster
- Directed by: Scott Abramovitch
- Written by: Scott Abramovitch
- Based on: The Locklear Letters by Michael Kun
- Produced by: Scott Abramovitch; David J. Phillips
- Starring: Tony Hale; Paul Walter Hauser; Danielle Brooks; Elisha Cuthbert
- Cinematography: Phil Miller
- Edited by: Salamo Levin
- Music by: Kevin Krouglow
- Production company: Embelle Films
- Distributed by: Screen Media Films
- Release date: September 25, 2020 (CIFF)
- Running time: 89 minutes
- Country: Canada
- Language: English

Eat Wheaties! is a 2020 Canadian comedy film written and directed by Scott Abramovitch, and produced by Abramovitch and David J. Phillips. The film is an adaptation of Michael Kun's 2003 novel The Locklear Letters updated for the social media era. It stars Tony Hale as Sid Straw, a man who becomes co-chair of the University of Pennsylvania planning committee for his college reunion, only to become obsessed with proving that he was friends with actress Elizabeth Banks in their student days.

== Plot ==
Sid is a software company manager who is asked to help plan a reunion for West Coast graduates of the University of Pennsylvania. One of the graduates is Elizabeth Banks. She knew him in college and Sid sends her numerous messages, not realizing they are public. Elizabeth's agent Frankie finds out he is sending the messages and gets concerned that Sid is a stalker. Sid asks for an autographed photo for his brother Tom's birthday but it is messed up and he has to ask for a replacement. Frankie finally has a restraining order issued which Sid vows to fight. However, Sid goes viral and loses his job. Sid finds a cheap lawyer James to fight the restraining order but has to wait for the lawyer to pass the bar. When Sid goes before a judge he is unable to produce sufficient evidence to get the restraining order dropped. As the judge is about to rule, Sid remembers the story of how Elizabeth inspired the volleyball team to play harder against a very good team. The judge rules in Sid's favor. Sid goes to the reunion and gets another job. Tom's wife gives birth and while Sid is visiting he gets a phone call. Though he doesn't answer, Elizabeth is heard by the movie audience leaving a message telling Sid how she remembers him fondly and has been filming a movie out of the country. As she used to do, she says goodbye by saying, "Eat Wheaties."

== Cast ==
- Tony Hale as Sid Straw
- Paul Walter Hauser as James Fisk
- Danielle Brooks as Wendy
- Elisha Cuthbert as Janet Berry-Straw
- Sarah Chalke as Frankie Riceborough
- Lamorne Morris as Sam Haller
- David Walton as Tom Straw
- Alan Tudyk as Dave Lambert
- Robbie Amell as Brandon
- Hayden Szeto as Keaton
- Rizwan Manji as Bruce Rapp
- Sarah Goldberg as Jeanne
- Sarah Burns as Kate
- Emmanuelle Vaugier as Sarah Getz
- Sugar Lyn Beard as Carla Fisk
- Phil Reeves as Earl Straw
- Mimi Kennedy as Edna Straw
- Kristian Bruun as Burke
- Enuka Okuma as Michelle the Lawyer
- Kristen Gutoskie as Suzie the Bankteller
- Kylie Bunbury as Allison
- David J. Phillips as Vic Frankel

== Release ==
The film premiered on September 25, 2020 at the Calgary International Film Festival, and had its American premiere at the Heartland Film Festival in October 2020 where it was the Opening Night film and won the Humor And Humanity Award. It was subsequently screened at the 2020 San Diego International Film Festival, winning the Best Comedy Award, and the 2020 Whistler Film Festival, where Norman Wilner of Now wrote that "If any movie at this festival has a chance at cult status, it’s this one." It was released theatrically and on VOD in the United States on April 30, 2021 by Screen Media Films and won the Best Feature Film and People's Choice Best Feature Film awards at the 2022 Borrego Springs Film Festival as well as the Best Feature Film, Humor/Satire at 2022's Filmfest Bremen.

== Production ==
Eat Wheaties was primarily filmed in Vancouver. There was also location shooting in the Los Angeles area which filled in for Arizona, which is where the film is set.

== Reception ==
On the review aggregator website Rotten Tomatoes, 69% of 35 critics' reviews are positive. The website's consensus reads: "It frequently fumbles its attempts to balance cringe comedy and sincere drama, but Tony Hale's charm helps keep Eat Wheaties! from getting soggy." Metacritic, which uses a weighted average, assigned the film a score of 40 out of 100, based on 8 critics, indicating "mixed or average" reviews.

Lou Harry of the Midwest Film Journal gave the film a positive review, writing: "Eat Wheaties! is one of my favorite films this year. Honestly. It's got the cringe-laughs of a good episode of Curb Your Enthusiasm but with a sweet, gentle heart beating inside it." Gabriel Sigler of Bad Feeling wrote that "Eat Wheaties! is one of the most enjoyable films of the year." The critical consensus on Rotten Tomatoes reads, "It frequently fumbles its attempts to balance cringe comedy and sincere drama, but Tony Hale's charm helps keep Eat Wheaties! from getting soggy."

Richard Roeper's three star (out of four) review in the Chicago Sun Times noted "in the hands of writer-director Scott Abramovitch and with the considerable contributions of an outstanding cast that also includes Kylie Bunbury ('Big Sky') and Paul Walter Hauser ('Richard Jewell'), 'Eat Wheaties' is a dryly funny, even sweet and surprisingly touching story".
