= Molar Tooth (Washington) =

Mountain in Washington (state), United States

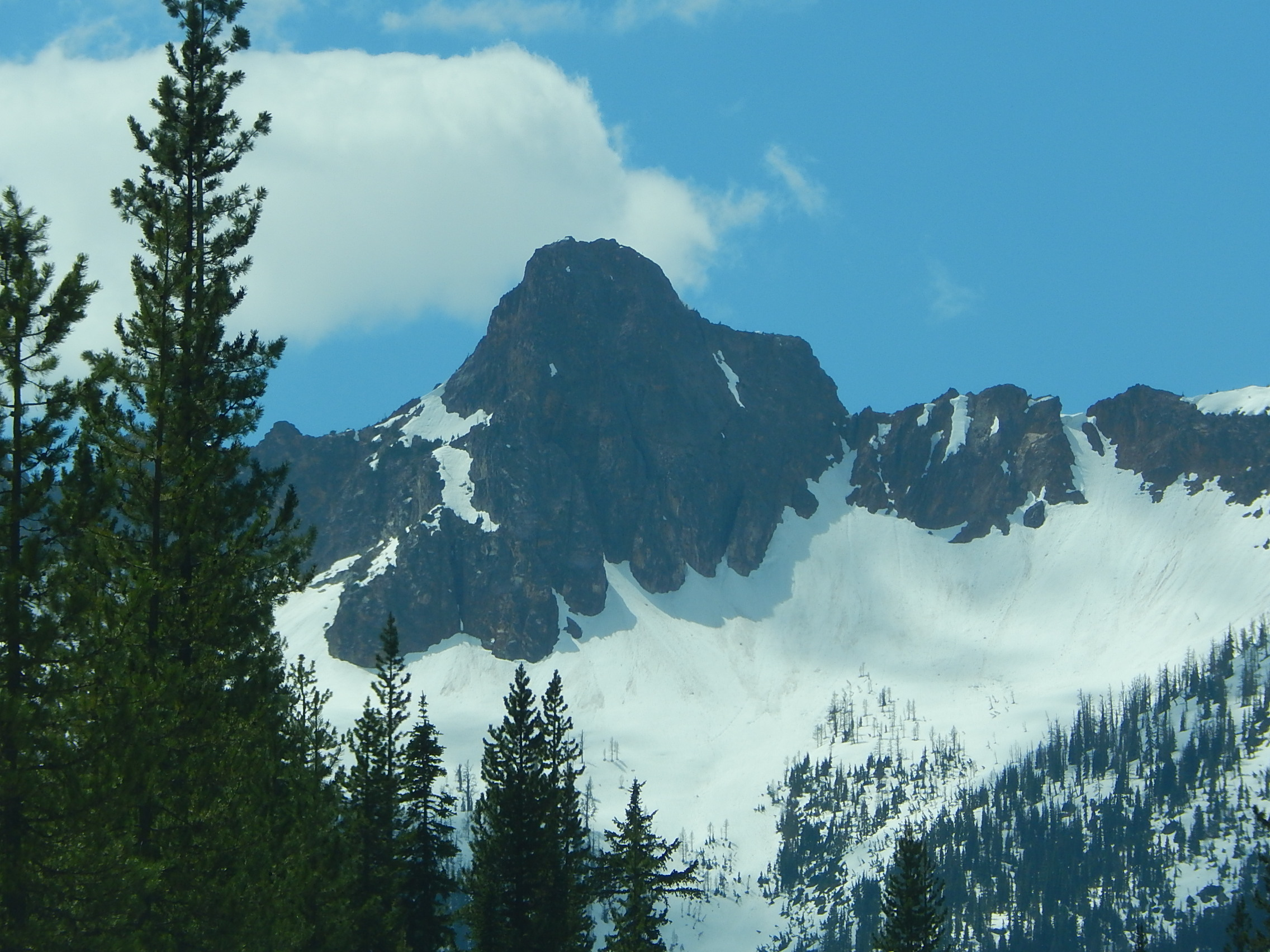
- East aspect, from the road to Cutthroat Lake Trail

Highest point
- Elevation: 7,547 ft (2,300 m)
- Prominence: 427 ft (130 m)
- Parent peak: Cutthroat Peak
- Isolation: 0.62 mi (1.00 km)
- Coordinates: 48°32′22″N 120°42′27″W

Geography
- Location within Washington (state) Location within the United States
- Interactive map of Molar Tooth
- Country: United States
- State: Washington
- County: Okanogan / Skagit
- Parent range: Cascade Range
- Topo map: USGS Washington Pass

Geology
- Rock type: Granite

Climbing
- First ascent: September 19, 1971 by Alex Bertiulis with Charles and Patricia Raymond
- Easiest route: Scrambling class 4

Molar Tooth is a 7,547-foot-elevation (2,300-meter) granite summit located on the shared border of Okanogan County and Skagit County, in Washington state. The mountain is part of the Okanagan Range which is a subrange of the Cascade Range. Set in the Okanogan–Wenatchee National Forest, Molar Tooth is situated south of Cutthroat Pass, and 0.57 miles (0.92 km) north of Cutthroat Peak, which is also the nearest higher peak. The easiest climbing route is class 4 scrambling, but solid rock provides class 5 technical routes as well. Precipitation runoff from the east side of Molar Tooth drains into tributaries of the Methow River, whereas runoff from the west side drains into tributaries of the Skagit River.

== Climate ==
Molar Tooth is located in the marine west coast climate zone of western North America. Weather fronts originating in the Pacific Ocean move northeast toward the Cascade Mountains. As fronts approach the North Cascades, they are forced upward by the peaks of the Cascade Range (orographic lift), causing them to drop their moisture in the form of rain or snowfall onto the Cascades. As a result, the west side of the North Cascades experiences high precipitation, especially during the winter months in the form of snowfall. Because of maritime influence, snow tends to be wet and heavy, resulting in high avalanche danger. During winter months, weather is usually cloudy, but due to high pressure systems over the Pacific Ocean that intensify during summer months, there is often little or no cloud cover during the summer.

== Geology ==
The North Cascades features some of the most rugged topography in the Cascade Range with craggy peaks, ridges, and deep glacial valleys. Geological events occurring many years ago created the diverse topography and drastic elevation changes over the Cascade Range leading to the various climate differences. These climate differences lead to vegetation variety defining the ecoregions in this area.

The history of the formation of the Cascade Mountains dates back millions of years ago to the late Eocene Epoch. With the North American Plate overriding the Pacific Plate, episodes of volcanic igneous activity persisted. In addition, small fragments of the oceanic and continental lithosphere called terranes created the North Cascades about 50 million years ago. Molar Tooth is part of the Golden Horn Batholith.

During the Pleistocene period dating back over two million years ago, glaciation advancing and retreating repeatedly scoured the landscape leaving deposits of rock debris. The U-shaped cross section of the river valleys is a result of recent glaciation. Uplift and faulting in combination with glaciation have been the dominant processes which have created the tall peaks and deep valleys of the North Cascades area.

== Gallery ==
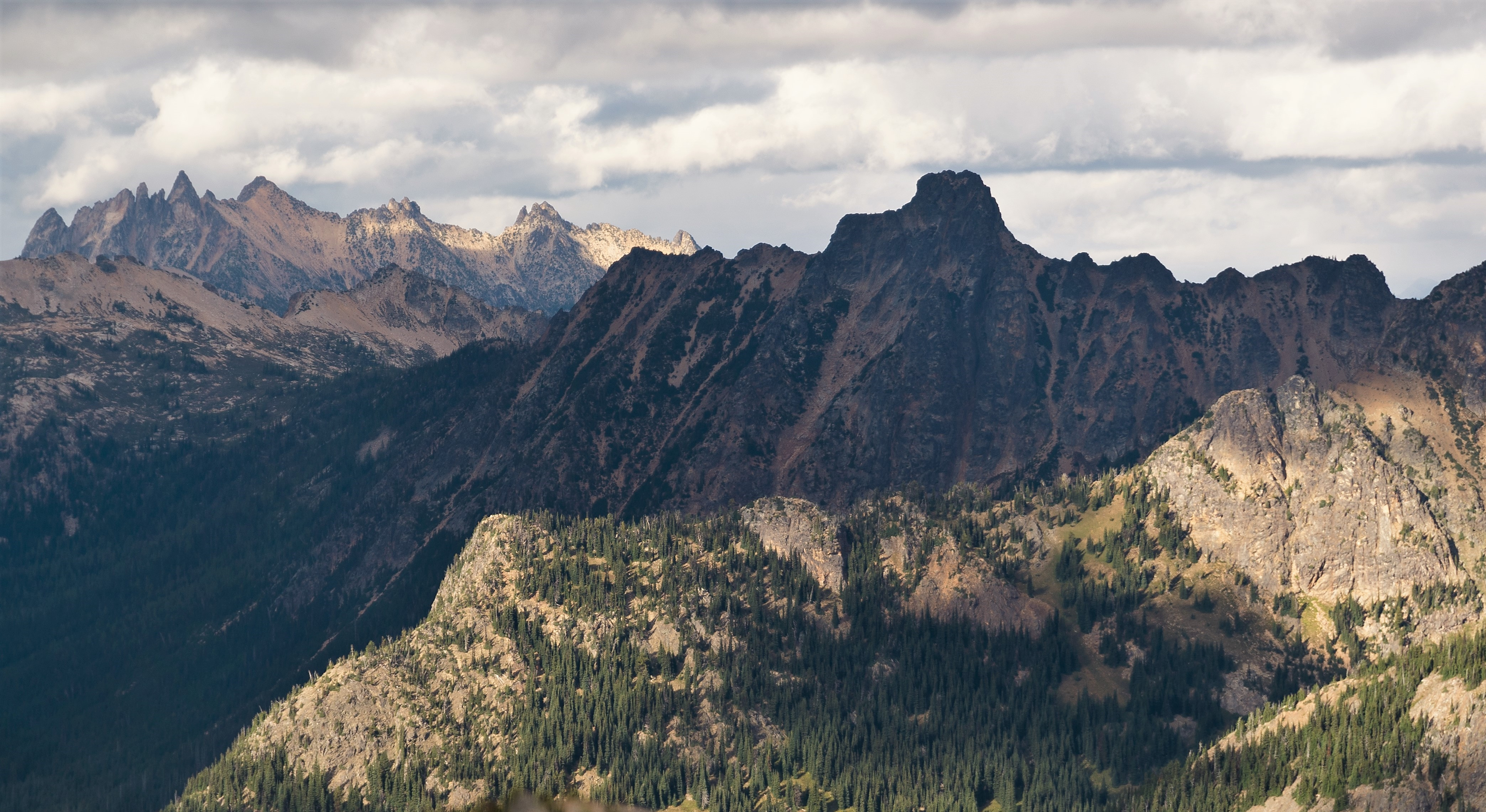
The Needles (left) and Molar Tooth (shaded) from the southwest

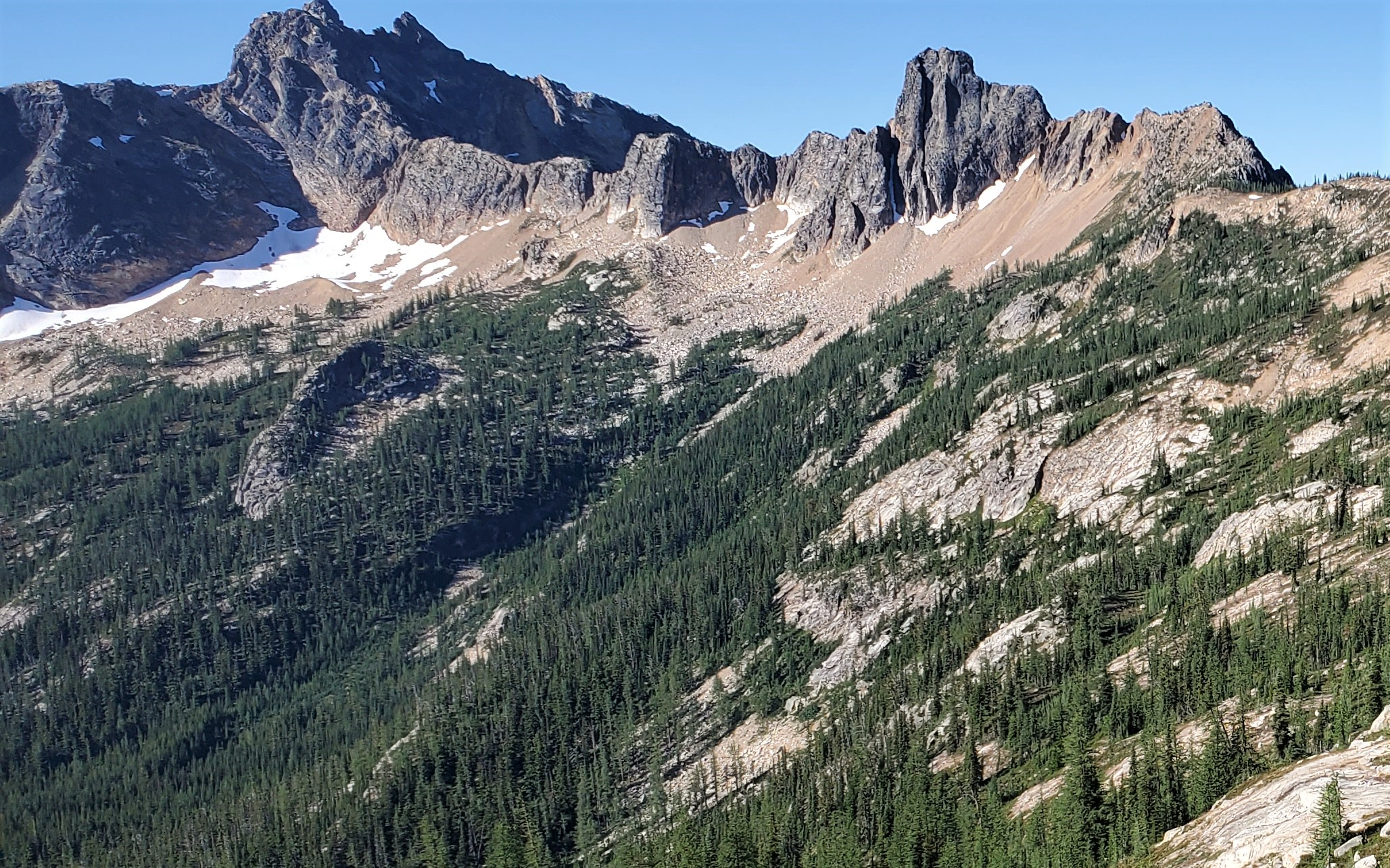
Cutthroat Peak (left) and Molar Tooth seen from Cutthroat Pass

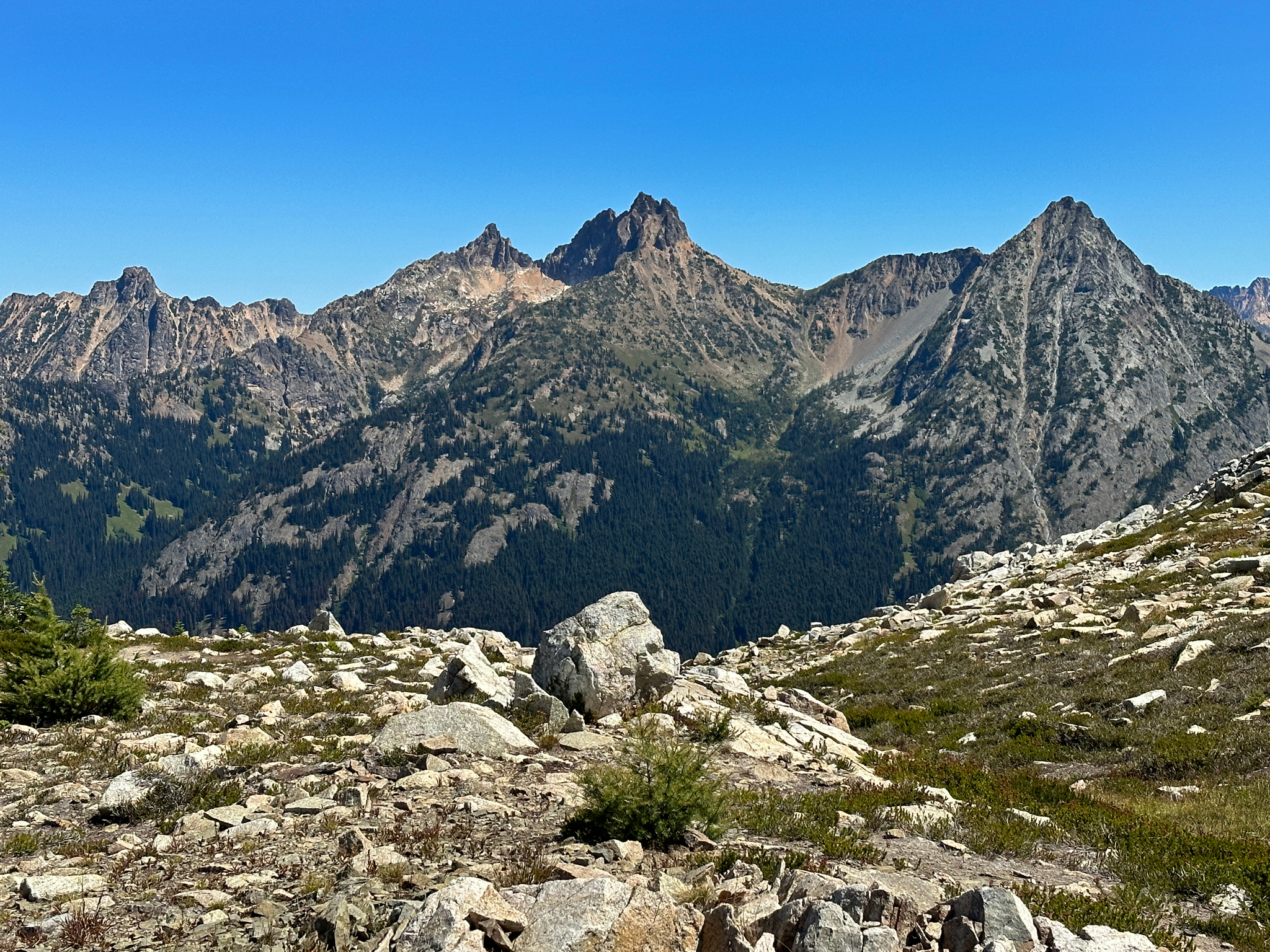
Molar Tooth (left), Cutthroat Peak (center) and Whistler Mountain (right) viewed from Maple Pass trail

== See also ==
- Geography of the North Cascades
