= Mount Carru =

Mountain in Washington (state), United States

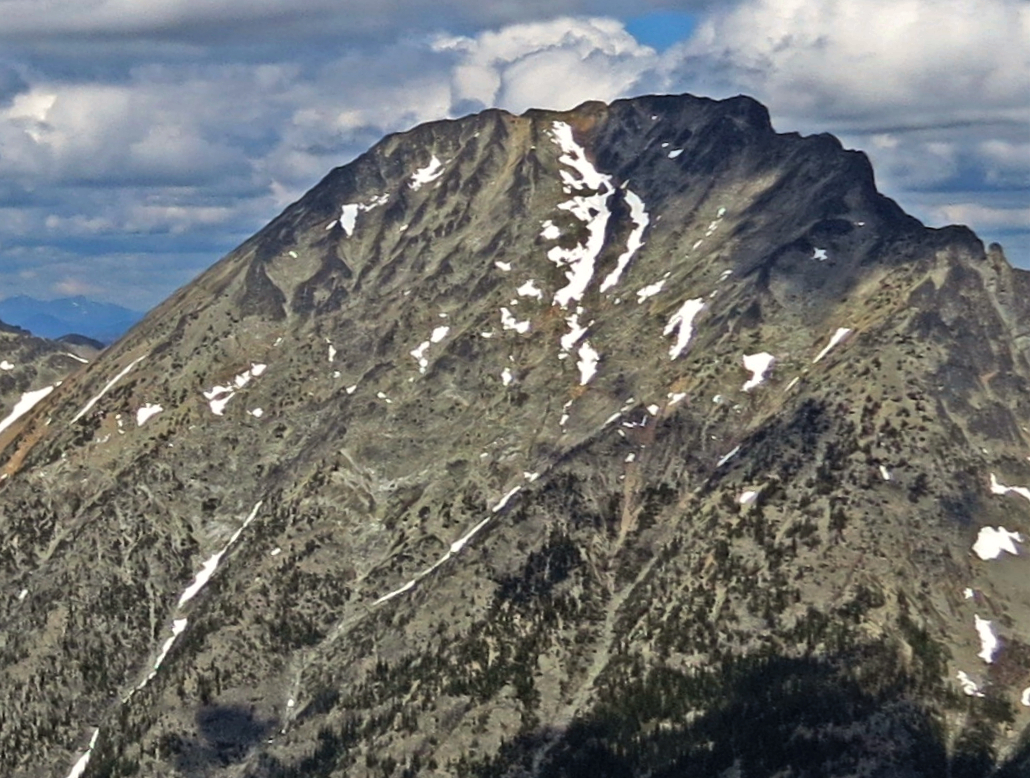
- Mount Carru, southeast aspect

Highest point
- Elevation: 8,595 ft (2,620 m)
- Prominence: 955 ft (291 m)
- Parent peak: Mount Lago
- Isolation: 0.79 mi (1.27 km)
- Listing: Highest Peaks in Washington
- Coordinates: 48°49′55″N 120°33′12″W

Geography
- Location within Washington (state) Location within the United States
- Interactive map of Mount Carru
- Country: United States
- State: Washington
- County: Okanogan
- Protected area: Pasayten Wilderness
- Parent range: Okanogan Range; North Cascades; Cascade Range
- Topo map: USGS Mount Lago

Climbing
- First ascent: 1933 by Hermann Ulrichs and Richard Alt
- Easiest route: Scrambling class 3 south slope

Mount Carru is an 8,595-foot (2,620-metre) mountain summit located in western Okanogan County in Washington state. It is the seventh-highest peak of the Okanogan Range, which is a sub-range of the North Cascades. The mountain is situated in the Pasayten Wilderness on land administered by the Okanogan–Wenatchee National Forest. The nearest higher peak is Mount Lago, 0.8 mile (1.3 km) to the east, and Osceola Peak rises one mile (1.6 km) west. The mountain has a steep north face, but the south slope is covered in scree which allows a nontechnical climbing ascent. Precipitation runoff from Mount Carru drains north into Lease Creek which is a tributary of the Pasayten River, or south into Eureka Creek, which is part of the Methow River drainage basin.

== Climate ==
Weather fronts originating in the Pacific Ocean travel northeast toward the Cascade Mountains. As fronts approach the North Cascades, they are forced upward by the peaks of the Cascade Range (orographic lift), causing them to drop their moisture in the form of rain or snowfall onto the Cascades. As a result, the west side of the North Cascades experiences high precipitation, especially during the winter months in the form of snowfall. During winter months, weather is usually cloudy, but due to high pressure systems over the Pacific Ocean that intensify during summer months, there is often little or no cloud cover during the summer.

== Geology ==
The North Cascades feature some of the most rugged topography in the Cascade Range with craggy peaks, spires, ridges, and deep glacial valleys. Geological events occurring many years ago created the diverse topography and drastic elevation changes over the Cascade Range leading to various climate differences.

The history of the formation of the Cascade Mountains dates back millions of years ago to the late Eocene Epoch. With the North American Plate overriding the Pacific Plate, episodes of volcanic igneous activity persisted. In addition, small fragments of the oceanic and continental lithosphere called terranes created the North Cascades about 50 million years ago.

During the Pleistocene period dating back over two million years ago, glaciation advancing and retreating repeatedly scoured the landscape leaving deposits of rock debris. The U-shaped cross section of the river valleys is a result of recent glaciation. Uplift and faulting in combination with glaciation have been the dominant processes which have created the tall peaks and deep valleys of the North Cascades area.

== Gallery ==
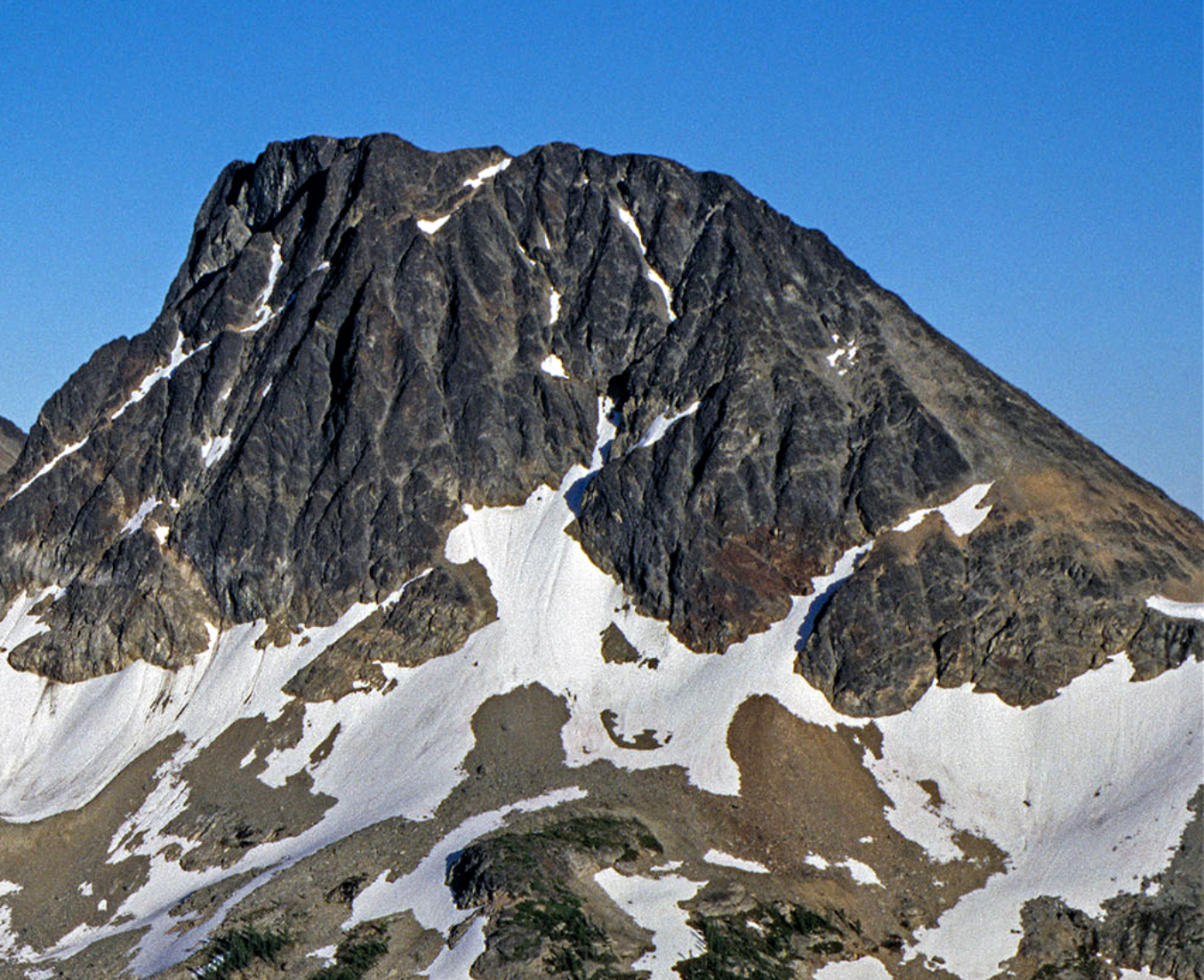
Mount Carru, north aspect

== See also ==
- List of Highest Mountain Peaks in Washington
- Geography of the North Cascades
- Geology of the Pacific Northwest
