= Hoodoo Peak =

Mountain in the North Cascades, Washington

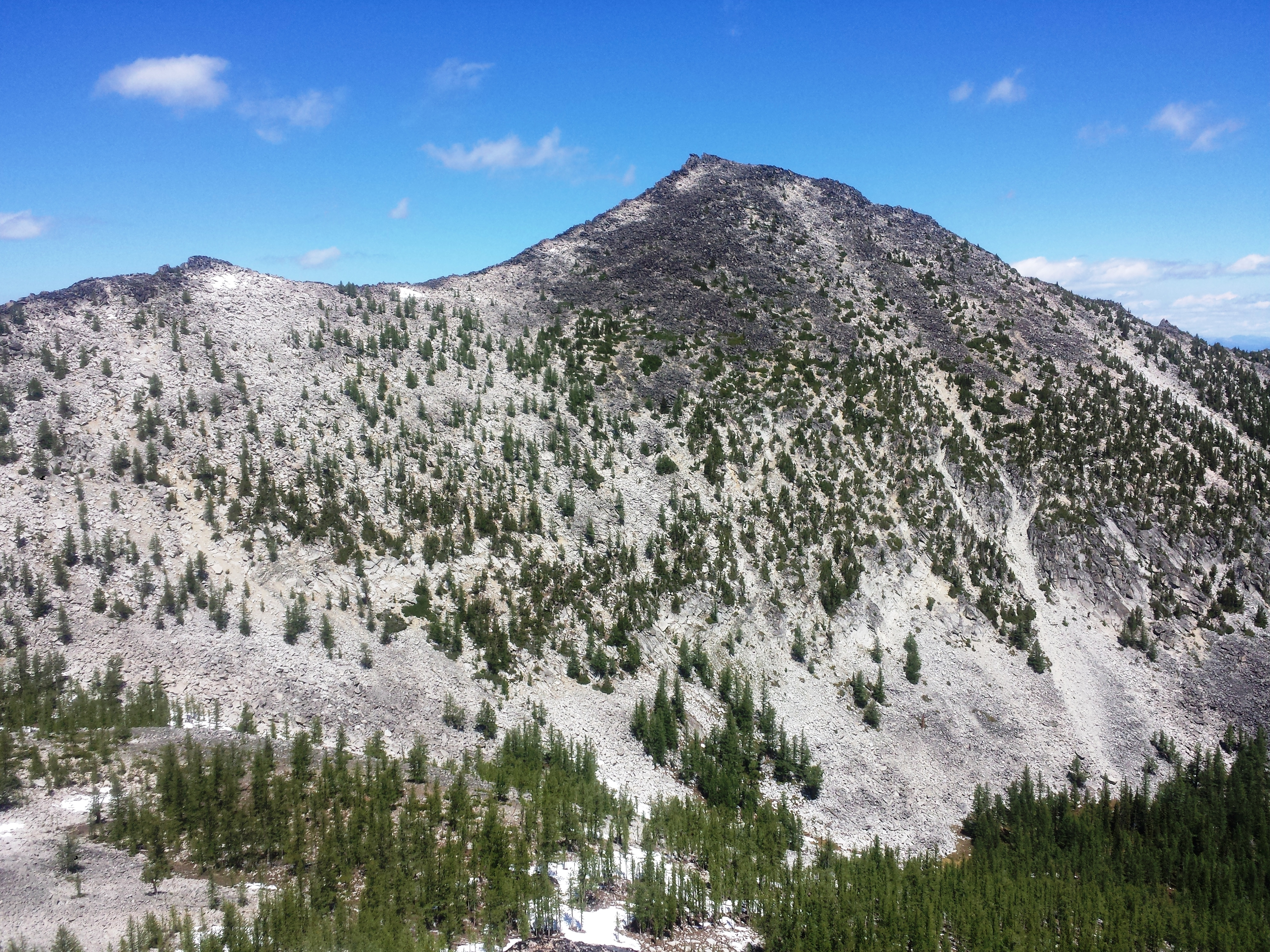
- Hoodoo Peak

Highest point
- Elevation: 8,475 ft (2,583 m)
- Prominence: 472 ft (144 m)
- Parent peak: Raven Ridge
- Isolation: 0.93 mi (1.50 km)
- Coordinates: 48°15′06″N 120°20′35″W

Naming
- Etymology: hoodoo

Geography
- Location within Washington (state) Location within the United States
- Interactive map of Hoodoo Peak
- Country: United States
- State: Washington
- County: Okanogan
- Protected area: Lake Chelan-Sawtooth Wilderness
- Parent range: Cascade Range; North Cascades; Methow Mountains
- Topo map: USGS Hoodoo Peak

Geology
- Rock age: Eocene to Late Cretaceous
- Rock type: Tonalitic Orthogneiss

Climbing
- Easiest route: Scrambling

Hoodoo Peak is a 8,475-foot (2,583-metre) mountain summit located in the Methow Mountains which are a sub-range of the North Cascades in Washington state. It is protected by the Lake Chelan-Sawtooth Wilderness within the Okanogan–Wenatchee National Forest. Hoodoo Peak ranks as the 71st-highest summit in the state. The nearest higher neighbor is Raven Ridge, 0.93 miles (1.50 km) to the south. Precipitation runoff on the west side of the mountain drains into Buttermilk Creek, whereas the east side of the mountain drains into Libby Creek.

== Climate ==
According to the Köppen climate classification system, Hoodoo Peak has an alpine climate. Lying east of the Cascade crest, the area around Hoodoo Peak is a bit drier than areas to the west. Summers can bring warm temperatures and occasional thunderstorms. With its impressive height, Hoodoo Peak can have snow on it in late-spring and early-fall, and it can be very cold in the winter.

== Geology ==
The North Cascades features some of the most rugged topography in the Cascade Range with craggy peaks, ridges, and deep glacial valleys. Geological events occurring many years ago created the diverse topography and drastic elevation changes over the Cascade Range leading to the various climate differences. These climate differences lead to vegetation variety defining the ecoregions in this area.

The history of the formation of the Cascade Mountains dates back millions of years ago to the late Eocene Epoch. With the North American Plate overriding the Pacific Plate, episodes of volcanic igneous activity persisted. In addition, small fragments of the oceanic and continental lithosphere called terranes created the North Cascades about 50 million years ago.

During the Pleistocene period dating back over two million years ago, glaciation advancing and retreating repeatedly scoured the landscape leaving deposits of rock debris. The U-shaped cross section of the river valleys is a result of recent glaciation. Uplift and faulting in combination with glaciation have been the dominant processes which have created the tall peaks and deep valleys of the North Cascades area.

== Gallery ==
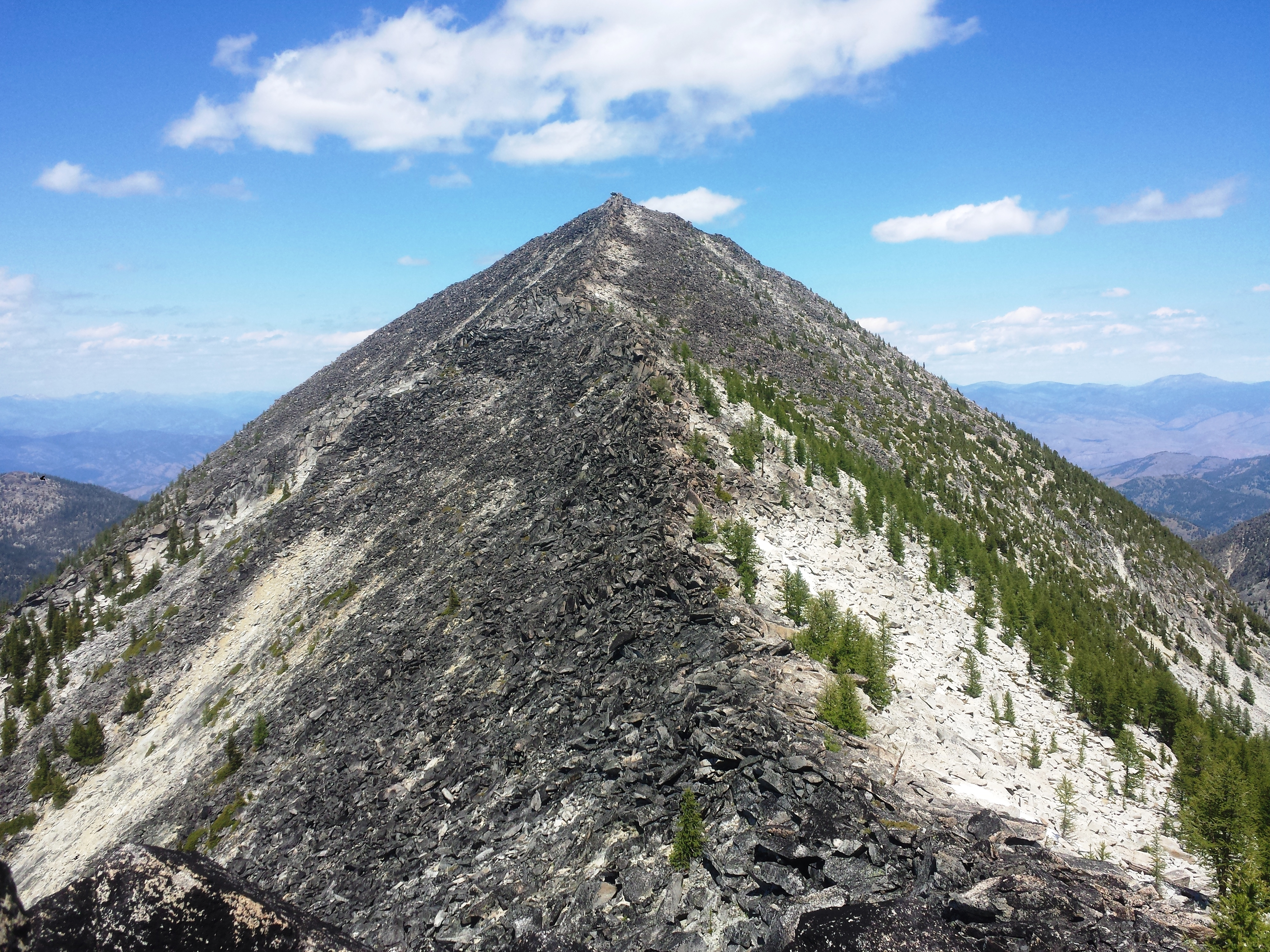
Hoodoo Peak approach

== See also ==
- List of Highest Mountain Peaks in Washington
- Geography of Washington (state)
- Geology of the Pacific Northwest
