= Raven Ridge (Washington) =

Mountain in the North Cascades, Washington

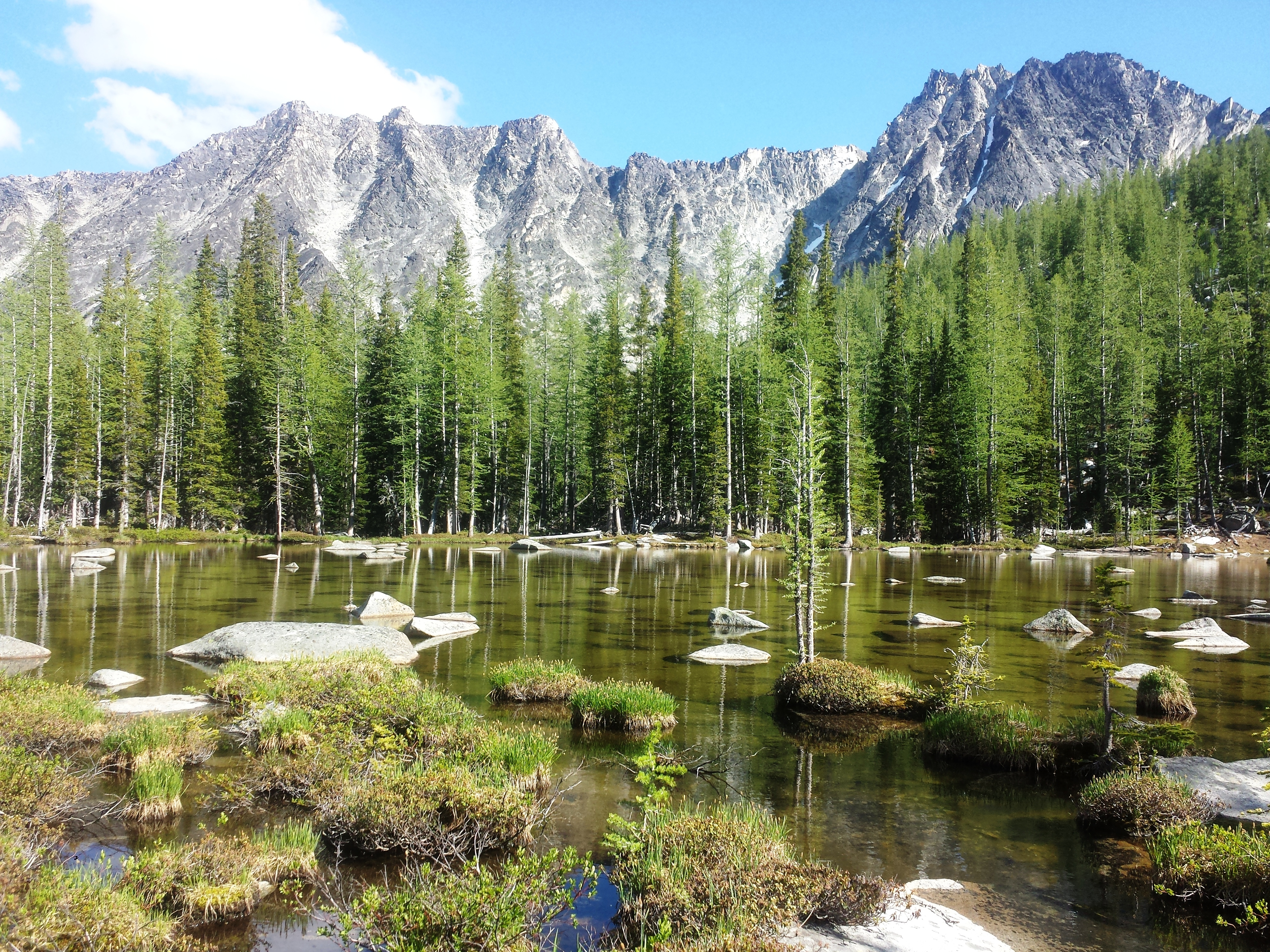
- Raven Ridge

Highest point
- Elevation: 8,572 ft (2,613 m)
- Prominence: 1,092 ft (333 m)
- Isolation: 4.53 mi (7.29 km)
- Coordinates: 48°14′16″N 120°19′55″W

Geography
- Location within Washington (state) Location within the United States
- Interactive map of Raven Ridge
- Location: Okanogan County, Washington, U.S.
- Parent range: North Cascades
- Topo map: USGS Martin Peak

Climbing
- Easiest route: Scrambling

Raven Ridge is a 8,572-foot (2,613-metre) mountain ridge located in the Methow Mountains, a sub-range of the North Cascades in Washington state. It is protected by the Lake Chelan-Sawtooth Wilderness within the Okanogan–Wenatchee National Forest. The highest point of Raven Ridge is Corax Peak on the east end. Libby Peak (8555 ft) is the high point on the west end of Raven Ridge. The nearest higher peak is Star Peak, 4.53 miles (7.29 km) to the west. Hoodoo Peak lies one mile to the north. Precipitation runoff from the mountain drains into tributaries of the Methow River, which is a tributary of the Columbia River.

== Climate ==
Lying east of the Cascade crest, the area around Raven Ridge is a bit drier than areas to the west. Summers can bring warm temperatures and occasional thunderstorms. With its impressive height, it can have snow on it in late-spring and early-fall and can be very cold in the winter.

== Geology ==
The North Cascades features some of the most rugged topography in the Cascade Range with craggy peaks, ridges, and deep glacial valleys. Geological events occurring many years ago created the diverse topography and drastic elevation changes over the Cascade Range leading to the various climate differences. These climate differences lead to vegetation variety defining the ecoregions in this area.

The history of the formation of the Cascade Mountains dates back millions of years ago to the late Eocene Epoch. With the North American Plate overriding the Pacific Plate, episodes of volcanic igneous activity persisted. In addition, small fragments of the oceanic and continental lithosphere called terranes created the North Cascades about 50 million years ago.

During the Pleistocene period dating back over two million years ago, glaciation advancing and retreating repeatedly scoured the landscape leaving deposits of rock debris. The U-shaped cross section of the river valleys is a result of recent glaciation. Uplift and faulting in combination with glaciation have been the dominant processes which have created the tall peaks and deep valleys of the North Cascades area.

== Gallery ==
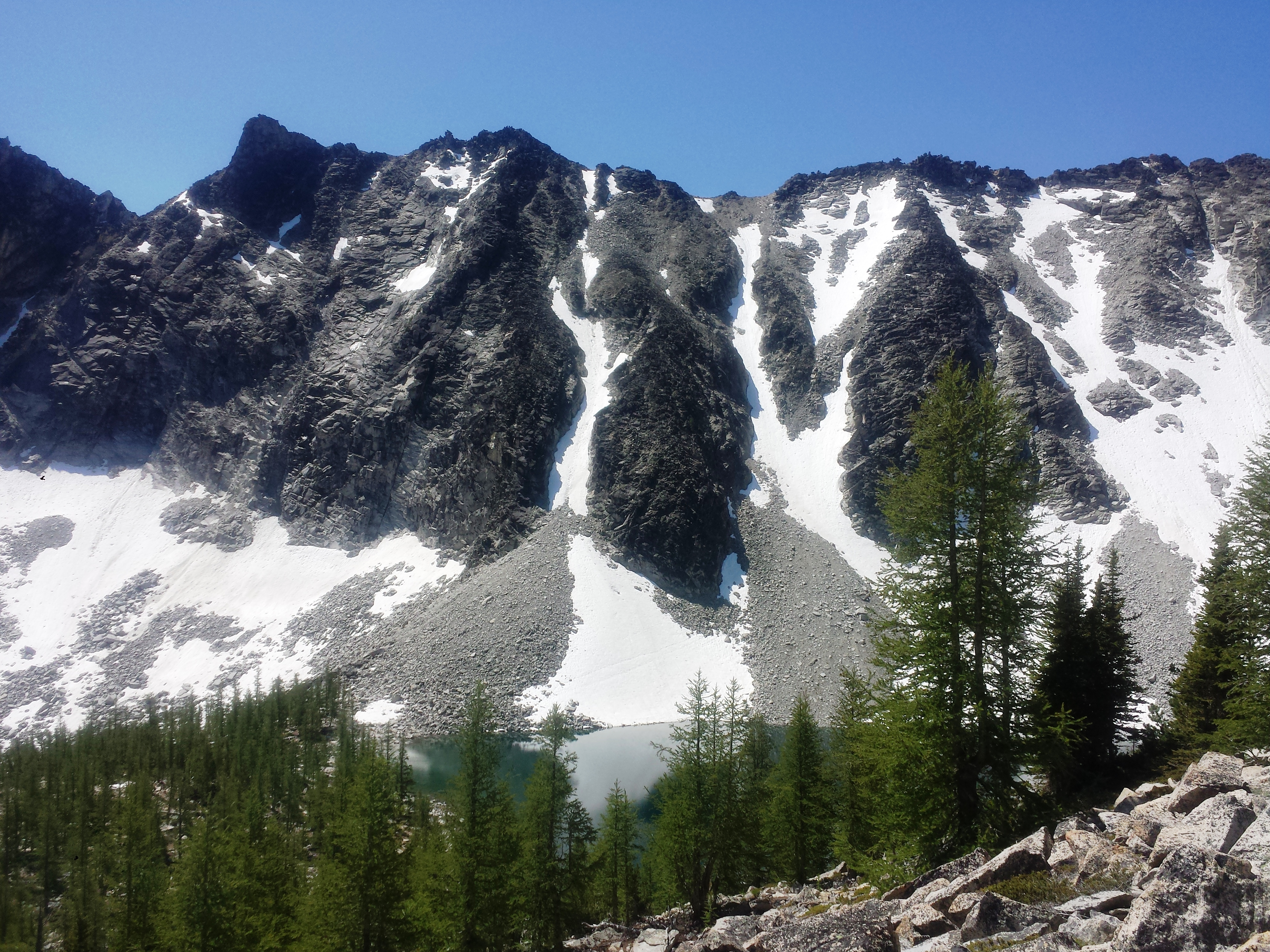
Raven Ridge above Libby Lake

== See also ==
- List of highest mountain peaks in Washington Raven Ridge ranks #36
