= Osceola Peak =

Mountain in Washington (state), United States

- Location within Washington (state) Location within the United States
- Interactive map of Osceola Peak

Highest point
- Elevation: 8,587 ft (2,617 m)
- Prominence: 1,147 ft (350 m)
- Listing: List of Highest Mountain Peaks in Washington 35th
- Coordinates: 48°49′51″N 120°34′36″W

Geography
- Location: Pasayten Wilderness; Okanogan County; Washington, U.S.
- Parent range: Okanogan Range; North Cascades; Cascade Range
- Topo map: USGS Mount Lago

Climbing
- First ascent: 1933 by Hermann Ulrichs and Richard Alt
- Easiest route: class 2 Scrambling south slope

Osceola Peak is an 8,587-foot (2,617-metre) mountain summit located in western Okanogan County in Washington state. The mountain's name was officially adopted in 1972. Osceola is the 10th highest peak of the Okanogan Range, which is a sub-range of the North Cascades. Osceola Peak ranks 50th on Washington's highest 100 peaks, and 48th on the "Bulger List". The mountain is situated in the Pasayten Wilderness, on land managed by the Okanogan–Wenatchee National Forest. The nearest higher peak is Mount Carru, 1 mile (1.6 km) to the east. The mountain has a steep north face, but the south slope is covered in scree which allows a nontechnical climbing ascent. Precipitation runoff from Osceola Peak drains north into tributaries of the Similkameen River, or south into Eureka Creek, which is part of the Methow River drainage basin.

== Climate ==
Most weather fronts originate in the Pacific Ocean, and travel northeast toward the Cascade Mountains. As fronts approach the North Cascades, they are forced upward by the peaks of the Cascade Range, causing them to drop their moisture in the form of rain or snowfall onto the Cascades (Orographic lift). As a result, the west side of the North Cascades experiences high precipitation, especially during the winter months in the form of snowfall. During winter months, weather is usually cloudy, but, due to high pressure systems over the Pacific Ocean that intensify during summer months, there is often little or no cloud cover during the summer.

== Geology ==
The North Cascades features some of the most rugged topography in the Cascade Range with craggy peaks, spires, ridges, and deep glacial valleys. Geological events occurring many years ago created diverse topography and drastic elevation changes over the Cascade Range leading to various climate differences.

The history of the formation of the Cascade Mountains dates back millions of years ago to the late Eocene Epoch. With the North American Plate overriding the Pacific Plate, episodes of volcanic igneous activity persisted. In addition, small fragments of the oceanic and continental lithosphere called terranes created the North Cascades about 50 million years ago.

During the Pleistocene period dating back over two million years ago, glaciation advancing and retreating repeatedly scoured the landscape leaving deposits of rock debris. The U-shaped cross section of the river valleys is a result of recent glaciation. Uplift and faulting in combination with glaciation has been the dominant processes that have created the tall peaks and deep valleys of the North Cascades area.

== See also ==
- Geography of the North Cascades
- Geology of the Pacific Northwest
