= 2012 Washington wildfires =

Wildfire season in Washington, United States

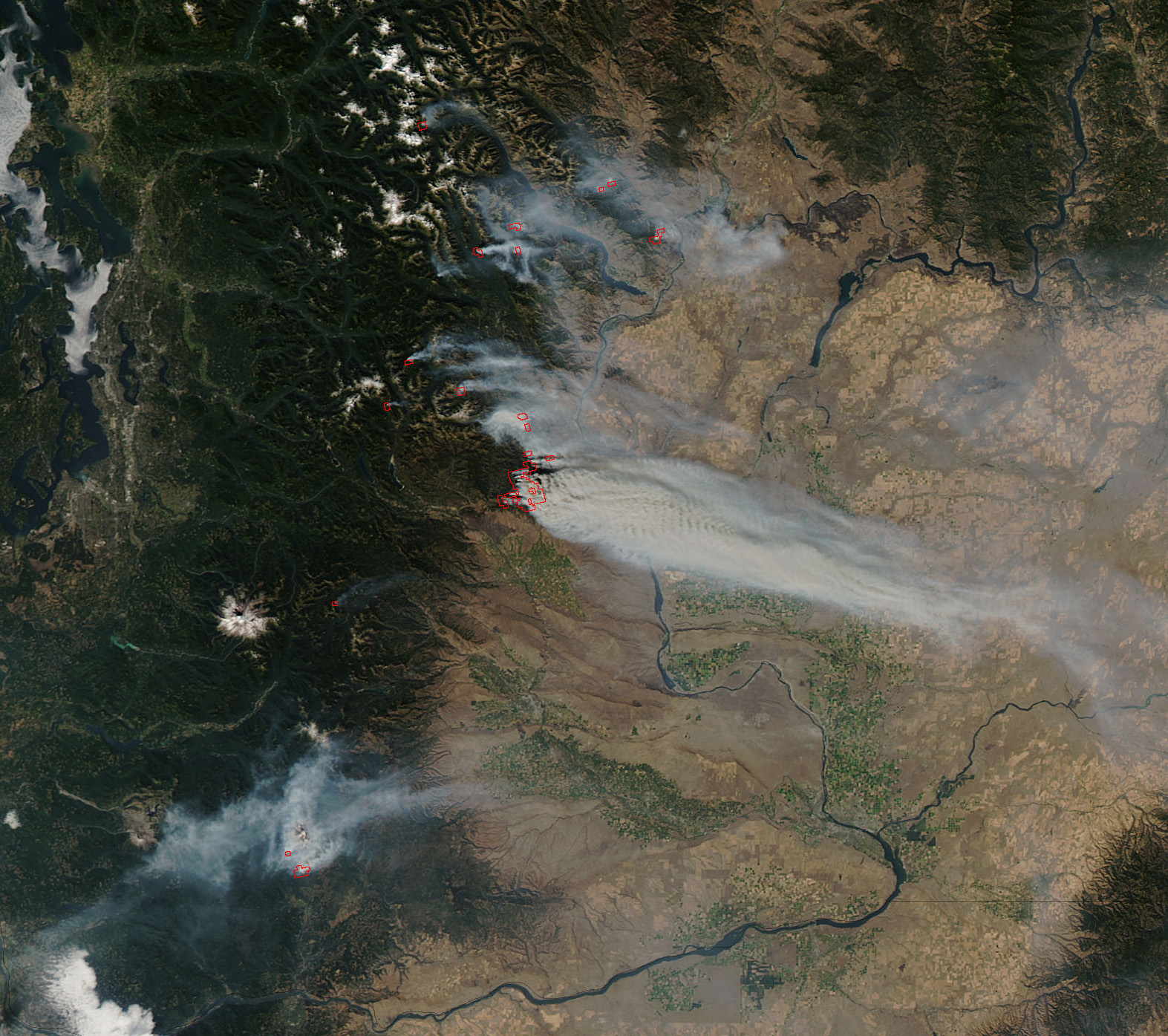
- Satellite image of fires on September 19

Statistics
- Total fires: 1,342
- Total area: 259,526 acres (1,050 km^{2})

The 2012 Washington wildfires were a series of 1,342 wildfires that burned 259,526 acres (1,050 km^{2}) over the course of 2012. The fires primarily occurred in the Okanogan and Wenatchee National Forests during September and October 2012. A severe lightning storm on September 8 caused hundreds of fires across the east side of Cascade Range. Smoke caused hazardous air quality conditions in the cities of Ellensburg and Wenatchee, and was noticeable in Seattle. The cost of fighting the largest four fires was estimated to be $67.5 million.

== Taylor Bridge Fire ==
The first major wildfire in Washington during the 2012 season started on August 13 east of Cle Elum between Interstate 90 and U.S. Route 97 in Kittitas County. The fire was fully contained on August 28 after burning 23,500 acres (36.7 sq mi; 95.1 km^{2}) acres and destroying 61 homes. The cause of the fire is under investigation, but is suspected to be construction work.

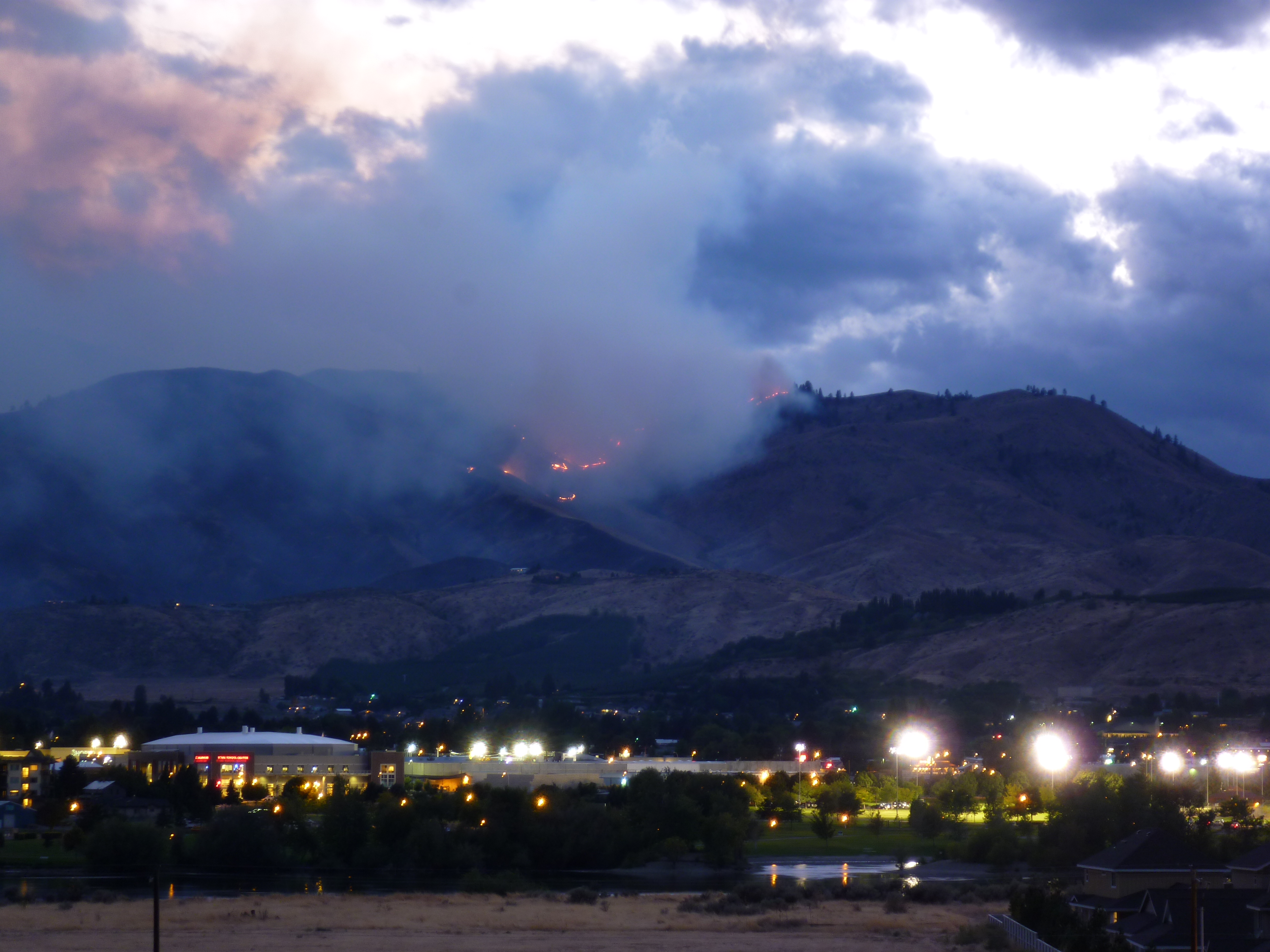
Canyon Fire part of Wenatchee Complex Fire 2012, above the city of Wenatchee Washington

== September 8 lightning-strike fires ==
- Okanogan Complex – 6,169 acres (9.639 sq mi; 24.97 km^{2}). Three fires in the lower Methow River valley, on either side of State Route 153 in Okanogan County.
- Wenatchee Complex – 56,291 acres (87.95 sq mi; 227.8 km^{2}). The largest fires were south of U.S. Route 2 near the city of Wenatchee mainly in Chelan County. Other fires in the complex were in the upper Entiat and Wenatchee River drainages.
  - Byrd Fire – 14,119 acres (22.06 sq mi; 57.14 km^{2})
  - Canyon Fire – 7,557 acres (11.81 sq mi; 30.58 km^{2}). Located less than a mile west of the city of Wenatchee in Number 1 and Number 2 canyons.
  - Cashmere Fire – 2,651 acres (4.142 sq mi; 10.73 km^{2}). Located south of Icicle Creek extending into the Alpine Lakes Wilderness.
  - Peavine Canyon Fire – 19,467 acres (30.42 sq mi; 78.78 km^{2}). The Peavine Canyon Fire grew to become contiguous with the Table Mountain Fire to the south.
  - Poison Canyon Fire – 5,910 acres (9.234 sq mi; 23.92 km^{2})
- Table Mountain Fire – 42,312 acres (66.11 sq mi; 171.2 km^{2}). Located east of U.S. Route 97 near Blewett Pass in Kittitas County, the Table Mountain Fire threatened homes and historic structures near Liberty, Washington. The fire grew to become contiguous with the Peavine Canyon Fire to the north.
- Yakima Complex – 2,300 acres (3.6 sq mi; 9.3 km^{2}). Approximately 75 small fires in Kittitas and Yakima counties. The Wild Rose Fire was the largest and is located north of U.S. Route 12 and east of Rimrock Lake.
- Cascade Creek Fire – 20,038 acres (31.31 sq mi; 81.09 km^{2}). Located on the south and west slopes of Mount Adams in the Gifford Pinchot National Forest, including part of the Mount Adams Wilderness. Skamania and Yakima counties.

== Other fires ==
- Goat Fire – 7,378 acres (11.53 sq mi; 29.86 km^{2}). Human-caused fire began on September 16, located south of State Route 153 and west of U.S. Route 97 in Okanogan County.
