= Whistler Mountain (Washington) =

Mountain in Washington (state), United States

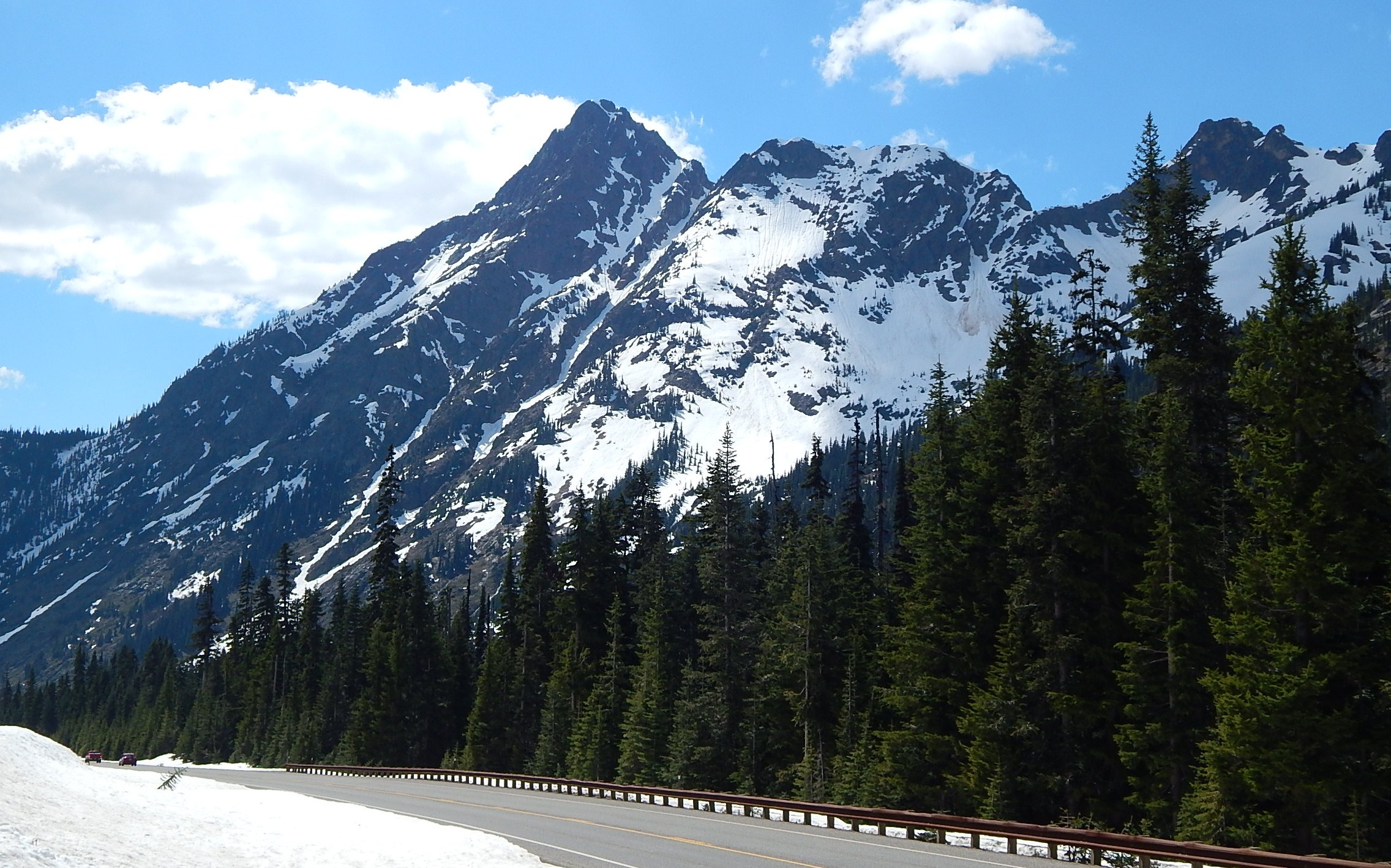
- Whistler Mountain from North Cascades Highway

Highest point
- Elevation: 7,790 ft (2,374 m)
- Prominence: 590 ft (180 m)
- Parent peak: Cutthroat Peak (8,050 ft)
- Isolation: 0.78 mi (1.26 km)
- Coordinates: 48°30′56″N 120°42′28″W

Geography
- Location within Washington (state) Location within the United States
- Interactive map of Whistler Mountain
- Country: United States
- State: Washington
- County: Chelan
- Protected area: Okanogan–Wenatchee National Forest
- Parent range: Okanagan Range; North Cascades; Cascade Range
- Topo map: USGS Washington Pass

Geology
- Rock age: Late Cretaceous
- Rock type: Tonalitic pluton

Climbing
- Easiest route: class 3 scrambling

Whistler Mountain is a 7,790-foot (2,370-metre) mountain summit located in Chelan County of Washington state. The mountain is part of the Okanagan Range which is a sub-range of the North Cascades. Whistler Mountain is about two miles west of Washington Pass and one mile east of Rainy Pass. The North Cascades Highway bends around the southern base of the mountain between these two passes. A high ridge connects Whistler to its nearest higher neighbor, Cutthroat Peak, which is 0.78 miles (1.26 km) to the north-northeast. Precipitation runoff from the peak drains into Bridge Creek. Topographic relief is significant as the summit rises over 3,000 feet (910 meters) above the creek and highway in approximately one mile.

== Climate ==
Whistler Mountain is located in the marine west coast climate zone of western North America. Weather fronts originating in the Pacific Ocean travel northeast toward the Cascade Mountains. As fronts approach the North Cascades, they are forced upward by the peaks of the Cascade Range (orographic lift), causing them to drop their moisture in the form of rain or snowfall onto the Cascades. As a result, the west side of the North Cascades experiences high precipitation, especially during the winter months in the form of snowfall. Because of maritime influence, snow tends to be wet and heavy, resulting in high avalanche danger. During winter months, weather is usually cloudy, but due to high pressure systems over the Pacific Ocean that intensify during summer months, there is often little or no cloud cover during the summer.

== Geology ==
The North Cascades features some of the most rugged topography in the Cascade Range with craggy peaks, ridges, and deep glacial valleys. Geological events occurring many years ago created the diverse topography and drastic elevation changes over the Cascade Range leading to the various climate differences.

The history of the formation of the Cascade Mountains dates back millions of years ago to the late Eocene Epoch. With the North American Plate overriding the Pacific Plate, episodes of volcanic igneous activity persisted. In addition, small fragments of the oceanic and continental lithosphere called terranes created the North Cascades about 50 million years ago.

During the Pleistocene period dating back over two million years ago, glaciation advancing and retreating repeatedly scoured the landscape leaving deposits of rock debris. The U-shaped cross section of the river valleys is a result of recent glaciation. Uplift and faulting in combination with glaciation have been the dominant processes which have created the tall peaks and deep valleys of the North Cascades area.

== Gallery ==
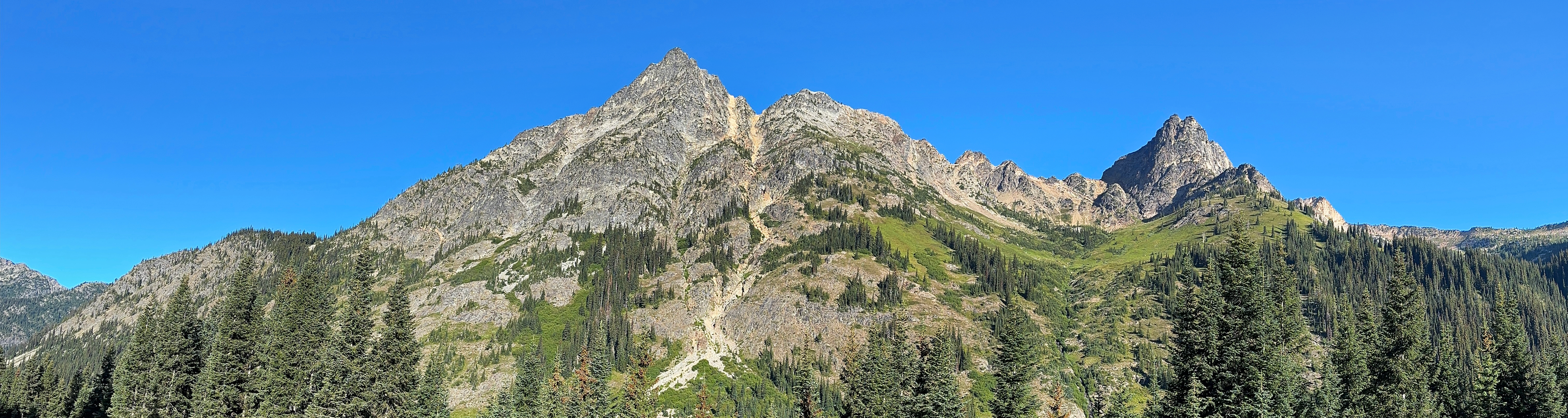
Whistler Mountain centered. Cutthroat Peak to right.

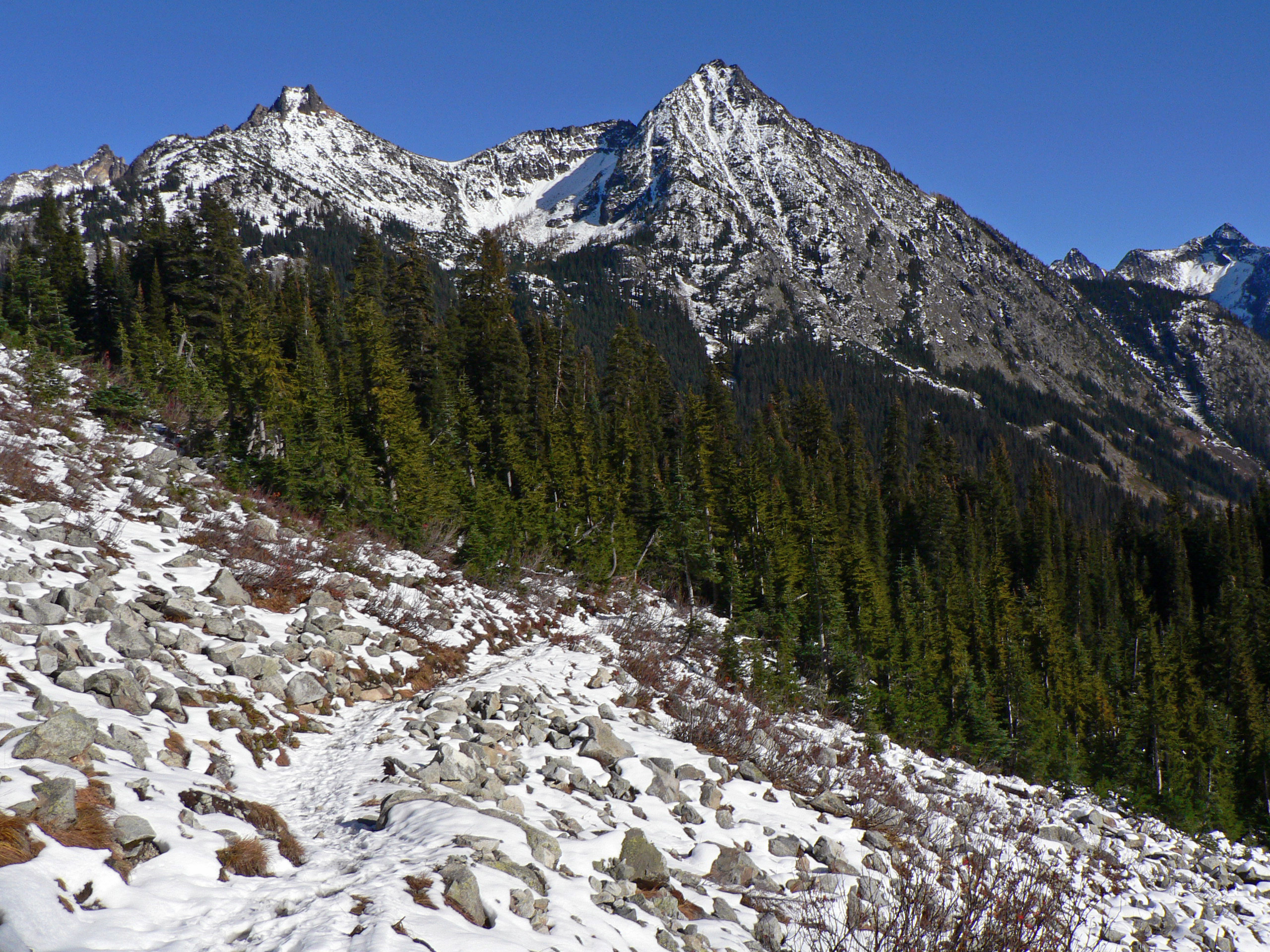
Whistler from Maple Pass Trail

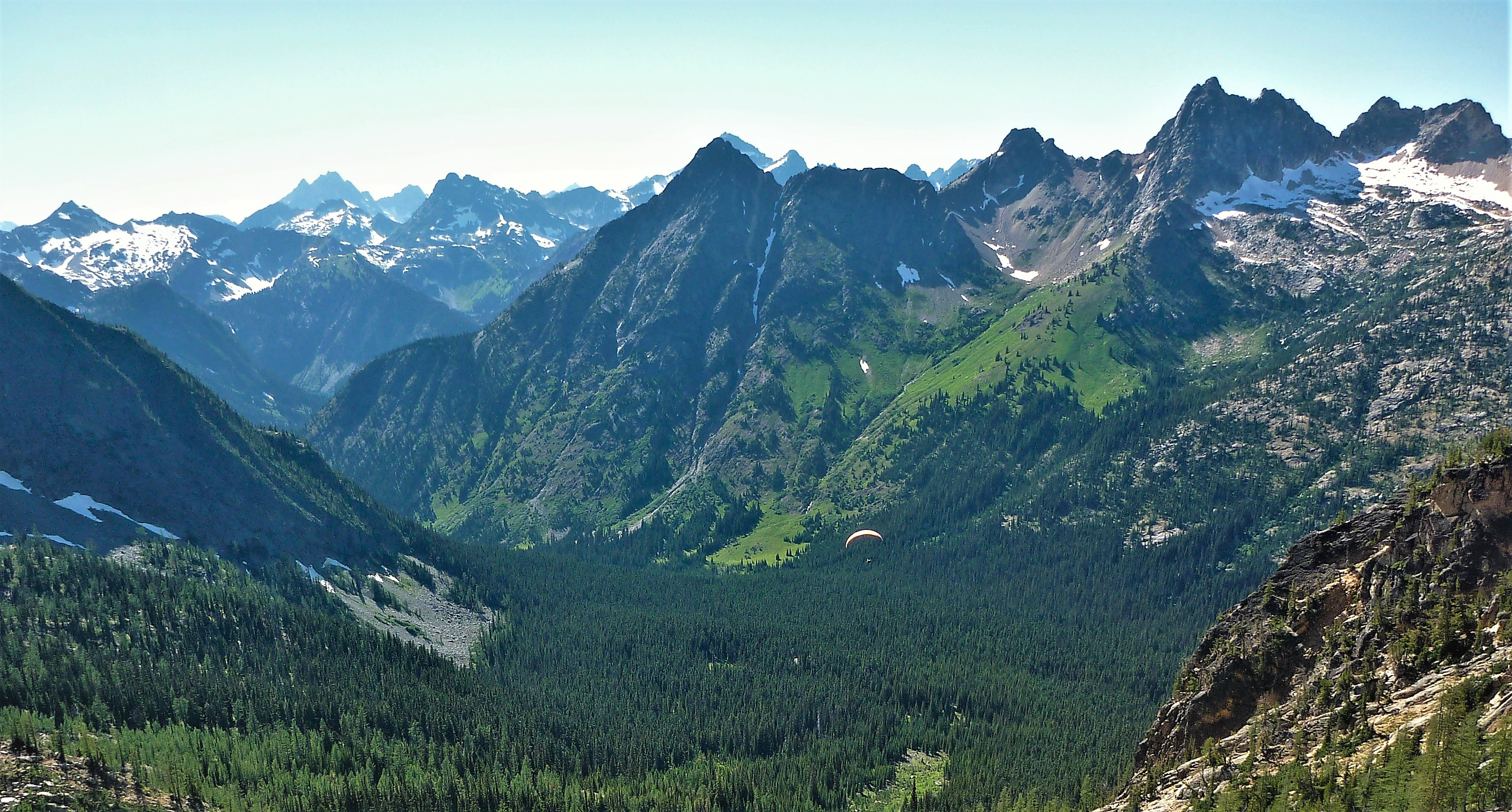
Whistler Mountain centered. Cutthroat Peak in upper right.

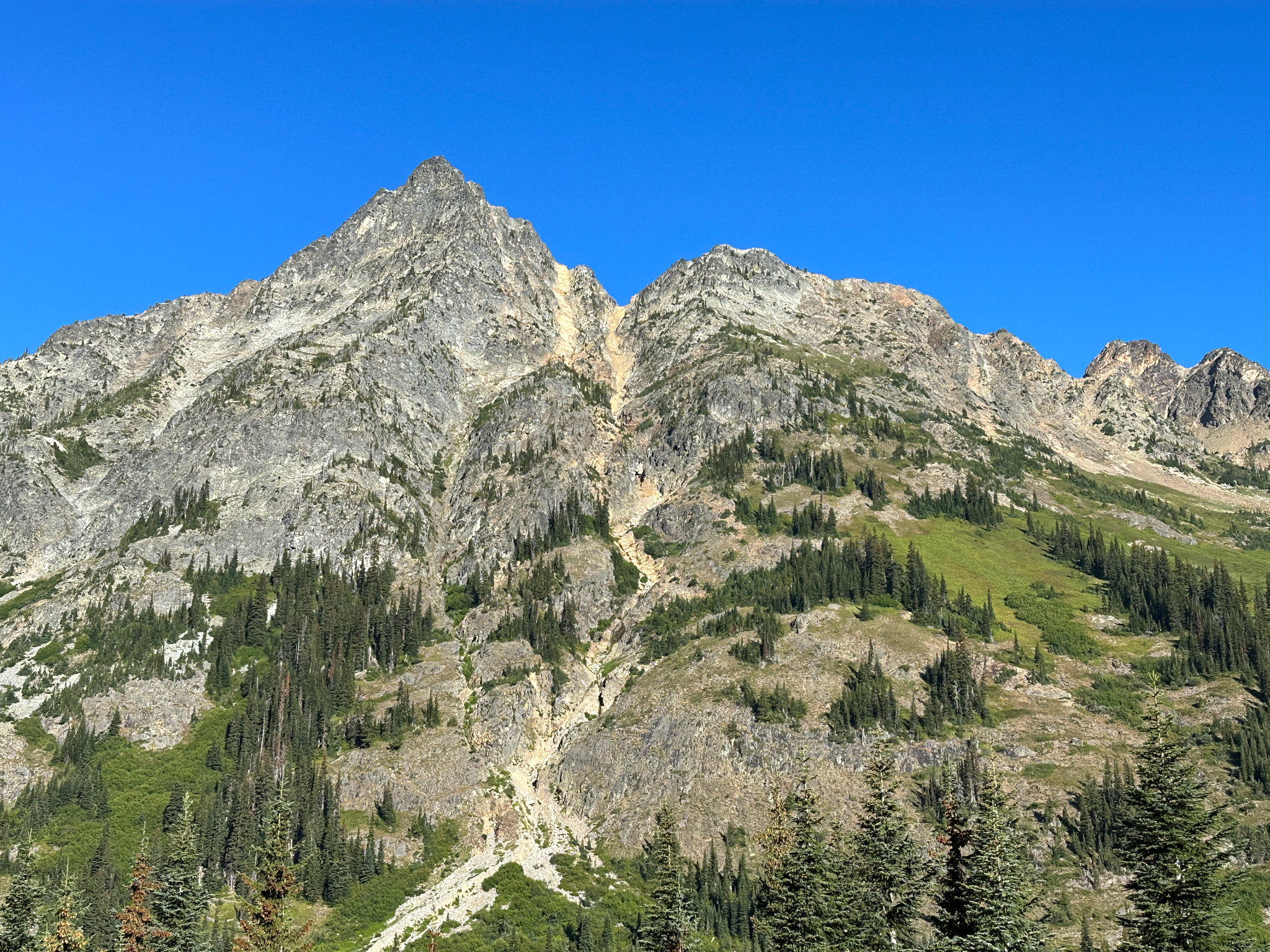
