= Crooked Bum =

Mountain in Washington (state), United States

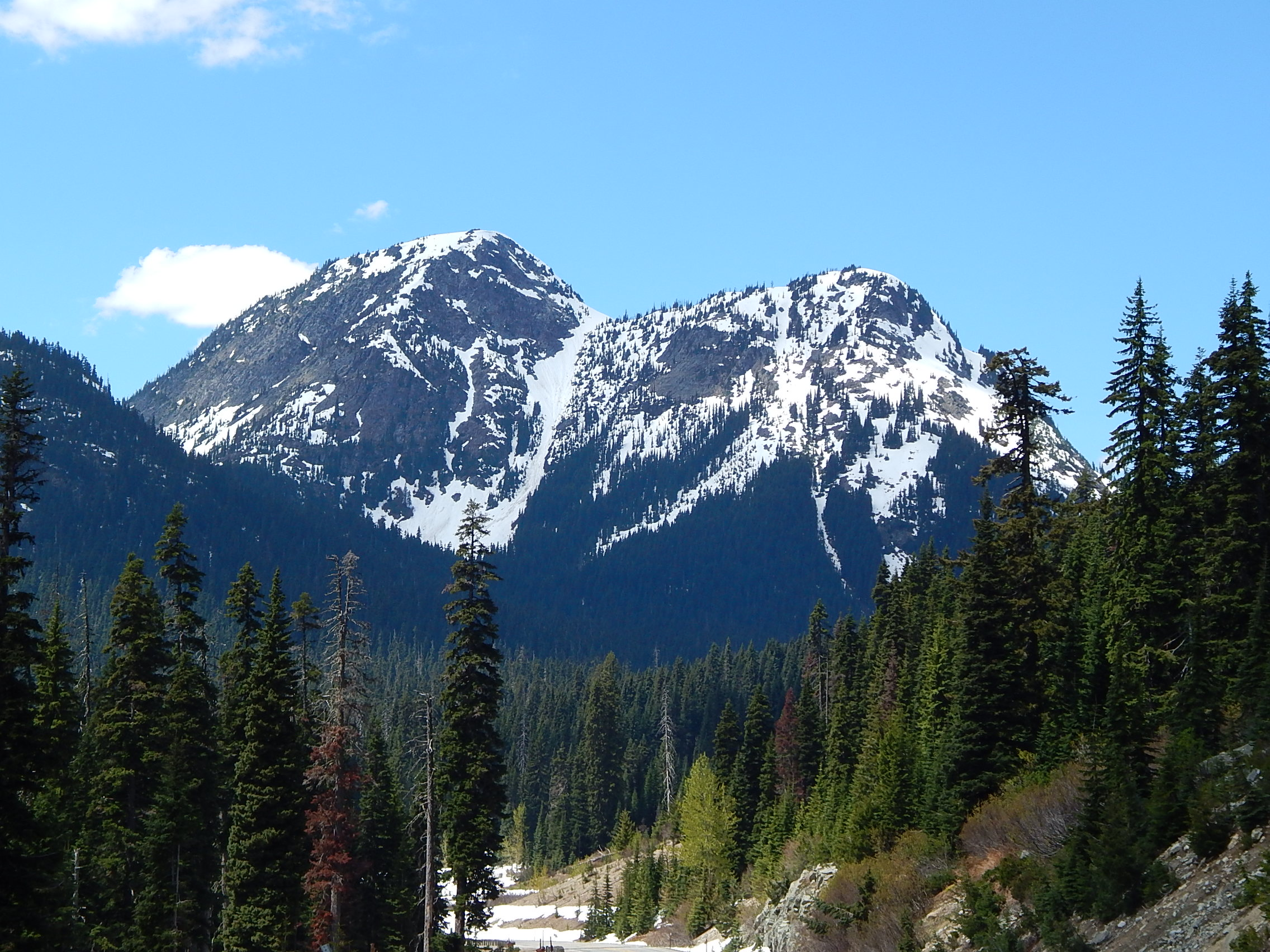
- Crooked Bum seen from westbound North Cascades Highway

Highest point
- Elevation: 6,937 ft (2,114 m)
- Prominence: 857 ft (260 m)
- Parent peak: Frisco Mountain (7,780 ft)
- Isolation: 1.72 mi (2.77 km)
- Coordinates: 48°30′49″N 120°45′08″W

Geography
- Location within Washington (state) Location within the United States
- Interactive map of Crooked Bum
- Location: Skagit County, Washington; United States
- Parent range: North Cascades
- Topo map: USGS Mount Arriva

Climbing
- Easiest route: Scrambling

Crooked Bum is a 6,937-foot-elevation (2,114-meter) mountain summit on the crest of the North Cascades in the U.S. state of Washington. It is located in the Okanogan–Wenatchee National Forest on the shared border of Skagit County and Chelan County. It is situated immediately west of Rainy Pass and two miles east of Corteo Peak. The scenic and popular Maple Pass Trail traverses the south slope of the peak while staying above Lake Ann. Precipitation runoff from the north slope of Crooked Bum drains into Granite Creek which is a tributary of the Skagit River, whereas the south side drains into Bridge Creek which is a tributary of the Chelan River.

== Climate ==
Most weather fronts originate in the Pacific Ocean, and travel northeast toward the Cascade Mountains. As fronts approach the North Cascades, they are forced upward by the peaks of the Cascade Range (Orographic lift), causing them to drop their moisture in the form of rain or snowfall onto the Cascades. As a result, the west side of the North Cascades experiences high precipitation, especially during the winter months in the form of snowfall. During winter months, weather is usually cloudy, but, due to high pressure systems over the Pacific Ocean that intensify during summer months, there is often little or no cloud cover during the summer. Because of maritime influence, snow tends to be wet and heavy, resulting in high avalanche danger.

== Geology ==
The North Cascades features some of the most rugged topography in the Cascade Range with craggy peaks and ridges and deep glacial valleys. Geological events occurring many years ago created the diverse topography and drastic elevation changes over the Cascade Range leading to the various climate differences. These climate differences lead to vegetation variety defining the ecoregions in this area.

The history of the formation of the Cascade Mountains dates back millions of years ago to the late Eocene Epoch. With the North American Plate overriding the Pacific Plate, episodes of volcanic igneous activity persisted. In addition, small fragments of the oceanic and continental lithosphere called terranes created the North Cascades about 50 million years ago.

During the Pleistocene period dating back over two million years ago, glaciation advancing and retreating repeatedly scoured the landscape leaving deposits of rock debris. The U-shaped cross section of the river valleys is a result of recent glaciation. Uplift and faulting in combination with glaciation have been the dominant processes which have created the tall peaks and deep valleys of the North Cascades area.

== Gallery ==
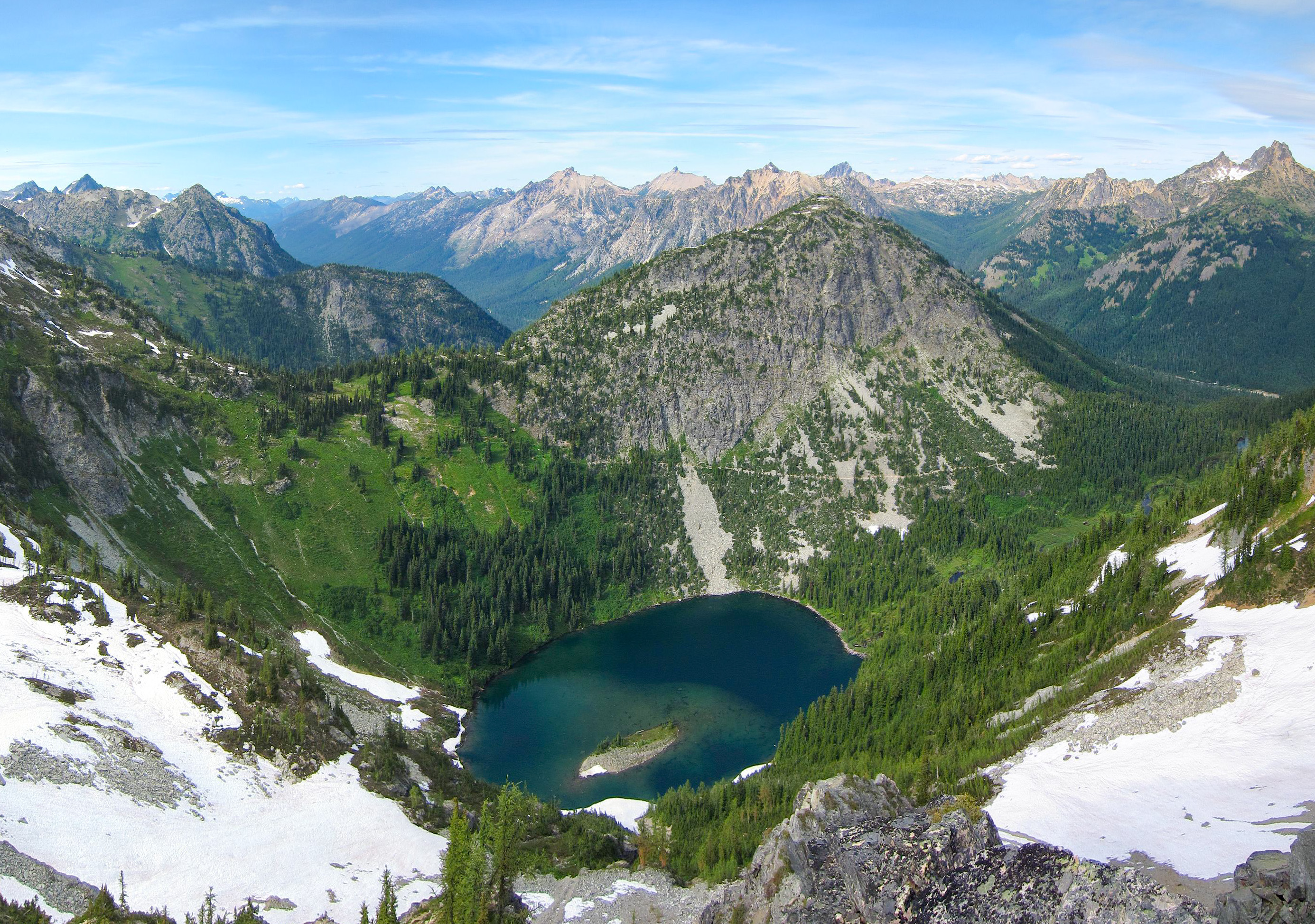
Crooked Bum seen from Maple Pass on opposite side of Lake Ann

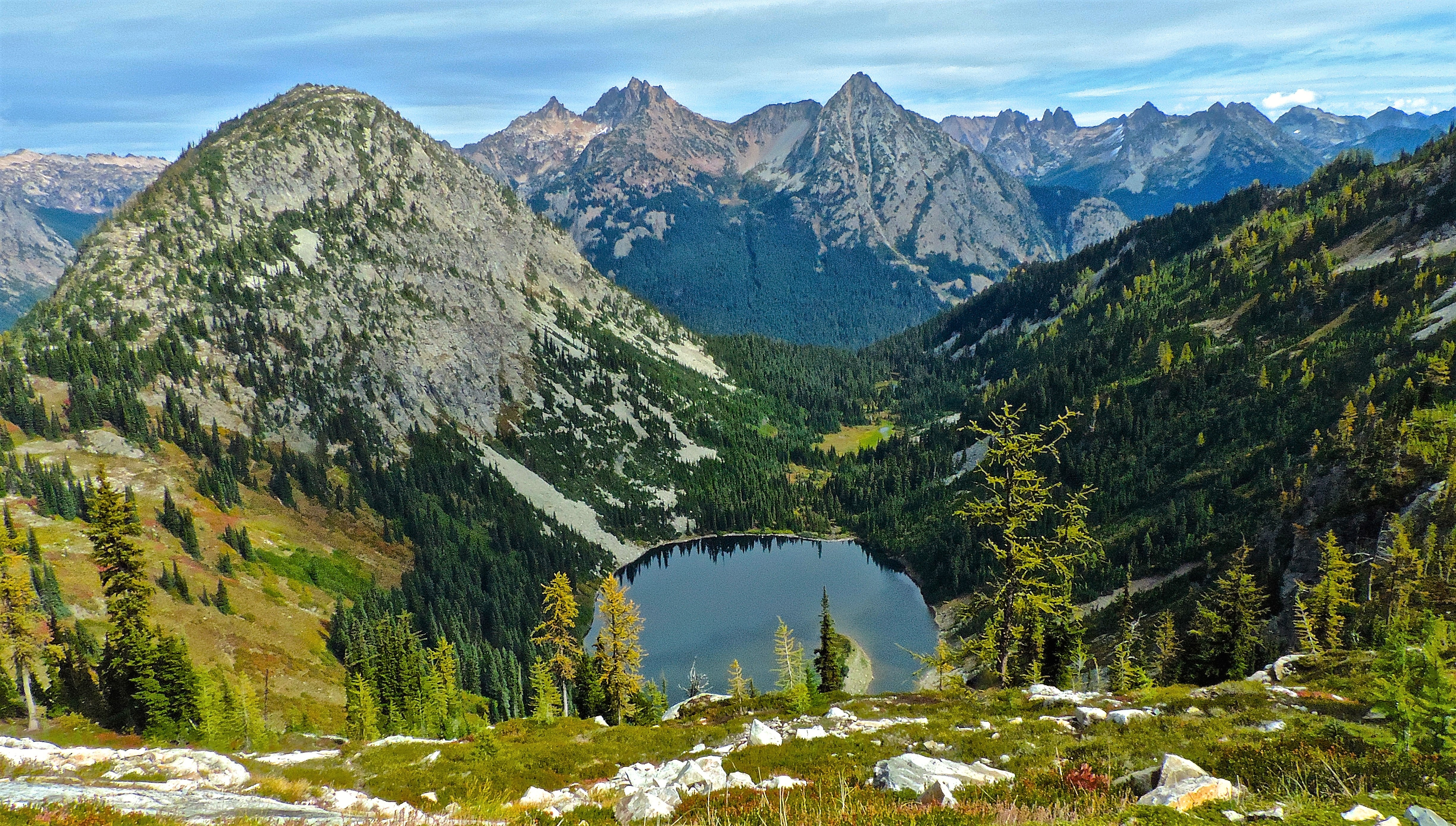
Crooked Bum (left) with Lake Ann

== See also ==
- Geography of the North Cascades
