= Cutthroat Peak =

Mountain in Washington (state), United States

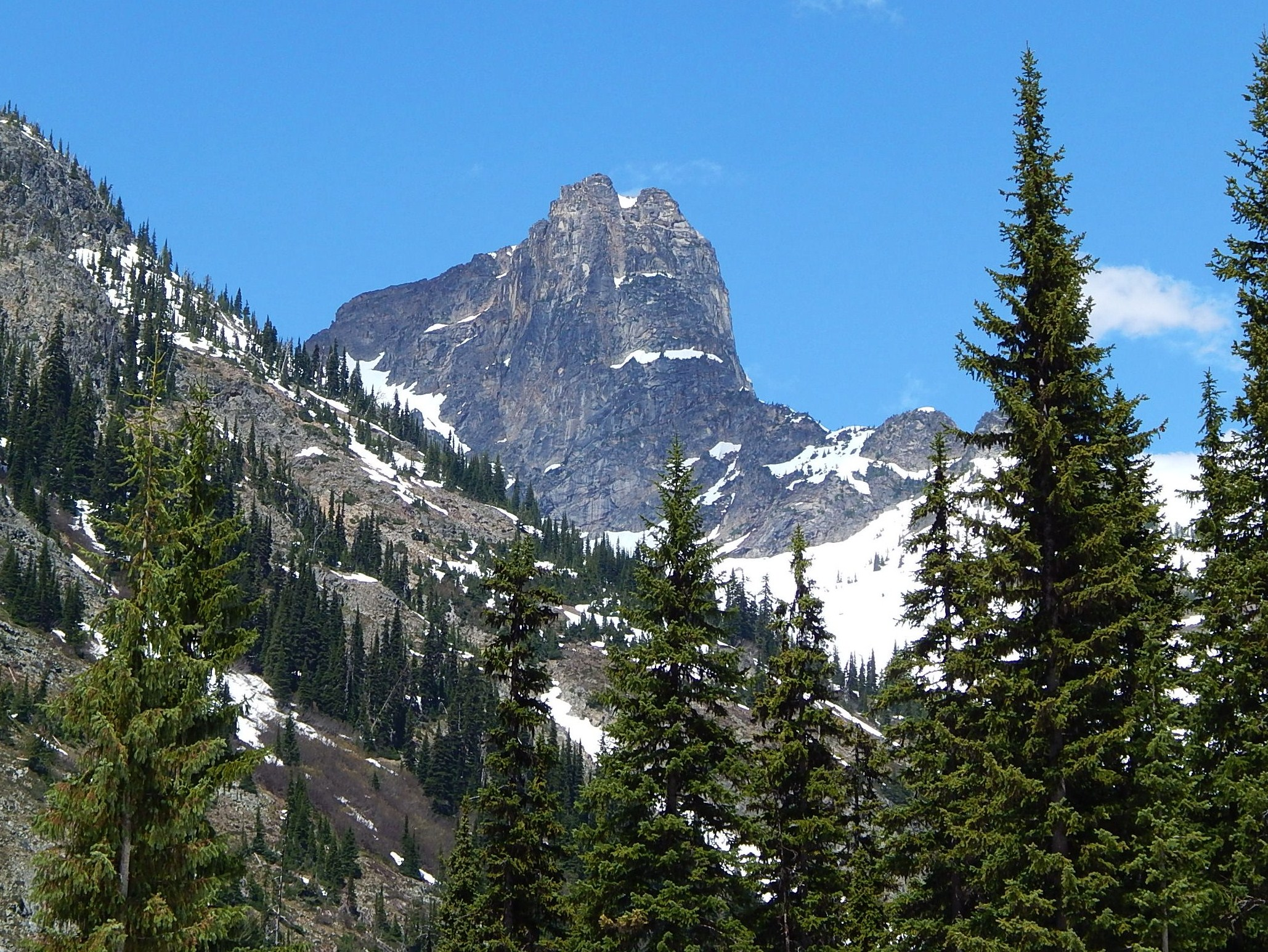
- South aspect

Highest point
- Elevation: 8,066 ft (2,459 m)
- Prominence: 1,766 ft (538 m)
- Parent peak: Tower Mountain (8,444 ft)
- Isolation: 3.84 mi (6.18 km)
- Coordinates: 48°31′35″N 120°42′13″W

Naming
- Etymology: Cutthroat

Geography
- Location within Washington (state) Location within the United States
- Interactive map of Cutthroat Peak
- Country: United States
- State: Washington
- County: Skagit / Chelan
- Protected area: Okanogan–Wenatchee National Forest
- Parent range: Okanagan Range; North Cascades; Cascade Range
- Topo map: USGS Washington Pass

Geology
- Rock type: Granite

Climbing
- First ascent: July 22, 1937 by Kenneth Adam, Raffi Bedayn
- Easiest route: class 4 climbing

Cutthroat Peak is an 8,066-foot-elevation (2,459-meter) granitic mountain located on the boundary of Chelan County and Skagit County, in Washington state. The mountain is part of the Okanagan Range which is a subrange of the Cascade Range, and it is situated within the Okanogan–Wenatchee National Forest. Cutthroat Peak is set about two miles west of Washington Pass and one mile east of Rainy Pass. It is a prominent landmark along the North Cascades Highway with an accessible climbing route (South Buttress class 5.8). Topographic relief is significant as the summit rises over 3,000 feet (910 meters) above State Creek in one mile (1.6 km). There is also a Cutthroat Lake, Cutthroat Creek, and Cutthroat Pass on its north and east aspects. This landform's toponym was officially adopted in 1988 by the United States Board on Geographic Names. Molar Tooth is a granite pillar half a mile north on the ridge extending to Cutthroat Pass.

== Climate ==
Cutthroat Peak is located in the marine west coast climate zone of western North America. Most weather fronts originating in the Pacific Ocean travel northeast toward the Cascade Mountains. As fronts approach the North Cascades, they are forced upward by the peaks of the Cascade Range (orographic lift), causing them to drop their moisture in the form of rain or snowfall onto the Cascades. As a result, the west side of the North Cascades experiences high precipitation, especially during the winter months in the form of snowfall. Because of maritime influence, snow tends to be wet and heavy, resulting in high avalanche danger. During winter months weather is usually cloudy, but due to high pressure systems over the Pacific Ocean that intensify during summer months, there is often little or no cloud cover during the summer. Due to its temperate climate and proximity to the Pacific Ocean, areas west of the Cascade Crest very rarely experience temperatures below 0 °F (−18 °C) or above 80 °F (27 °C).

== Geology ==
The North Cascades features some of the most rugged topography in the Cascade Range with craggy peaks, ridges, and deep glacial valleys. Geological events occurring many years ago created the diverse topography and drastic elevation changes over the Cascade Range leading to the various climate differences. These climate differences lead to vegetation variety defining the ecoregions in this area.

The history of the formation of the Cascade Mountains dates back millions of years ago to the late Eocene Epoch. With the North American Plate overriding the Pacific Plate, episodes of volcanic igneous activity persisted. In addition, small fragments of the oceanic and continental lithosphere called terranes created the North Cascades about 50 million years ago.

During the Pleistocene period dating back over two million years ago, glaciation advancing and retreating repeatedly scoured the landscape leaving deposits of rock debris. The U-shaped cross section of the river valleys is a result of recent glaciation. Uplift and faulting in combination with glaciation have been the dominant processes which have created the tall peaks and deep valleys of the North Cascades area.

== Gallery ==
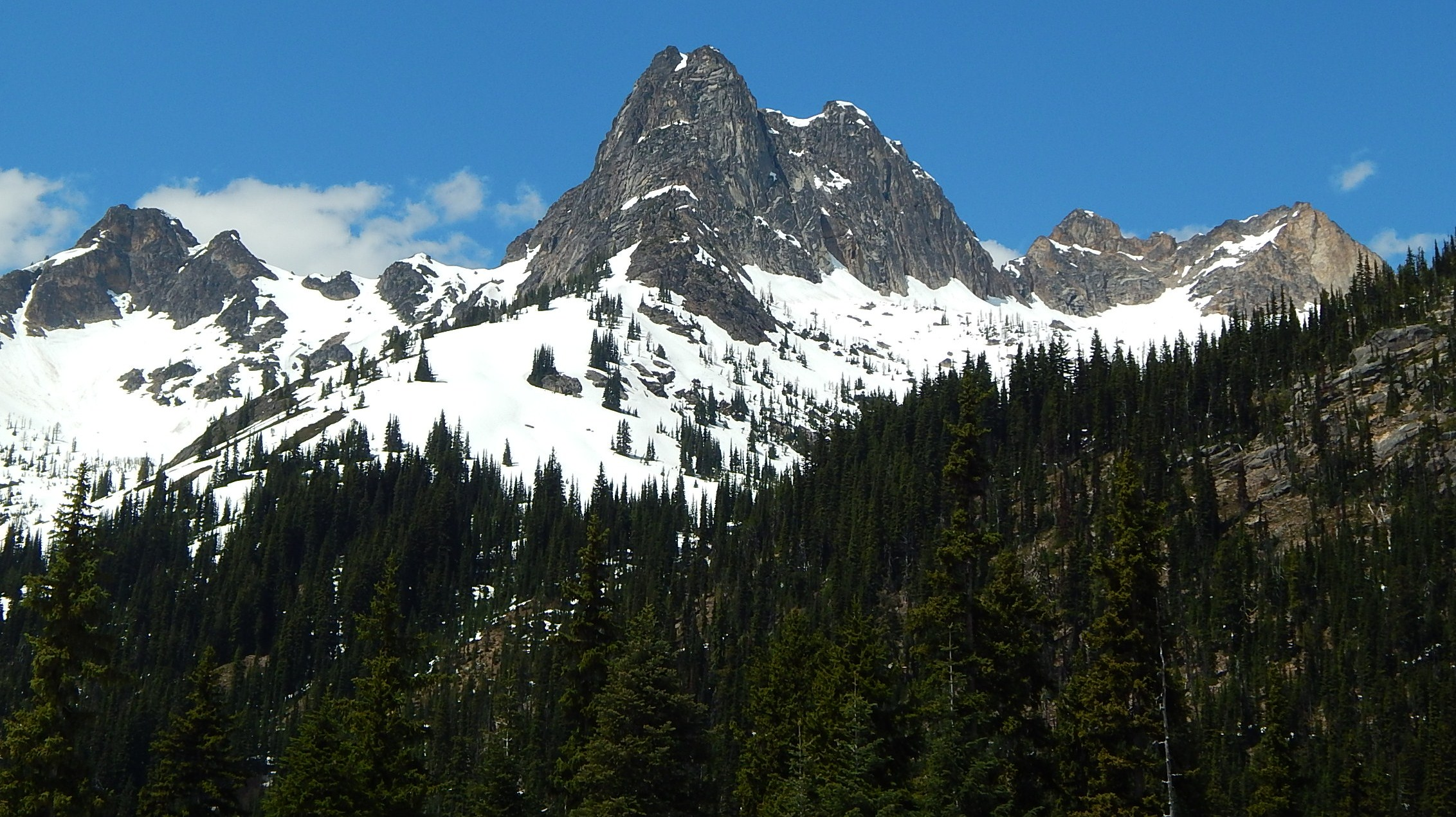
Cutthroat Peak from the east

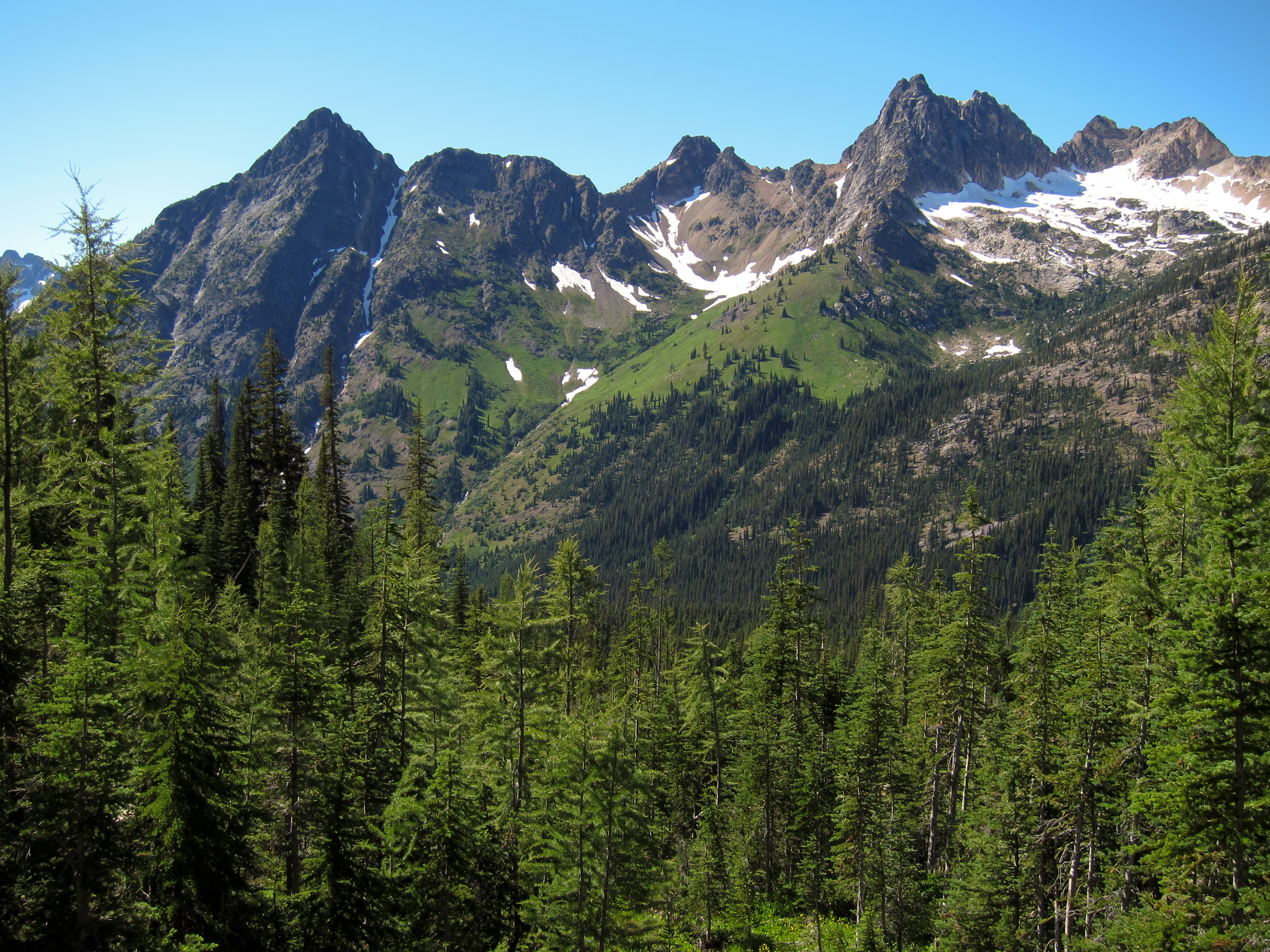
Whistler Mountain (left) and Cutthroat Peak (right)

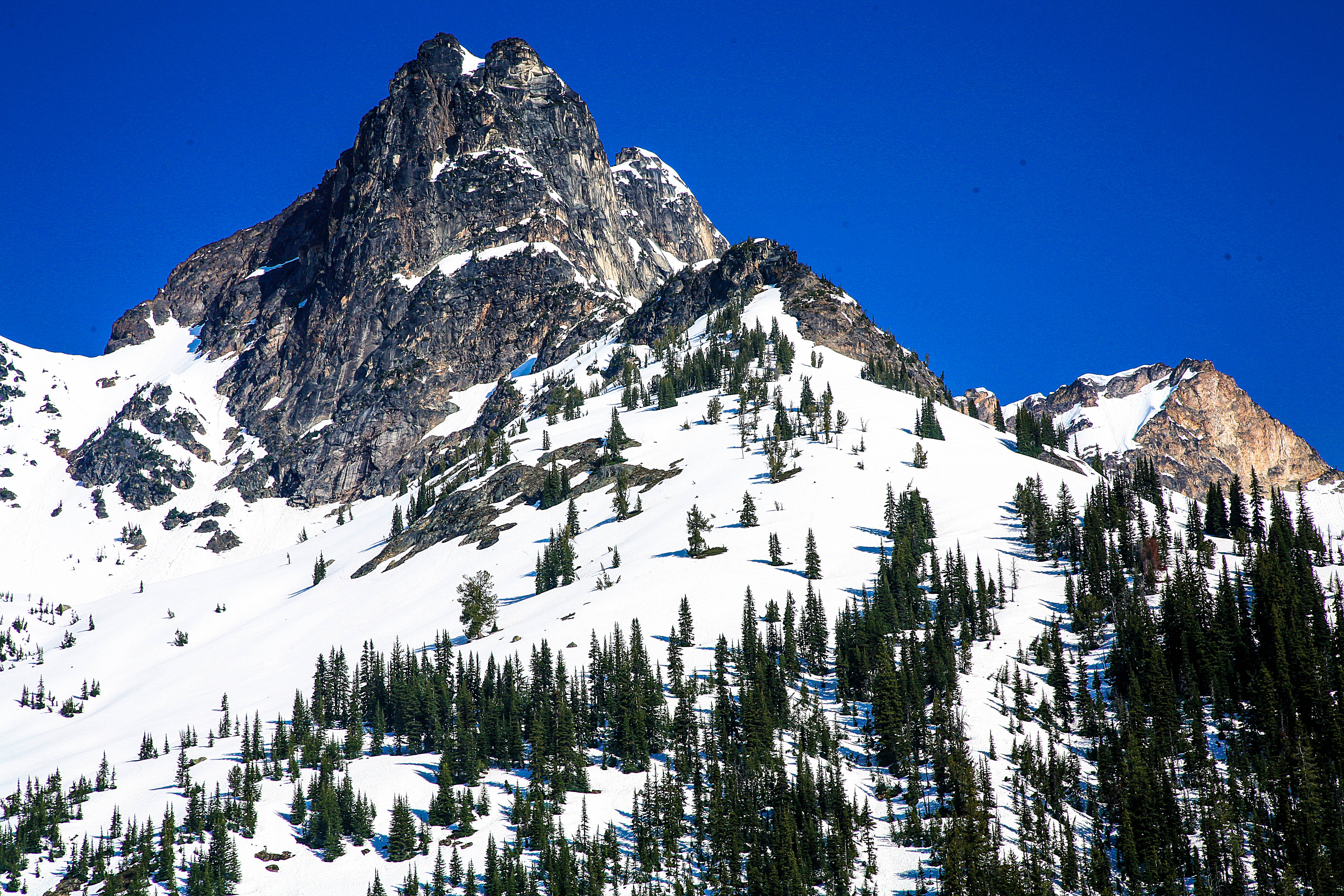

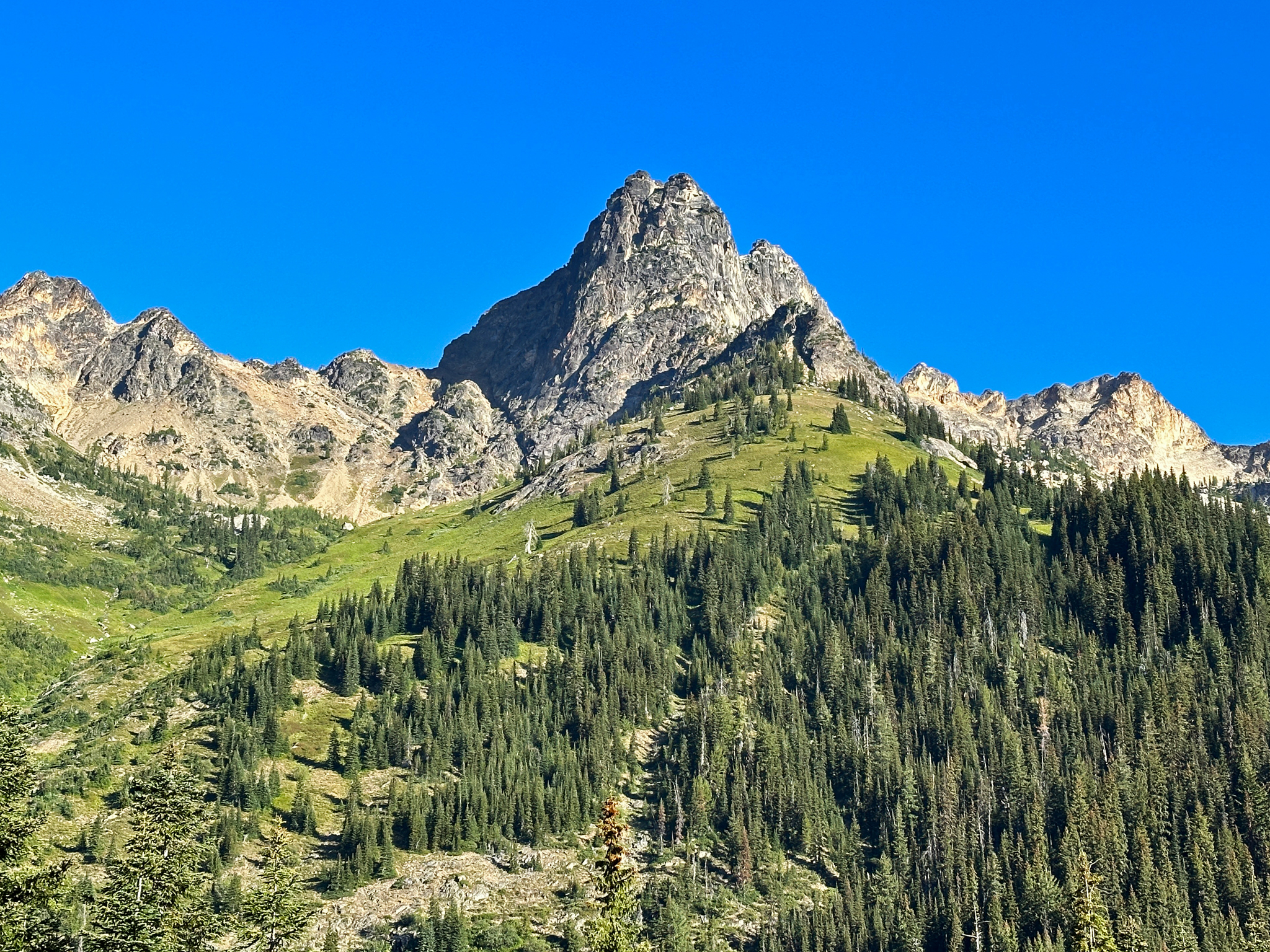

== See also ==
- Geography of the North Cascades
- List of mountain peaks of Washington (state)
