= Okanogan–Wenatchee National Forest =

Protected area in the U.S. state of Washington

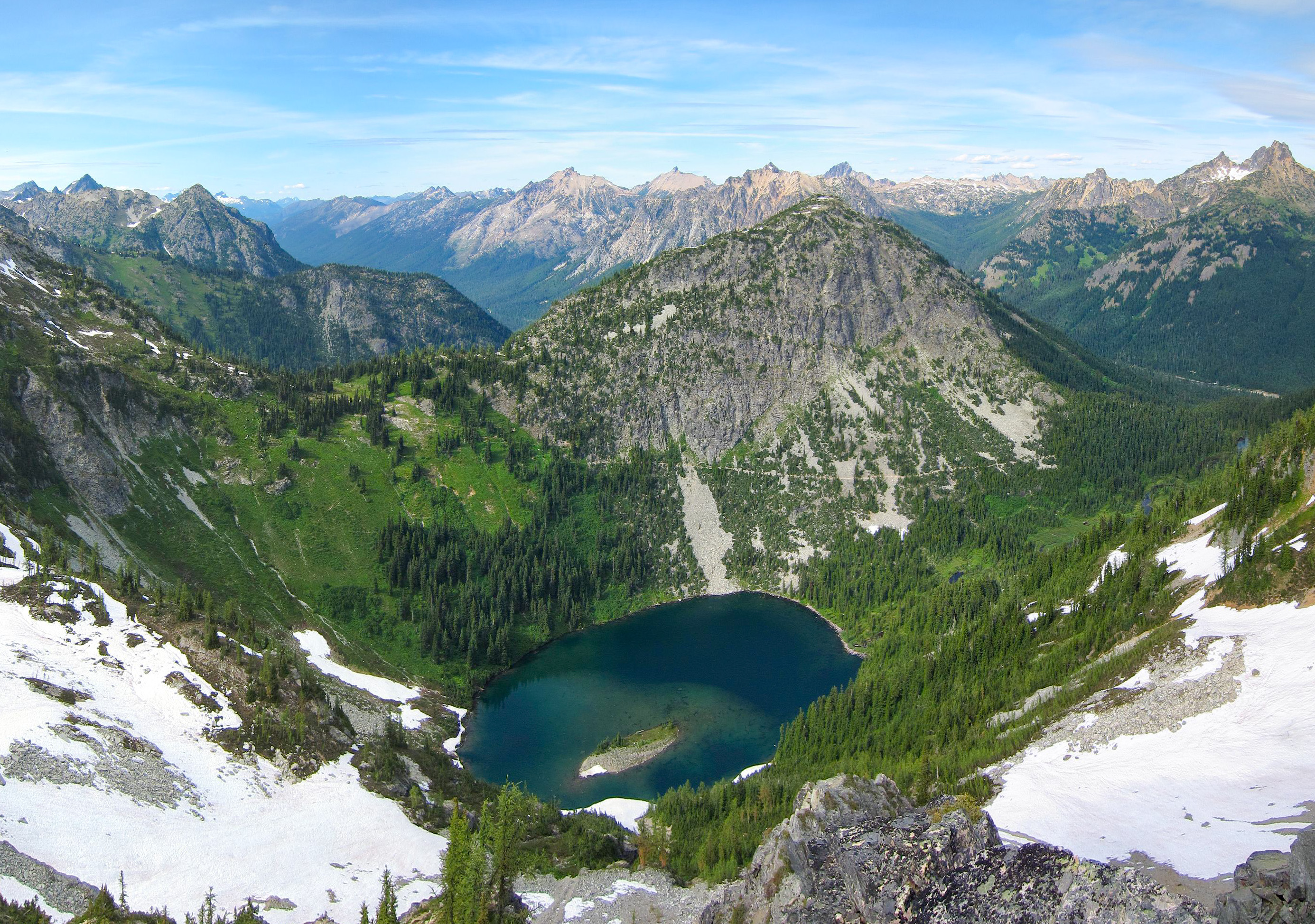
- View from Maple Pass showing Ann Lake and Crooked Bum
- Location in the United States
- Location: Okanogan County, Washington
- Nearest city: Omak, Washington
- Coordinates: 48°33′06″N 120°23′06″W
- Area: 1,499,023 acres (6,066.33 km^{2})
- Established: July 1, 1911
- Visitors: 397,000 (in 2005)
- Governing body: United States Forest Service
- Website: www.fs.usda.gov/okawen/

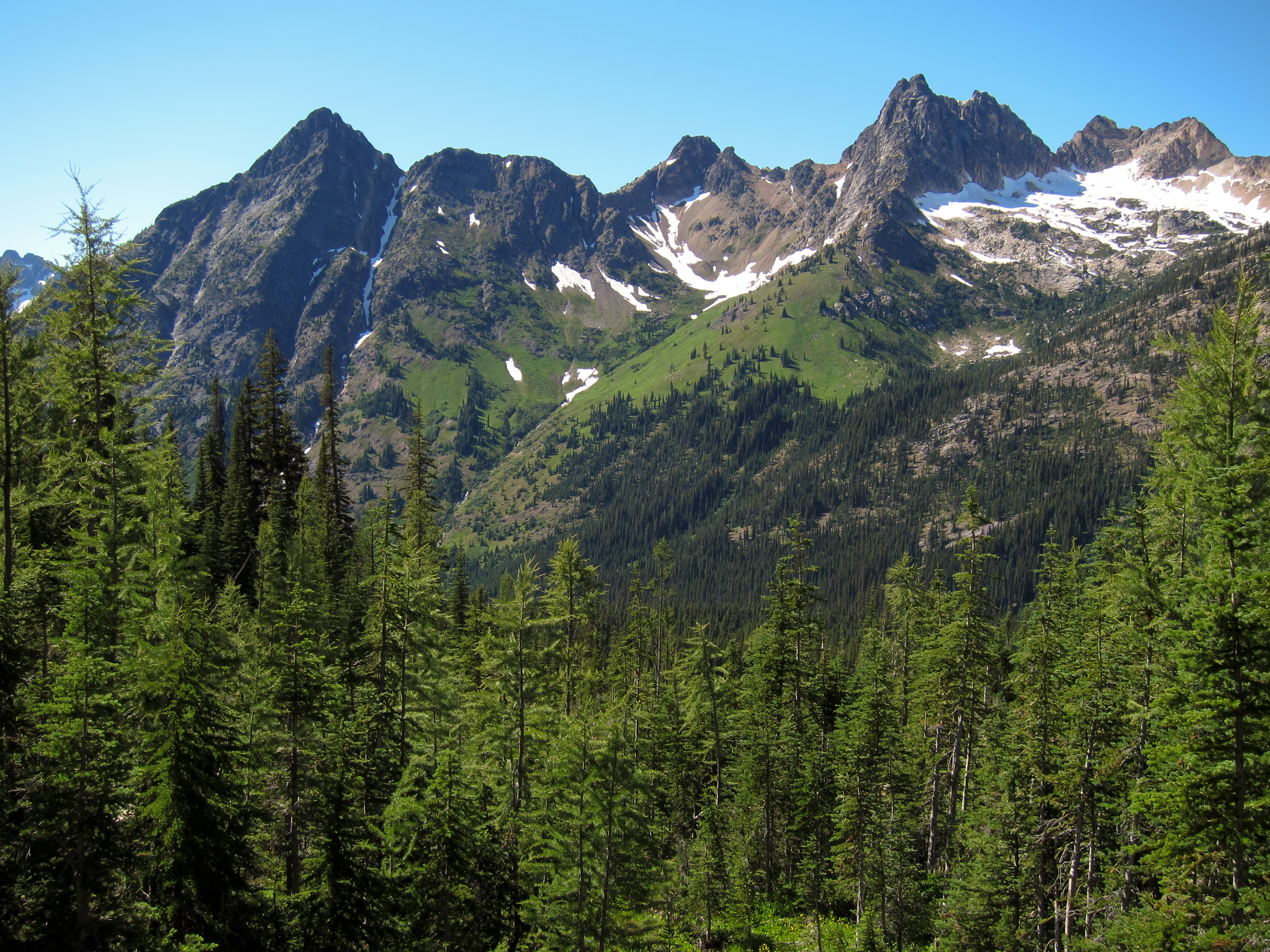
The North Cascades from the northern Okanogan Valley showing Whistler Mountain and Cutthroat Peak

The Okanogan–Wenatchee National Forest is a U.S. National Forest located in Okanogan County in north-central Washington, United States.

The 1,499,013-acre (2,342.208 sq mi; 6,066.29 km^{2}) forest is bordered on the north by British Columbia, on the east by Colville National Forest, on the south by the divide between the Methow and the Stehekin–Lake Chelan valleys, and on the west by North Cascades National Park. The closest significant communities are Omak and Okanogan.

Managed by the United States Forest Service, its headquarters are in Wenatchee. It is the second-largest national forest (after the Nez Perce National Forest in Idaho) that is contained entirely within one county and largest of which in Washington.

Most of the Pasayten Wilderness (excluding its westernmost part, which lies in the Mount Baker-Snoqualmie National Forest), and the northeast portion (about 63%) of Lake Chelan-Sawtooth Wilderness are part of the forest, with the balance lying in the Mount Baker-Snoqualmie National Forest.

The western part of the forest is wetter than the dry and less temperate east. The vegetation varies similarly, from the western boreal forest, to the eastern high-elevation steppe. A 1993 Forest Service study estimated that the extent of old growth in the forest was 316,000 acres (128,000 ha), a majority of which was lodgepole pine forests. Wildfires are not uncommon in the Okanogan National Forest. Notable fires include the 2006 Tripod Complex, the 2014 Carlton Complex and the 2015 Okanogan Complex fires.

The Okanogan National Forest was established on July 1, 1911, from a portion of the Chelan National Forest. On July 1, 1921, the entire forest was transferred back to the Chelan National Forest, but on March 23, 1955, the transfer was reverted.

The Wenatchee National Forest has an area of 1,735,394 acres (2,711.55 sq mi, or 7,022.89 km^{2}); it extends about 137 miles along the eastern slopes of the Cascade Range of Washington, USA from Okanogan National Forest to Gifford Pinchot National Forest. The forest is located in Chelan, Kittitas and Yakima counties.

== Wilderness areas ==
There are six officially designated wilderness areas within Wenatchee National Forest that are part of the National Wilderness Preservation System. All of them lie partially in neighboring National Forests (as indicated).

- Alpine Lakes Wilderness (partly in Snoqualmie NF)
- Glacier Peak Wilderness (partly in Mount Baker NF)
- Goat Rocks Wilderness (mostly in Gifford Pinchot NF)
- Henry M. Jackson Wilderness (partly in Snoqualmie NF (46.2%); Mount Baker NF (27.2%))
- Lake Chelan-Sawtooth Wilderness (mostly in Okanogan NF)
- William O. Douglas Wilderness (partly in Gifford Pinchot NF)

=== Waptus Lake ===
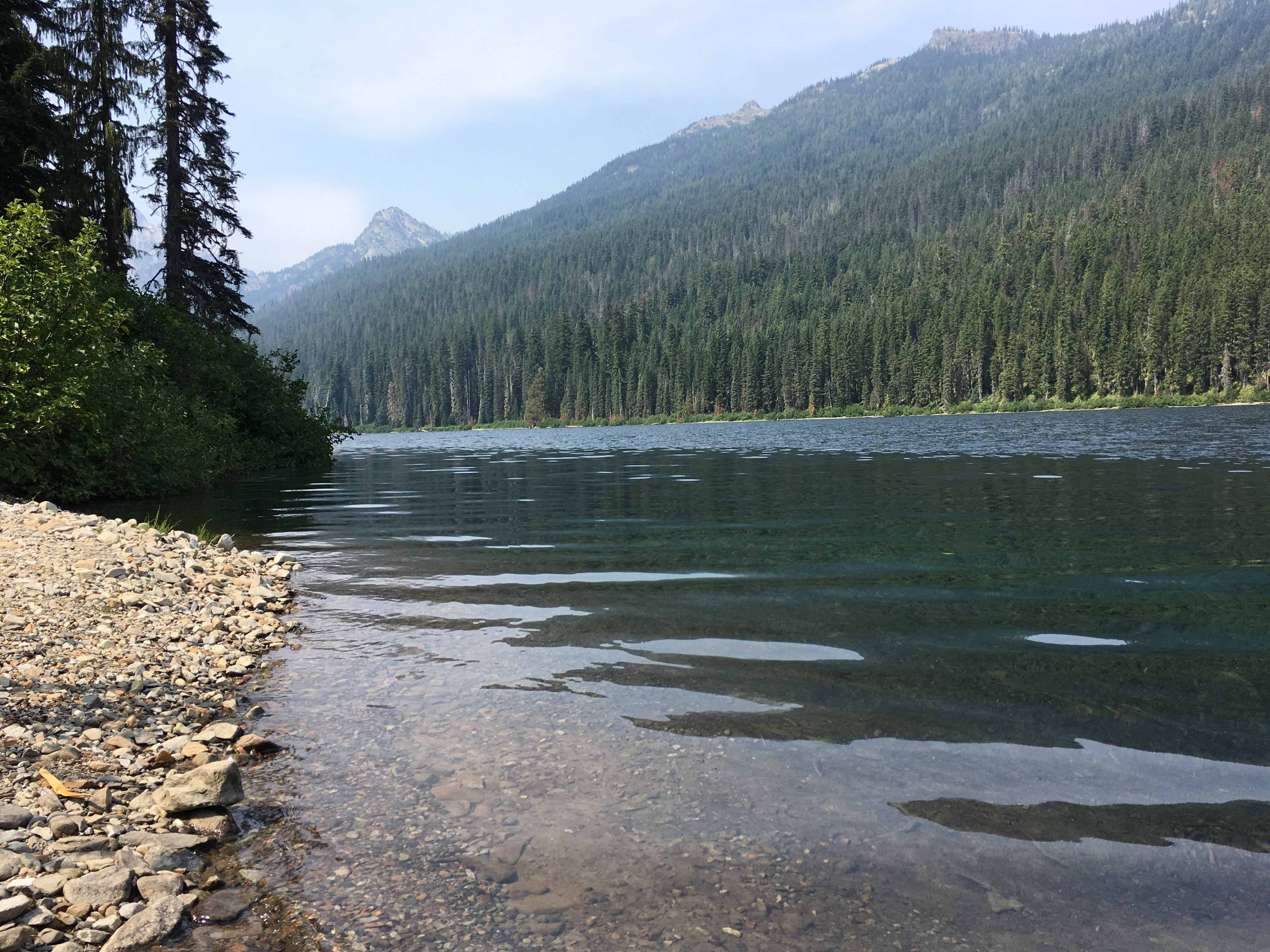
A view of Waptus Lake

Nearly two miles long and accessible only by hiking or horse trails, Waptus Lake is the largest Alpine lake in the National Forest. Drained by the Waptus River, it is notable for its views of Summit Chief and Bears Breast mountains.

== Ecology ==
A 1993 United States Forest Service study estimated that the extent of old growth in the Forest was 318,800 acres (129,000 ha). Wildfires are not uncommon in the National Forest. In September 2012, a severe lightning storm ignited hundreds of fires, the largest of which were located southwest of the city of Wenatchee and east of Blewett Pass. Significant wildfires occurred again in July 2014, in the Chiwaukum and Entiat Mountains. A lightning strike near Jolly Mountain on August 11, 2017, ultimately burned more than 38,000 acres and forced significant evacuations.

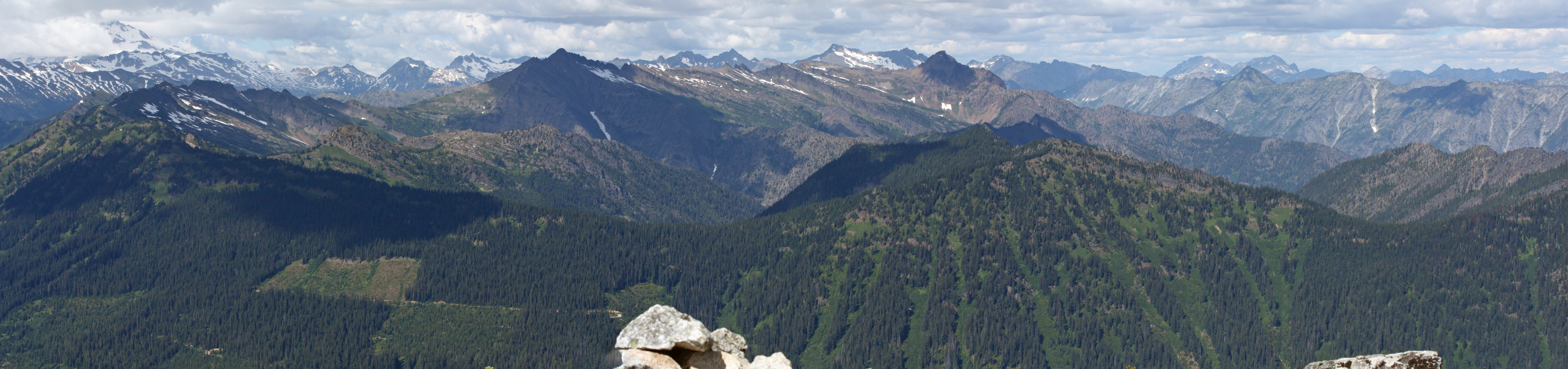
Panoramic view of the Wenatchee River watershed, Wenatchee National Forest

== Administration ==
The Okanogan National Forest was administratively combined with the Wenatchee National Forest in 2000, although the boundaries for each forest remained unchanged, and in 2007, it administratively became known as the Okanogan–Wenatchee National Forest. The headquarters are in Wenatchee, Washington.

Administration is divided across 6 Ranger districts:

- Chelan Ranger District (Headquarters: Chelan, WA)
- Cle Elum Ranger District (Headquarters: Cle Elum, WA)
- Entiat Ranger District (Headquarters: Entiat, WA)
- Methow Valley Ranger District (Headquarters: Winthrop, WA)
- Natches Ranger District (Headquarters: Naches, WA)
- Wenatchee River Ranger District (Headquarters: Leavenworth, WA)

== History ==
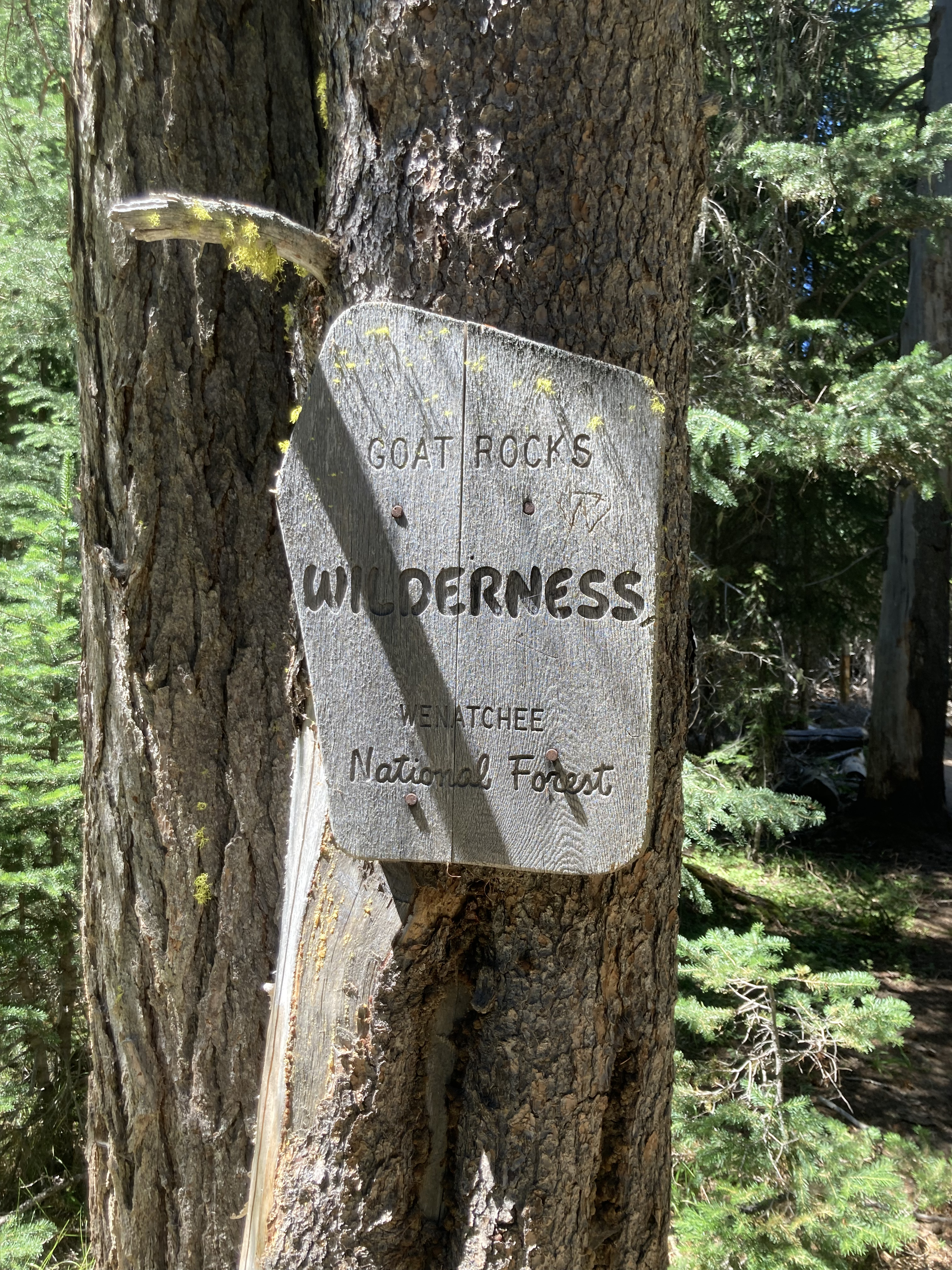
Sign marking the entrance to the Goat Rocks Wilderness

The Forest Reserve Act of 1891 gave the President the authority to establish forest reserves for the United States Department of the Interior. After passage of the Transfer Act of 1905, forest reserves became part of the United States Department of Agriculture in the newly created United States Forest Service. The Chelan National Forest was established by the Forest Service on July 1, 1908, from 2,492,500 acres (1,008,700 ha) from a portion of the Washington National Forest, and was named after the city of Chelan, where its headquarters were. The forest's initial area of 1,732,820 acres (701,250 ha) extended from the northern Okanogan River near the Canada–United States border to divide the Lake Chelan and Entiat watersheds to the southern Cascade Crest. On July 1, 1911, the forest partly transformed into Okanogan National Forest. However, Chelan National Forest was still existent, then only occupying the drainage basin of Lake Chelan and Entiat.

The Conconully, Loomis, Squaw Creek, Sweat Creek, Twisp and Winthrop ranger districts were formed between 1911 and 1915. On July 1, 1921, the entire forest reunited back into the Chelan National Forest, and the term Okanogan was discontinued. Subsequently, another ranger district was established, the Chelan Ranger District. Portions of the Loomis Ranger District, along with the Sweat Creek Ranger District, absorbed to become the Loomis State Forest, later abandoned. The forest's ranger area underwent a number of smaller changes until the mid-1940s. The Squaw Creek Ranger District was absorbed by the Twisp Ranger District in the early 1930s, while the Forest Service Monument 83 lookout was constructed in neighboring British Columbia as an accident. The Pasayten Ranger District was later created from a portion of the Winthrop Ranger District, and the Conconully Ranger District became the Okanogan Ranger District. The western part of the Colville National Forest transferred into the Chelan National Forest in 1943. On March 23, 1955, Chelan National Forest again became the Okanogan National Forest, then headquartered in the city of Okanogan. As per the change, the rename of the Conconully Ranger District was reverted.

In 1968, the Pasayten Wilderness was established, introducing over 200,000 acres (81,000 ha) to the forest. The United States Congress designated almost 65 percent of the forest's area as the Lake Chelan-Sawtooth Wilderness under the National Wilderness Preservation System around 1984, upon land formerly occupied by the former Chelan Division of the Washington Forest Reserve.

The first forest supervisor of Wenatchee National Forest was Albert H. Sylvester, who named over a thousand natural features in the region.

On October 15, 2024 a U.S. Navy EA-18G Growler crashed east of Mt. Rainer, causing closures in the Pear Butte region of the Natches Ranger District from October 21 - December 31 as the military searched for debris relate to the incident.

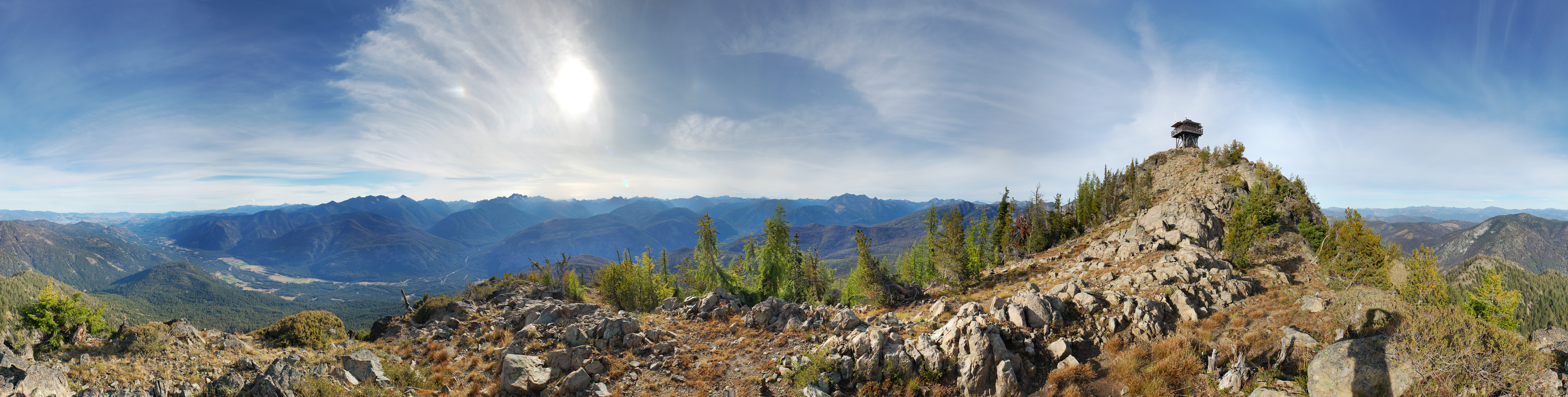
360° panorama near the summit of Goat Peak in the Okanogan National Forest. Photographed on a September afternoon, this photo includes sweeping views of the Methow Valley and the greater Cascade Range including glaciated Silver Star Mountain. High ice clouds create sun dogs on either side of the sun. Goat Peak Lookout is prominent on the righthand side.

== See also ==
- List of national forests of the United States
- Jack Creek Fire
- Left Hand Fire
