= Hinkhouse Peak =

Mountain in Washington, United States of America

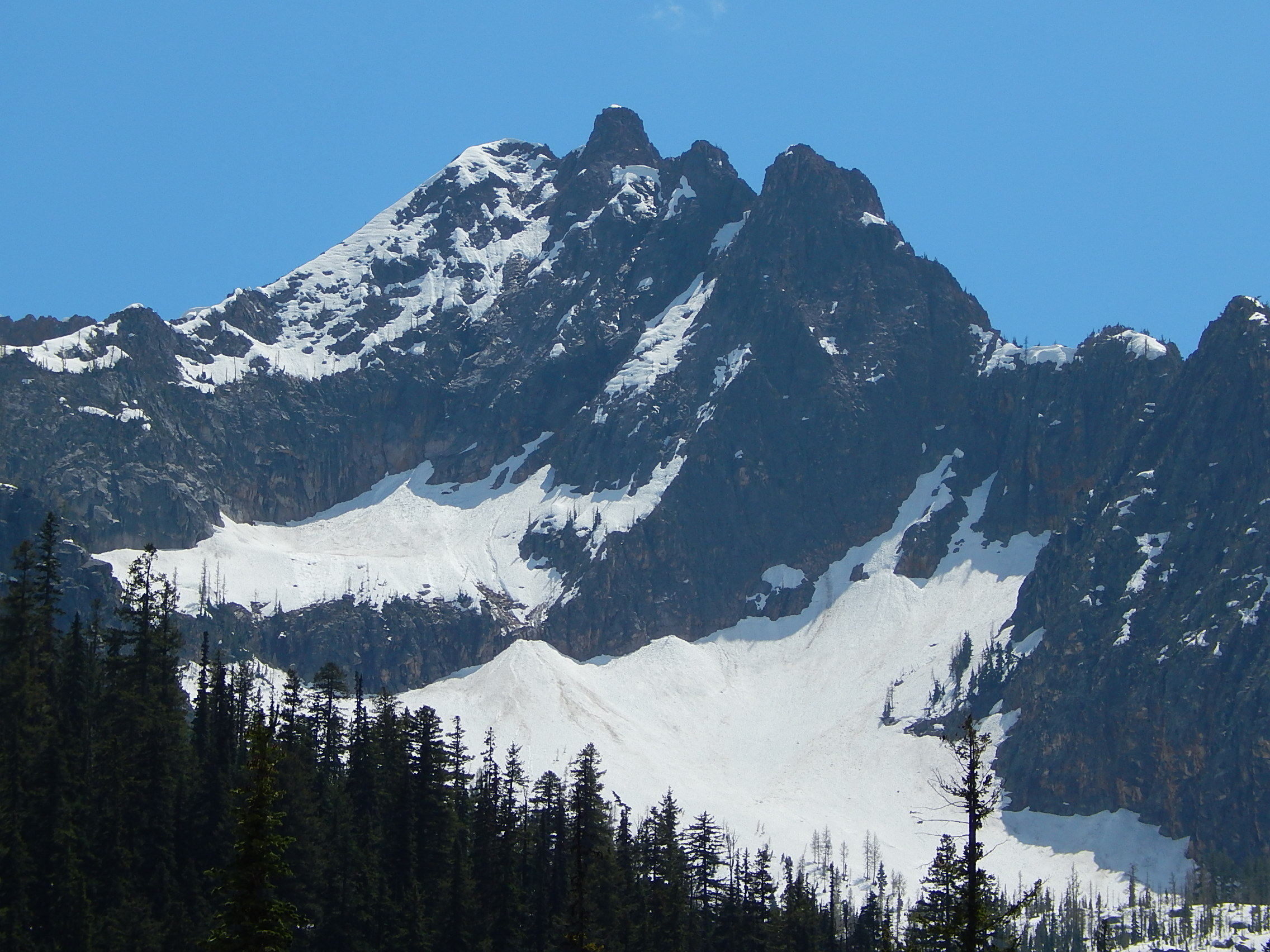
- North aspect (Okanogan County side)

Highest point
- Elevation: 7,566 ft (2,306 m)
- Prominence: 760 ft (232 m)
- Parent peak: Early Winters Spires (7,807 ft)
- Isolation: 1.74 mi (2.80 km)
- Coordinates: 48°32′14″N 120°39′20″W

Geography
- Location within Washington (state) Location within the United States
- Interactive map of Hinkhouse Peak
- Country: United States
- State: Washington
- County: Okanogan / Chelan
- Protected area: Okanogan–Wenatchee National Forest
- Parent range: Cascade Range; North Cascades; Okanogan Range

Climbing
- First ascent: Lage Wernstedt in 1925 or 1926
- Easiest route: Mountaineering

Hinkhouse Peak is a 7,566-foot-elevation (2,306-meter) mountain summit located on the shared border of Okanogan County and Chelan County in Washington state. It is part of the Okanogan Range which is a sub-range of the North Cascades Range. Hinkhouse Peak is situated on land administered by the Okanogan–Wenatchee National Forest. The nearest higher neighbor is Liberty Bell Mountain, 1.52 miles (2.45 km) to the south. Hinkhouse Peak is situated north of Washington Pass, at the east end of a high ridge which connects to Cutthroat Peak. A high ridge extending northeast connects it to Constitution Crags. Most precipitation runoff from the peak drains into Early Winters Creek which is a tributary of the Methow River, but the south slope drains into a tributary of the Chelan River. Topographic relief is significant as it rises nearly 3,200 feet (980 meters) above Early Winters Creek in approximately one mile (1.6 km).

== History ==
The peak's name honors Jimmy D. Hinkhouse (1943–1995), a Washington state mountaineer, economist with the Boeing Corporation in Seattle, and founder of One Step at a Time, a local mountaineering club/12-step substance abuse recovery program. He died of hypothermia at age 52 while climbing Denali. This geographical feature's toponym was officially adopted in 2001 by the United States Board on Geographic Names. Prior to that the peak had several variant names such as State Crag, Towers of the Throat Gripper, Fickle Peak, and Washington Pass Peak.

== Climate ==
Hinkhouse Peak is located in the marine west coast climate zone of western North America. Most weather fronts originating in the Pacific Ocean travel northeast toward the Cascade Mountains. As fronts approach the North Cascades, they are forced upward by the peaks of the Cascade Range (orographic lift), causing them to drop their moisture in the form of rain or snowfall onto the Cascades. As a result, the west side of the North Cascades experiences high precipitation, especially during the winter months in the form of snowfall. Because of maritime influence, snow tends to be wet and heavy, resulting in high avalanche danger. The North Cascades Highway east of Washington Pass has the distinction of being among the top areas in the United States for most avalanche paths per mile of highway. During winter months, weather is usually cloudy, but due to high pressure systems over the Pacific Ocean that intensify during summer months, there is often little or no cloud cover during the summer.

== Geology ==
The North Cascades features some of the most rugged topography in the Cascade Range with craggy peaks, ridges, and deep glacial valleys. Geological events occurring many years ago created the diverse topography and drastic elevation changes over the Cascade Range leading to the various climate differences.

The history of the formation of the Cascade Mountains dates back millions of years ago to the late Eocene Epoch. With the North American Plate overriding the Pacific Plate, episodes of volcanic igneous activity persisted. In addition, small fragments of the oceanic and continental lithosphere called terranes created the North Cascades about 50 million years ago. Hinkhouse Peak is carved mostly from granite of the Golden Horn batholith.

During the Pleistocene period dating back over two million years ago, glaciation advancing and retreating repeatedly scoured the landscape leaving deposits of rock debris. The U-shaped cross section of the river valleys is a result of recent glaciation. Uplift and faulting in combination with glaciation have been the dominant processes which have created the tall peaks and deep valleys of the North Cascades area.

== Gallery ==
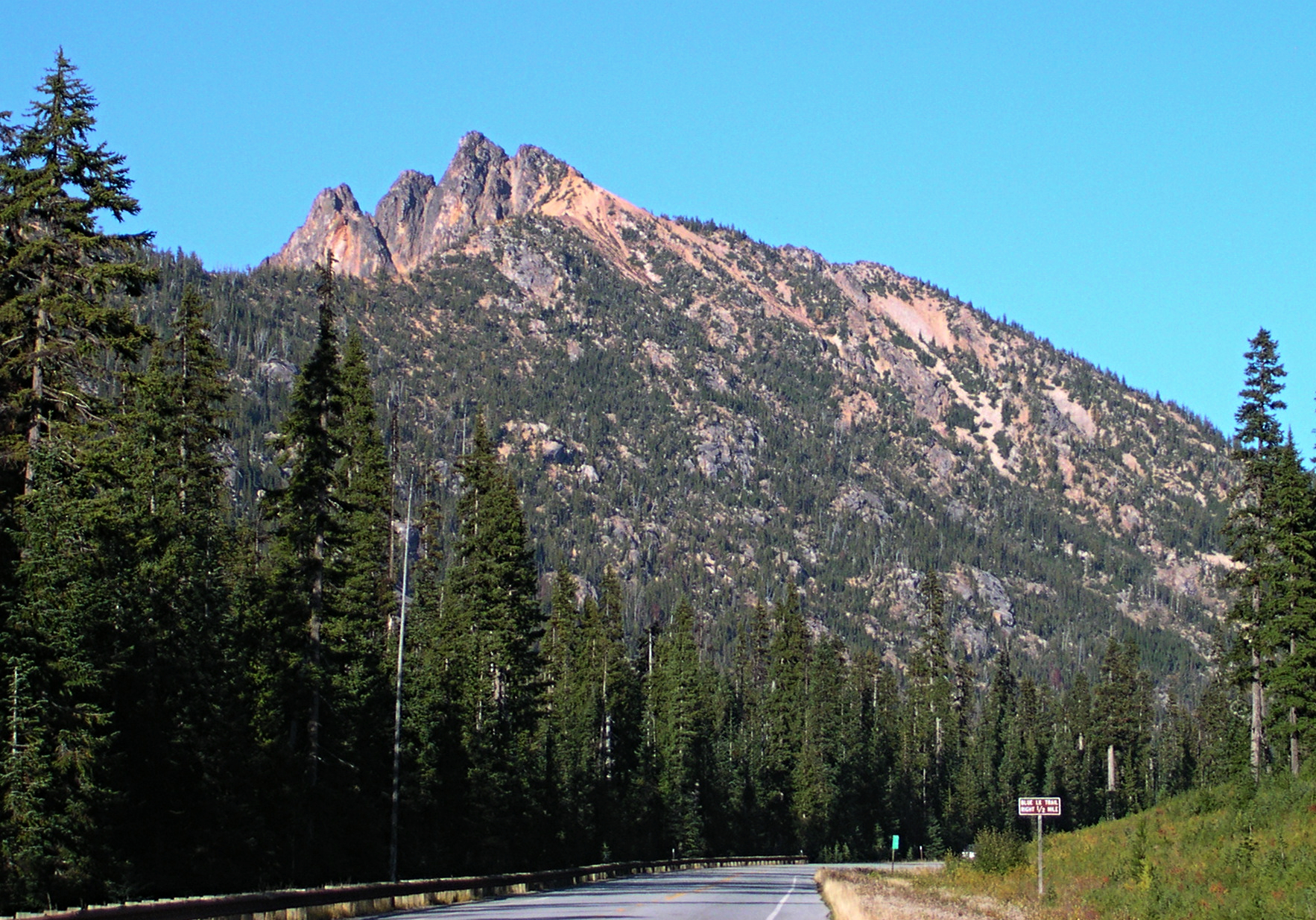
Hinkhouse Peak seen from Highway 20

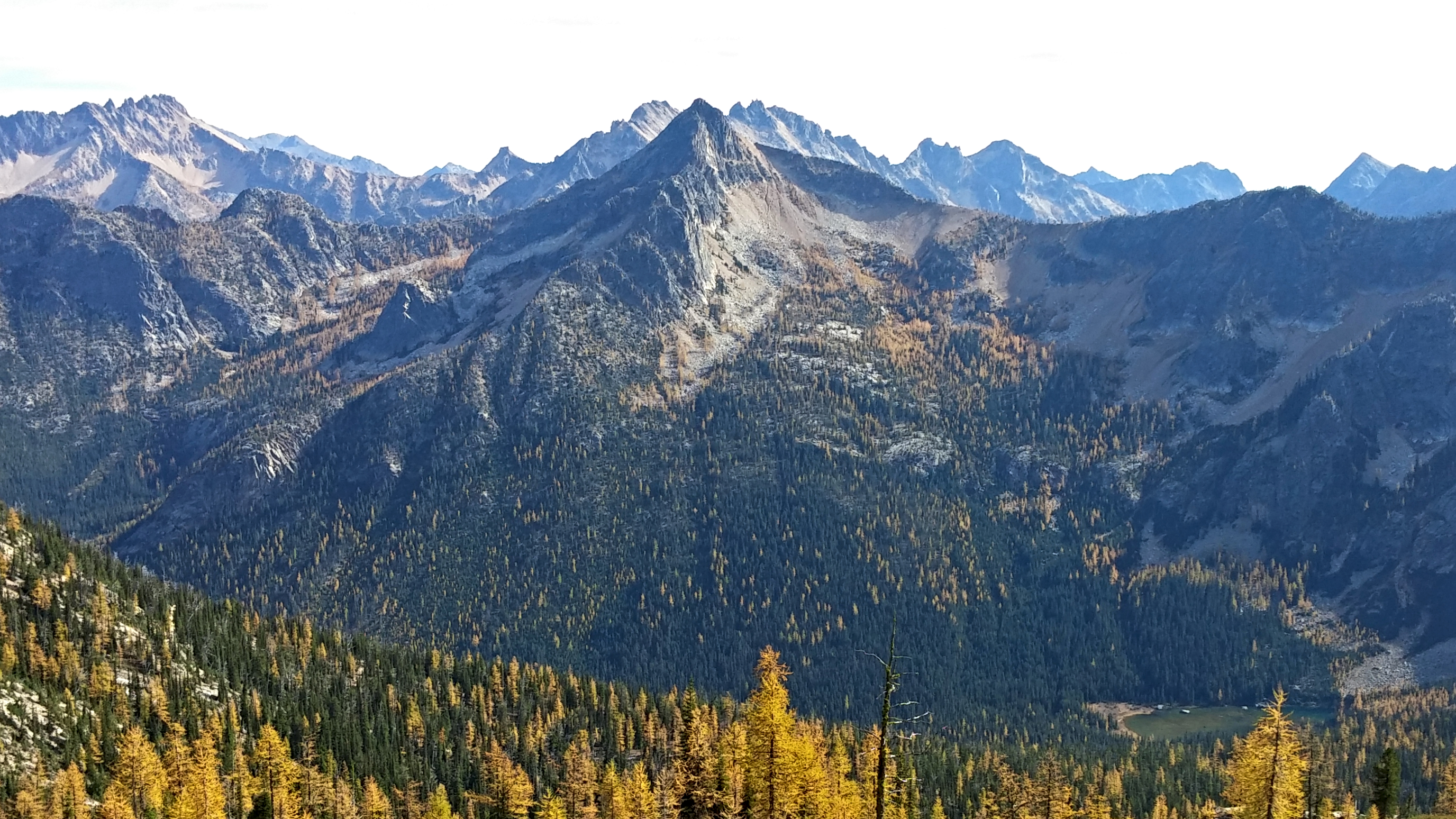
Hinkhouse Peak from PCT

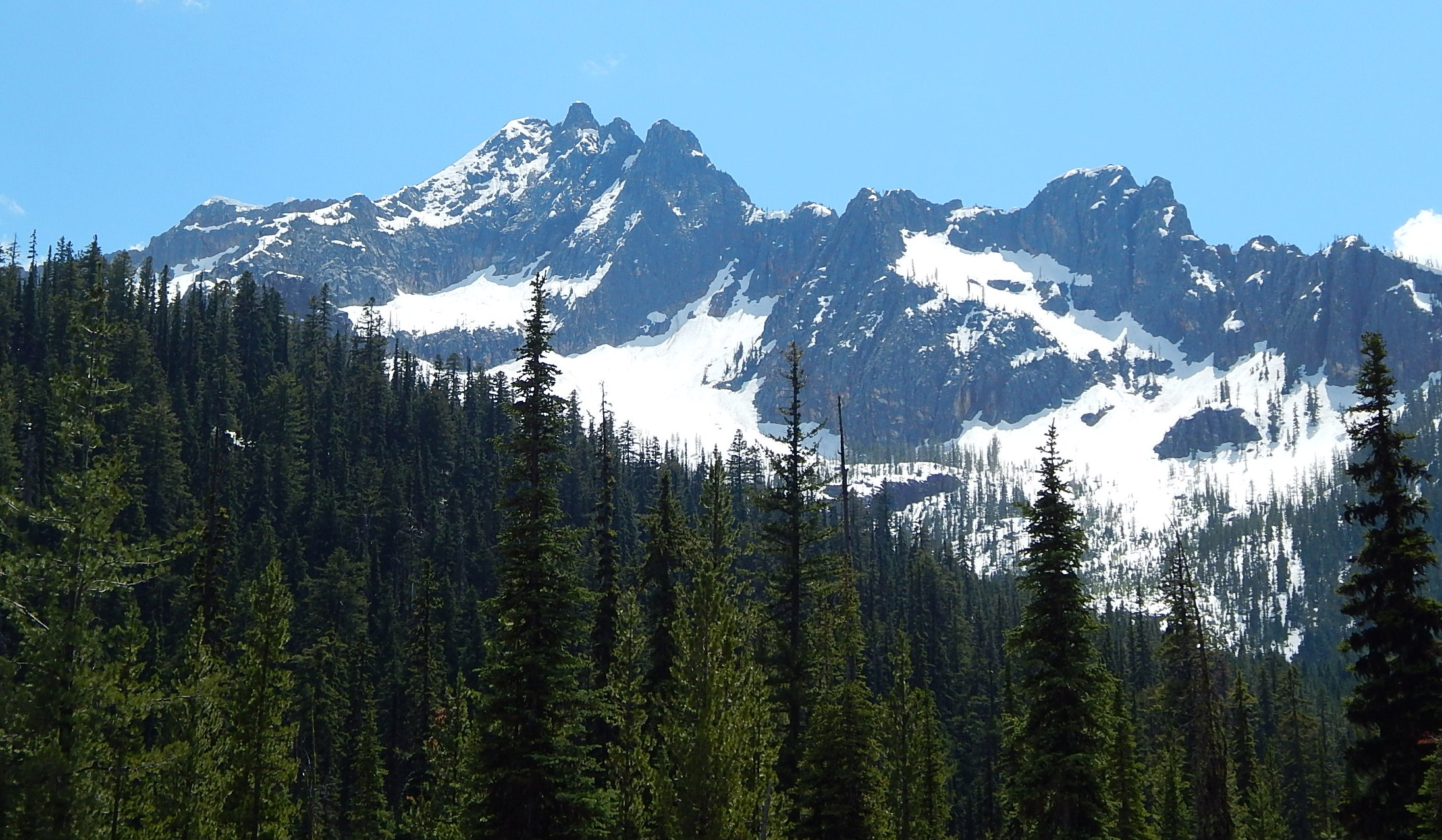
Hinkhouse Peak seen from the Cutthroat Lake Trailhead

== See also ==
- Geography of Washington (state)
- Geology of the Pacific Northwest
