= Blue Lake Peak =

Mountain in Washington (state), United States

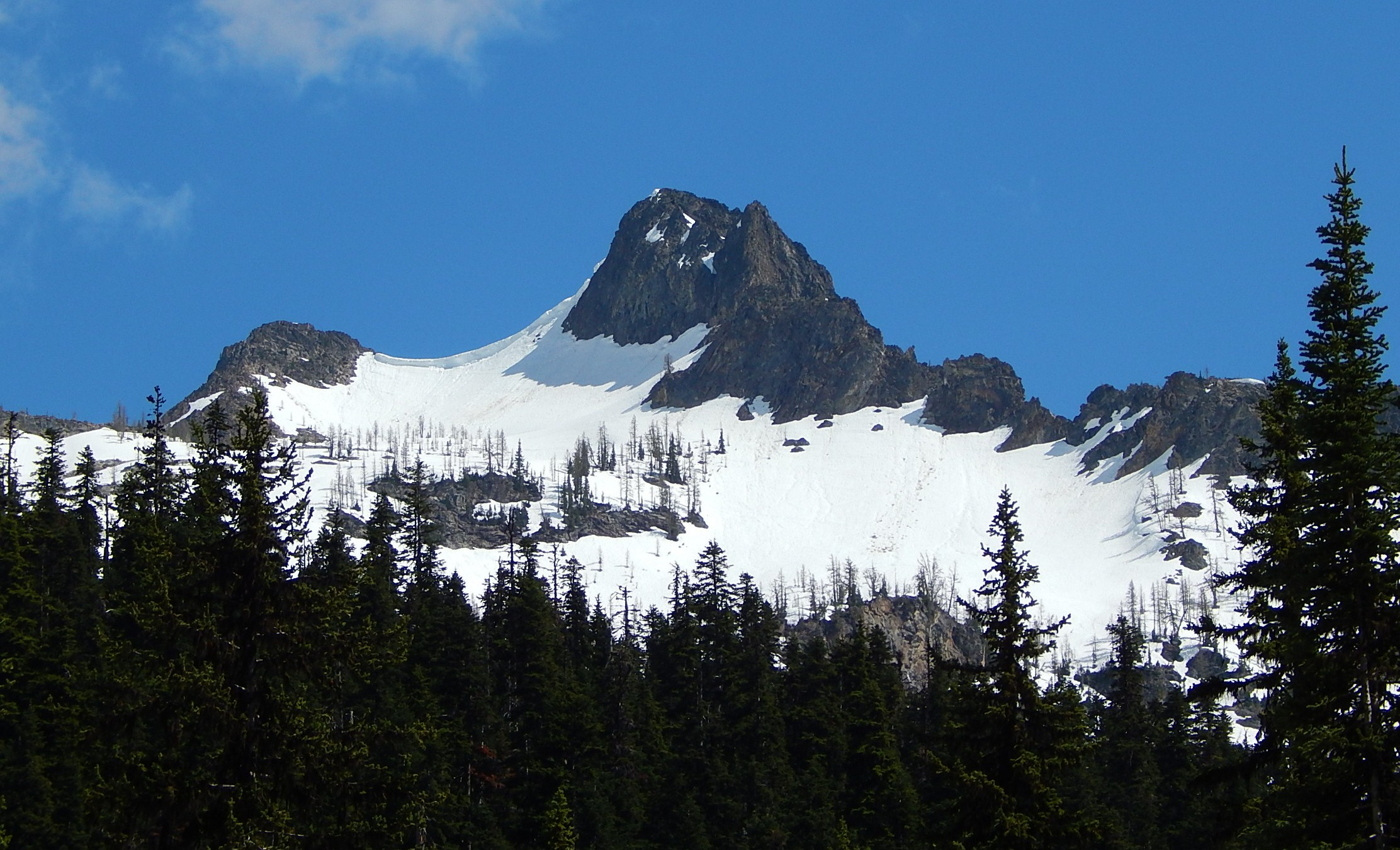
- Blue Lake Peak from North Cascades Highway

Highest point
- Elevation: 7,808 ft (2,380 m)
- Prominence: 493 ft (150 m)
- Parent peak: Wallaby Peak (7,995 ft)
- Isolation: 0.39 mi (0.63 km)
- Coordinates: 48°30′24″N 120°39′26″W

Geography
- Location within Washington (state) Location within the United States
- Interactive map of Blue Lake Peak
- Country: United States
- State: Washington
- County: Chelan / Okanogan
- Protected area: Okanogan–Wenatchee National Forest
- Parent range: North Cascades; Methow Mountains
- Topo map: USGS Washington Pass

Climbing
- First ascent: September 28, 1946 by Fred Beckey, Jerry O'Neil, Charles Welsh
- Easiest route: Scrambling

Blue Lake Peak is a 7,808-foot (2,380-metre) mountain summit in the North Cascades of Washington state. It is located in the Okanogan–Wenatchee National Forest on the shared border of Okanogan County and Chelan County. The peak is situated south of Early Winters Spires, Liberty Bell Mountain, and Washington Pass. Blue Lake is set below its west slope, and Stiletto Peak is to its south. Blue Lake Peak can be seen from the North Cascades Highway at the Blue Lake Trailhead. Precipitation runoff from Blue Lake Peak drains into tributaries of the Chelan River and Methow River. Topographic relief is significant as the summit rises 2,800 feet (850 meters) above Early Winters Creek in one mile (1.6 km). The mountain's toponym has not been officially adopted by the United States Board on Geographic Names. An alternate name, "Wamihaspi Peak," was published by mountaineer and author, Fred Beckey, in his guidebook.

== Climate ==
Weather fronts originating in the Pacific Ocean travel east toward the Cascade Mountains. As fronts approach the North Cascades, they are forced upward by the peaks of the Cascade Range (orographic lift), causing them to drop their moisture in the form of rain or snowfall onto the Cascades. As a result, the west side of the North Cascades experiences high precipitation, especially during the winter months in the form of snowfall. Because of maritime influence, snow tends to be wet and heavy, resulting in high avalanche danger. During winter months, weather is usually cloudy, but due to high pressure systems over the Pacific Ocean that intensify during summer months, there is often little or no cloud cover during the summer. The months July through September offer the most favorable weather for viewing or climbing this peak.

== Geology ==
The North Cascades features some of the most rugged topography in the Cascade Range with craggy peaks and ridges and deep glacial valleys. Geological events occurring many years ago created the diverse topography and drastic elevation changes over the Cascade Range leading to the various climate differences. These climate differences lead to vegetation variety defining the ecoregions in this area.

The history of the formation of the Cascade Mountains dates back millions of years ago to the late Eocene Epoch. With the North American Plate overriding the Pacific Plate, episodes of volcanic igneous activity persisted. In addition, small fragments of the oceanic and continental lithosphere called terranes created the North Cascades about 50 million years ago.

During the Pleistocene period dating back over two million years ago, glaciation advancing and retreating repeatedly scoured the landscape leaving deposits of rock debris. The U-shaped cross section of the river valleys is a result of recent glaciation. Uplift and faulting in combination with glaciation have been the dominant processes which have created the tall peaks and deep valleys of the North Cascades area.

== Gallery ==
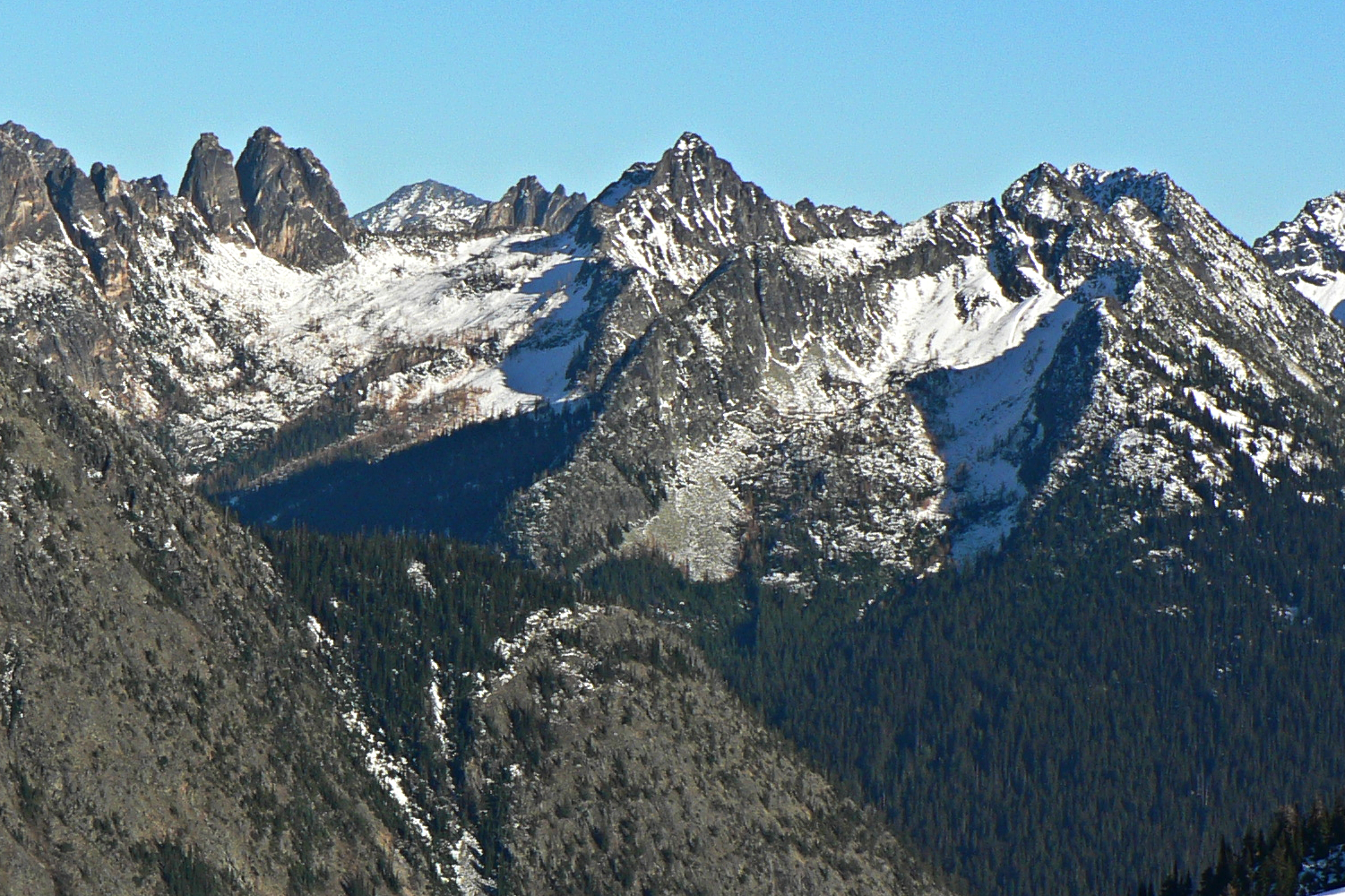
Blue Lake Peak centered, seen from Maple Pass Trail

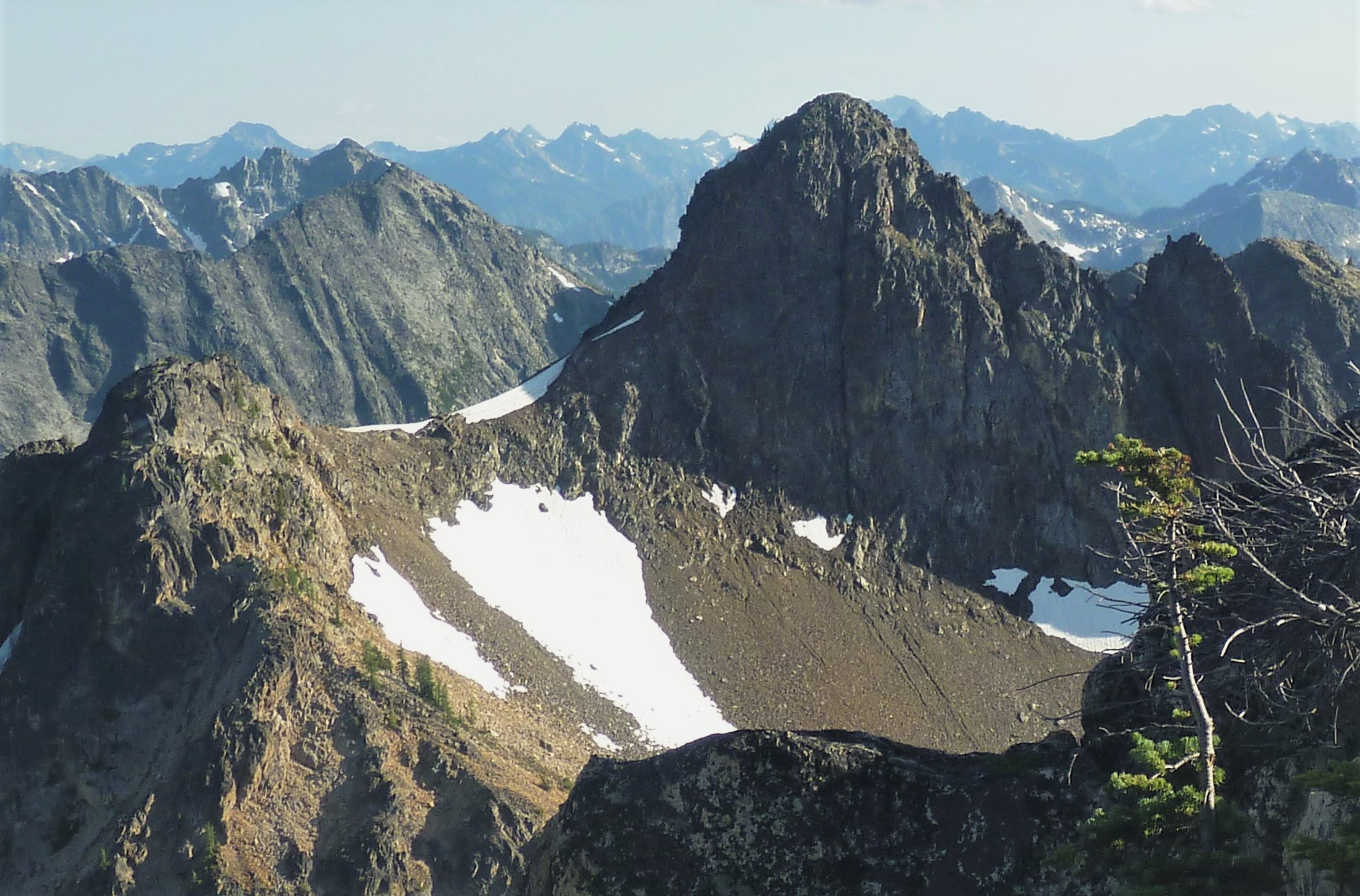
Blue Lake Peak from Early Winters Spires

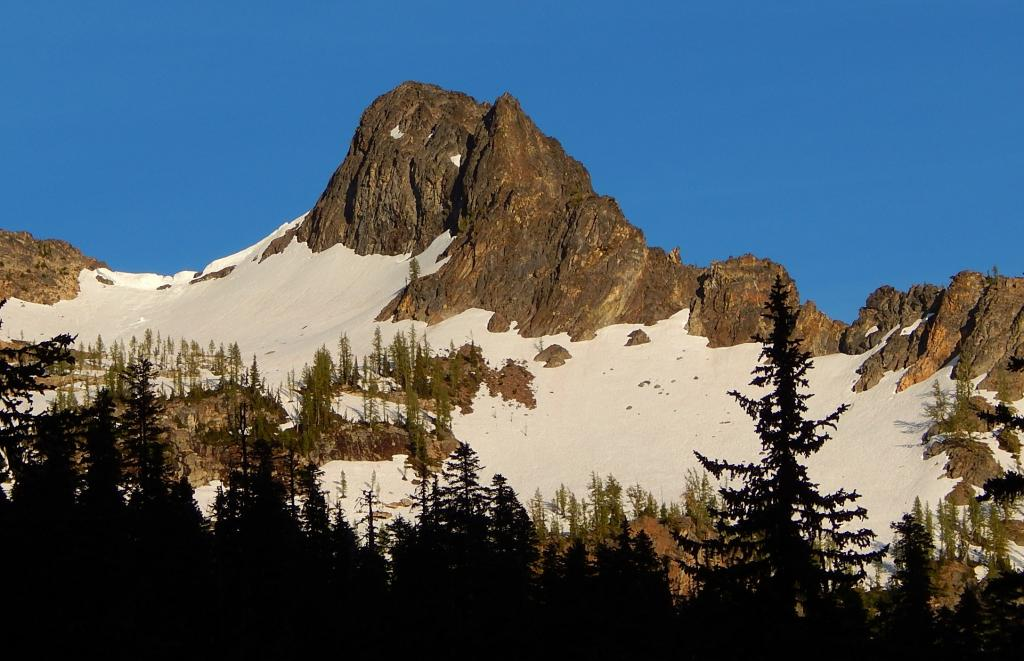
Sunset on Blue Lake Peak

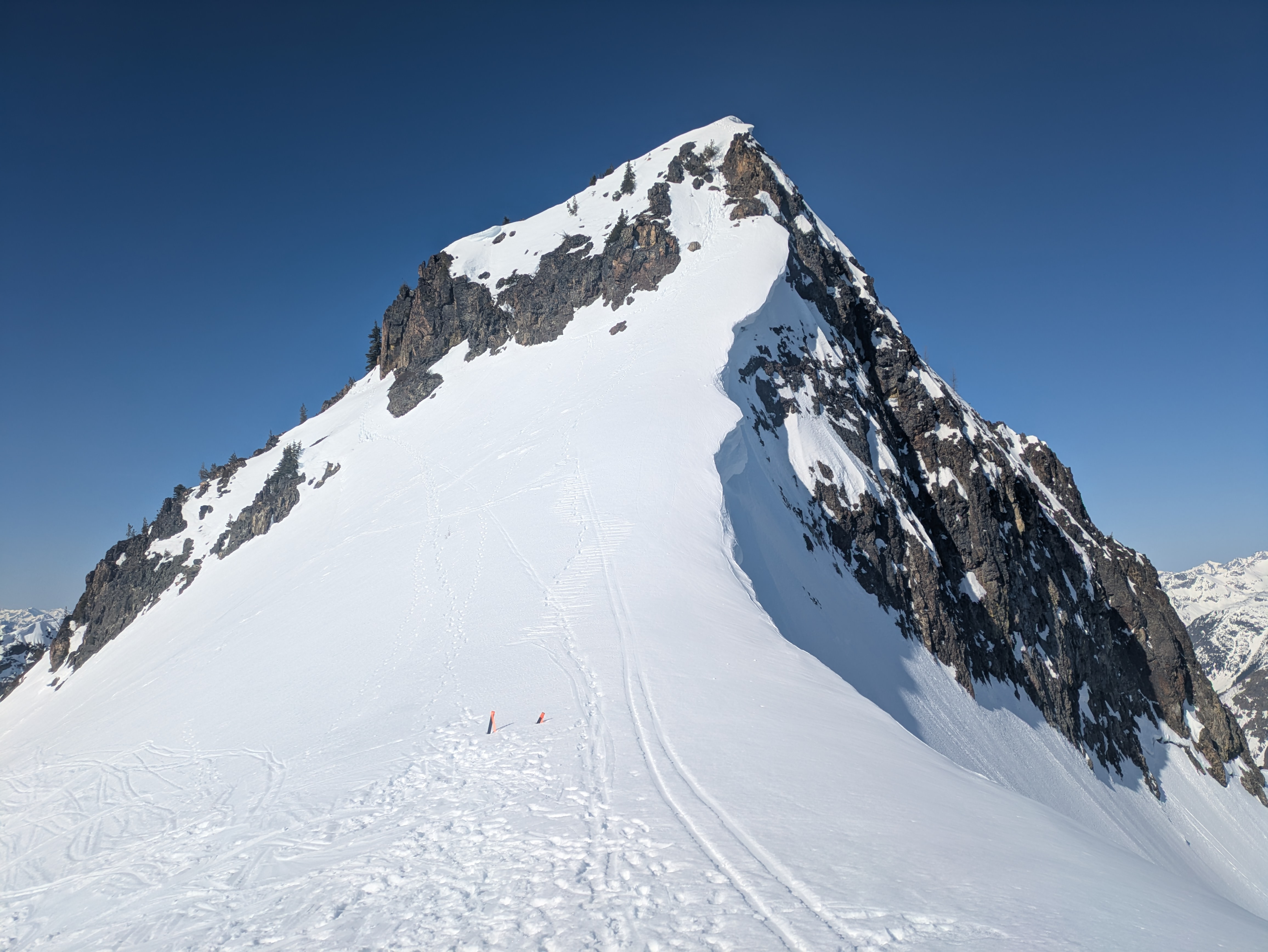
East aspect

== See also ==
- Geography of the North Cascades
