= Lexington Tower =

Mountain in Washington (state), United States

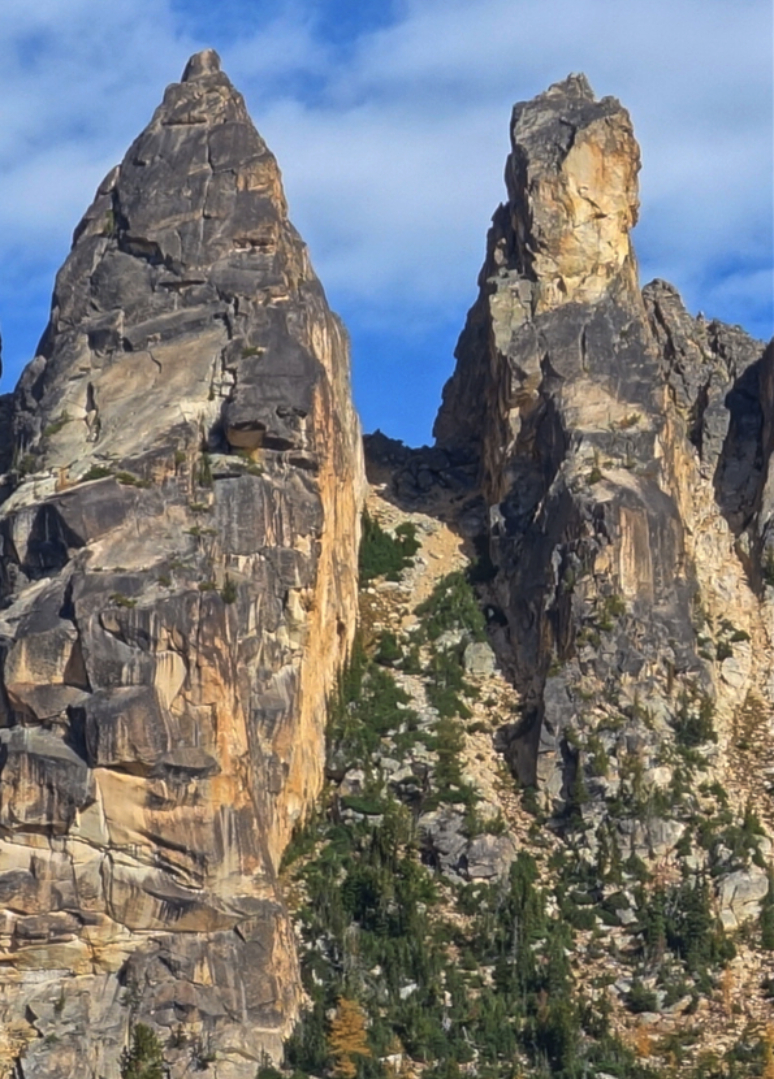
- West aspect of Lexington Tower on the right (Concord Tower to left)

Highest point
- Elevation: 7,560 ft (2,304 m)
- Prominence: 80 ft (24 m)
- Parent peak: Early Winters Spires (7,807 ft)
- Isolation: 0.17 mi (0.27 km)
- Coordinates: 48°30′51″N 120°39′27″W

Naming
- Etymology: Lexington

Geography
- Location within Washington (state) Location within the United States
- Interactive map of Lexington Tower
- Country: United States
- State: Washington
- County: Chelan / Okanogan
- Parent range: Cascade Range; North Cascades
- Topo map: USGS Washington Pass

Geology
- Rock type: Granite

Climbing
- First ascent: 1954
- Easiest route: class 5.7

Lexington Tower is a 7,560-foot-elevation (2,304-meter) granite pinnacle located in the North Cascades, approximately one mile south of Washington Pass along the North Cascades Highway. It is set within the Okanogan–Wenatchee National Forest, on the shared border of Okanogan County and Chelan County in the state of Washington. Lexington Tower is part of the iconic Liberty Bell Group, a group of spires which also includes Liberty Bell Mountain, Concord Tower, and the Early Winters Spires. Precipitation runoff from Lexington Tower drains west into State Creek and east into Early Winters Creek. Topographic relief is significant as the summit rises 2,500 feet (760 meters) above Early Winters Creek in approximately one-half mile.

== Climbing routes ==
The first ascent was made July 5, 1954, by Tim Kelley and Dick McGowan via the North Face.

Rock climbing routes on Lexington Tower:

- North Face - class 5.7 - Tim Kelley, Dick McGowan (1954)
- South Face - class 5.7 - Donald Anderson, Larry Scott (1964)
- East Face - class 5.9+ - Steve Marts, Donald McPherson (1966)
- East Gully - Sandy Bill, Cindy Wade Burgner, Frank Tarver (1966)
- Tooth and Claw - class 5.12a - Steven Risse, Dave Tower (1989)

== Climate ==
Weather fronts originating in the Pacific Ocean travel northeast toward the Cascade Mountains. As fronts approach the North Cascades, they are forced upward by the peaks of the Cascade Range (Orographic lift), causing them to drop their moisture in the form of rain or snowfall onto the Cascades. As a result, the west side of the North Cascades experiences high precipitation, especially during the winter months in the form of snowfall. Because of maritime influence, snow tends to be wet and heavy, resulting in high avalanche danger. The North Cascades Highway east of Washington Pass has the distinction of being among the top areas in the United States for most avalanche paths per mile of highway. During the winter months, weather is usually cloudy, but due to high-pressure systems over the Pacific Ocean that intensify during the summer months, there is often little or no cloud cover during the summer. The months July through September offer the most favorable weather for viewing or climbing Lexington Tower.

== Geology ==
The North Cascades feature some of the most rugged topography in the Cascade Range with craggy peaks, ridges, and deep glacial valleys. Geological events occurring many years ago created the diverse topography and drastic elevation changes over the Cascade Range leading to the various climate differences. The history of the formation of the Cascade Mountains dates back millions of years ago to the late Eocene Epoch. With the North American Plate overriding the Pacific Plate, episodes of volcanic igneous activity persisted. In addition, small fragments of the oceanic and continental lithosphere called terranes created the North Cascades about 50 million years ago. Like many of the peaks of the Washington Pass area, Lexington Tower is composed of granite from the Golden Horn batholith.

During the Pleistocene period dating back over two million years ago, glaciation advancing and retreating repeatedly scoured the landscape leaving deposits of rock debris. The U-shaped cross section of the river valleys is a result of recent glaciation. Uplift and faulting in combination with glaciation have been the dominant processes that have created the tall peaks and deep valleys of the North Cascades area.

== Gallery ==
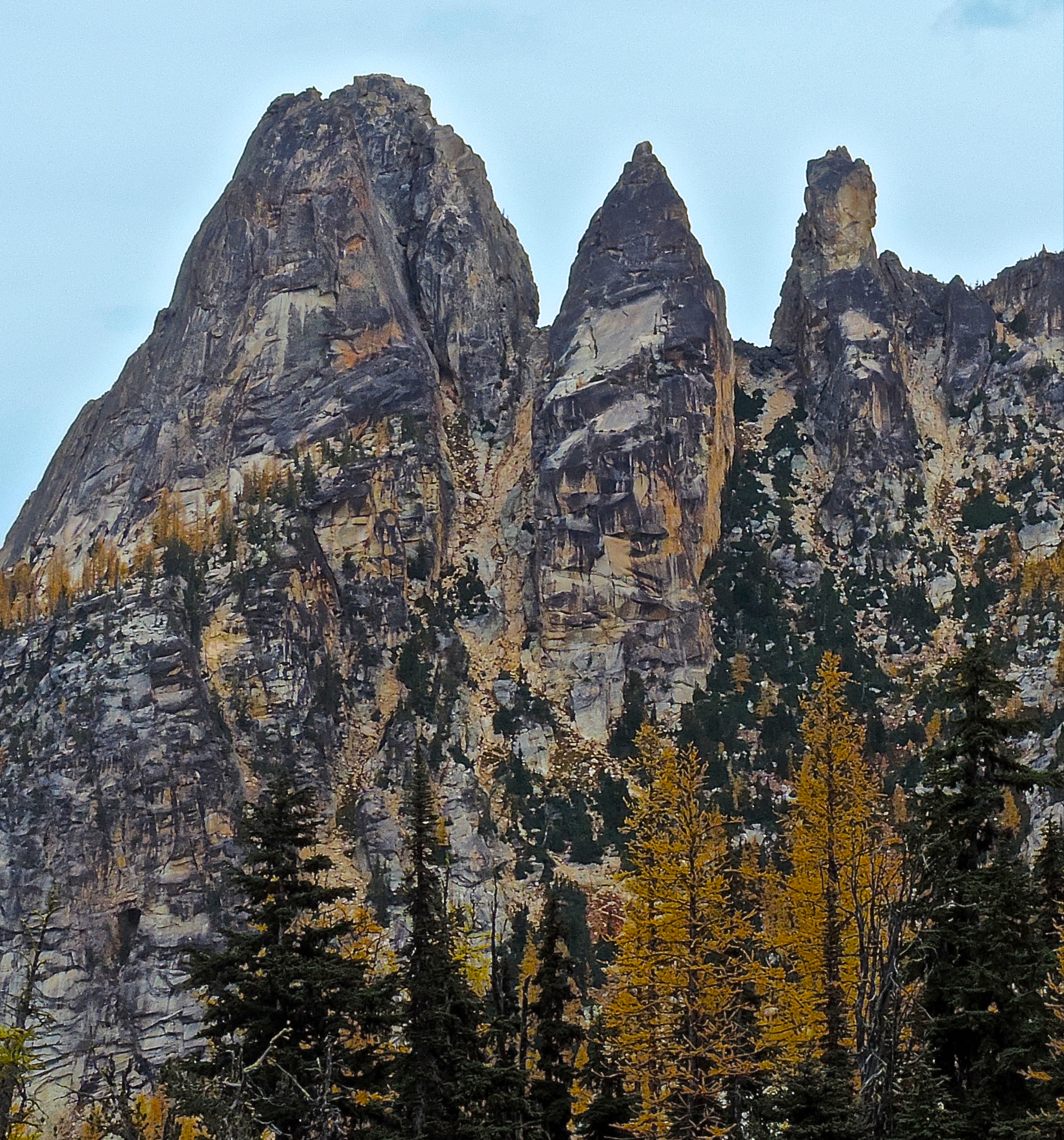
Liberty Bell Mountain (left), Concord Tower, Lexington Tower (right) from west

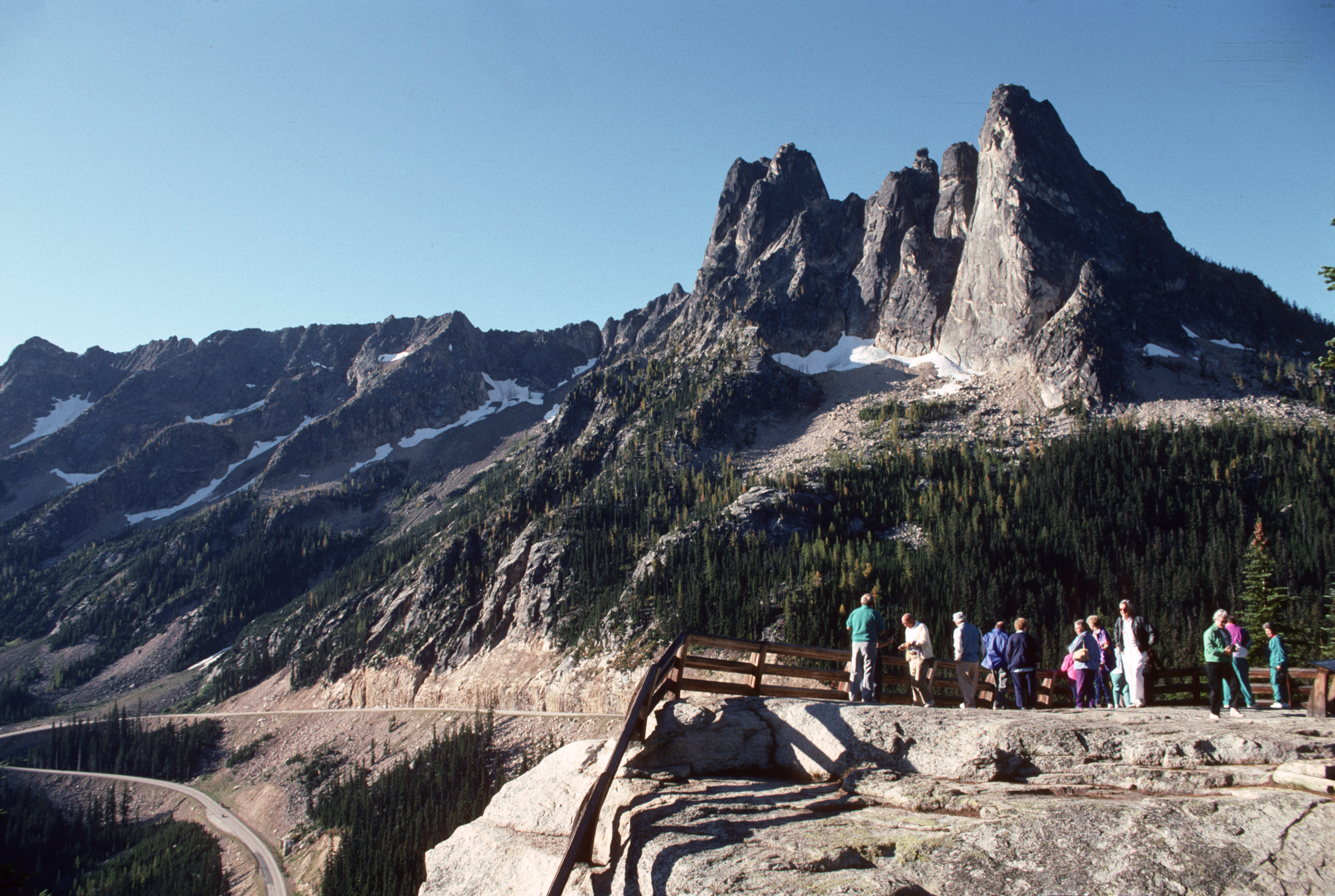
Liberty Bell Group seen from Washington Pass overlook.

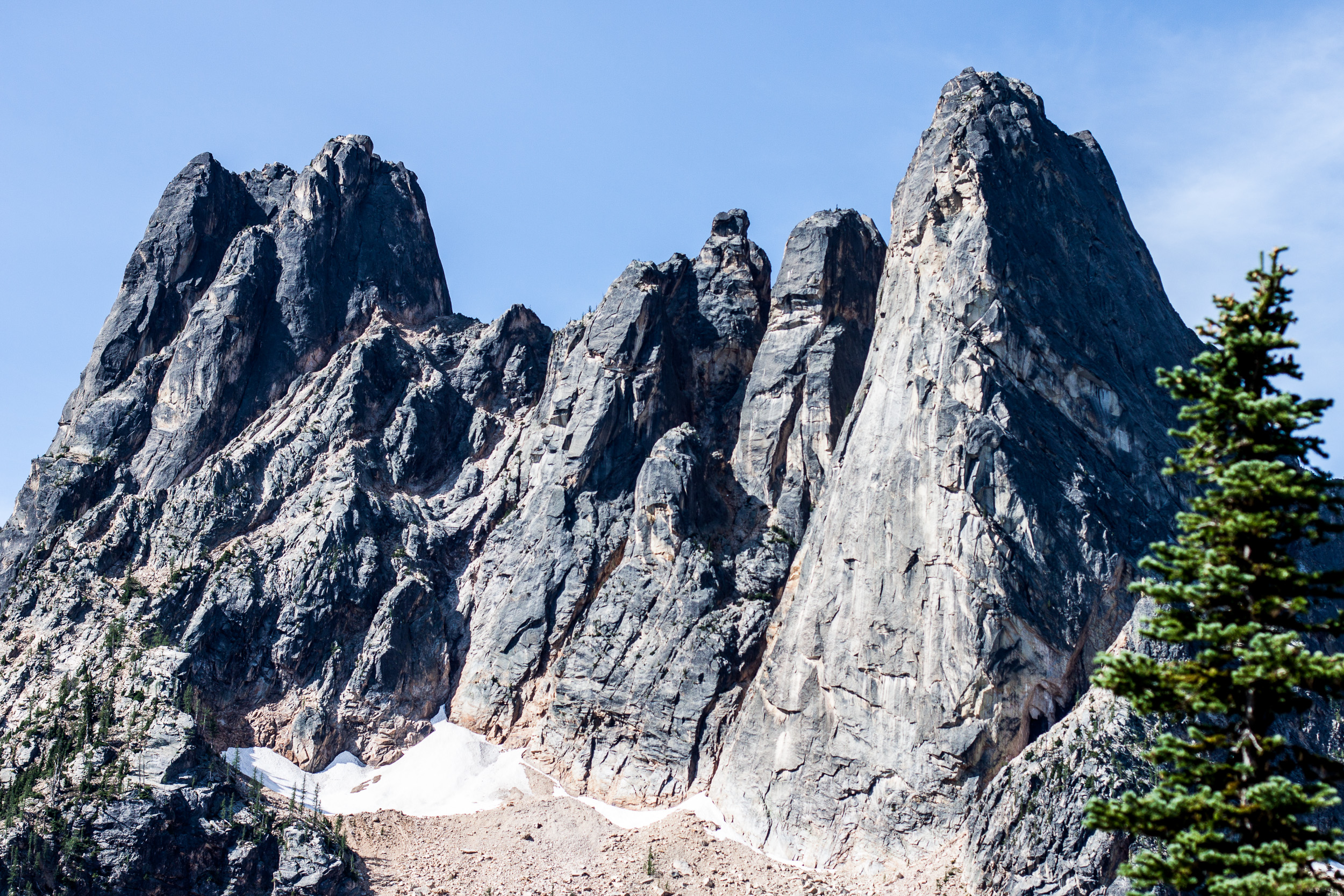
Liberty Bell Group. Lexington Tower slightly right of center.

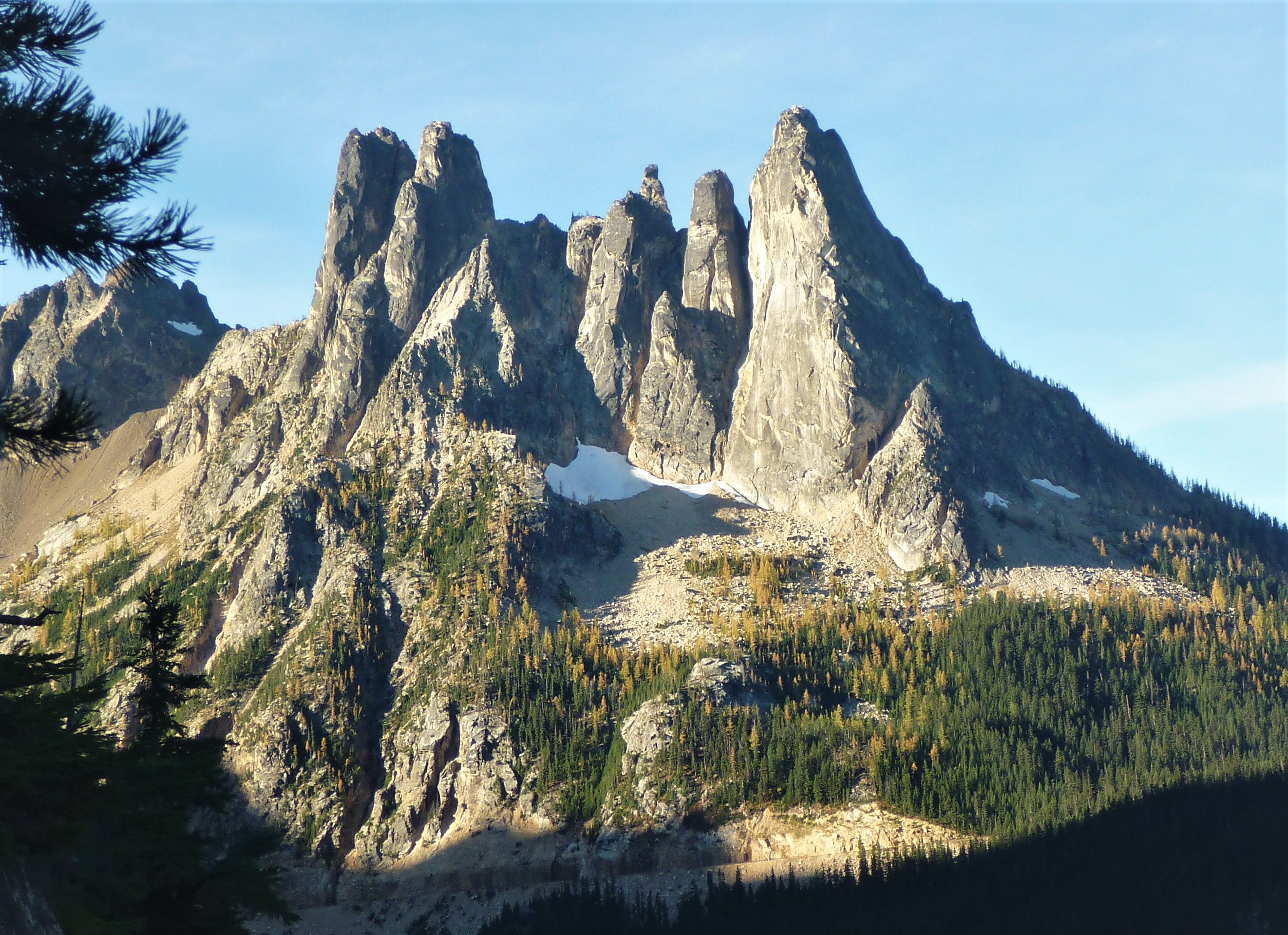
Liberty Bell Group featuring Early Winters Spires (left), Lexington Tower, Concord Tower, Liberty Bell Mountain (right).

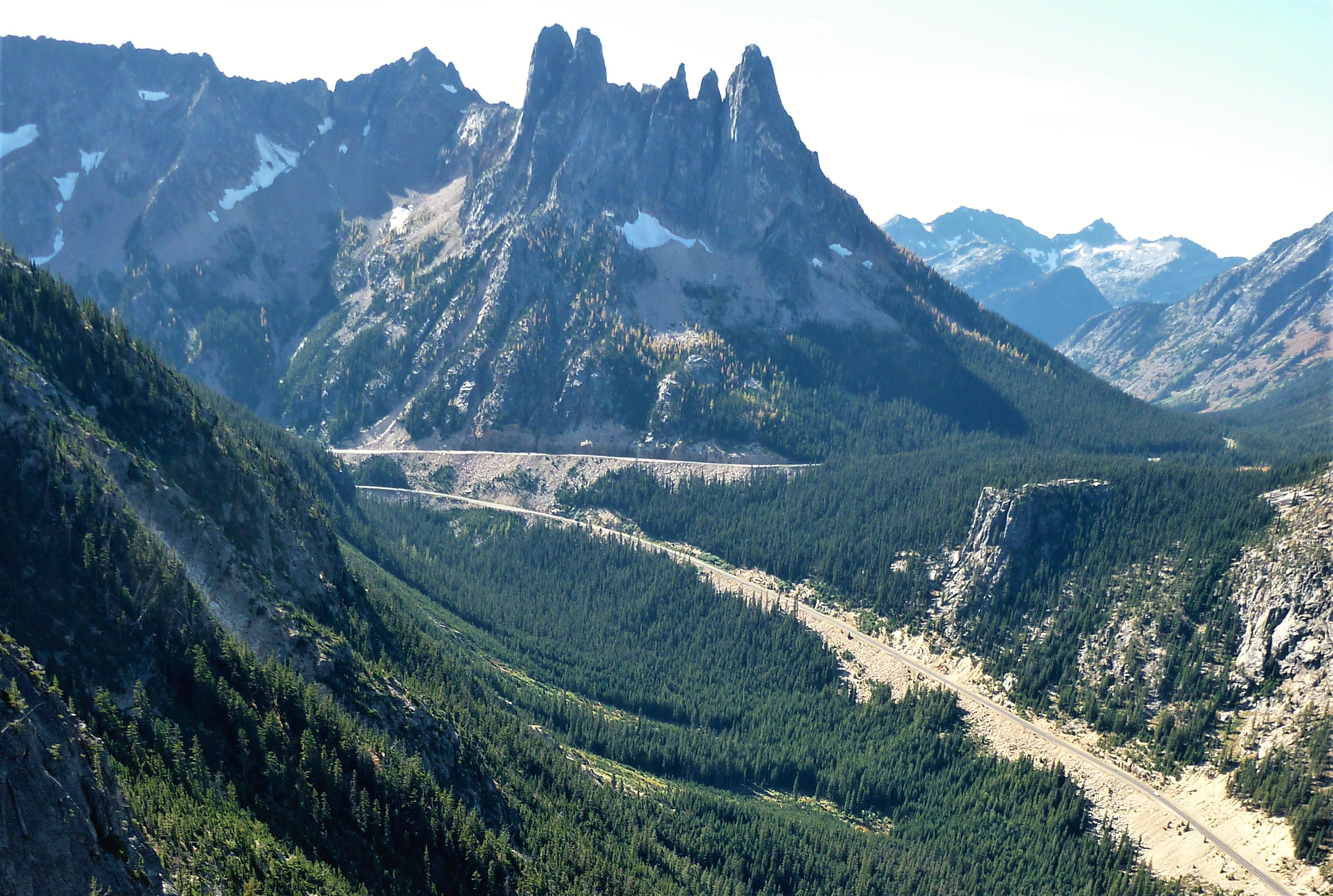
Liberty Bell Group and North Cascades Highway. Lexington Tower centered.

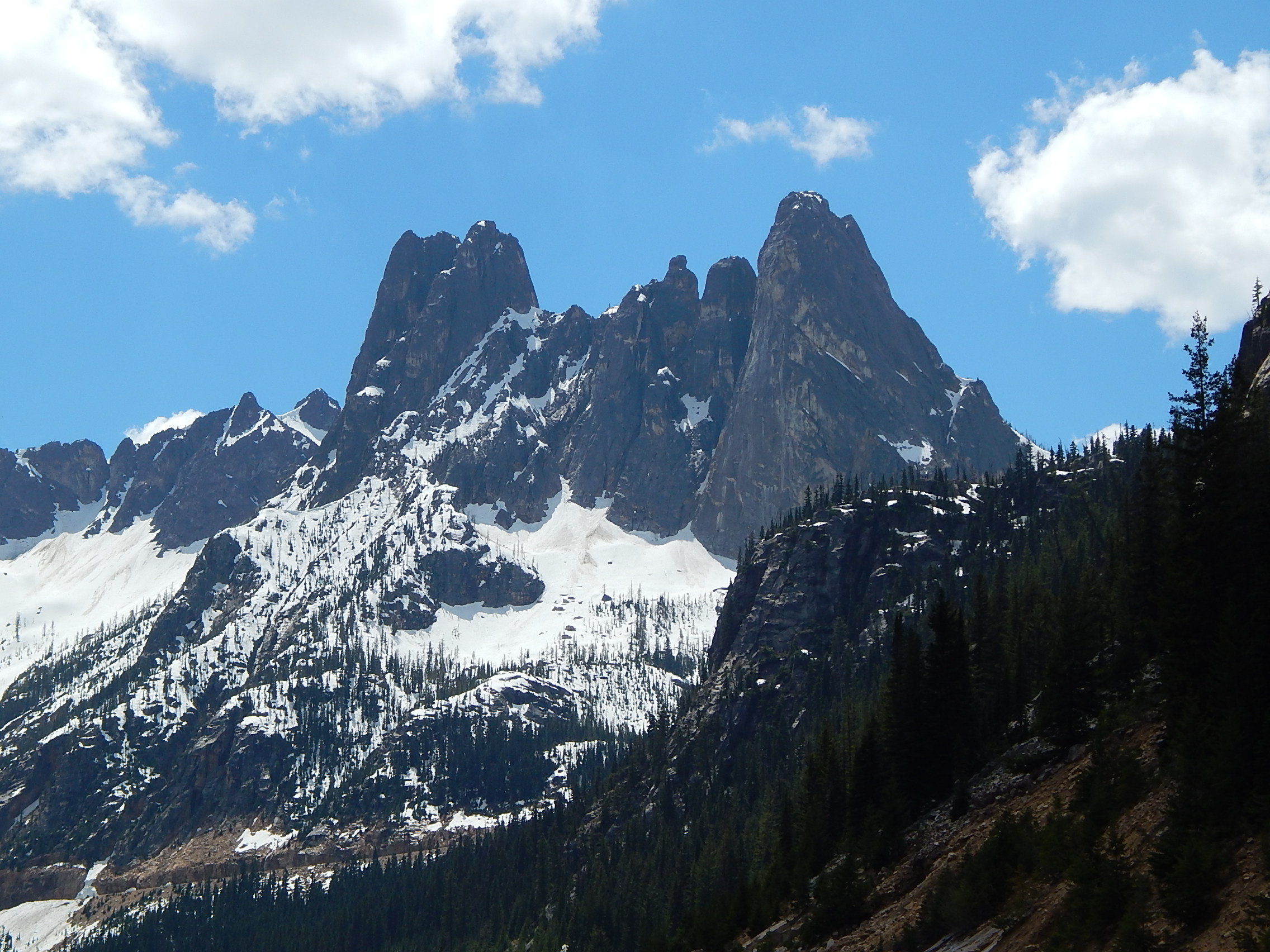
Liberty Bell Group

== See also ==
- Geography of the North Cascades
