= Constitution Crags =

Mountain in Washington (state), United States

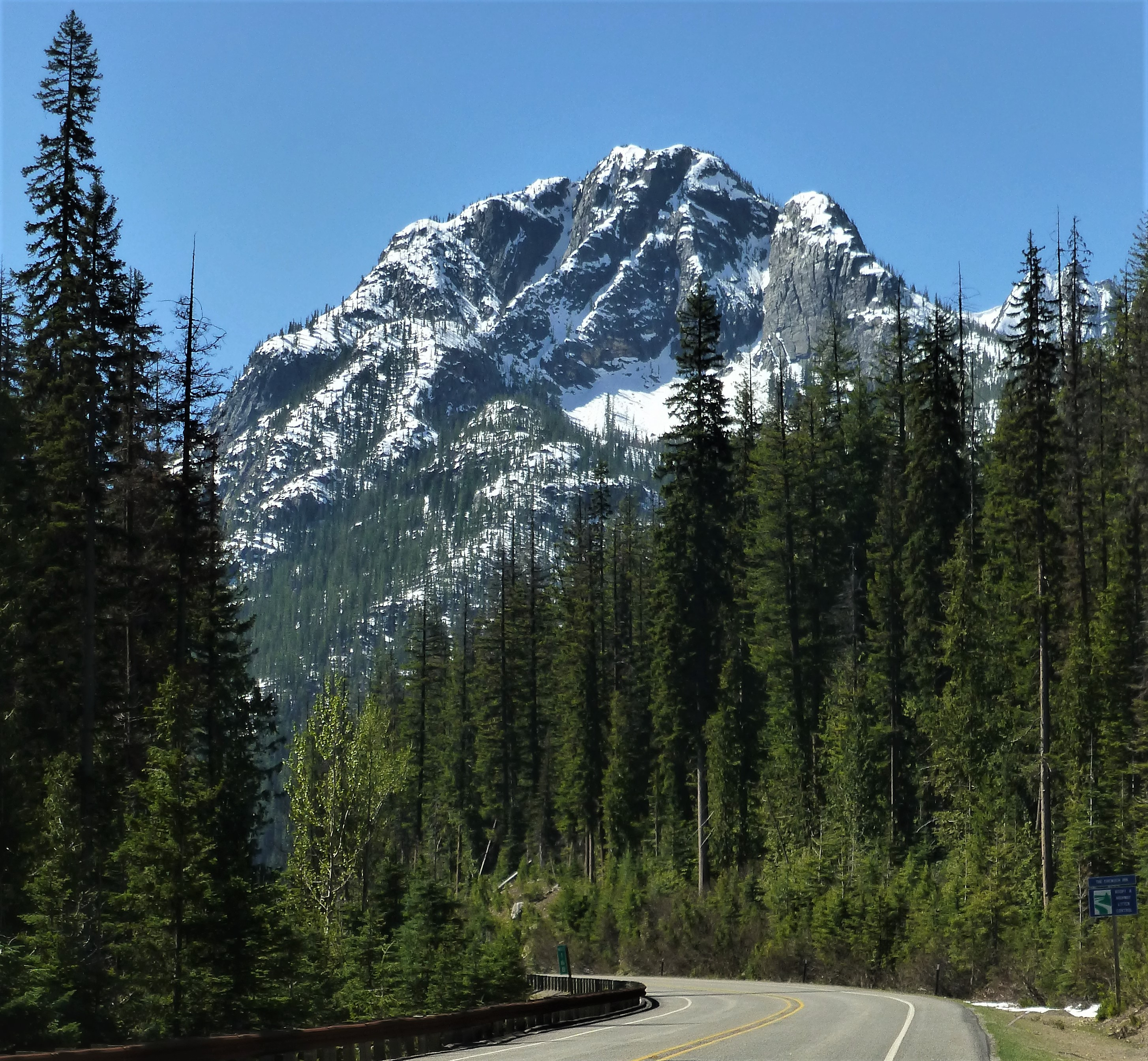
- North aspect, from North Cascades Highway

Highest point
- Elevation: 6,978 ft (2,127 m)
- Prominence: 258 ft (79 m)
- Parent peak: Hinkhouse Peak (7,580 ft)
- Isolation: 0.62 mi (1.00 km)
- Coordinates: 48°32′33″N 120°38′41″W

Geography
- Location within Washington (state) Location within the United States
- Interactive map of Constitution Crags
- Country: United States
- State: Washington
- County: Okanogan
- Parent range: North Cascades
- Topo map: USGS Washington Pass

Geology
- Rock type: Granite

Climbing
- Easiest route: Scrambling class 4

Constitution Crags is a 6,978-foot-elevation summit located in Okanogan County of Washington state. It is part of the Okanogan Range which is a sub-range of the North Cascades. Constitution Crags is situated west of Silver Star Mountain on land administered by the Okanogan–Wenatchee National Forest. The nearest higher neighbor is Hinkhouse Peak, 0.62 mile (1 km) to the southwest. Washington Pass is located over a mile south of Constitution Crags, and the North Cascades Highway traverses below the east face of Constitution Crags. Like many North Cascade peaks, Constitution Crags is more notable for its large, steep rise above local terrain than for its absolute elevation. Topographic relief is significant as the summit rises nearly 2,700 feet (820 meters) above Early Winters Creek in approximately one mile (1.6 km). Precipitation runoff from the peak drains into Early Winters Creek which is a tributary of the Methow River.

== Climate ==
Weather fronts originating in the Pacific Ocean travel east toward the Cascade Mountains. As fronts approach the North Cascades, they are forced upward by the peaks of the Cascade Range (orographic lift), causing them to drop their moisture in the form of rain or snowfall onto the Cascades. As a result, the west side of the North Cascades experiences high precipitation, especially during the winter months in the form of snowfall. Because of maritime influence, snow tends to be wet and heavy, resulting in high avalanche danger. The North Cascades Highway east of Washington Pass has the distinction of being among the top areas in the United States for most avalanche paths per mile of highway. During winter months, weather is usually cloudy, but due to high pressure systems over the Pacific Ocean that intensify during summer months, there is often little or no cloud cover during the summer.

== Geology ==
The North Cascades features some of the most rugged topography in the Cascade Range with craggy peaks, ridges, and deep glacial valleys. Geological events occurring many years ago created the diverse topography and drastic elevation changes over the Cascade Range leading to the various climate differences. These climate differences lead to vegetation variety defining the ecoregions in this area.

The history of the formation of the Cascade Mountains dates back millions of years ago to the late Eocene Epoch. With the North American Plate overriding the Pacific Plate, episodes of volcanic igneous activity persisted. In addition, small fragments of the oceanic and continental lithosphere called terranes created the North Cascades about 50 million years ago. Constitution Crags is carved mostly from granite of the Golden Horn batholith.

During the Pleistocene period dating back over two million years ago, glaciation advancing and retreating repeatedly scoured the landscape leaving deposits of rock debris. The U-shaped cross section of the river valleys is a result of recent glaciation. Uplift and faulting in combination with glaciation have been the dominant processes which have created the tall peaks and deep valleys of the North Cascades area.

== Gallery ==
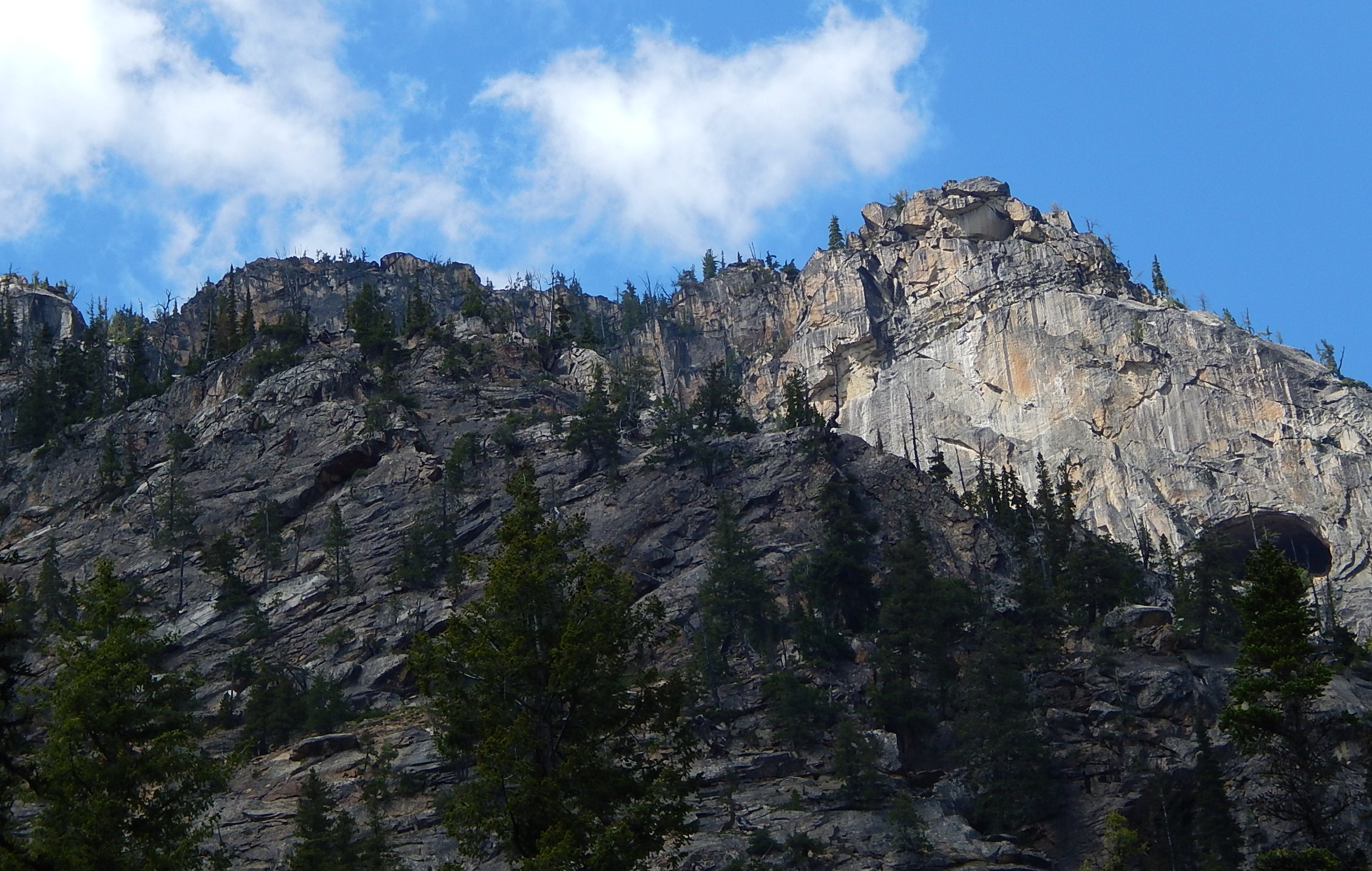
Constitution Crags

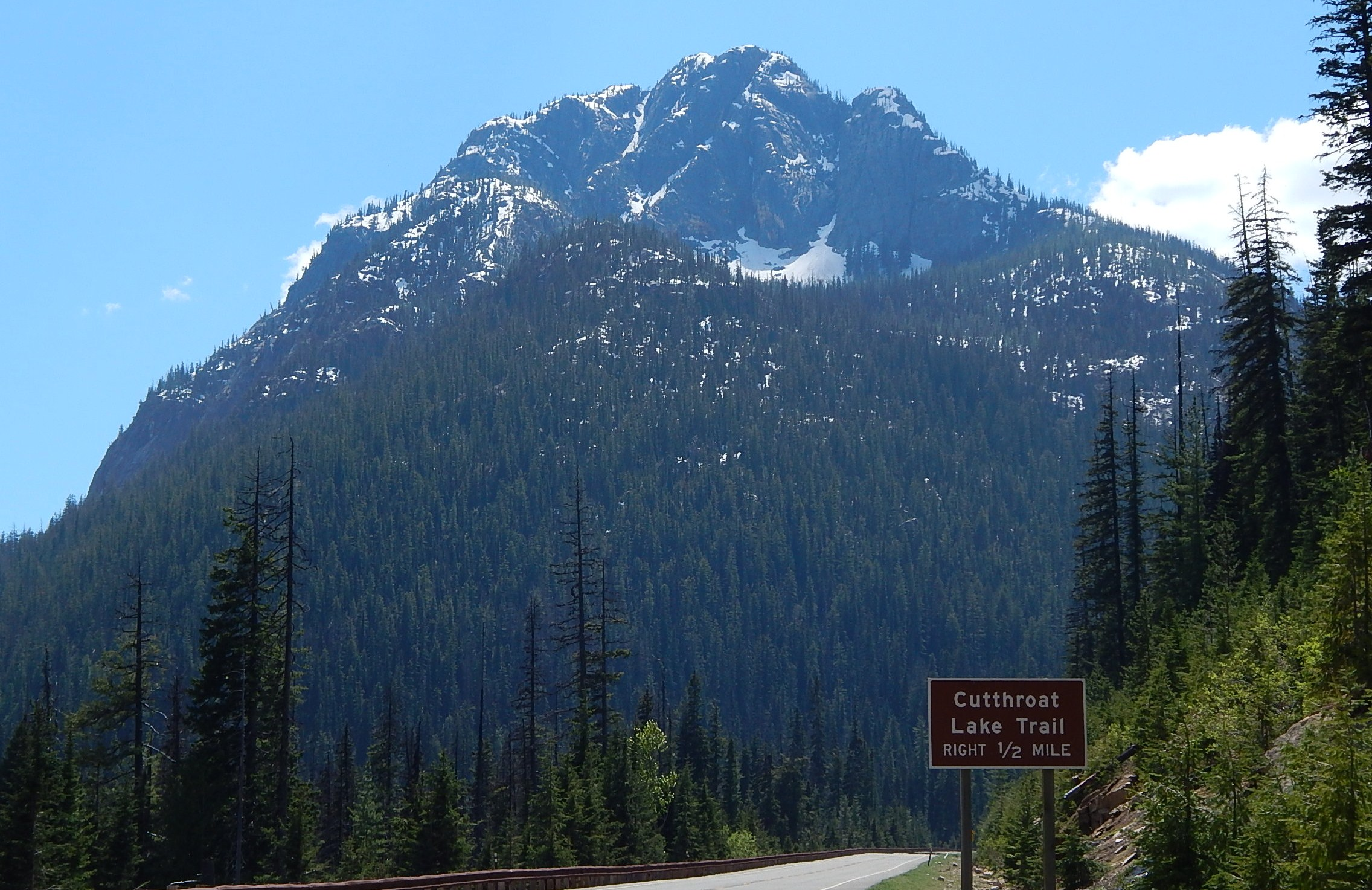
Constitution Crags from North Cascades Highway

== See also ==
- Geography of the North Cascades
- Geology of the Pacific Northwest
