= Liberty Crack =

Rock climbing route in the Cascade Mountains, Washington, U.S.

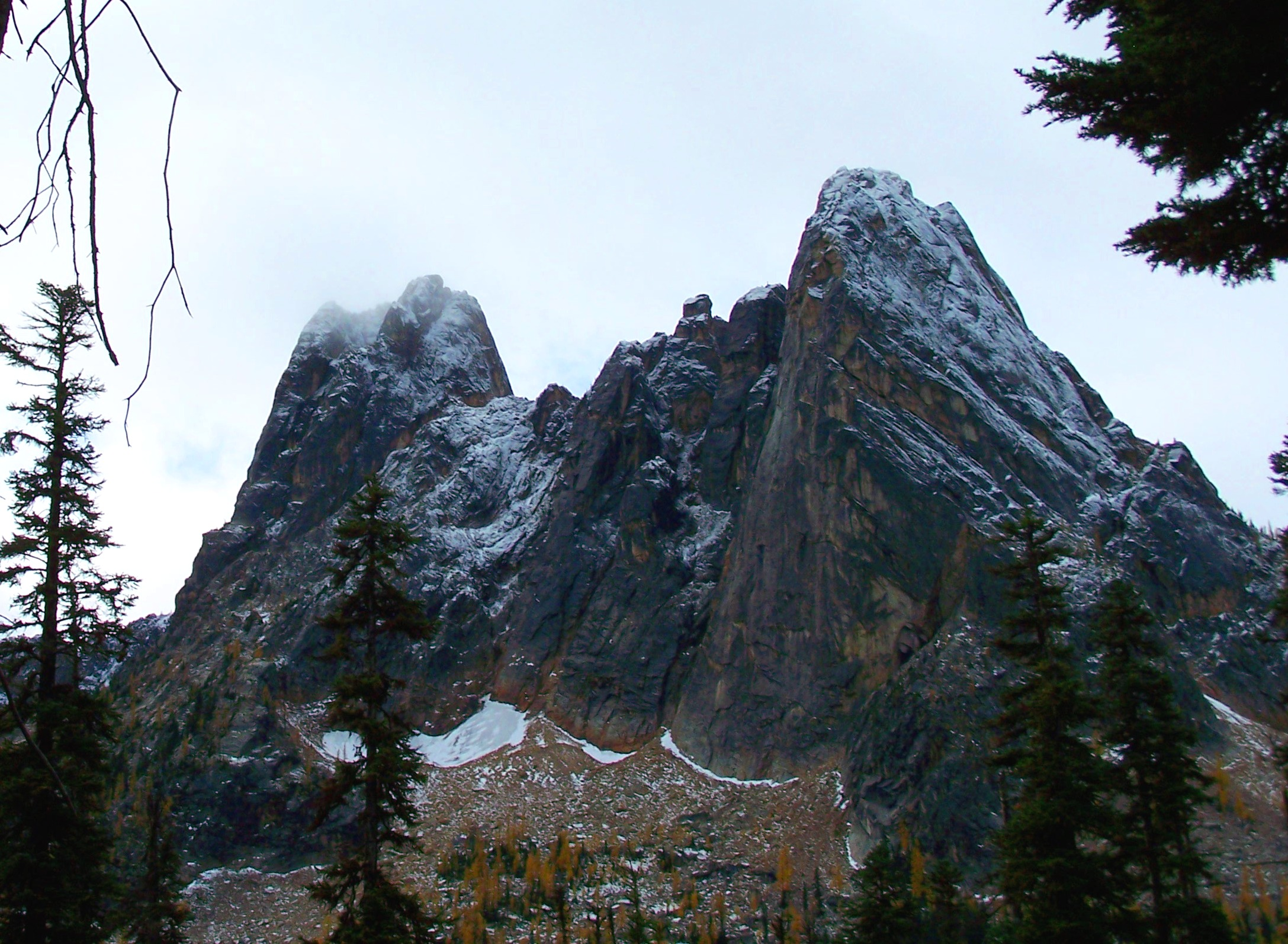
- Liberty Bell Mountain from 5477 ft. elevation Washington Pass on North Cascades Highway
- Location: Liberty Bell Mountain, Washington (state), United States
- Coordinates: 48.51560°N 120.6567°W
- Climbing area: Washington Pass
- Route type: Trad, Aid, Alpine
- Vertical gain: 1200 feet
- Pitches: 12
- Technical grade: 5.11- C2
- NCCS grade: V
- First ascent: Steve Marts, Fred Stanley, and Don McPherson July 16–18, 1965.

The Liberty Crack is a technical rock climbing route on Liberty Bell Mountain near Washington Pass and is featured in Fifty Classic Climbs of North America.
