= Swaram Creek =

Stream in Washington, U.S.

Coordinates: 48°05′25″N 120°01′03″W

Swaram Creek is a stream in the U.S. state of Washington. It is a tributary to the Methow River.

The creek was formerly called Squaw Creek. The original name had caused a degree of controversy over its name due to the use of the slur squaw. The present name Swaram is a language derived from a Native American language meaning "torch light fishing at nigh".
