= Methow River =

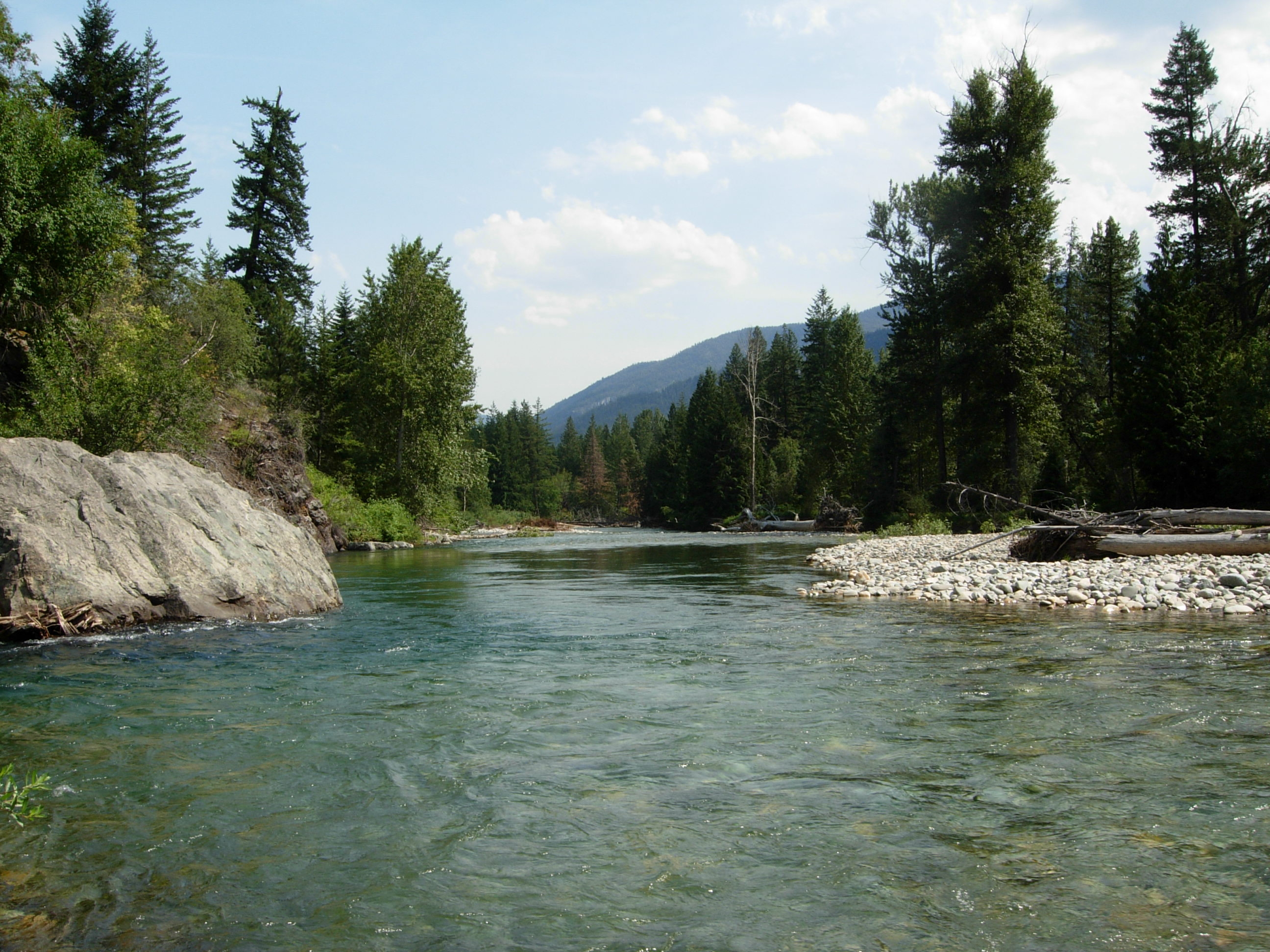
- The Methow River at Mazama

- Location of the mouth of the Methow River in Washington Methow River (the United States)
- Native name: Buttlemuleemauch

Location
- Country: United States
- State: Washington
- Region: Okanogan County
- Cities: Winthrop, Twisp, Pateros

Physical characteristics
- Source: Cascade Range
  - location: Methow Pass
  - coordinates: 48°35′9″N 120°44′44″W
  - elevation: 5,677 ft (1,730 m)
- Mouth: Columbia River
  - location: Pateros
  - coordinates: 48°3′2″N 119°53′43″W
  - elevation: 784 ft (239 m)
- Length: 80 mi (130 km)
- Basin size: 1,825 sq mi (4,730 km^{2})
- Discharge
  - location: mouth
  - average: 1,522 cu ft/s (43.1 m^{3}/s)
  - minimum: 150 cu ft/s (4.2 m^{3}/s)
  - maximum: 27,200 cu ft/s (770 m^{3}/s)

Basin features
- Tributaries
  - left: Lost River, Chewuch River
  - right: Early Winters Creek, Twisp River, Swaram Creek

The Methow River (/ˈmɛthaʊ/ MET-how) is a tributary of the Columbia River in northern Washington in the United States. The river's 1,890-square-mile (4,900 km^{2}) watershed drains the eastern North Cascades, with a population of about 5,000 people. The Methow's watershed is characterized by relatively pristine habitats, as much of the river basin is located in national forests and wildernesses. Many tributaries drain the large Pasayten Wilderness. An earlier economy based on agriculture is giving way to one based on recreation and tourism.

The Methow is inhabited by a population of steelhead, Chinook salmon, bull trout, rainbow trout, cutthroat trout, mountain whitefish, and coho salmon. This makes it a locally popular sport fishery.

== History ==
The river was named after the Methow Native Americans (today part of the Confederated Tribes of the Colville Indian Reservation). The name "Methow" comes from the Okanagan placename /mətxʷú/, meaning "sunflower (seeds)". The Native American name for the river was Buttlemuleemauch, meaning "salmon falls river". In 1841 the Wilkes Expedition named the river "Barrier River". Alexander Ross said the native name was Buttle-mule-emauch. In 1811 David Thompson met the tribe living along the river and wrote their name as Smeetheowe. In 1853 George Gibbs called the river Methow or Barrier.

== Course ==
The Methow River, along with its tributaries the Twisp River, Cedar Creek, and Early Winters Creek, originates in a cluster of high mountains including Golden Horn, Tower Mountain, Cutthroat Peak, Snagtooth Ridge, Kangaroo Ridge, Early Winters Spires, and Liberty Bell Mountain. Several mountain passes are associated with the Methow River and its tributaries, such as Methow Pass and Twisp Pass. State Route 20 utilizes Washington Pass and Rainy Pass, also in the general areas of headwater streams.

The Pacific Crest Trail follows the uppermost reach of the Methow River, until the river turns east, flowing into the Methow Valley near Mazama. Along the way, it collects the tributary streams of Robinson Creek and Lost River. In the Methow Valley, between Mazama and Winthrop, the Methow River is joined by Early Winters Creek, Cedar Creek, Goat Creek, and Wolf Creek. The Chewuch River joins at Winthrop. One of the Methow's larger tributaries, the Chewuch River, and its many tributaries drain large parts of the Pasayten Wilderness to the north. One of its headwater streams, Cathedral Creek, reaches nearly to British Columbia, Canada.

The Methow Valley continues below Winthrop to Twisp, where the Methow River is joined by another important tributary, the Twisp River. Flowing from the west, the Twisp River drains the mountains south of Washington Pass as well as the eastern slopes of Sawtooth Ridge, a major mountain range with some of Washington state's highest peaks (such as Star Peak and Mount Bigelow).

Downriver from Twisp, the Methow River passes by the communities of Carlton and Methow, receiving several minor tributaries, before joining the Columbia River at Pateros. This part of the Columbia is the impoundment of Wells Dam, a lake known as Lake Pateros.

== Ecology and conservation ==
In Robertson v. Methow Valley Citizens Council (a 1989 Stevens decision) the Rehnquist Court concluded

that NEPA does not require a fully developed plan detailing what steps will be taken to mitigate adverse environmental impacts and does not require a "worst case analysis." In addition, we hold that the Forest Service has adopted a permissible interpretation of its own regulations.

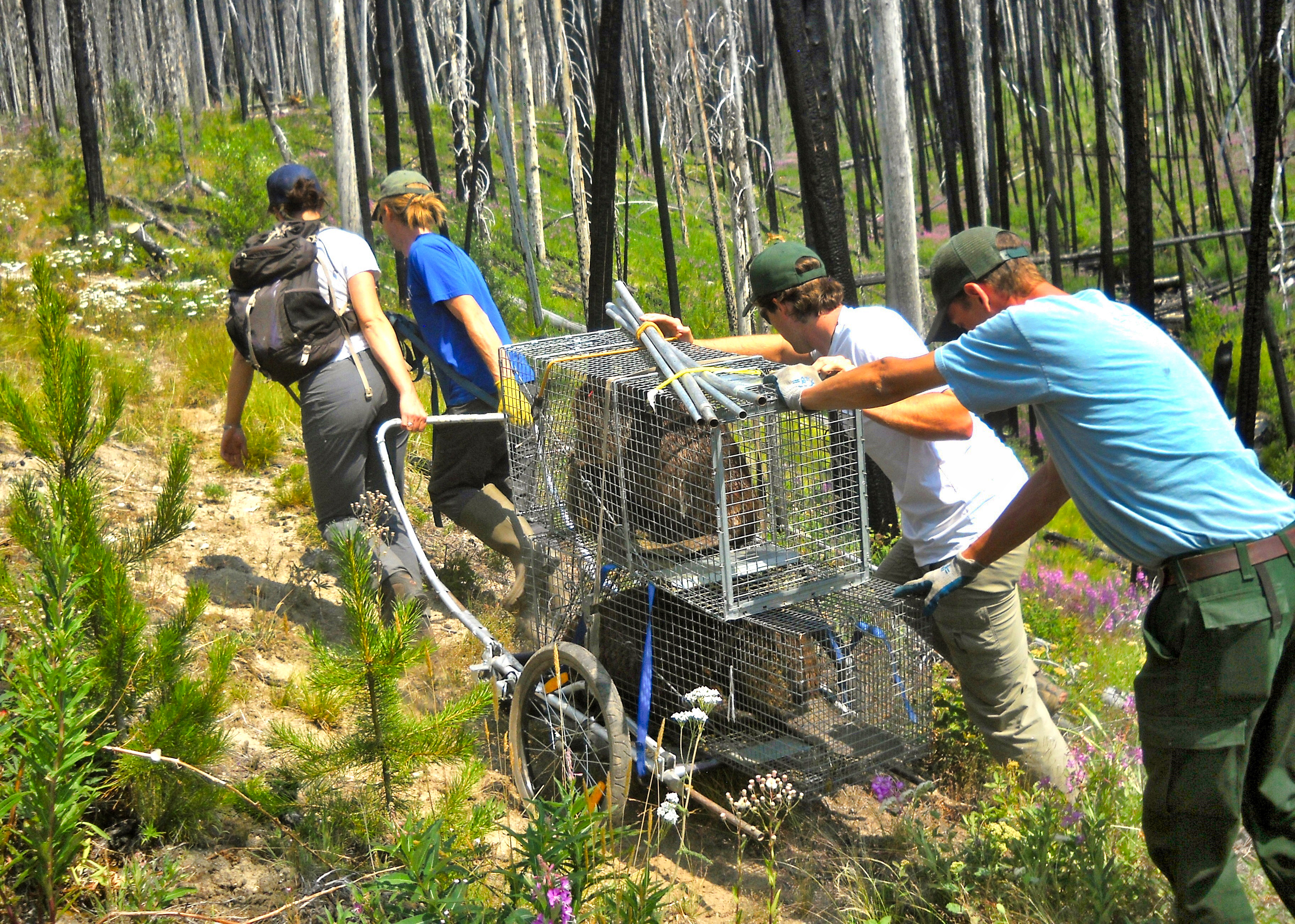
Beavers being reintroduced along the Methow River, in 2014

Since 2007, the Methow Beaver Project has translocated over 240 "problem" beaver (Castor canadensis) into 51 suitable sites in various headwater tributaries of the Methow watershed. The sites were selected using satellite imagery and computer modelling. Translocation success was optimized by putting pairs of beavers together in man-made lodges that tended to keep them in the desired sites so that the beaver ponds would store rainwater, trap sediment and repair channel incision/erosion, serve as nurseries for salmonids and other species, and act as firebreaks in the fire-prone eastern Cascades. One beaver that was PIT (passive integrated transponder) tagged and released in the upper part of the Methow Valley swam to the mouth of the Methow River, then up the Okanogan River almost to the Canada–US border, a journey of 120 miles (190 km). The Methow Beaver Project is a partnership between the U.S. Forest Service, the Washington Department of Fish and Wildlife and the Methow Salmon Recovery Foundation. Beaver were nearly exterminated in the Methow watershed by the early 1900s by fur trappers.

== See also ==
- List of rivers of Washington (state)
- Tributaries of the Columbia River
- Methow, Washington
