= Richard McGowan =

American mountain climber and explorer (1933–2007)

Richard McGowan (July 12, 1933 – February 27, 2007) was an American explorer, mountaineer, and entrepreneur, who helped start the modern adventure travel industry. He is best remembered today for his Mount Everest expedition in 1955, during which he climbed the Khumbu Ice Fall, thus becoming the first American to set foot on Mount Everest.

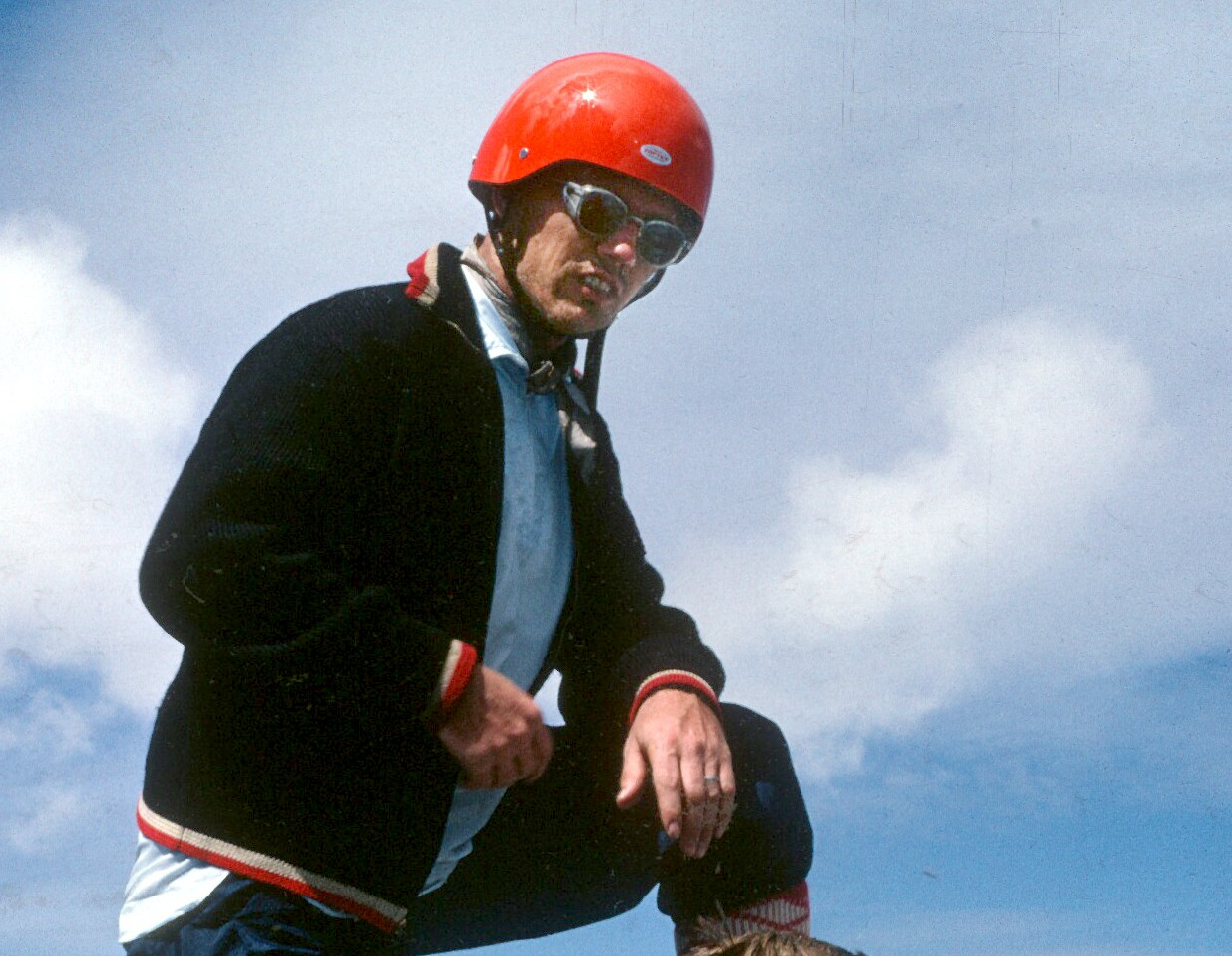
Dick McGowan, Sahale Summit 8-66.jpg

McGowan was a key figure in the development of modern outdoor gear, and was the first employee of Recreation Equipment Incorporated (REI). In the 1960s and early 1970s he owned a group of stores in the northwest that sold climbing and ski gear named The Alpine Hut. He was managing partner of the outfitter Mountain Travel from 1976 to 1992. He left the firm after the merger that created Mountain Travel Sobek.

== Expeditions ==
- Team member on 11 major expeditions, including the International Everest expedition in 1955. On this expedition, Dick was the first American to set foot on Mount Everest itself, though the team did not reach the summit.
- First ascents of major peaks in Alaska, Washington, Canada's Yukon and in Pakistan's Karakorum (K-1).
- Ten years as chief guide on Mount Rainier.
- Led the first guided climb on Denali, the highest peak in North America.

== Personal life ==
McGowan grew up in Seattle, and graduated with a bachelor's degree in geography from the University of Washington. McGowan is survived by his wife and longtime business partner Louise, and children Richard Jr., Devi and Kili.

McGowan spent many years as a director of the American Himalayan Foundation, where he served with longtime friend Sir Edmund Hillary.
