= Early Winters Spires =

Rock formations in North Cascade Range in Washington, United States

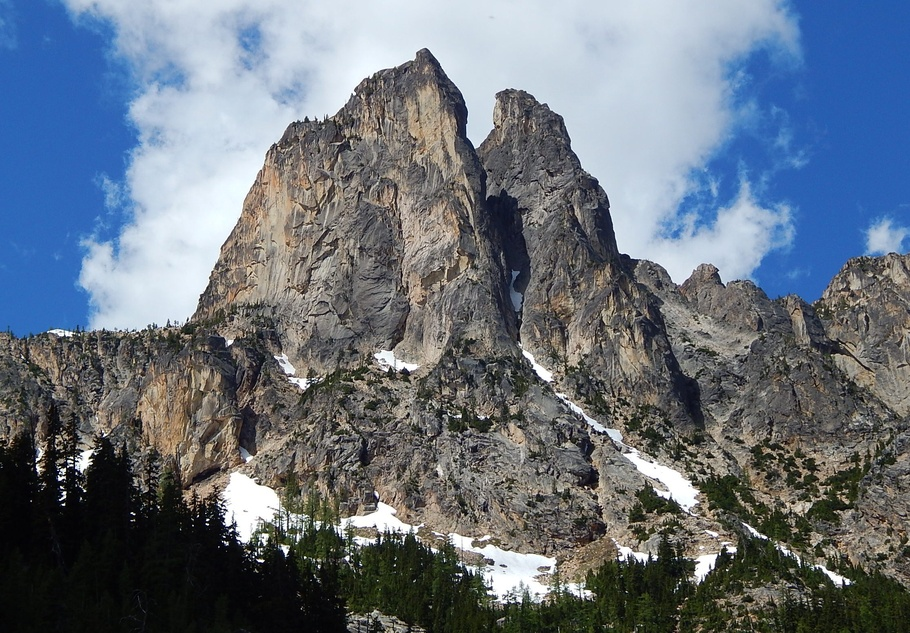
- Early Winters Spires

Highest point
- Elevation: 7,807 ft (2,380 m)
- Prominence: 647 ft (200 m)
- Coordinates: 48°30′44″N 120°39′19″W

Geography
- Location within Washington (state) Location within the United States
- Interactive map of Early Winters Spires
- Location: Okanogan County, Washington
- Parent range: Cascade Range
- Topo map: USGS Washington Pass

Geology
- Rock type: (Rapakivi texture) granite

The Early Winters Spires are two rock formations in the Liberty Bell Group of the North Cascade Range, set between Liberty Bell Mountain and Blue Lake Peak in Washington state, United States. The two spires (North and South) are virtually one granite massif, split by a deep cleft formed by jointing and erosion. The shapes of these spires are attributed to ice wedging, cleaving along master joints by soil acids, and perpetual weathering.

== North Early Winters Spire ==
Elevation: 7,760 ft / 2,366 m

First ascent: May 28, 1950. Wesley Grande, Pete Schoening, and Dick Widrig.

== South Early Winters Spire ==
Elevation: 7,807 ft / 2,380 m

First ascent: July 20, 1937. Kenneth Adam, Raffi Bedayn, and W. Kenneth Davis were credited in their report of first ascent however, only Bedayn and Neil Ruge appear in the summit register.

== Climate ==
Early Winters Spires are located in the marine west coast climate zone of western North America. Most weather fronts originate in the Pacific Ocean, and travel northeast toward the Cascade Mountains. As fronts approach the North Cascades, they are forced upward by the peaks of the Cascade Range (Orographic lift), causing them to drop their moisture in the form of rain or snowfall onto the Cascades. As a result, the west side of the North Cascades experiences high precipitation, especially during the winter months in the form of snowfall. During winter months, weather is usually cloudy, but, due to high pressure systems over the Pacific Ocean that intensify during summer months, there is often little or no cloud cover during the summer. Because of maritime influence, snow tends to be wet and heavy, resulting in high avalanche danger. Precipitation runoff from the northeast side of the spires drains into Early Winters Creek which is a tributary of the Methow River, whereas the southwest slope drains into a tributary of the Chelan River.

== Geology ==
The North Cascades features some of the most rugged topography in the Cascade Range with craggy peaks, ridges, and deep glacial valleys. The history of the formation of the Cascade Mountains dates back millions of years ago to the late Eocene Epoch. With the North American Plate overriding the Pacific Plate, episodes of volcanic igneous activity persisted. In addition, small fragments of the oceanic and continental lithosphere called terranes created the North Cascades about 50 million years ago.

During the Pleistocene period dating back over two million years ago, glaciation advancing and retreating repeatedly scoured the landscape leaving deposits of rock debris. The U-shaped cross section of the river valleys is a result of recent glaciation. Uplift and faulting in combination with glaciation have been the dominant processes which have created the tall peaks and deep valleys of the North Cascades area.

== History ==
On May 10, 2025, three climbers on North Early Winters Spire were killed in an accident that is thought to have been caused by the failure of a shared anchor point. A fourth climber, who fell with the rest of the group, was severely injured but able to descend from the North Spire, reach his vehicle, and drive 42 miles (68 km) west to Newhalem to call for medical assistance. All four climbers were from the Seattle area.

== Gallery ==
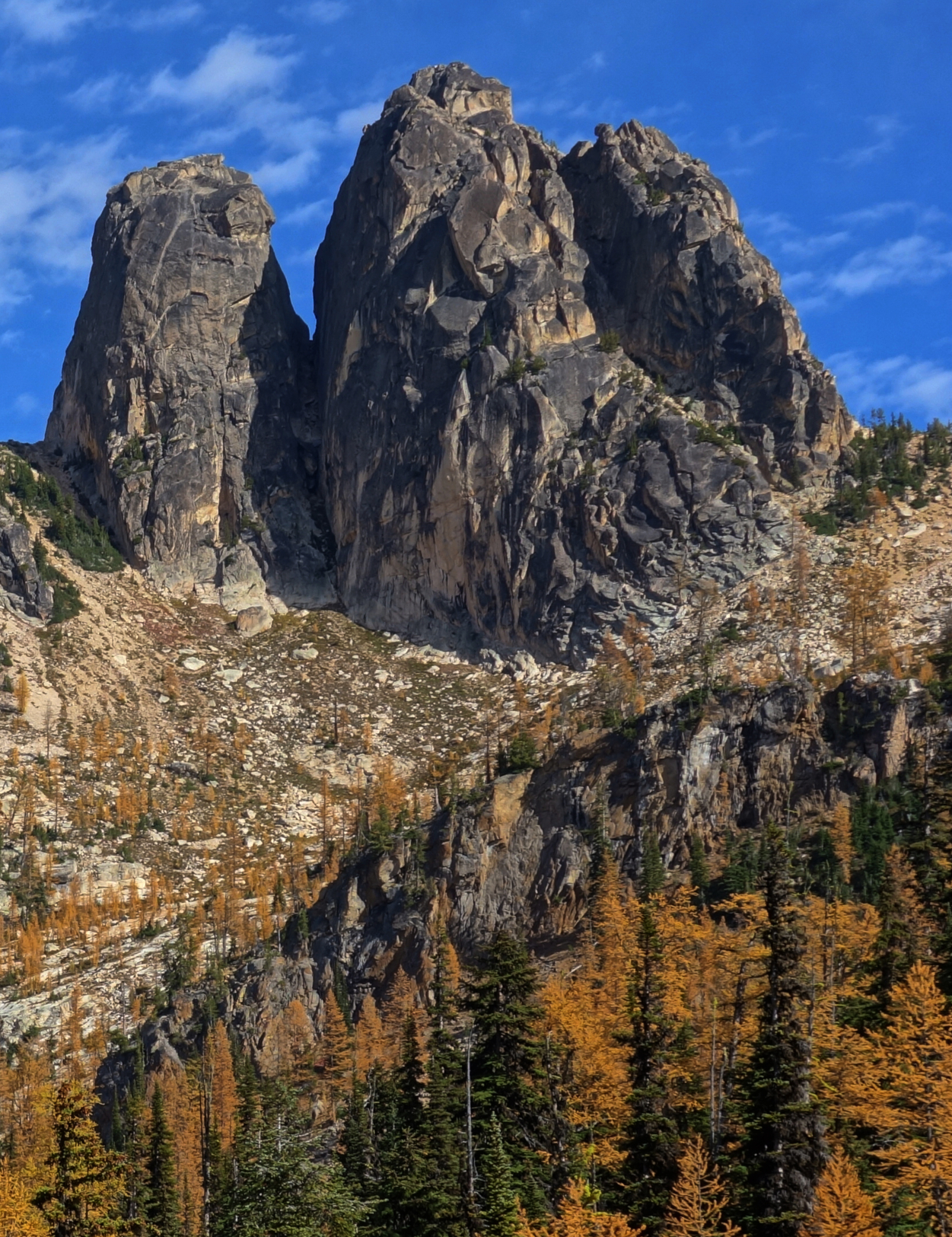
The two spires (north on the left)

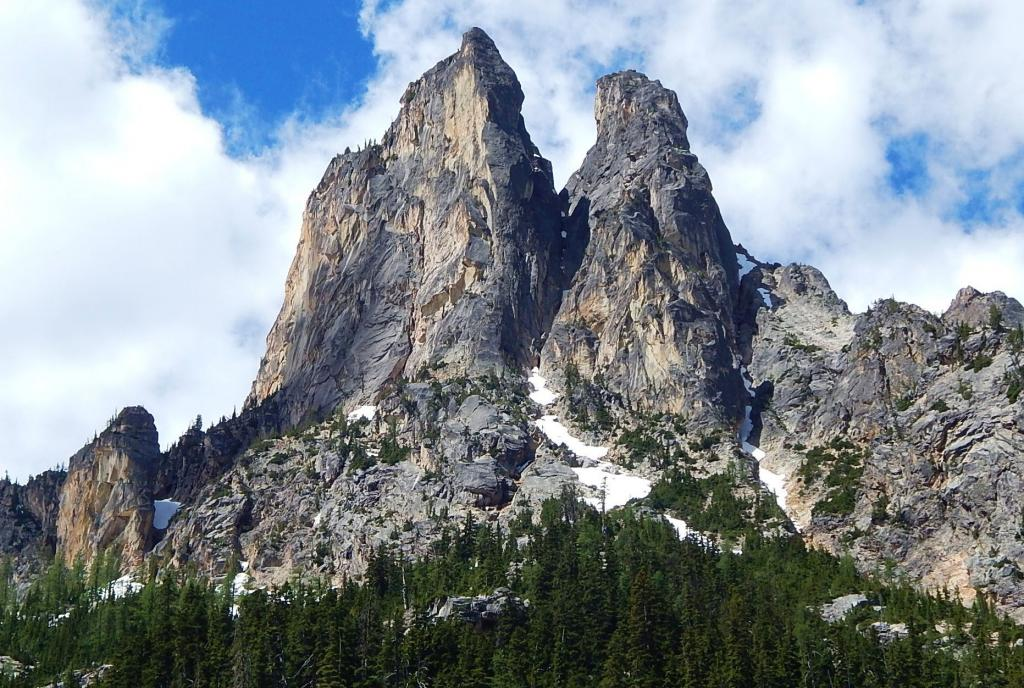
