= Liberty Bell Mountain =

Mountain in Washington (state), United States

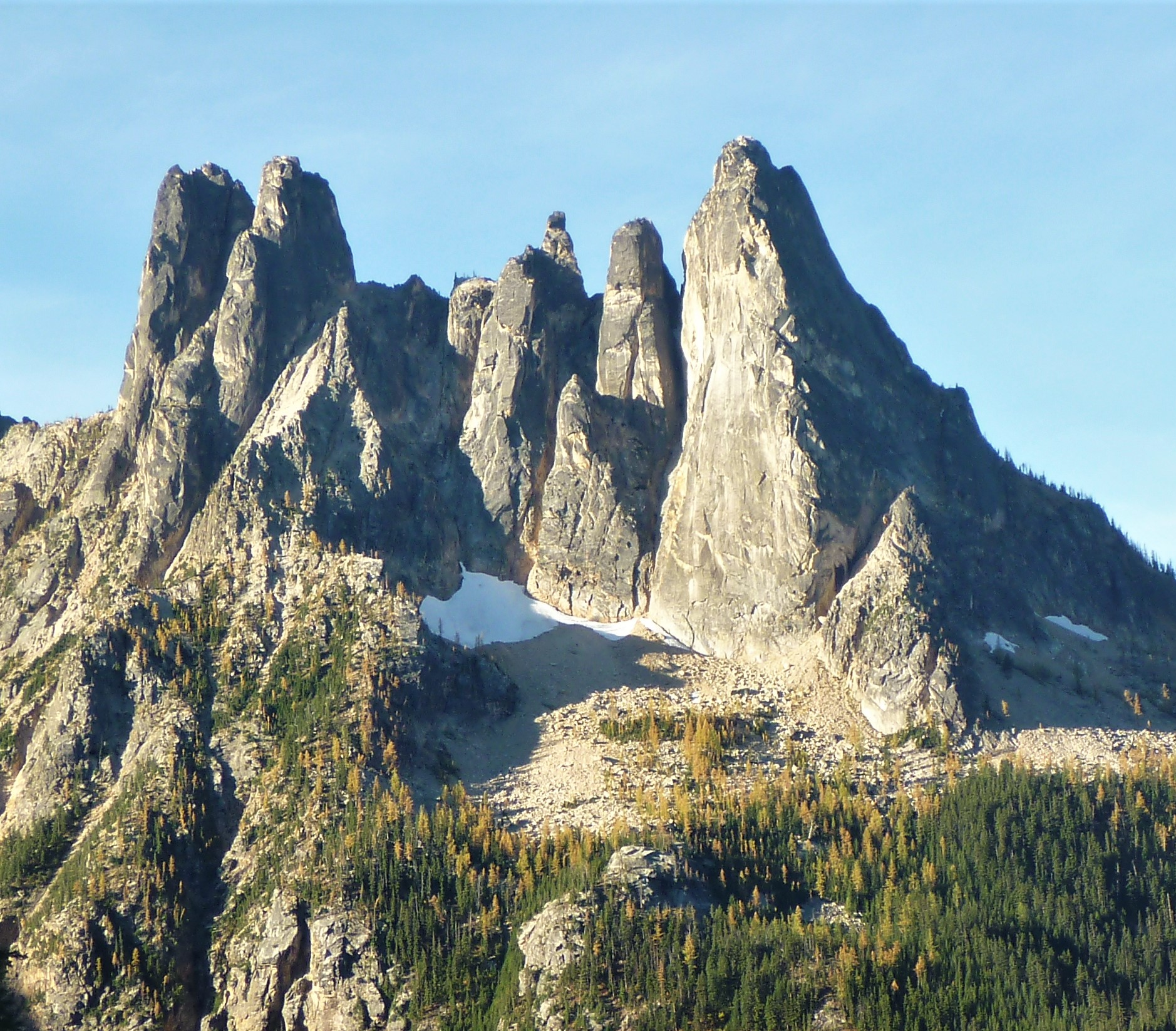
- Liberty Bell Mountain (right) viewed from the east

Highest point
- Elevation: 7,720+ ft (2,350+ m) NGVD 29
- Prominence: 200 ft (60 m)
- Coordinates: 48°30′55″N 120°39′28″W

Geography
- Location: near Washington Pass, Chelan / Okanogan counties, Washington, U.S.
- Parent range: North Cascades
- Topo map: USGS Washington Pass

Geology
- Rock type: Granite

Climbing
- First ascent: 1946, Fred Beckey, Jerry O'Neil, and Charles Welsh
- Easiest route: class 5.6 The Beckey Route

Liberty Bell Mountain is located in the North Cascades, State of Washington, United States, approximately one mile south of Washington Pass on the North Cascades Highway. Liberty Bell is the most northern spire of the Liberty Bell Group, a group of spires that also includes Concord Tower, Lexington Tower, North Early Winters Spire, and South Early Winters Spire.

It is a well-known peak in Washington, although it lacks high prominence and elevation. It is well known for having high-quality alpine climbing, with a short approach since the completion of The Washington Pass Highway. A mixture of high-quality granite and difficult rock has made it a very popular weekend climbing area. Routes range from 5.6 class and grade II to 5.12a class, and grade IV to V.

== Rock climbing routes ==
Liberty Bell Mountain has 18 named traditional climbing routes. Liberty Crack is featured in Fifty Classic Climbs of North America. The first ascent was on September 27, 1946, by Fred Beckey, Jerry O’Neil, and Charles Welsh by way of what is now known as the Beckey route.

Climbing Routes on Liberty Bell Mountain

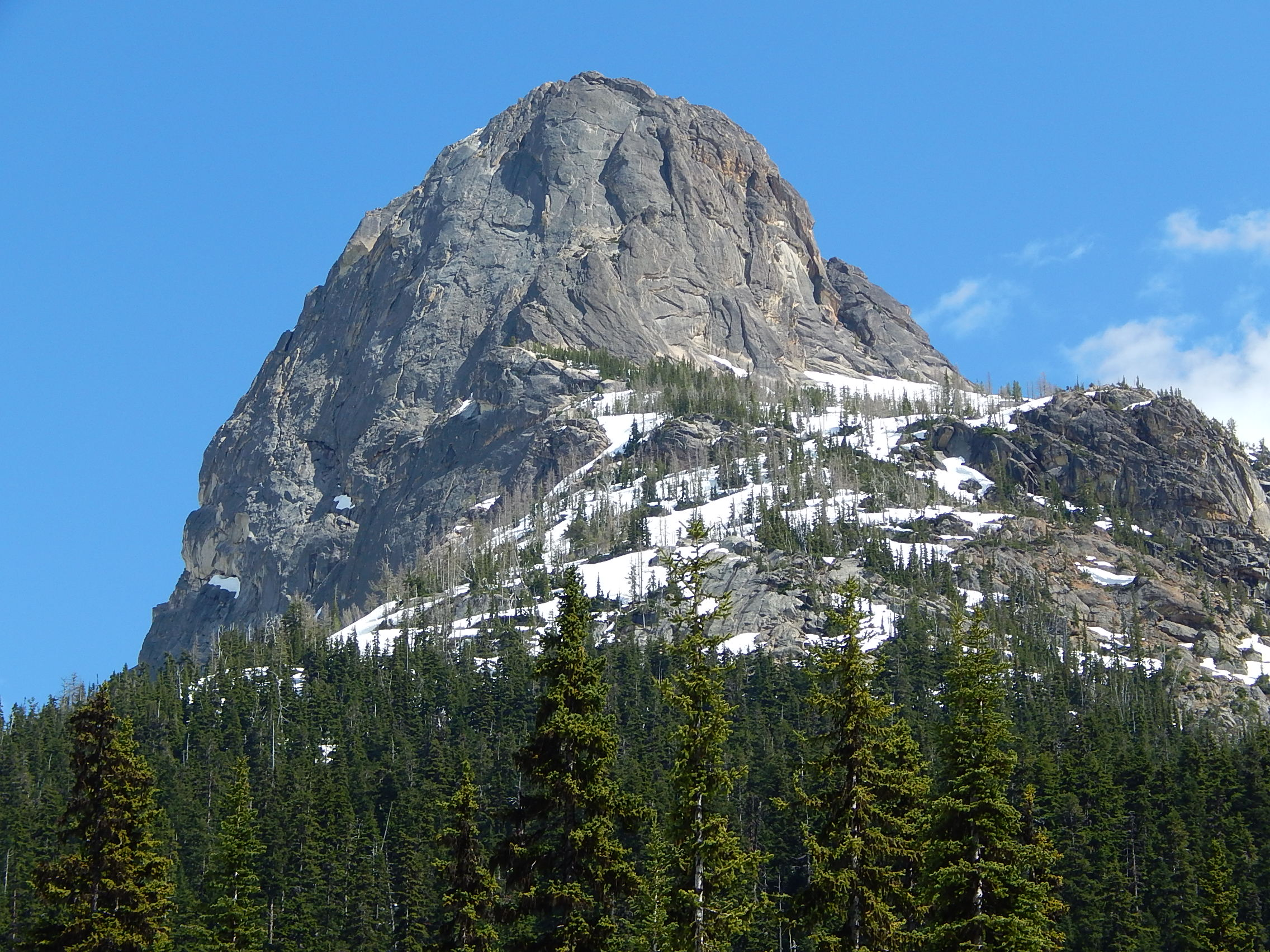
Liberty Bell Mountain, NW Face

- Beckey Route (SW Face) - class 5.6 - 3 pitches
- Freedom or Death - class 5.12a - 4 pitches
- A Slave To Liberty - class 5.13- - 11 pitches
- NW Face - class 5.9 - 5 pitches
- Serpentine Crack - class 5.11 - 4 pitches
- The Girl Next Door - class 5.9- - 3 pitches
- Rapple Grapple - class 5.8 - 4 pitches
- Overexposure - class 5.8 - 2 pitches
- Freedom Rider - class 5.10d - 14 pitches
- Liberty Crack - class 5.11a - 12 pitches
- Liberty Crack Free - class 5.13b - 12 pitches
- Thin Red Line (Free Version) - class 5.12 - 11 pitches
- Liberty and Injustice for All - class 5.12 - 5 pitches
- The Independence Route - class 5.12a - 12 pitches
- NW Face Var. (Remsberg Variation) - class 5.10d - 5 pitches
- Live Free or Die! - class 5.11c - 11 pitches

== Climate ==
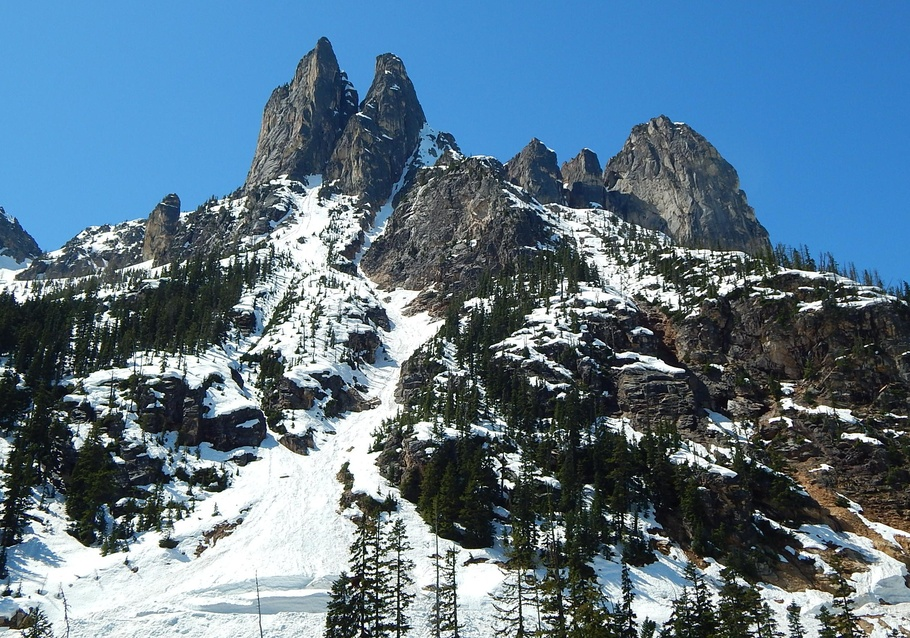
Liberty Bell Group avalanche chute

Weather fronts originating in the Pacific Ocean travel northeast toward the Cascade Mountains. As fronts approach the North Cascades, they are forced upward by the peaks of the Cascade Range (Orographic lift), causing them to drop their moisture in the form of rain or snowfall onto the Cascades. As a result, the west side of the North Cascades experiences high precipitation, especially during the winter months in the form of snowfall. During the winter months, weather is usually cloudy, but, due to high-pressure systems over the Pacific Ocean that intensify during the summer months, there is often little or no cloud covering the summer. Because of maritime influence, snow tends to be wet and heavy, resulting in high avalanche danger. The North Cascades Highway east of Washington Pass has the distinction of being among the top areas in the United States for most avalanche paths per mile of highway. The months of July through September offer the most favorable weather for viewing or climbing Liberty Bell Mountain.

== Geology ==
The North Cascades features some of the most rugged topography in the Cascade Range with craggy peaks, ridges, and deep glacial valleys. Geological events occurring many years ago created diverse topography and drastic elevation changes over the Cascade Range leading to various climate differences.

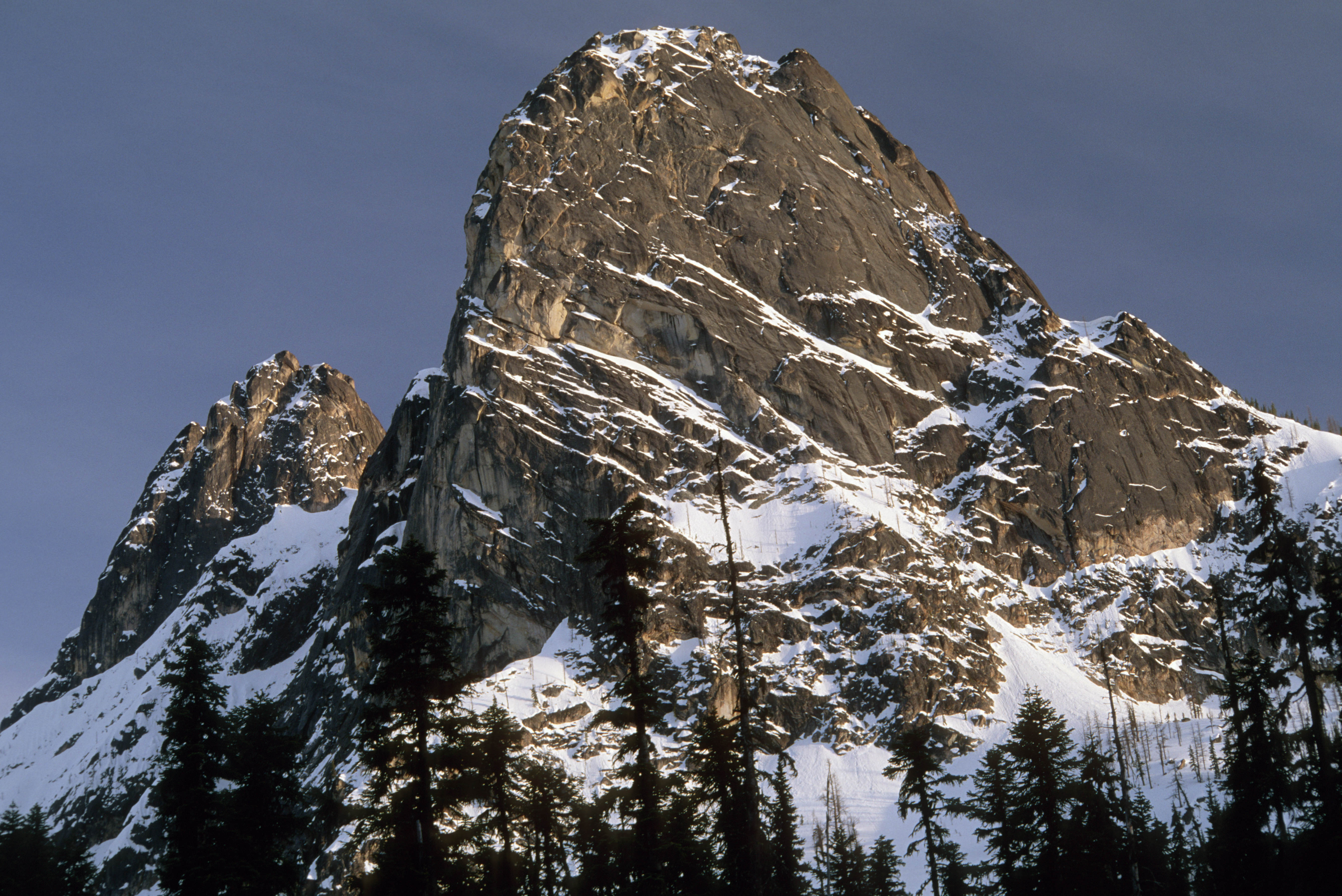
Liberty Bell Mountain

The history of the formation of the Cascade Mountains dates back millions of years ago to the late Eocene Epoch. With the North American Plate overriding the Pacific Plate, episodes of volcanic igneous activity persisted. In addition, small fragments of the oceanic and continental lithosphere called terranes created the North Cascades about 50 million years ago. Like many of the peaks of the Washington Pass area, Liberty Bell Mountain is carved from the granite of the Golden Horn batholith.

During the Pleistocene period dating back over two million years ago, glaciation advancing and retreating repeatedly scoured the landscape leaving deposits of rock debris. The U-shaped cross section of the river valleys is a result of recent glaciation. Uplift and faulting in combination with glaciation has been the dominant processes that have created the tall peaks and deep valleys of the North Cascades area.
