= Washington Pass =

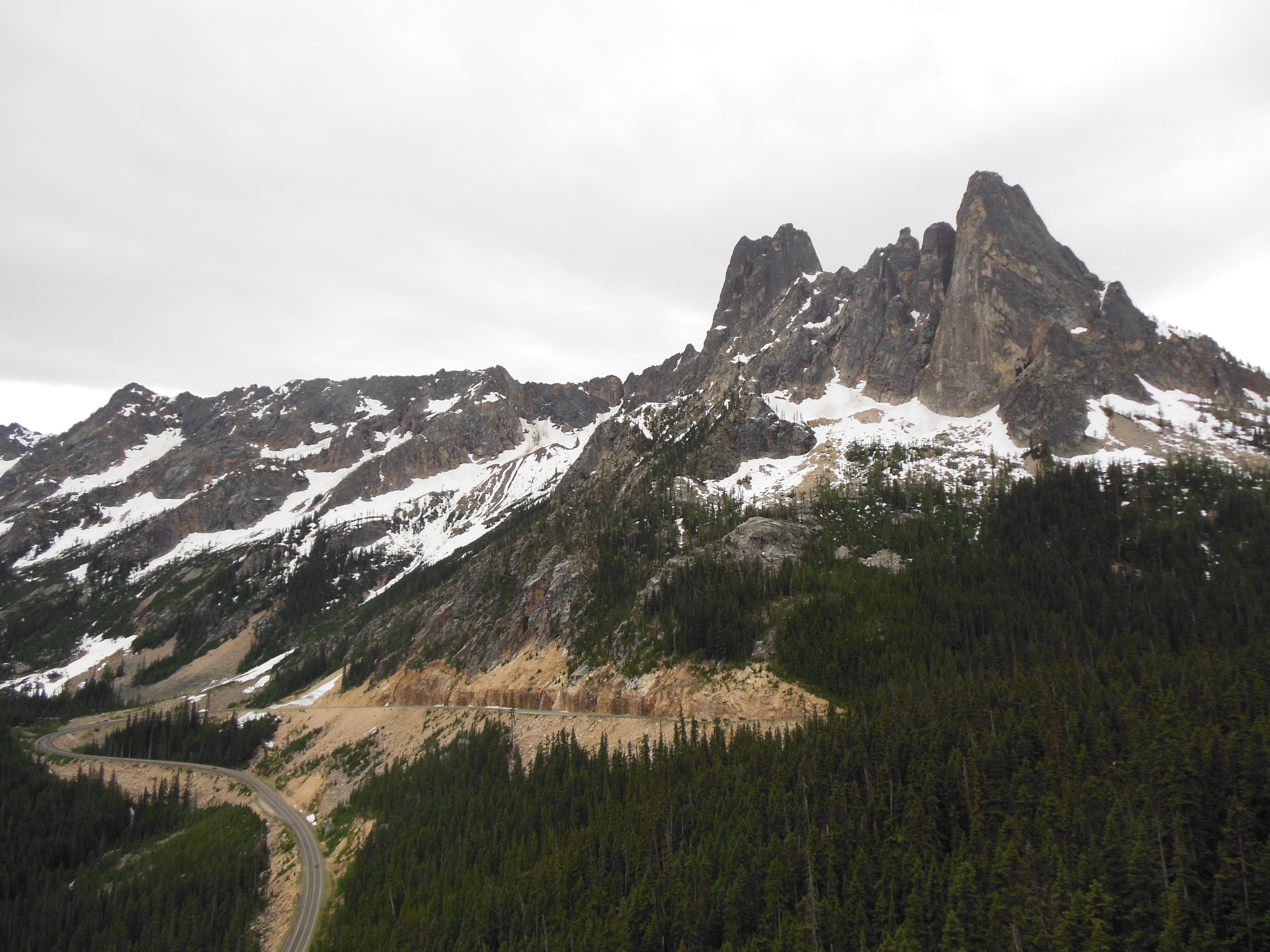
- State Route 20 and Liberty Bell Mountain at the pass, as seen from Washington Pass Overlook Trail
- Interactive map of Washington Pass
- Elevation: 5,477 ft (1,669 m)
- Traversed by: State Route 20

Third Approach
- Location: Chelan / Okanogan counties, Washington, United States
- Range: Cascades
- Coordinates: 48°31.4′N 120°39.3′W

Rainy Pass
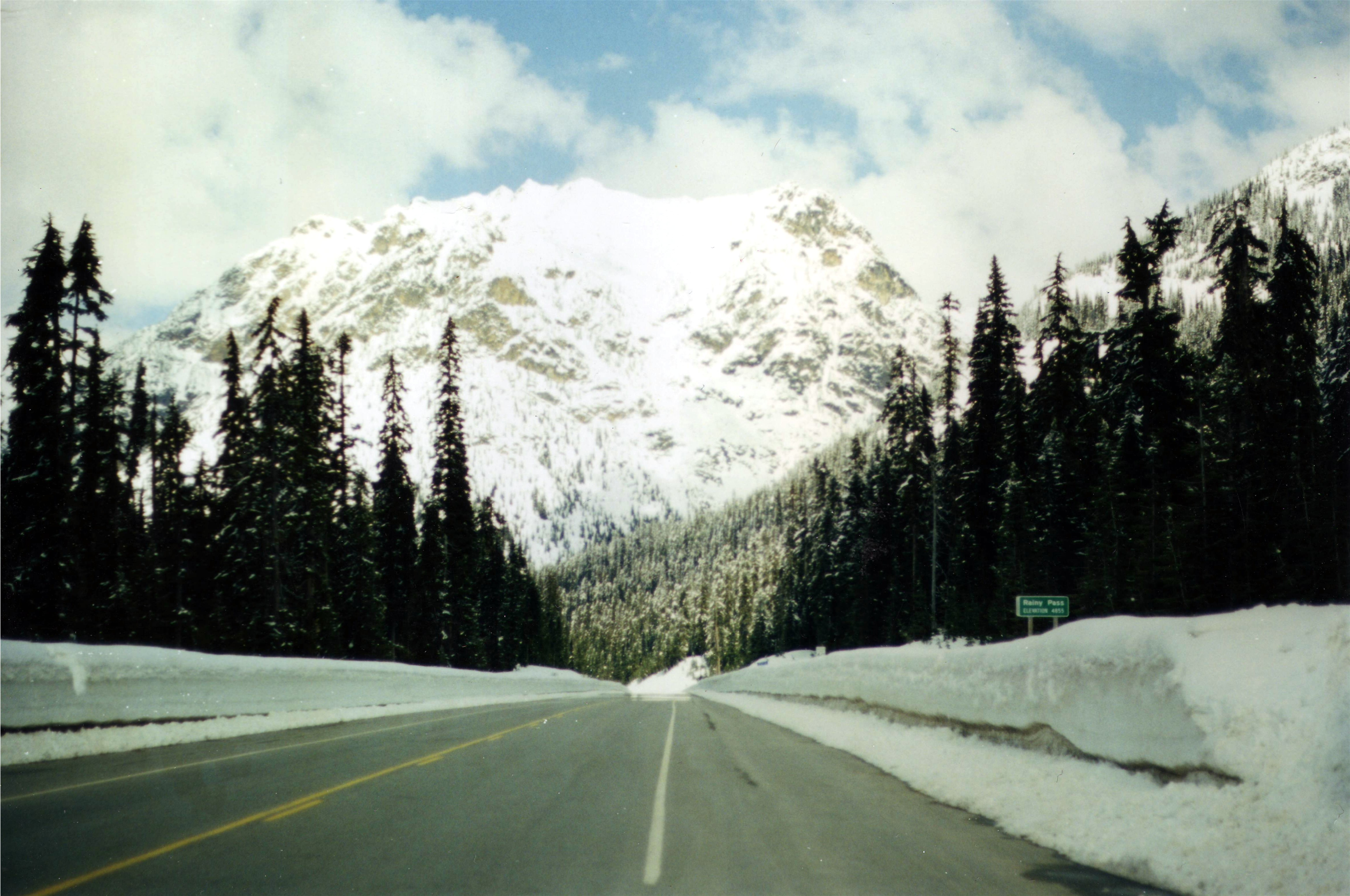
- Rainy Pass in spring
- Interactive map of Rainy Pass
- Elevation: 4,875 ft (1,486 m)
- Traversed by: State Route 20

Third Approach
- Location: Chelan / Skagit counties, Washington, United States
- Range: Cascades
- Coordinates: 48°31.1′N 120°44.1′W

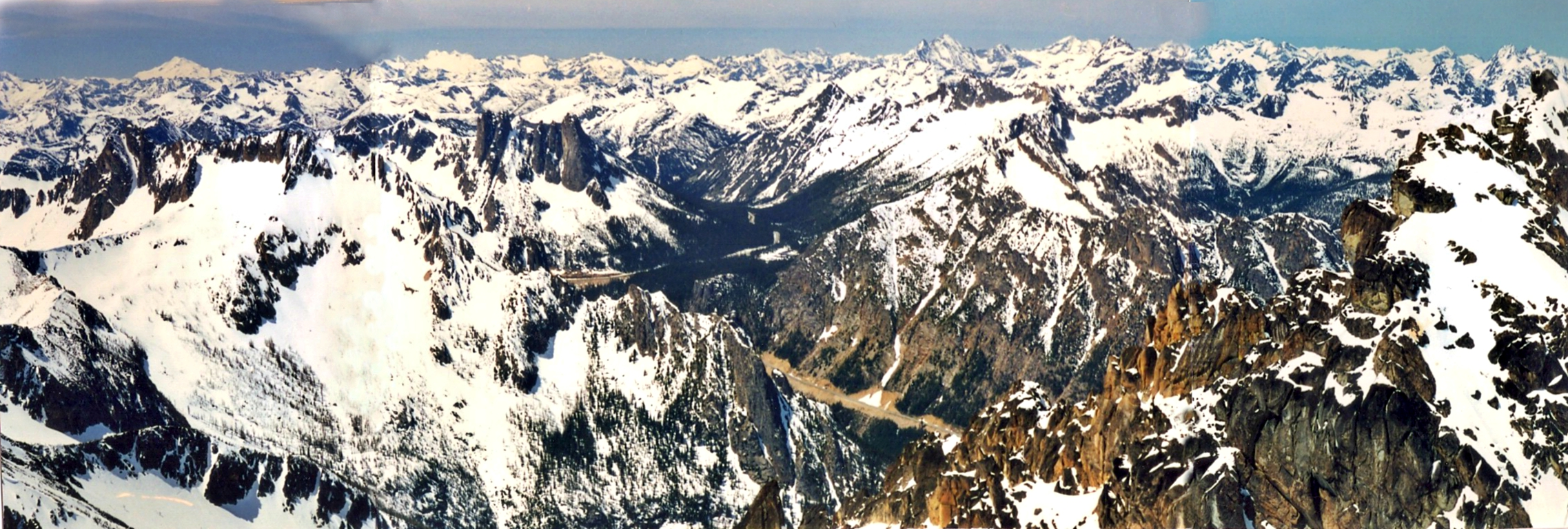
Washington Pass, North Cascades

Washington Pass (el. 5477 ft./1669 m.) and Rainy Pass (el. 4875 ft./1486 m.) are two mountain passes on State Route 20 (North Cascades Highway) in the North Cascades mountains of Washington state. Rainy Pass is about 4 miles to the west of Washington Pass. The passes are typically closed between November and April due to heavy snowfall.

The north–south Pacific Crest Trail crosses east-west Highway 20 at Rainy Pass. The Washington Pass Overlook Trail, designated a National Recreation Trail in 1978, runs a short 0.2 miles (0.32 km) from the pass to an overlook with views of Liberty Bell Mountain and the highway 700 feet (210 m) below.

== Climate ==
Washington and Rainy Passes are located in the marine west coast climate zone of western North America. Most weather fronts originate in the Pacific Ocean, and travel northeast toward the Cascade Mountains. As fronts approach the North Cascades, they are forced upward by the peaks of the Cascade Range (Orographic lift), causing them to drop their moisture in the form of rain or snowfall onto the Cascades. As a result, the west side of the North Cascades experiences high precipitation, especially during the winter months in the form of snowfall. During winter months, weather is usually cloudy, but, due to high pressure systems over the Pacific Ocean that intensify during summer months, there is often little or no cloud cover during the summer. Because of maritime influence, snow tends to be wet and heavy, resulting in high avalanche danger. The North Cascades Highway east of Washington Pass has the distinction of being among the top areas in the United States for most avalanche paths per mile of highway.

Climate data for Rainy Pass, Washington, 1991–2020 normals: 4890ft (1490m)
Month	Jan	Feb	Mar	Apr	May	Jun	Jul	Aug	Sep	Oct	Nov	Dec	Year
Mean daily maximum °F (°C)	27.7 (−2.4)	30.3 (−0.9)	35.8 (2.1)	43.4 (6.3)	52.3 (11.3)	57.6 (14.2)	68.0 (20.0)	67.2 (19.6)	56.9 (13.8)	42.9 (6.1)	31.8 (−0.1)	26.1 (−3.3)	45.0 (7.2)
Daily mean °F (°C)	23.5 (−4.7)	25.0 (−3.9)	29.3 (−1.5)	35.5 (1.9)	42.9 (6.1)	47.9 (8.8)	56.5 (13.6)	56.5 (13.6)	48.8 (9.3)	37.7 (3.2)	28.0 (−2.2)	22.3 (−5.4)	37.8 (3.2)
Mean daily minimum °F (°C)	19.3 (−7.1)	19.6 (−6.9)	22.7 (−5.2)	27.6 (−2.4)	33.4 (0.8)	38.2 (3.4)	45.0 (7.2)	45.7 (7.6)	40.6 (4.8)	32.4 (0.2)	24.2 (−4.3)	18.5 (−7.5)	30.6 (−0.8)
Average precipitation inches (mm)	8.80 (224)	6.18 (157)	6.33 (161)	3.73 (95)	2.55 (65)	1.95 (50)	1.04 (26)	1.25 (32)	2.31 (59)	5.83 (148)	9.27 (235)	8.21 (209)	57.45 (1,461)
Source 1: XMACIS2
Source 2: NOAA (Precipitation)
