= Reynolds Peak (Washington) =

Mountain in the Methow Mountains, part of the Cascades Range in Washington, USA

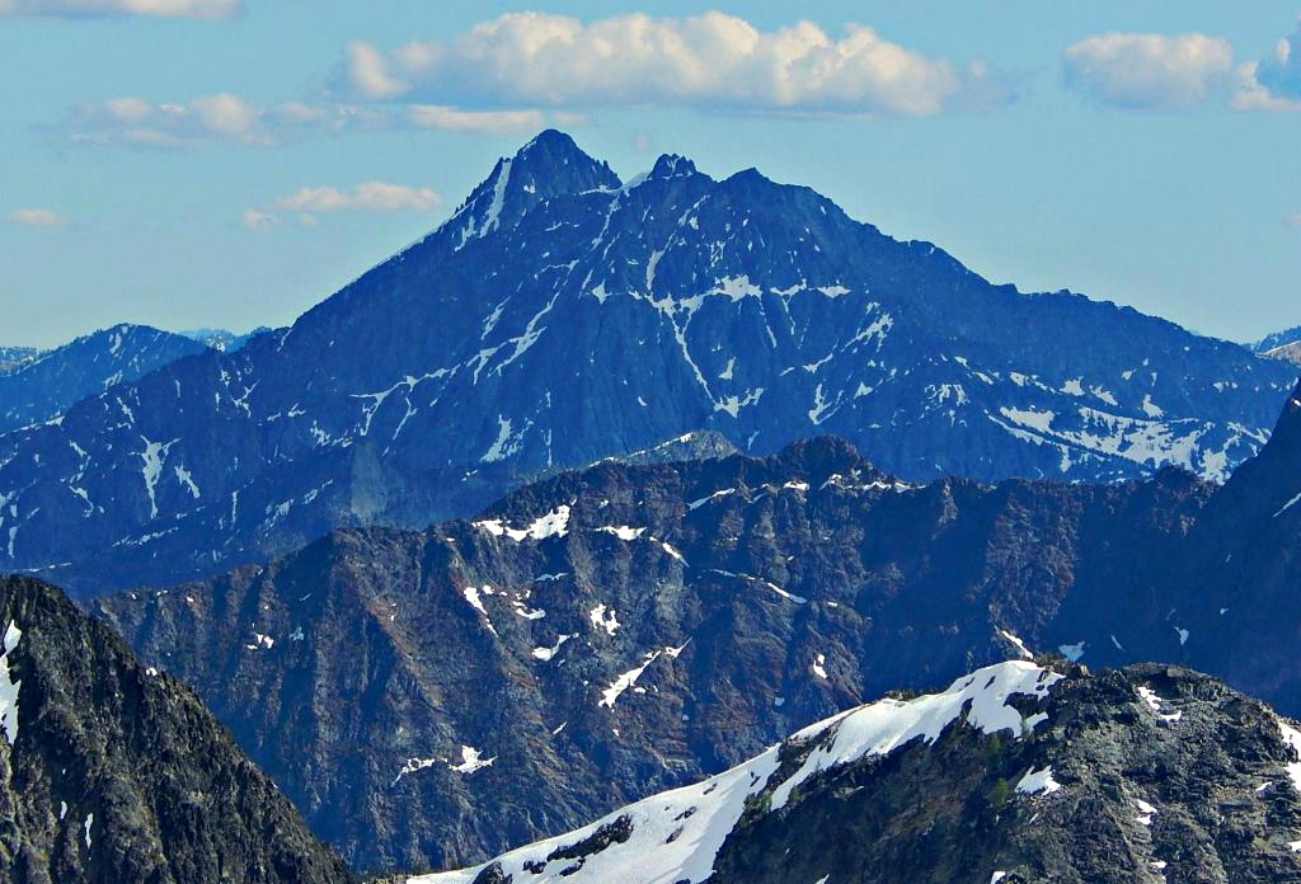
- Reynolds Peak seen from Wallaby Peak

Highest point
- Elevation: 8,517 ft (2,596 m) NAVD 88
- Prominence: 2,032 ft (619 m)
- Parent peak: Star Peak (8,690 ft)
- Isolation: 8.55 mi (13.76 km)
- Coordinates: 48°22′25″N 120°34′01″W

Geography
- Location within Washington (state) Location within the United States
- Interactive map of Reynolds Peak
- Country: United States
- State: Washington
- County: Chelan
- Protected area: Glacier Peak Wilderness
- Parent range: North Cascades
- Topo map: USGS Sun Mountain

Geology
- Rock age: Eocene to Late Cretaceous
- Rock type: Tonalitic Orthogneiss

Climbing
- First ascent: 1898 or 1899 by Survey Party including Albert Hale Sylvester
- Easiest route: class 3 scrambling

Reynolds Peak is an 8,517-foot (2,596-metre) mountain summit located in the Methow Mountains, a sub-range of the North Cascades in Washington state. It is protected by the Lake Chelan-Sawtooth Wilderness within the Okanogan–Wenatchee National Forest. Reynolds Peak has a subsidiary peak, North Peak (elevation 8,384 feet (2,555 m)), which is 0.3 miles (0.48 km) north of the summit. The nearest higher neighbor is Oval Peak, 8.55 miles (13.76 km) to the southeast. Precipitation runoff on the east side of the mountain drains into the Twisp River via Reynolds Creek, whereas the west side of the mountain drains to the Stehekin River via Boulder Creek. Topographic relief is significant as the summit rises 3,500 feet (1,100 meters) above Reynolds Creek in approximately one mile.

== Climate ==
Lying east of the Cascade crest, the area around Reynolds Peak is a bit drier than areas to the west. Summers can bring warm temperatures and occasional thunderstorms. With its impressive height, Reynolds Peak can have snow on it in late-Spring and early-Fall, and can be very cold in the winter.

== Geology ==
The North Cascades features some of the most rugged topography in the Cascade Range with craggy peaks, ridges, and deep glacial valleys. Geological events occurring many years ago created the diverse topography and drastic elevation changes over the Cascade Range leading to the various climate differences. These climate differences lead to vegetation variety defining the ecoregions in this area.

The history of the formation of the Cascade Mountains dates back millions of years ago to the late Eocene Epoch. With the North American Plate overriding the Pacific Plate, episodes of volcanic igneous activity persisted. In addition, small fragments of the oceanic and continental lithosphere called terranes created the North Cascades about 50 million years ago.

During the Pleistocene period dating back over two million years ago, glaciation advancing and retreating repeatedly scoured the landscape leaving deposits of rock debris. The U-shaped cross section of the river valleys is a result of recent glaciation. Uplift and faulting in combination with glaciation have been the dominant processes which have created the tall peaks and deep valleys of the North Cascades area.

== Gallery ==
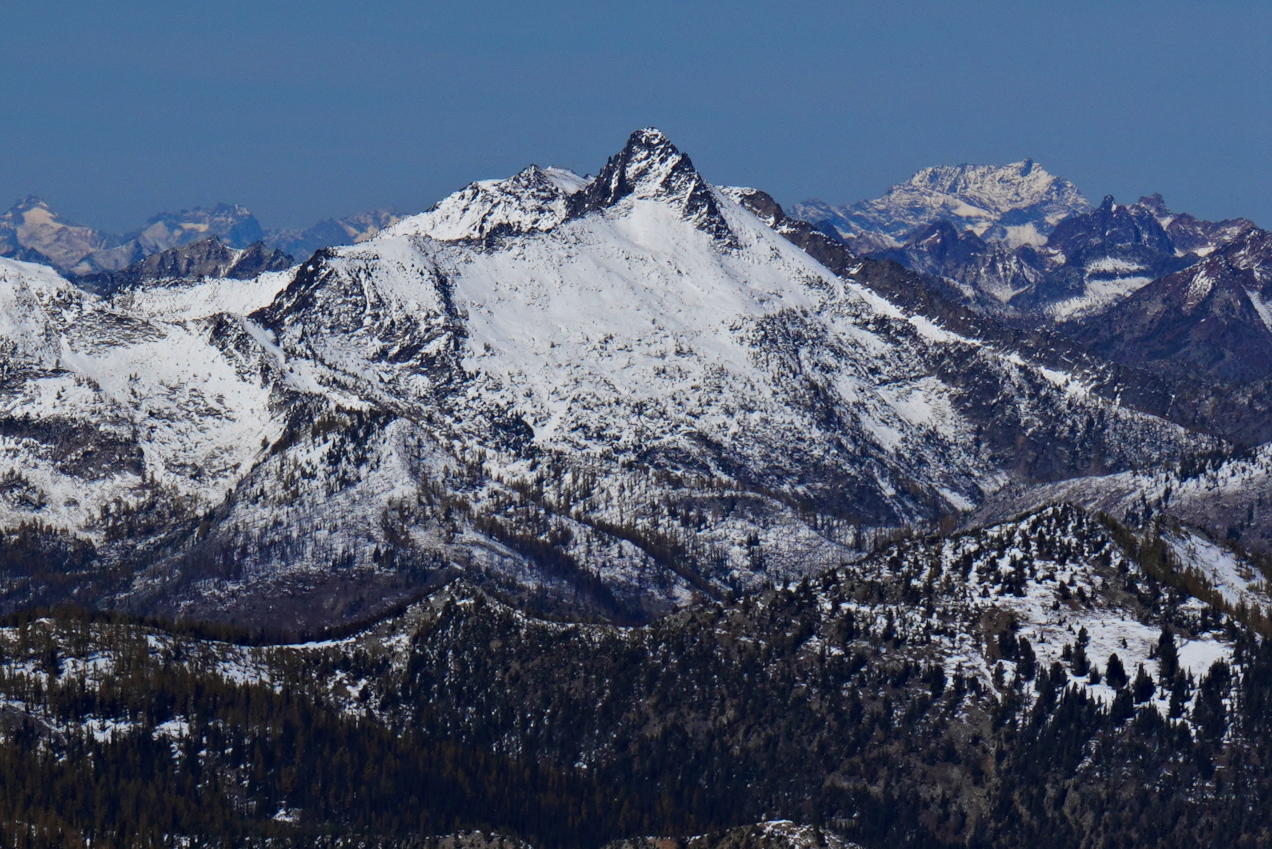
Reynolds Peak seen from Courtney Peak

== See also ==
- List of mountain peaks of Washington (state)
- Geography of the North Cascades
- Geology of the Pacific Northwest
