= Mount Bigelow (Washington) =

Mountain in Washington, United States

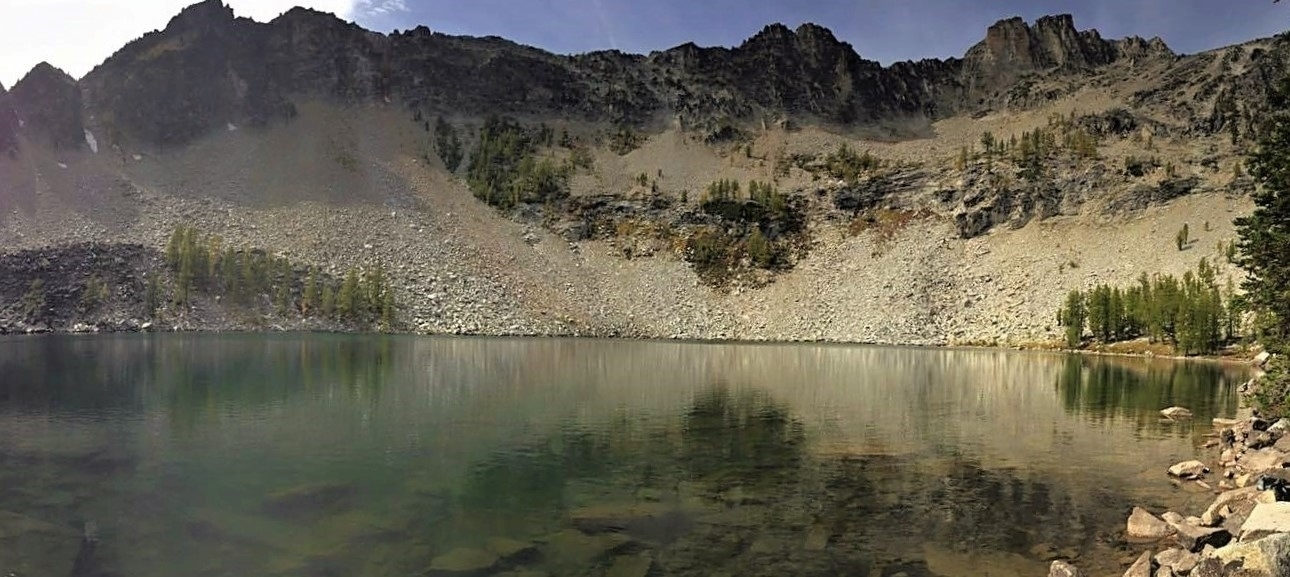
- East aspect, summit in upper right

Highest point
- Elevation: 8,449 ft (2,575 m)
- Prominence: 800 ft (244 m)
- Parent peak: Raven Ridge (8,572 ft)
- Isolation: 1.71 mi (2.75 km)
- Coordinates: 48°13′05″N 120°21′15″W

Naming
- Etymology: Frank Ezra Bigelow

Geography
- Location within Washington (state) Location within the United States
- Interactive map of
- Country: United States
- State: Washington
- County: Chelan / Okanogan
- Protected area: Lake Chelan-Sawtooth Wilderness
- Parent range: Methow Mountains; North Cascades; Cascade Range
- Topo map: USGS Martin Peak

Geology
- Rock age: Eocene to Late Cretaceous
- Rock type: Tonalitic Orthogneiss

Climbing
- Easiest route: class 3 scrambling

Mount Bigelow is an 8,449-foot-elevation (2,575-meter) mountain summit located on the border shared by Okanogan and Chelan counties in Washington state.

== Description ==
Mount Bigelow is set on the boundary of the Lake Chelan-Sawtooth Wilderness, on land managed by the Okanogan–Wenatchee National Forest. The peak is the southernmost point in the wilderness. Bigelow ranks as the fifth-highest peak on Sawtooth Ridge, 10th-highest peak in the Methow Mountains, and the 67th-highest in Washington. Other peaks of Sawtooth Ridge include Oval Peak, Star Peak, Hoodoo Peak, Courtney Peak, Switchback Peak, Martin Peak, and Raven Ridge which is the nearest higher neighbor, 1.69 miles (2.72 km) to the northeast of Bigelow. Precipitation runoff from the north side of the mountain drains into East Fork Buttermilk Creek en route to the Twisp River, the west slope drains to Lake Chelan via Prince Creek, and the east side of the mountain drains into tributaries of the Methow River. Topographic relief is significant as the summit rises over 1,300 feet (396 meters) above Upper Eagle Lake in 0.35 mile (0.56 km). This mountain's toponym was officially adopted in 1971 by the U.S. Board on Geographic Names. The mountain is named in memory of Frank E. Bigelow (1877–1969), an early homesteader in the Lake Chelan area who worked on trails for the Forest Service for many years.

== Climate ==
Lying east of the Cascade crest, the area around Mount Bigelow is a bit drier than areas to the west. Summers can bring warm temperatures and occasional thunderstorms. Most weather fronts originate in the Pacific Ocean, and travel northeast toward the Cascade Mountains. As fronts approach the North Cascades, they are forced upward by the peaks (orographic lift), causing them to drop their moisture in the form of rain or snowfall onto the Cascades. As a result, the North Cascades experience high precipitation, especially during the winter months in the form of snowfall. During winter months, weather is usually cloudy, but due to high pressure systems over the Pacific Ocean that intensify during summer months, there is often little or no cloud cover during the summer.

== Geology ==
The North Cascades features some of the most rugged topography in the Cascade Range with craggy peaks, ridges, and deep glacial valleys. Geological events occurring many years ago created the diverse topography and drastic elevation changes over the Cascade Range leading to the various climate differences. These climate differences lead to vegetation variety defining the ecoregions in this area.

The history of the formation of the Cascade Mountains dates back millions of years ago to the late Eocene Epoch. With the North American Plate overriding the Pacific Plate, episodes of volcanic igneous activity persisted. In addition, small fragments of the oceanic and continental lithosphere called terranes created the North Cascades about 50 million years ago.

During the Pleistocene period dating back over two million years ago, glaciation advancing and retreating repeatedly scoured the landscape leaving deposits of rock debris. The U-shaped cross sections of the river valleys are a result of recent glaciation. Uplift and faulting in combination with glaciation have been the dominant processes which have created the tall peaks and deep valleys of the North Cascades area.

== Gallery ==
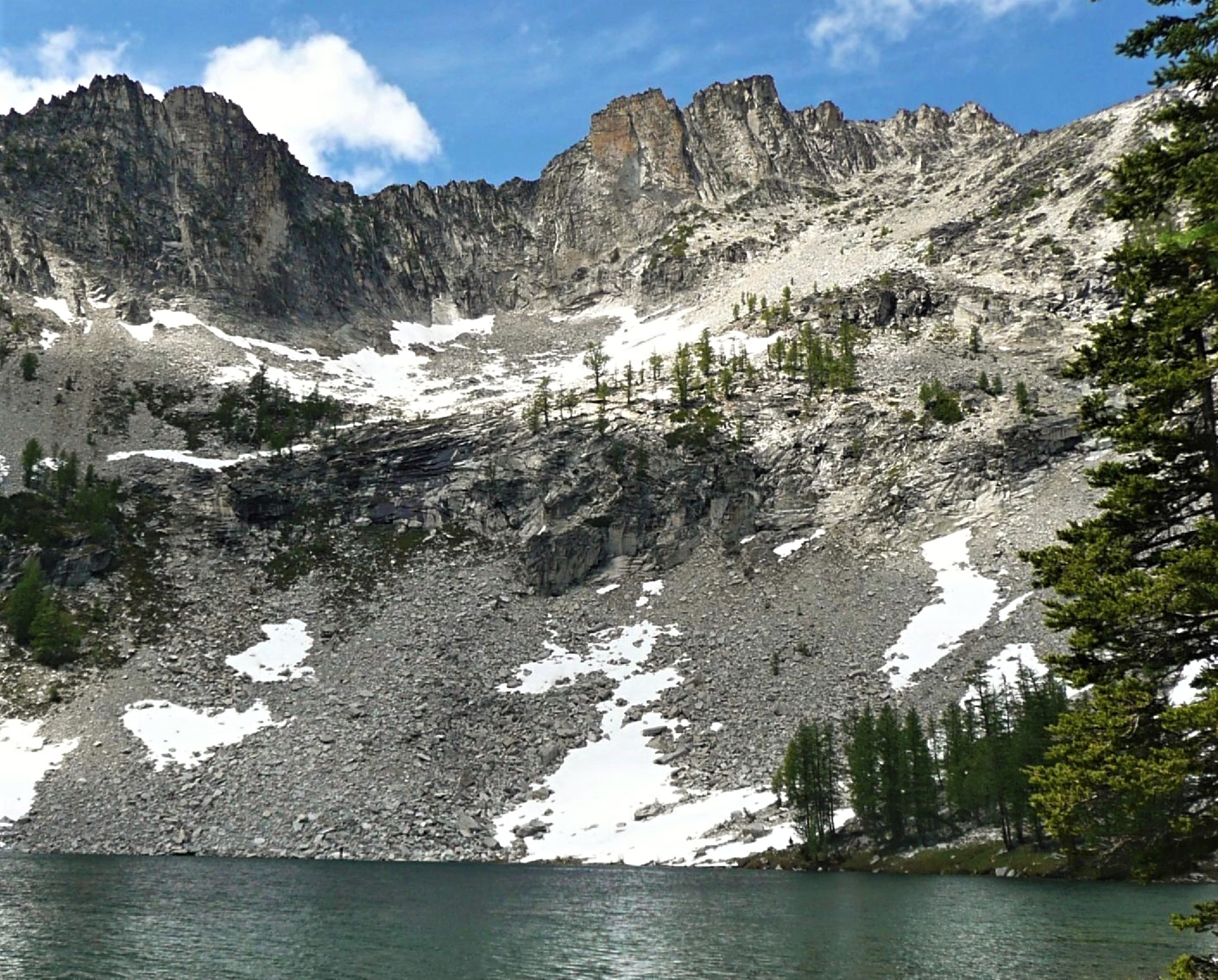
Mount Bigelow

== See also ==
- Geography of the North Cascades
- List of mountain peaks of Washington (state)
