= Switchback Peak =

Mountain in Washington (state), United States

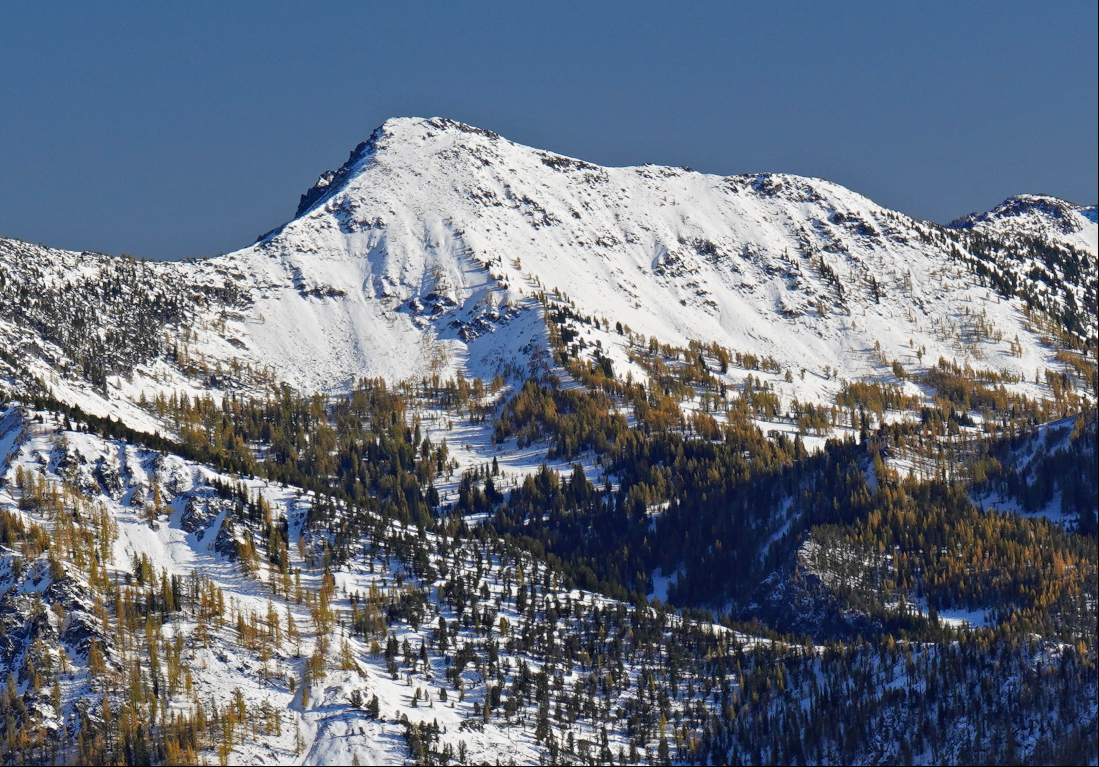
- Switchback Peak, northwest aspect

Highest point
- Elevation: 8,321 ft (2,536 m)
- Prominence: 441 ft (134 m)
- Parent peak: Martin Peak (8,375 ft)
- Isolation: 0.96 mi (1.54 km)
- Coordinates: 48°10′32″N 120°21′30″W

Geography
- Location within Washington (state) Location within the United States
- Interactive map of Switchback Peak
- Location: Okanogan County/Chelan County; Washington, U.S.
- Parent range: Methow Mountains; North Cascades; Cascade Range
- Topo map: USGS Martin Peak

Climbing
- Easiest route: class 2 hiking trail

Switchback Peak is an 8,321-foot (2,536-metre) mountain summit located in the Methow Mountains, a subset of the North Cascades in Washington state. It is the eighth-highest peak in the Methow Mountains, and ranks 95th in the state of Washington. Switchback Peak is set on Sawtooth Ridge, on land managed by the Okanogan-Wenatchee National Forest. Other peaks of Sawtooth Ridge include Oval Peak, Star Peak, Hoodoo Peak, Courtney Peak, Mount Bigelow, and Martin Peak, which is the nearest higher neighbor, 0.96 miles (1.54 km) to the north.

== Climate ==
Lying east of the Cascade crest, the area around Switchback Peak is a bit drier than areas to the west. Summers can bring warm temperatures and occasional thunderstorms. Most weather fronts originate in the Pacific Ocean, and travel northeast toward the Cascade Mountains. As fronts approach the North Cascades, they are forced upward by the peaks of the Cascade Range, causing them to drop their moisture in the form of rain or snowfall onto the Cascades (Orographic lift). As a result, the North Cascades experiences high precipitation, especially during the winter months in the form of snowfall. With its height, Switchback Peak can have snow on it in late-spring and early-fall, and can be very cold in the winter. Precipitation runoff on the west side of the mountain drains into Lake Chelan via Prince Creek, whereas the east side of the mountain drains into tributaries of the Methow River.

== Geology ==
The North Cascades features some of the most rugged topography in the Cascade Range with craggy peaks, ridges, and deep glacial valleys. Geological events occurring many years ago created the diverse topography and drastic elevation changes over the Cascade Range leading to the various climate differences. These climate differences lead to vegetation variety defining the ecoregions in this area.

The history of the formation of the Cascade Mountains dates back millions of years ago to the late Eocene Epoch. With the North American Plate overriding the Pacific Plate, episodes of volcanic igneous activity persisted. In addition, small fragments of the oceanic and continental lithosphere called terranes created the North Cascades about 50 million years ago.

During the Pleistocene period dating back over two million years ago, glaciation advancing and retreating repeatedly scoured the landscape leaving deposits of rock debris. The U-shaped cross section of the river valleys is a result of recent glaciation. Uplift and faulting in combination with glaciation have been the dominant processes which have created the tall peaks and deep valleys of the North Cascades area.

== See also ==
- Geography of the North Cascades
- List of mountain peaks of Washington (state)
