= Martin Peak (Methow Mountains) =

Mountain in Washington (state), United States

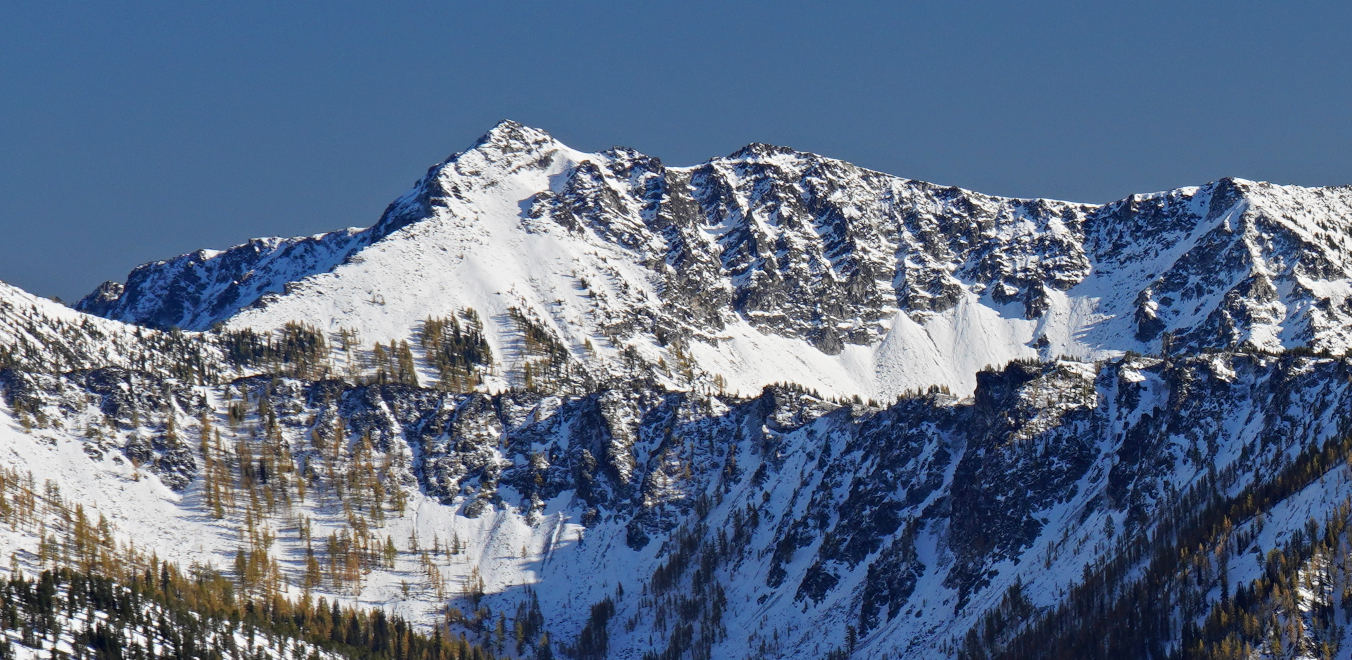
- Martin Peak, northwest aspect

Highest point
- Elevation: 8,377 ft (2,553 m)
- Prominence: 855 ft (261 m)
- Parent peak: Mount Bigelow (8,449 ft)
- Isolation: 2.08 mi (3.35 km)
- Coordinates: 48°11′19″N 120°21′04″W

Geography
- Location within Washington (state) Location within the United States
- Interactive map of Martin Peak
- Country: United States
- State: Washington
- County: Chelan / Okanogan
- Parent range: Methow Mountains; North Cascades; Cascade Range
- Topo map: USGS Martin Peak

Climbing
- Easiest route: Scrambling class 2+

Martin Peak is an 8,377-foot (2,553-metre) mountain summit located in the Methow Mountains, a subset of the North Cascades in Washington state. It is the seventh-highest peak in the Methow Mountains, and ranks 80th in the state of Washington. Martin Peak is set on Sawtooth Ridge, at the head of Martin Creek, on land managed by the Okanogan-Wenatchee National Forest. Other peaks of Sawtooth Ridge include Oval Peak, Star Peak, Hoodoo Peak, Courtney Peak, Switchback Peak, and Mount Bigelow, which is the nearest higher neighbor, 2.06 miles (3.32 km) to the north of Martin.

== Climate ==
Lying east of the Cascade crest, the area around Martin Peak is a bit drier than areas to the west. Summers can bring warm temperatures and occasional thunderstorms. Weather fronts originating in the Pacific Ocean travel northeast toward the Cascade Mountains. As fronts approach the North Cascades, they are forced upward by the peaks of the Cascade Range, causing them to drop their moisture in the form of rain or snow onto the Cascades (Orographic lift). As a result, the North Cascades experience high precipitation, especially during the winter months in the form of snowfall. With its impressive height, Martin Peak can have snow on it in late-spring and early-fall, and can be very cold in the winter. Precipitation runoff on the west side of the mountain drains into Lake Chelan via Prince Creek, whereas the east side of the mountain drains into Martin Creek and tributaries of the Methow River.

== Geology ==
The North Cascades features some of the most rugged topography in the Cascade Range with craggy peaks, ridges, and deep glacial valleys. Geological events occurring many years ago created the diverse topography and drastic elevation changes over the Cascade Range leading to the various climate differences. These climate differences lead to vegetation variety defining the ecoregions in this area.

The history of the formation of the Cascade Mountains dates back millions of years ago to the late Eocene Epoch. With the North American Plate overriding the Pacific Plate, episodes of volcanic igneous activity persisted. In addition, small fragments of the oceanic and continental lithosphere called terranes created the North Cascades about 50 million years ago.

During the Pleistocene period dating back over two million years ago, glaciation advancing and retreating repeatedly scoured the landscape leaving deposits of rock debris. The U-shaped cross section of the river valleys is a result of recent glaciation. Uplift and faulting in combination with glaciation have been the dominant processes which have created the tall peaks and deep valleys of the North Cascades area.

== See also ==
- Geography of the North Cascades
- List of mountain peaks of Washington (state)
