= Mother Lode (Methow Mountains) =

Mountain in Washington (state), United States

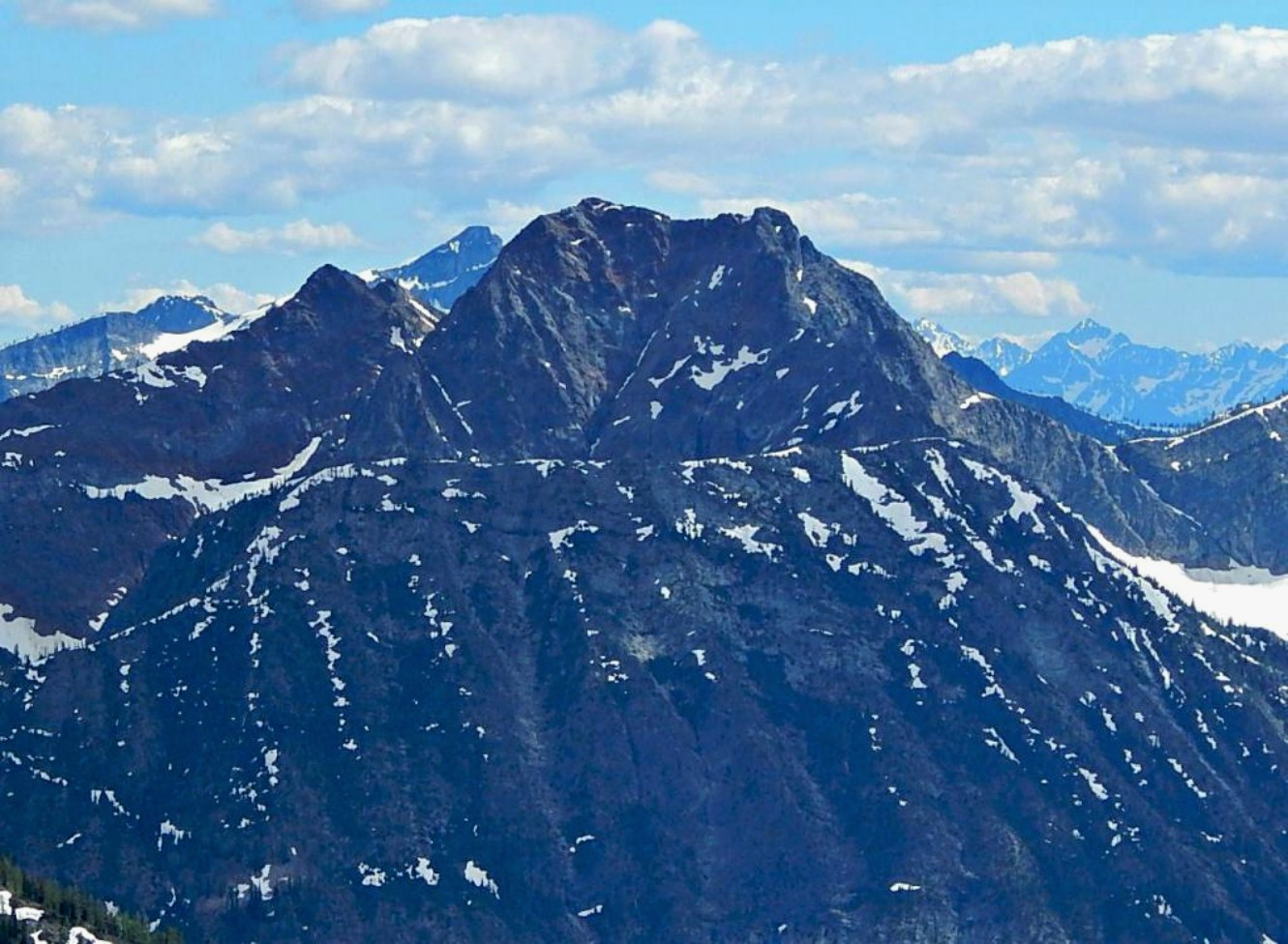
- North aspect, from Wallaby Peak

Highest point
- Elevation: 7,905 ft (2,409 m)
- Prominence: 1,585 ft (483 m)
- Parent peak: Gilbert Mountain (8,023 ft)
- Isolation: 3.03 mi (4.88 km)
- Coordinates: 48°26′37″N 120°36′54″W

Naming
- Etymology: Mother lode

Geography
- Location within Washington (state) Location within the United States
- Interactive map of Mother Lode
- Country: United States
- State: Washington
- County: Okanogan
- Protected area: Lake Chelan-Sawtooth Wilderness
- Parent range: Cascade Range; North Cascades; Methow Mountains
- Topo map: USGS Gilbert

Climbing
- Easiest route: class 4 scrambling North Ridge

Mother Lode is a 7,905-foot-elevation (2,409-meter) mountain summit located in the North Cascades, in Okanogan County, Washington. It is situated in the Lake Chelan-Sawtooth Wilderness, on land managed by Okanogan–Wenatchee National Forest. The mountain is part of the Methow Mountains, which are a subset of the Cascade Range, and the peak is approximately two miles east of the crest of the range. Mother Lode is set approximately six miles south of Washington Pass, and the nearest higher neighbor is Gilbert Mountain, three miles to the northeast. Topographic relief is significant as the north aspect rises 3,500 feet (1,100 meters) above the South Fork Twisp River in one mile. The peak was climbed in 1983 by Rick La Belle and Glen Sterr via the north ridge, and the northeast ridge was climbed in 1985 by Carl and Gordon Skoog. Precipitation runoff from the peak drains into tributaries of Twisp River, which in turn is a tributary of the Methow River.

== Climate ==
Weather fronts originating in the Pacific Ocean travel northeast toward the Cascade Mountains. As fronts approach the North Cascades, they are forced upward by the peaks of the Cascade Range (Orographic lift), causing them to drop their moisture in the form of rain or snowfall onto the Cascades. As a result, the west side of the North Cascades experiences high precipitation, especially during the winter months in the form of snowfall. Because of maritime influence, snow tends to be wet and heavy, resulting in avalanche danger. During winter months, weather is usually cloudy, but due to high pressure systems over the Pacific Ocean that intensify during summer months, there is often little or no cloud cover during the summer.

== Geology ==
The North Cascades features some of the most rugged topography in the Cascade Range with craggy peaks, ridges, and deep glacial valleys. Geological events occurring many years ago created the diverse topography and drastic elevation changes over the Cascade Range leading to the various climate differences. These climate differences lead to vegetation variety defining the ecoregions in this area. The history of the formation of the Cascade Mountains dates back millions of years ago to the late Eocene Epoch. With the North American Plate overriding the Pacific Plate, episodes of volcanic igneous activity persisted. In addition, small fragments of the oceanic and continental lithosphere called terranes created the North Cascades about 50 million years ago.

During the Pleistocene period dating back over two million years ago, glaciation advancing and retreating repeatedly scoured the landscape leaving deposits of rock debris. The U-shaped cross section of the river valleys is a result of recent glaciation. Uplift and faulting in combination with glaciation have been the dominant processes which have created the tall peaks and deep valleys of the North Cascades area.

== Gallery ==
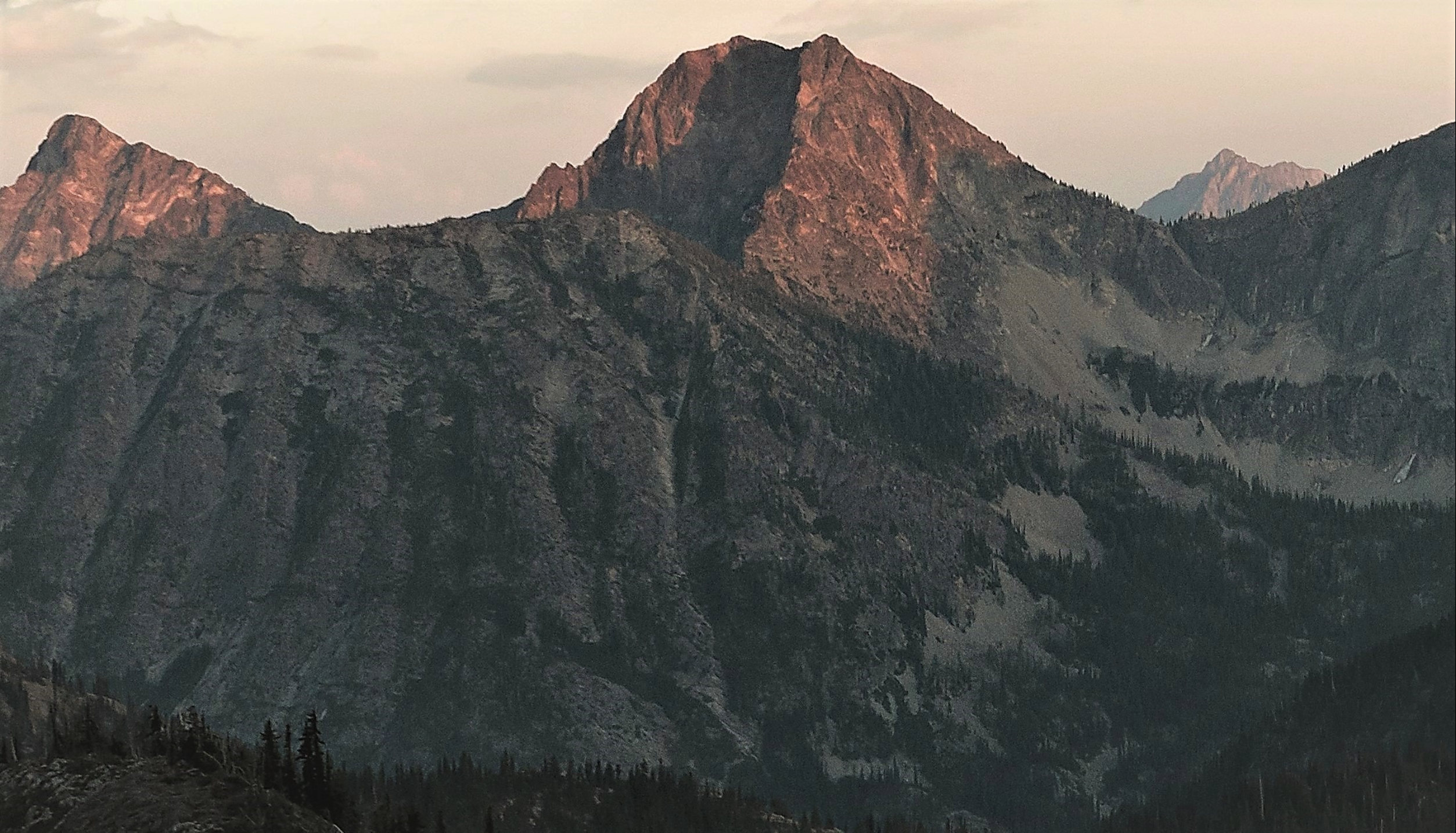
Mother Lode Peak

== See also ==
- Geography of the North Cascades
- Geology of the Pacific Northwest
