= Gray Peak (Washington) =

Mountain in Washington (state), United States

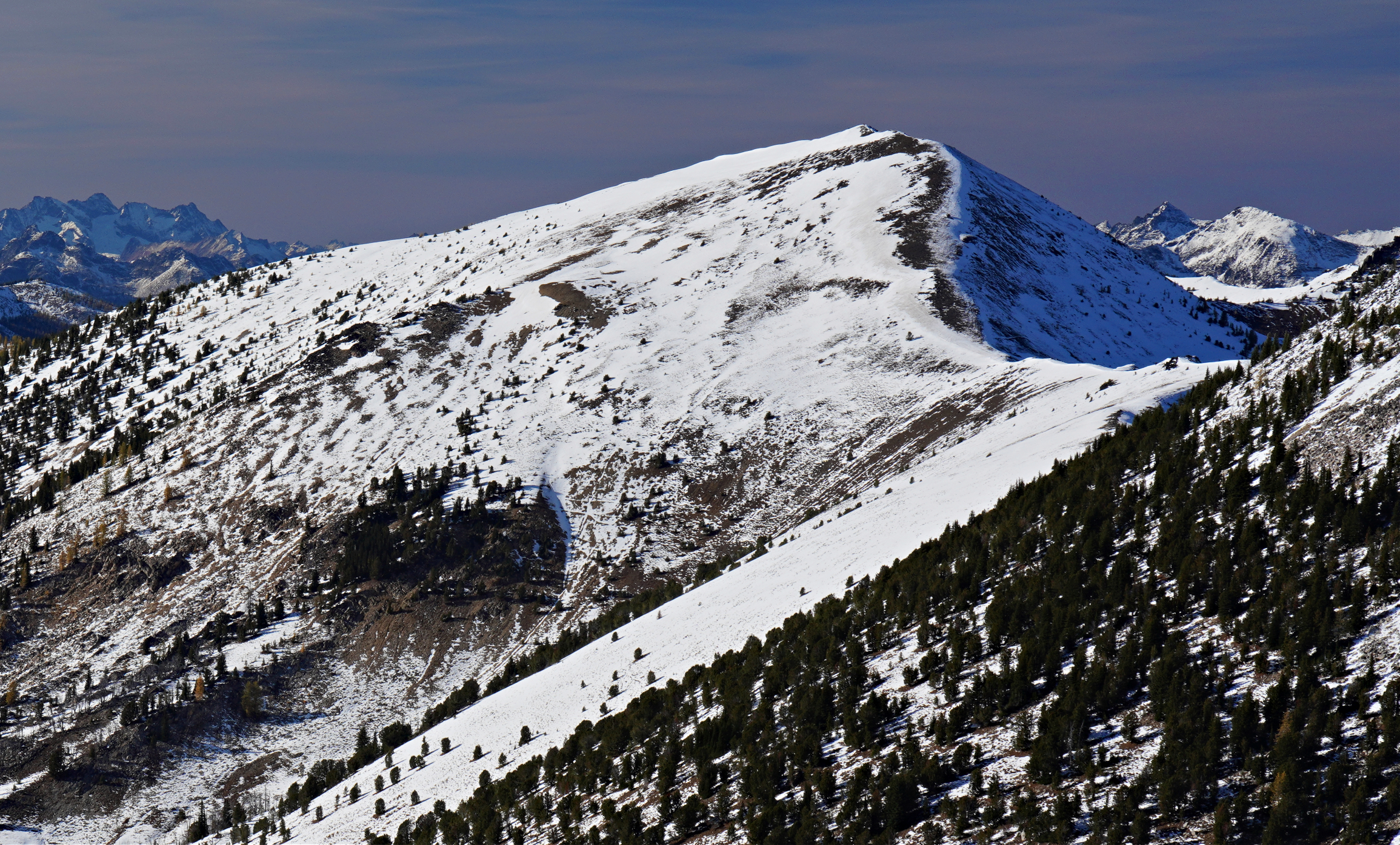
- Gray Peak, southeast aspect

Highest point
- Elevation: 8,086 ft (2,465 m)
- Prominence: 425 ft (130 m)
- Parent peak: Courtney Peak
- Isolation: 0.88 mi (1.42 km)
- Coordinates: 48°16′03″N 120°27′53″W

Geography
- Location within Washington (state) Location within the United States
- Interactive map of Gray Peak
- Country: United States
- State: Washington
- County: Chelan / Okanogan
- Protected area: Lake Chelan-Sawtooth Wilderness
- Parent range: Methow Mountains; North Cascades
- Topo map: USGS Oval Peak

Climbing
- Easiest route: class 2

Gray Peak is an 8,086-foot (2,465-metre) mountain summit located in the Methow Mountains, a sub-range of the North Cascades in Washington state. Situated on Sawtooth Ridge, west of Oval Lakes, Gray Peak is protected by the Lake Chelan-Sawtooth Wilderness within the Okanogan–Wenatchee National Forest. The nearest higher peak is Courtney Peak, 1.07 miles (1.72 km) to the southeast. Precipitation runoff on the south side of the mountain drains into nearby Lake Chelan via Fish Creek, whereas the north side of the mountain drains into Oval Creek, which is a tributary of the Twisp River.

== Climate ==
According to the Köppen climate classification system, Gray Peak has an alpine climate. Lying east of the Cascade crest, the area around Gray Peak is a bit drier than areas to the west. Summers can bring warm temperatures and occasional thunderstorms. Weather fronts originating in the Pacific Ocean travel northeast toward the Cascade Mountains. As fronts approach the North Cascades, they are forced upward by the peaks of the Cascade Range (orographic lift), causing them to drop their moisture in the form of rain or snowfall onto the Cascades. As a result, the North Cascades experiences high precipitation, especially during the winter months in the form of snowfall. Gray Peak can have snow on it in late-spring and early-fall, and it can be very cold in the winter.

== Geology ==
The North Cascades features some of the most rugged topography in the Cascade Range with craggy peaks, ridges, and deep glacial valleys. Geological events occurring many years ago created the diverse topography and drastic elevation changes over the Cascade Range leading to the various climate differences. These climate differences lead to vegetation variety defining the ecoregions in this area.

The history of the formation of the Cascade Mountains dates back millions of years ago to the late Eocene Epoch. With the North American Plate overriding the Pacific Plate, episodes of volcanic igneous activity persisted. In addition, small fragments of the oceanic and continental lithosphere called terranes created the North Cascades about 50 million years ago.

During the Pleistocene period dating back over two million years ago, glaciation advancing and retreating repeatedly scoured the landscape leaving deposits of rock debris. The U-shaped cross section of the river valleys is a result of recent glaciation. Uplift and faulting in combination with glaciation have been the dominant processes which have created the tall peaks and deep valleys of the North Cascades area.

== See also ==
- Geography of Washington (state)
- Geology of the Pacific Northwest
