= Finney Peak =

Mountain in Washington (state), United States

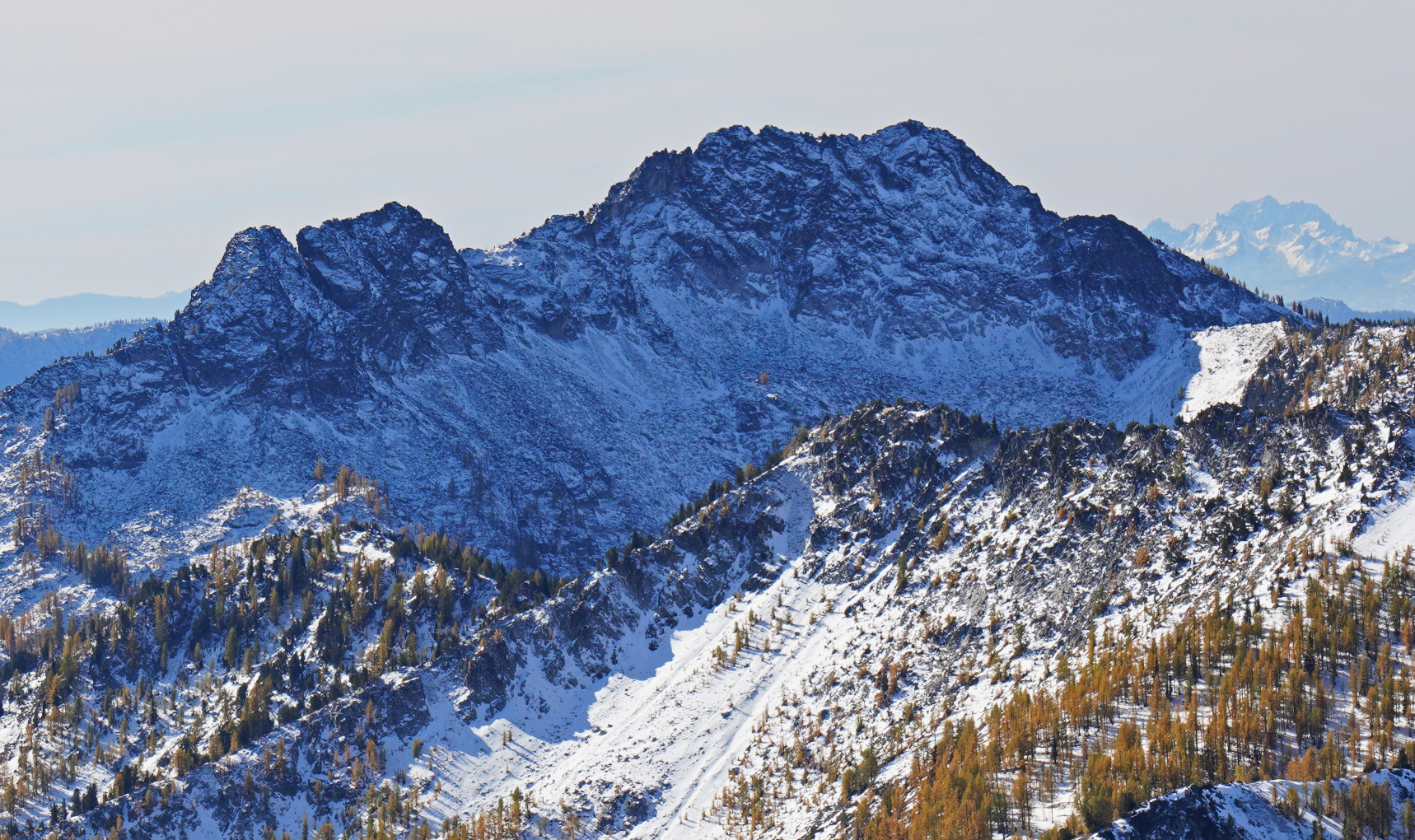
- Finney Peak, north aspect

Highest point
- Elevation: 8,110 ft (2,472 m)
- Prominence: 830 ft (250 m)
- Parent peak: Star Peak (8,690 ft)
- Isolation: 3.07 mi (4.94 km)
- Coordinates: 48°12′49″N 120°27′53″W

Geography
- Location within Washington (state) Location within the United States
- Interactive map of Finney Peak
- Location: Lake Chelan-Sawtooth Wilderness; Chelan County; Washington, U.S.
- Parent range: Methow Mountains; North Cascades
- Topo map: USGS Prince Creek

Finney Peak is an 8,110-foot (2,470-metre) mountain summit located west of Sawtooth Ridge (The Sawtooths), a sub-range of the North Cascades in Chelan County of Washington state. Finney Peak is situated within the Lake Chelan-Sawtooth Wilderness on land managed by the Okanogan–Wenatchee National Forest. The nearest higher peak is Star Peak, 3 miles (4.8 km) to the northeast. Precipitation runoff from the mountain drains into nearby Lake Chelan via Prince Creek and Cascade Creek.

== Climate ==
Lying east of the Cascade crest, the area around Finney Peak is a bit drier than areas to the west. Summers can bring warm temperatures and occasional thunderstorms. Most weather fronts originate in the Pacific Ocean, and travel northeast toward the Cascade Mountains. As fronts approach the North Cascades, they are forced upward by the peaks of the Cascade Range, causing them to drop their moisture in the form of rain or snowfall onto the Cascades (Orographic lift). As a result, the North Cascades experiences high precipitation, especially during the winter months in the form of snowfall. Finney Peak can have snow on it from early-fall to late-spring, and can be very cold in the winter.

== Geology ==
The North Cascades features some of the most rugged topography in the Cascade Range with craggy peaks, ridges, and deep glacial valleys. Geological events occurring many years ago created the diverse topography and drastic elevation changes over the Cascade Range leading to the various climate differences. These climate differences lead to vegetation variety defining the ecoregions in this area.

The history of the formation of the Cascade Mountains dates back millions of years ago to the late Eocene Epoch. With the North American Plate overriding the Pacific Plate, episodes of volcanic igneous activity persisted. In addition, small fragments of the oceanic and continental lithosphere called terranes created the North Cascades about 50 million years ago.

During the Pleistocene period dating back over two million years ago, glaciation advancing and retreating repeatedly scoured the landscape leaving deposits of rock debris. The U-shaped cross section of the river valleys is a result of recent glaciation. Uplift and faulting in combination with glaciation have been the dominant processes which have created the tall peaks and deep valleys of the North Cascades area.

== See also ==
- Geography of Washington (state)
- Geology of the Pacific Northwest
