= Gilbert Mountain =

Mountain in Washington (state), United States

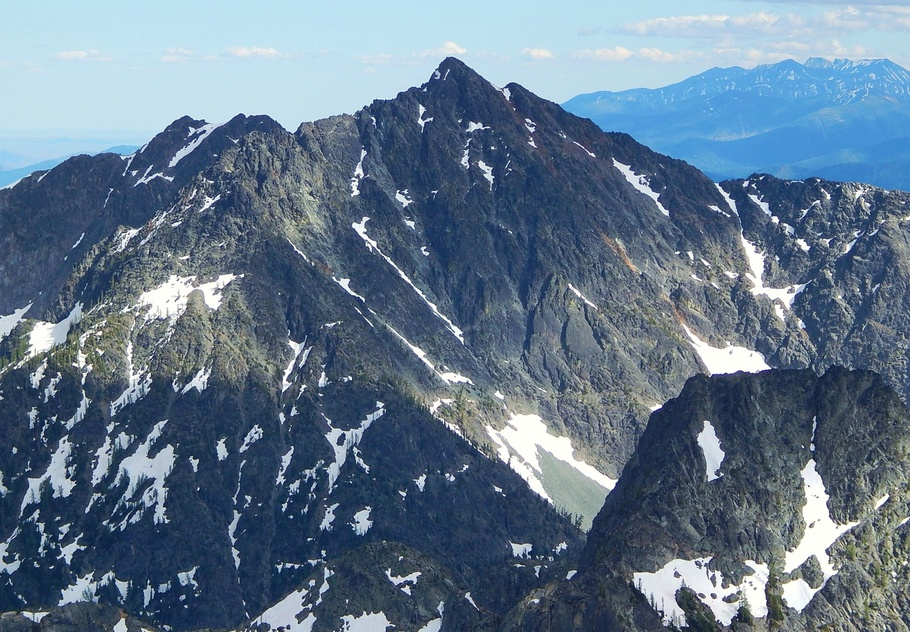
- Gilbert Mountain seen from Wallaby Peak

Highest point
- Elevation: 8,023 ft (2,445 m)
- Prominence: 1,063 ft (324 m)
- Parent peak: Kangaroo Ridge (8,300 ft)
- Isolation: 2.6 mi (4.2 km)
- Coordinates: 48°28′51″N 120°34′52″W

Geography
- Location within Washington (state) Location within the United States
- Interactive map of Gilbert Mountain
- Country: United States
- State: Washington
- County: Okanogan
- Protected area: Lake Chelan-Sawtooth Wilderness
- Parent range: Cascade Range; North Cascades; Methow Mountains
- Topo map: USGS Gilbert

Climbing
- Easiest route: scrambling

Gilbert Mountain is an 8,023-foot (2,445-metre) massif located in Okanogan County in Washington state. It is part of the Methow Mountains which are a subrange of the North Cascades. The mountain is situated within the Lake Chelan-Sawtooth Wilderness which is managed by Okanogan–Wenatchee National Forest. The northwestern extreme of the Gilbert massif connects to the southern end of Kangaroo Ridge. Precipitation runoff from the mountain drains into the Twisp River. Topographic relief is significant as it rises over 4,000 feet (1,200 meters) above the river in approximately one mile.

== Climate ==
Gilbert Mountain is located in the marine west coast climate zone of western North America. Weather fronts originating in the Pacific Ocean travel northeast toward the Cascade Mountains. As fronts approach the North Cascades, they are forced upward by the peaks of the Cascade Range (orographic lift), causing them to drop their moisture in the form of rain or snowfall onto the Cascades. As a result, the west side of the North Cascades experiences high precipitation, especially during the winter months in the form of snowfall. Because of maritime influence, snow tends to be wet and heavy, resulting in high avalanche danger. During winter months, weather is usually cloudy, but due to high pressure systems over the Pacific Ocean that intensify during summer months, there is often little or no cloud cover during the summer.

== Geology ==
The North Cascades features some of the most rugged topography in the Cascade Range with craggy peaks, ridges, and deep glacial valleys. Geological events occurring many years ago created the diverse topography and drastic elevation changes over the Cascade Range leading to the various climate differences. These climate differences lead to vegetation variety defining the ecoregions in this area.

The history of the formation of the Cascade Mountains dates back millions of years ago to the late Eocene Epoch. With the North American Plate overriding the Pacific Plate, episodes of volcanic igneous activity persisted. In addition, small fragments of the oceanic and continental lithosphere called terranes created the North Cascades about 50 million years ago.

During the Pleistocene period dating back over two million years ago, glaciation advancing and retreating repeatedly scoured the landscape leaving deposits of rock debris. The U-shaped cross section of the river valleys is a result of recent glaciation. Uplift and faulting in combination with glaciation have been the dominant processes which have created the tall peaks and deep valleys of the North Cascades area.

== See also ==
- Geography of the North Cascades
- List of mountain peaks of Washington (state)
