= Copper Benchmark =

Mountain in Washington (state), United States

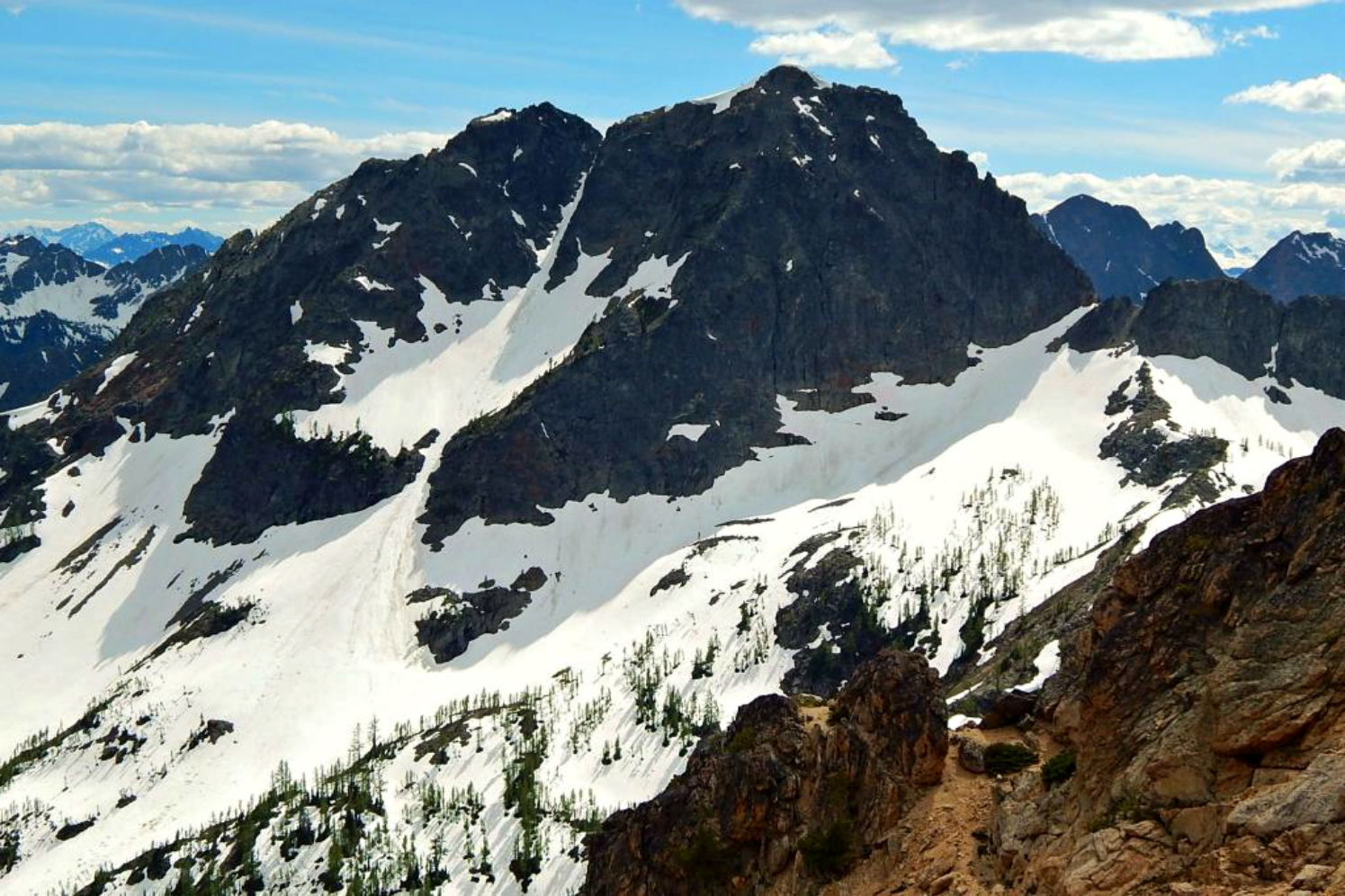
- Copper Benchmark seen from Wallaby Peak

Highest point
- Elevation: 7,844 ft (2,391 m)
- Prominence: 1,173 ft (358 m)
- Parent peak: Wallaby Peak
- Isolation: 0.9 mi (1.4 km)
- Coordinates: 48°29′49″N 120°37′43″W

Geography
- Location within Washington (state) Location within the United States
- Interactive map of Copper Benchmark
- Country: United States
- State: Washington
- County: Chelan / Okanogan
- Protected area: Lake Chelan-Sawtooth Wilderness
- Parent range: Cascade Range; North Cascades; Methow Mountains
- Topo map: USGS McAlester Mountain

Climbing
- Easiest route: Scrambling class 3

Copper Benchmark, also known as Copper Point, is a 7,844-foot-elevation (2,391-meter) mountain summit located on the shared border between Okanogan County and Chelan County in Washington state. Copper Benchmark is part of the Methow Mountains which are a subrange of the North Cascades, and it is situated on the crest of the Cascade Range between Kangaroo Pass and Copper Pass. It was used as a triangulation station for early surveying. It is protected by the Lake Chelan-Sawtooth Wilderness within the Okanogan–Wenatchee National Forest. Copper Benchmark has a subsidiary peak, Pica Peak (elevation 7,565 feet (2,306 m), which is 0.52 miles (0.84 km) northwest of the summit. The nearest higher peak is Wallaby Peak, 0.9 miles (1.4 km) to the northeast. Precipitation runoff on the north side of the mountain drains to the Methow River via Early Winters Creek, whereas the other sides of the mountain drain into tributaries of the Chelan River.

== Climate ==
Copper Benchmark is located in the marine west coast climate zone of western North America. Weather fronts originating in the Pacific Ocean travel northeast toward the Cascade Mountains. As fronts approach the North Cascades, they are forced upward by the peaks of the Cascade Range (orographic lift), causing them to drop their moisture in the form of rain or snowfall onto the Cascades. As a result, the west side of the North Cascades experiences high precipitation, especially during the winter months in the form of snowfall. Because of maritime influence, snow tends to be wet and heavy, resulting in avalanche danger. During winter months, weather is usually cloudy. However, due to high pressure systems over the Pacific Ocean that intensify during summer months, there is often little or no cloud cover during the summer.

== Geology ==
The North Cascades feature some of the most rugged topography in the Cascade Range with craggy peaks, ridges, and deep glacial valleys. Geological events occurring many years ago created the diverse topography and drastic elevation changes over the Cascade Range leading to the various climate differences. The history of the formation of the Cascade Mountains dates back millions of years ago to the late Eocene Epoch. With the North American Plate overriding the Pacific Plate, episodes of volcanic igneous activity persisted. In addition, small fragments of the oceanic and continental lithosphere called terranes created the North Cascades about 50 million years ago.

During the Pleistocene period dating back over two million years ago, glaciation advancing and retreating repeatedly scoured the landscape leaving deposits of rock debris. The U-shaped cross section of the river valleys is a result of recent glaciation. Uplift and faulting in combination with glaciation have been the dominant processes which have created the tall peaks and deep valleys of the North Cascades area.

== Gallery ==
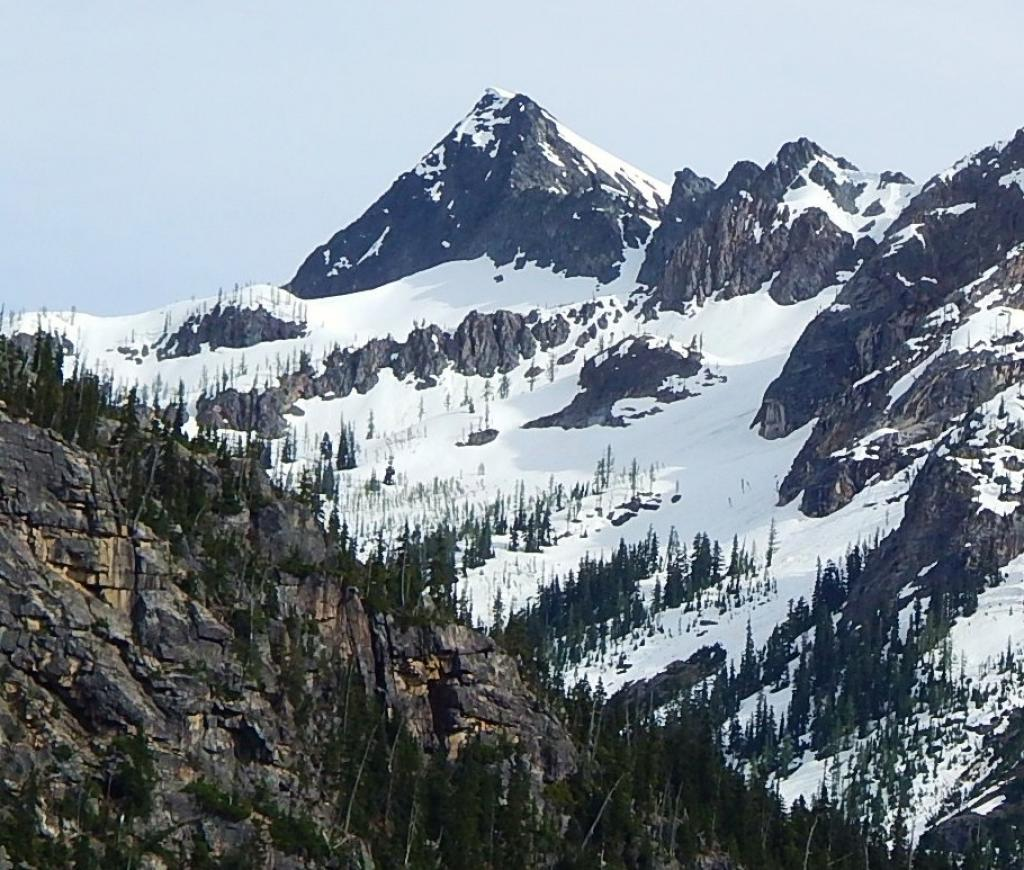
Copper Point, from North Cascades Highway

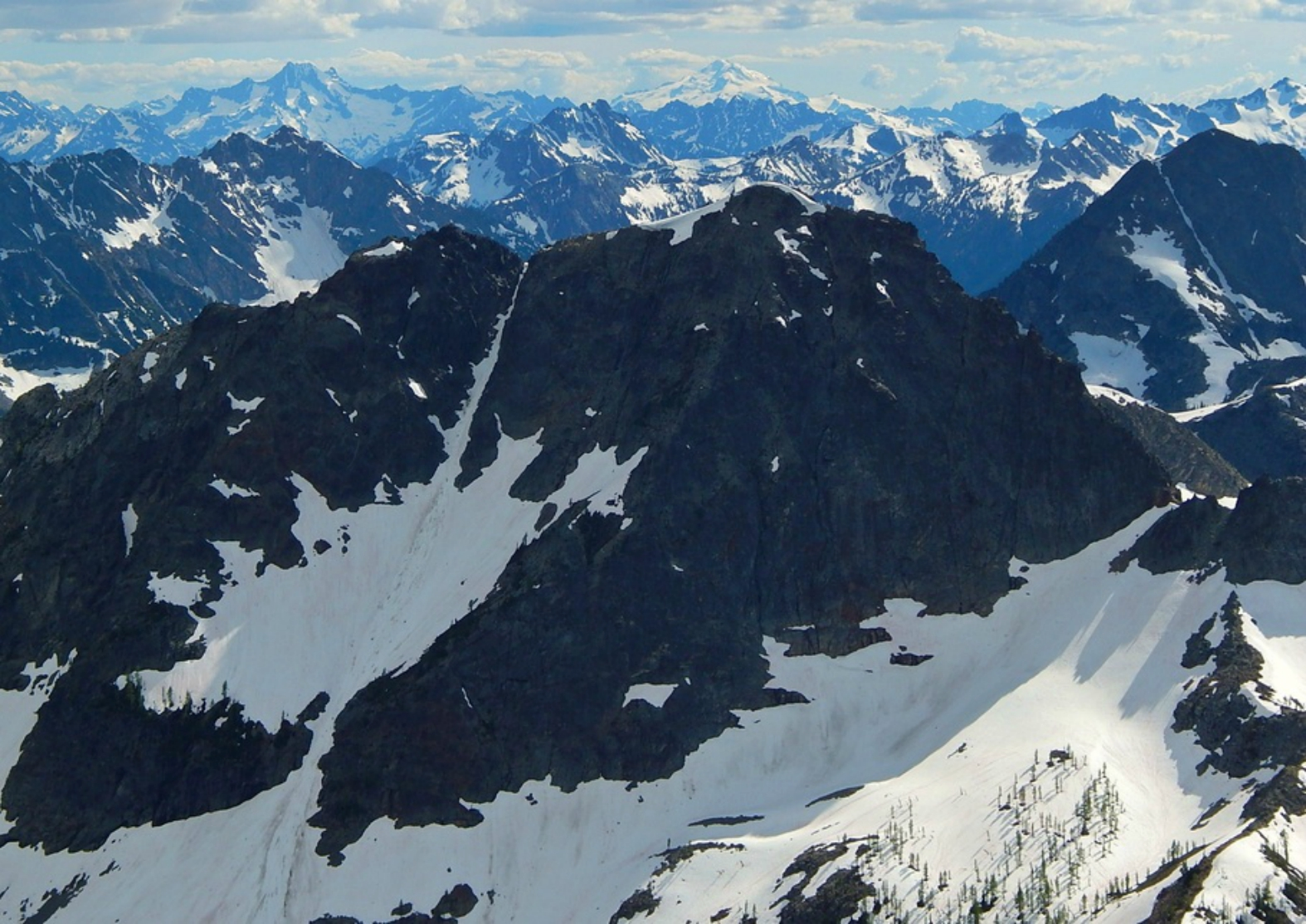
Copper Benchmark seen from Wallaby Peak

== See also ==
- Geography of the North Cascades
- Geology of the Pacific Northwest
