= Pica Peak =

Mountain in Washington (state), United States

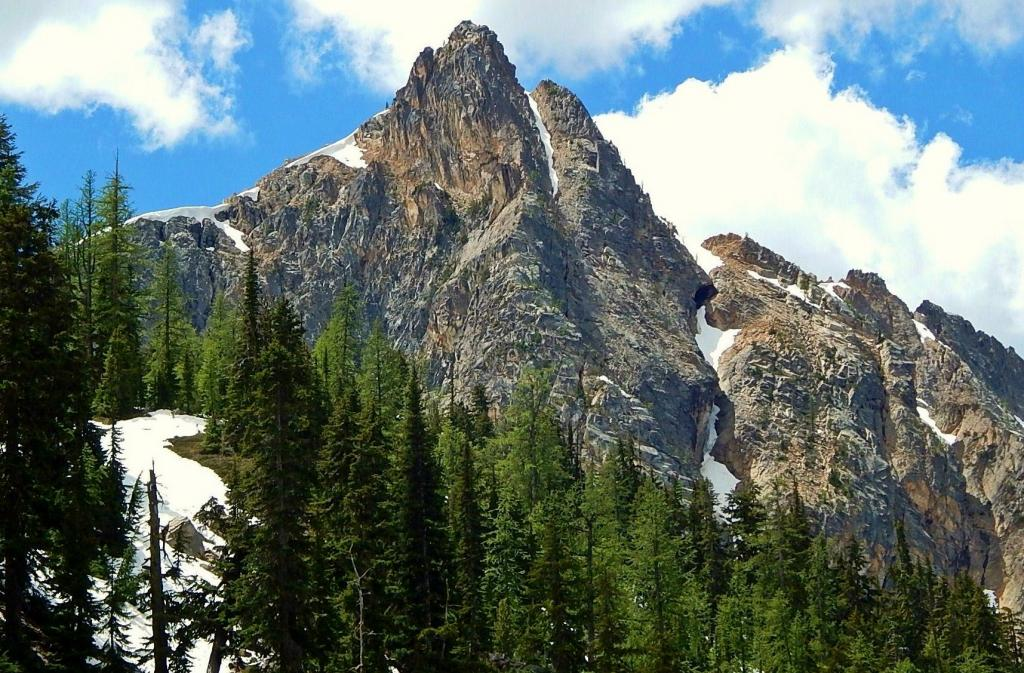
- Pica Peak, northeast aspect

Highest point
- Elevation: 7,565 ft (2,306 m)
- Prominence: 125 ft (38 m)
- Parent peak: Blue Lake Peak (7,840 ft)
- Isolation: 0.75 mi (1.21 km)
- Coordinates: 48°30′08″N 120°38′17″W

Geography
- Location within Washington (state) Location within the United States
- Interactive map of Pica Peak
- Location: Okanogan / Chelan counties Washington, U.S.
- Parent range: North Cascades; Cascade Range
- Topo map: USGS Washington Pass

Climbing
- Easiest route: class 3 scrambling

Pica Peak is a 7,565-foot (2,306-metre) summit located in the Methow Mountains, a subset of the North Cascades, on the shared border between Okanogan County and Chelan County in Washington state. Pica Peak is situated 1.7 mi (2.7 km) southeast of Washington Pass, within the Okanogan-Wenatchee National Forest. The nearest higher neighbor is Copper Benchmark, 0.58 miles (0.93 km) to the southeast, and Blue Lake Peak is set 0.93 miles (1.50 km) to the west-northwest. Although modest in prominence, relief is significant as the peak rises 2,000 feet above Early Winters Basin in only 0.5 mi (1 km). Precipitation runoff on the north side of the mountain drains to the Methow River via Early Winters Creek, whereas the south side of the mountain drains into tributaries of the Stehekin River.

== Climate ==
Most weather fronts originate in the Pacific Ocean, and travel northeast toward the Cascade Mountains. As fronts approach the North Cascades, they are forced upward by the peaks of the Cascade Range (Orographic lift), causing them to drop their moisture in the form of rain or snowfall onto the Cascades. As a result, the west side of the North Cascades experiences high precipitation, especially during the winter months in the form of snowfall. During winter months, weather is usually cloudy, but, due to high pressure systems over the Pacific Ocean that intensify during summer months, there is often little or no cloud cover during the summer. The months July through September offer the most favorable weather for viewing or climbing this peak.

== Geology ==
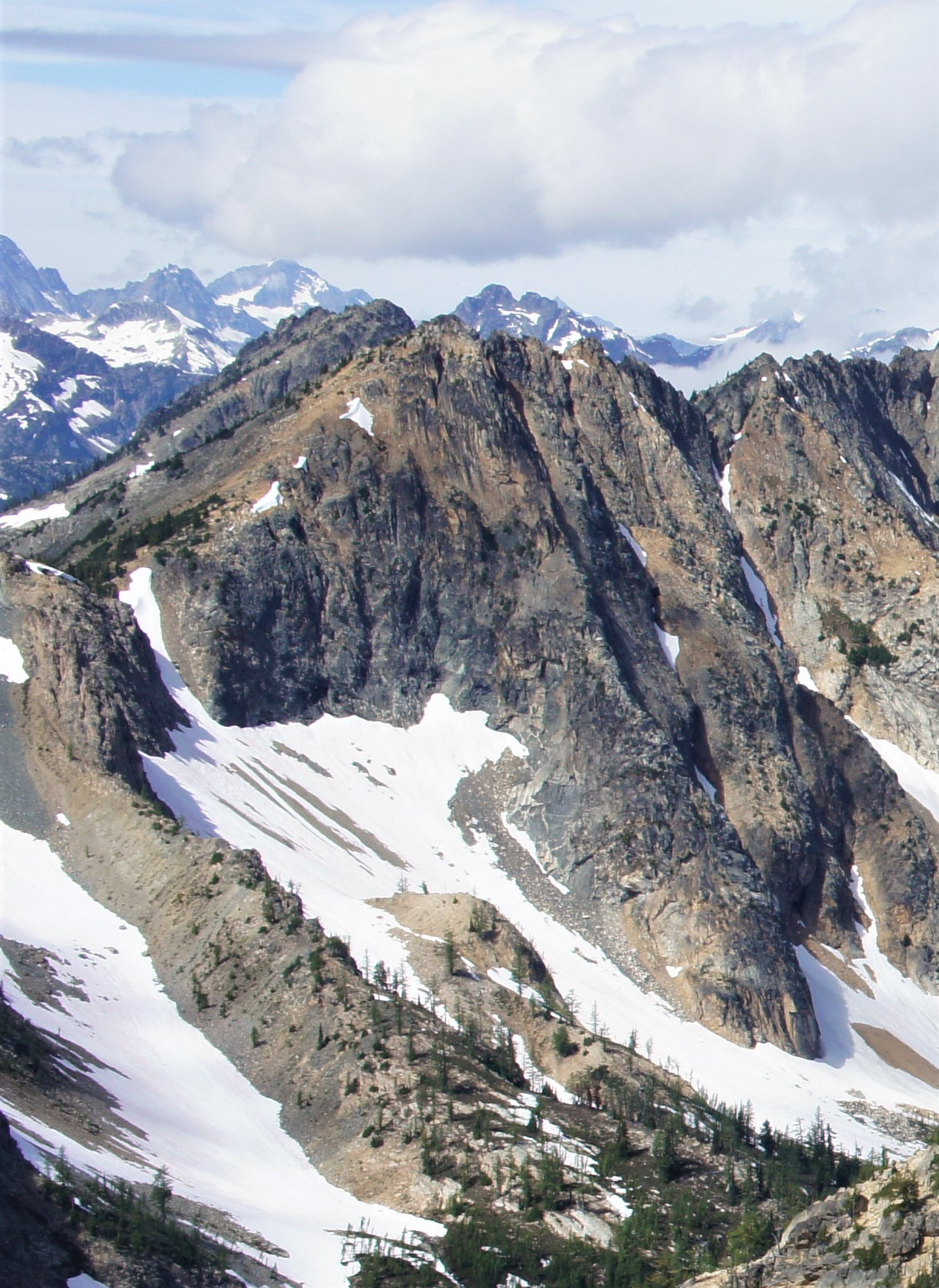
Pica Peak from ENE

The North Cascades feature some of the most rugged topography in the Cascade Range with craggy peaks, ridges, and deep glacial valleys. Geological events occurring many years ago created the diverse topography and drastic elevation changes over the Cascade Range leading to the various climate differences. The history of the formation of the Cascade Mountains dates back millions of years ago to the late Eocene Epoch. With the North American Plate overriding the Pacific Plate, episodes of volcanic igneous activity persisted. In addition, small fragments of the oceanic and continental lithosphere called terranes created the North Cascades about 50 million years ago.

During the Pleistocene period dating back over two million years ago, glaciation advancing and retreating repeatedly scoured the landscape leaving deposits of rock debris. The U-shaped cross section of the river valleys is a result of recent glaciation. Uplift and faulting in combination with glaciation have been the dominant processes which have created the tall peaks and deep valleys of the North Cascades area.

== Gallery ==
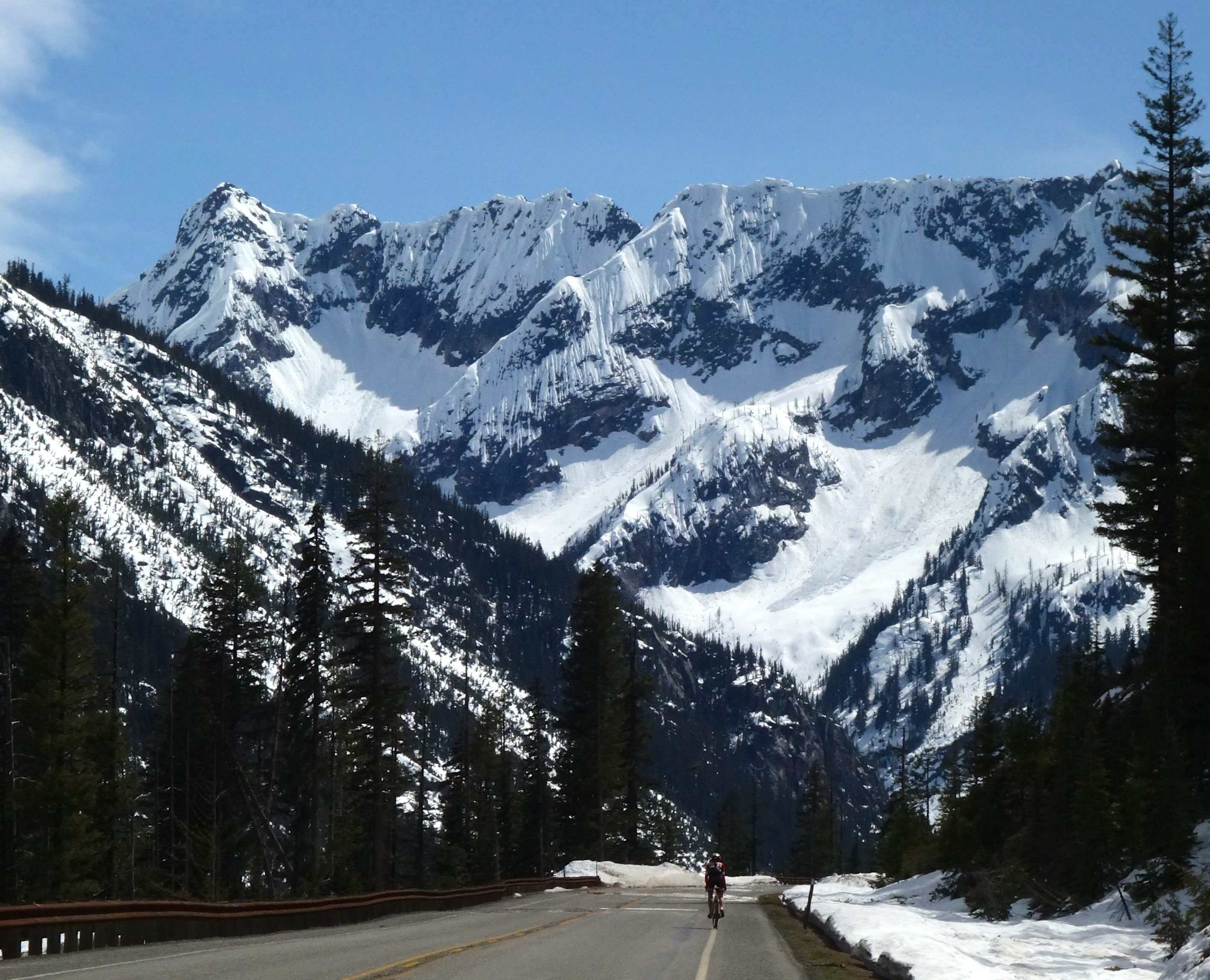
Pica in upper left corner

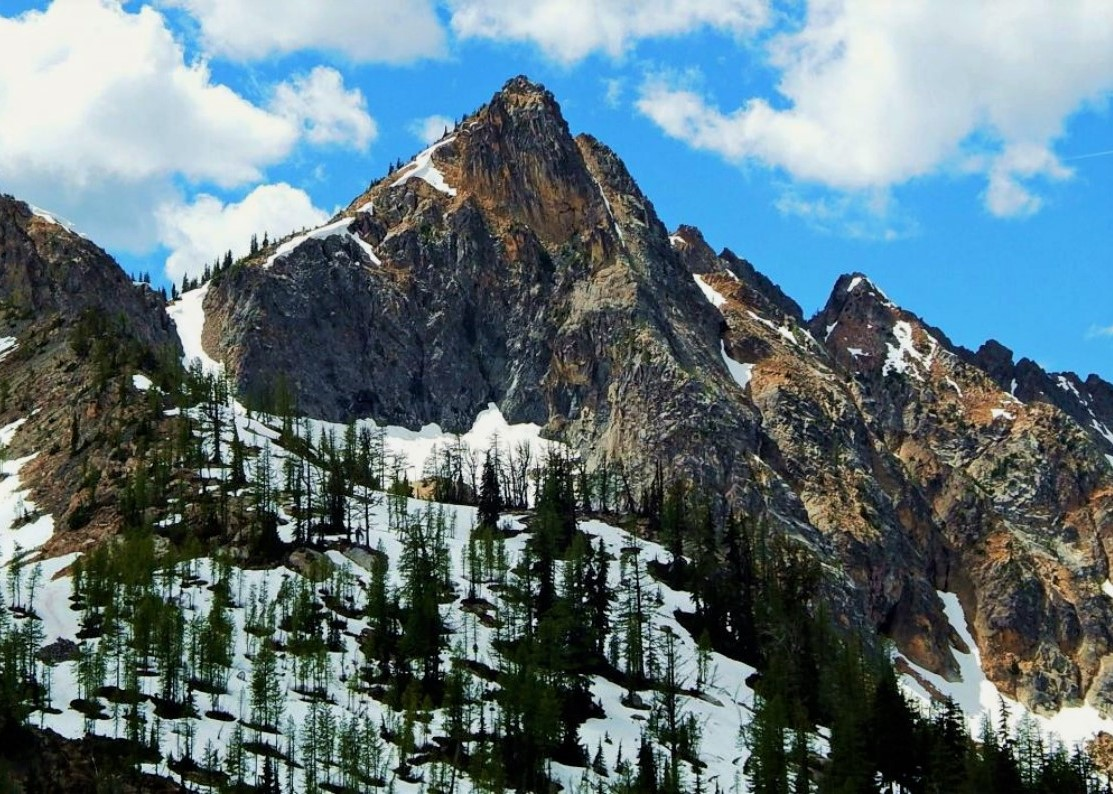

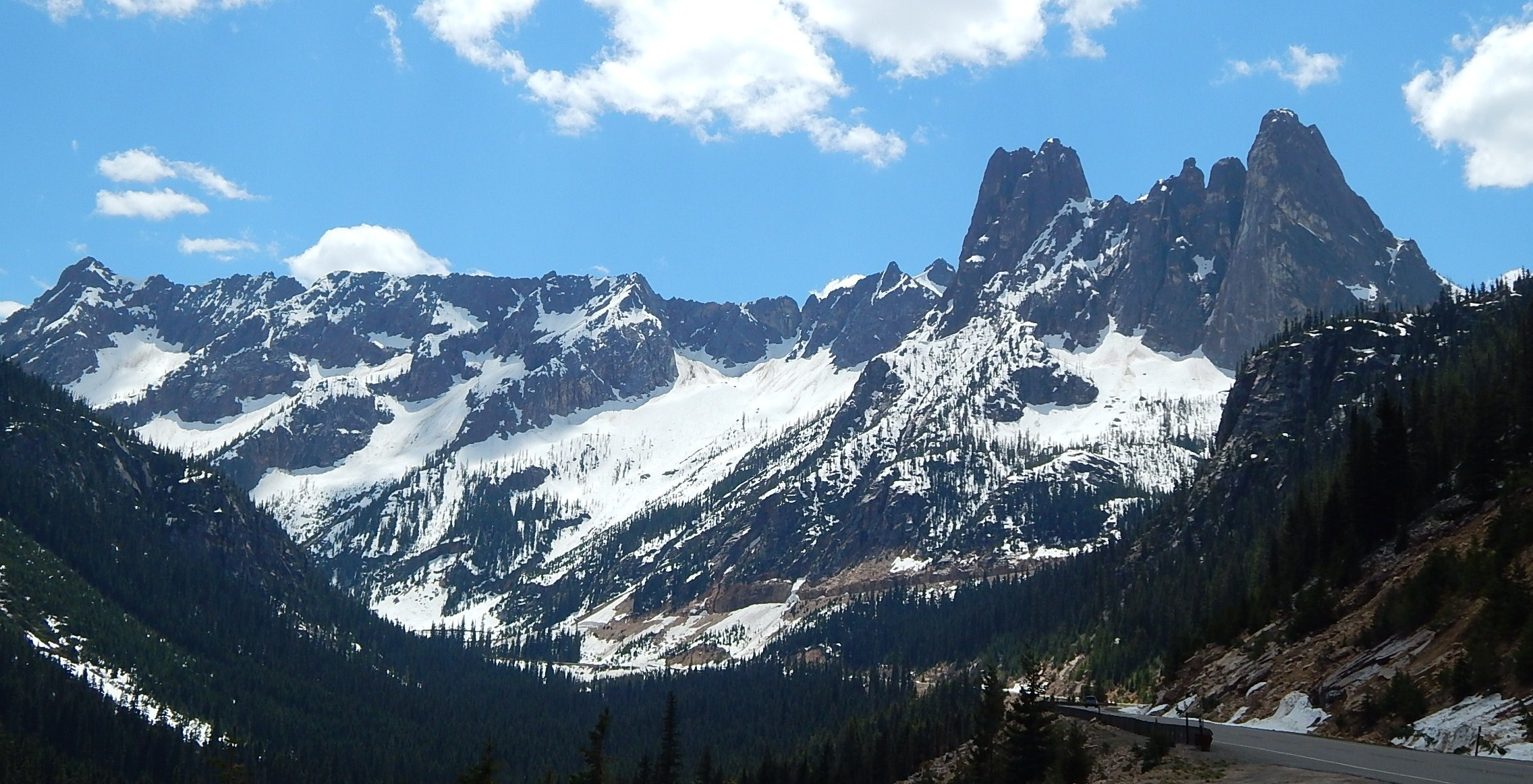
Pica Peak at left edge, from North Cascades Highway

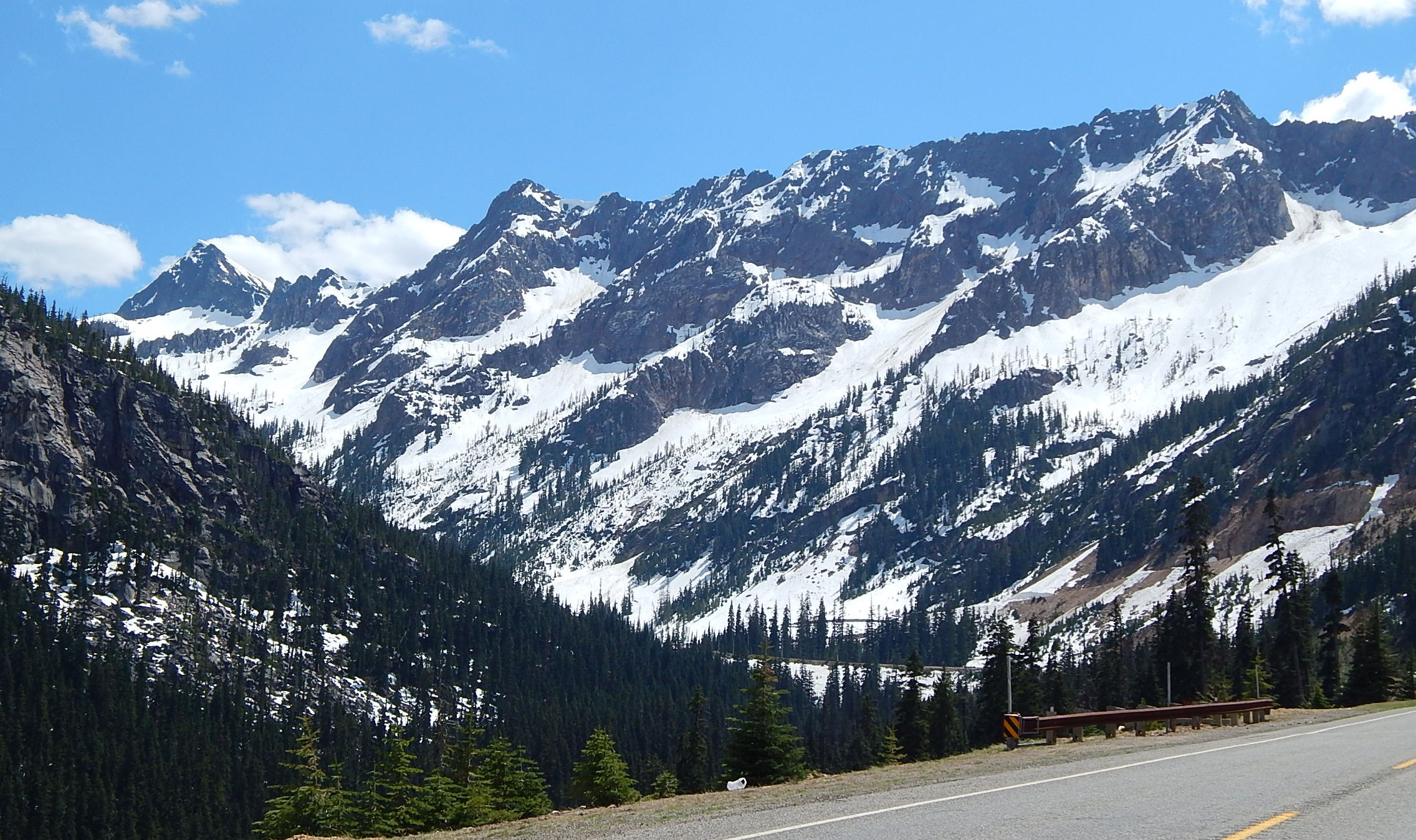

== See also ==
- Geography of the North Cascades
