= Star Peak (Washington) =

Mountain in the North Cascades, Washington

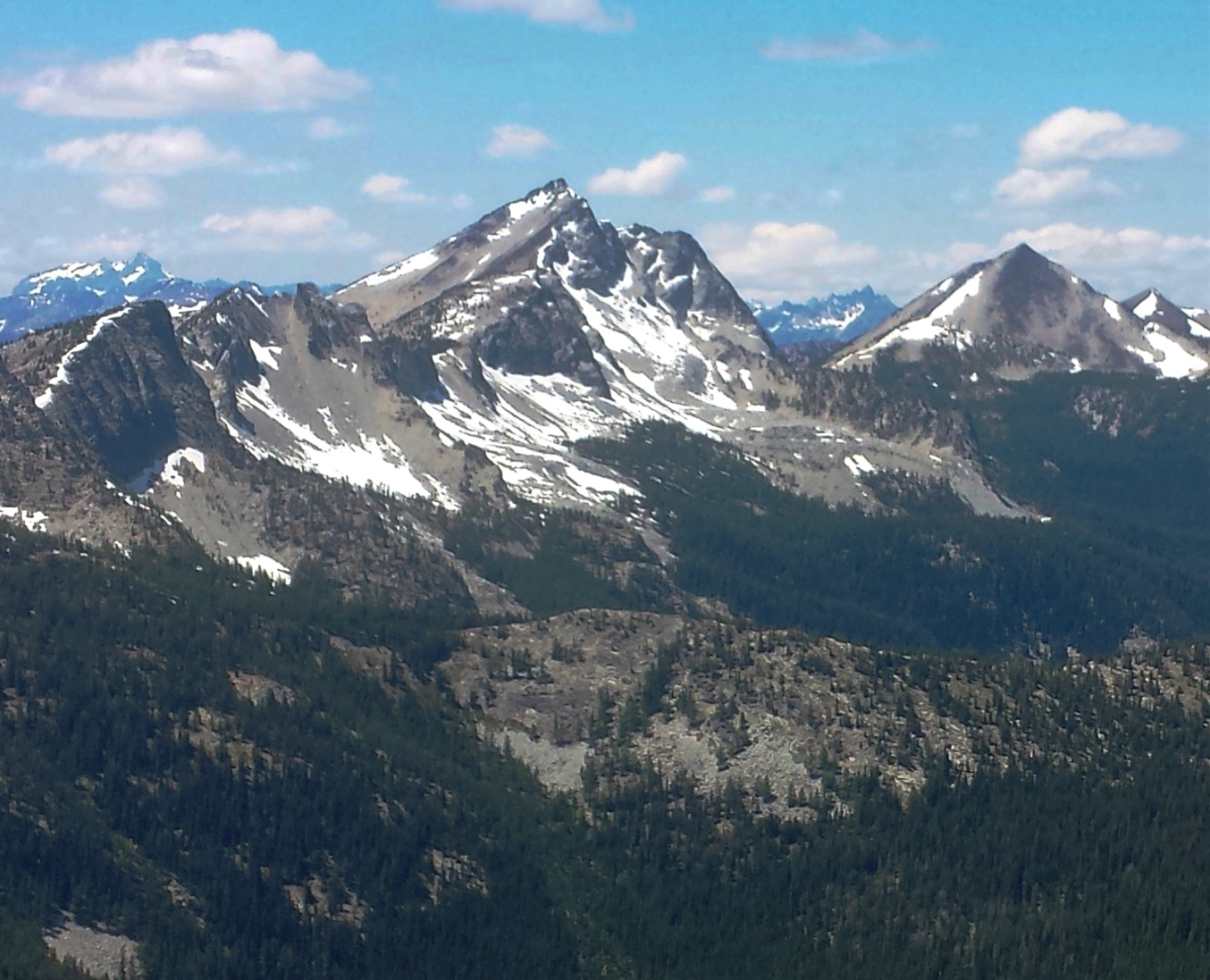
- Star Peak seen from Hoodoo Peak (Courtney Peak to right)

Highest point
- Elevation: 8,693 ft (2,650 m)
- Prominence: 1,198 ft (365 m)
- Parent peak: Oval Peak
- Isolation: 2.52 mi (4.06 km)
- Coordinates: 48°15′03″N 120°25′43″W

Geography
- Location within Washington (state) Location within the United States
- Interactive map of Star Peak
- Country: United States
- State: Washington
- County: Chelan / Okanogan
- Protected area: Lake Chelan-Sawtooth Wilderness
- Parent range: Cascade Range; North Cascades; Methow Mountains
- Topo map: USGS Oval Peak

Geology
- Rock age: Eocene to Late Cretaceous
- Rock type: Tonalitic Orthogneiss

Climbing
- First ascent: 1898 by Survey Party including Albert Hale Sylvester
- Easiest route: Scrambling

Star Peak is an 8,693-foot (2,650-metre) mountain summit located in the Methow Mountains, a sub-range of the North Cascades in Washington state. The peak is the highest point on Sawtooth Ridge, and the 35th-highest peak in the state. The nearest higher peak is Oval Peak, 2.52 miles (4.06 km) to the north. It is protected by the Lake Chelan-Sawtooth Wilderness within the Okanogan–Wenatchee National Forest. Precipitation runoff on the south side of the mountain drains into Lake Chelan via Prince Creek, whereas the north side of the mountain drains into Buttermilk Creek which is a tributary of the Twisp River.

== Climate ==
According to the Köppen climate classification system, Star Peak has an alpine climate. Lying east of the Cascade crest, the area around Star Peak is a bit drier than areas to the west. Summers can bring warm temperatures and occasional thunderstorms. With its impressive height, Star Peak can have snow on it in late-spring and early-fall, and can be very cold in the winter.

== Geology ==
The North Cascades features some of the most rugged topography in the Cascade Range with craggy peaks, ridges, and deep glacial valleys. Geological events occurring many years ago created the diverse topography and drastic elevation changes over the Cascade Range leading to the various climate differences. These climate differences lead to vegetation variety defining the ecoregions in this area.

The history of the formation of the Cascade Mountains dates back millions of years ago to the late Eocene Epoch. With the North American Plate overriding the Pacific Plate, episodes of volcanic igneous activity persisted. In addition, small fragments of the oceanic and continental lithosphere called terranes created the North Cascades about 50 million years ago.

During the Pleistocene period dating back over two million years ago, glaciation advancing and retreating repeatedly scoured the landscape leaving deposits of rock debris. The U-shaped cross section of the river valleys is a result of recent glaciation. Uplift and faulting in combination with glaciation have been the dominant processes which have created the tall peaks and deep valleys of the North Cascades area.

== Gallery ==
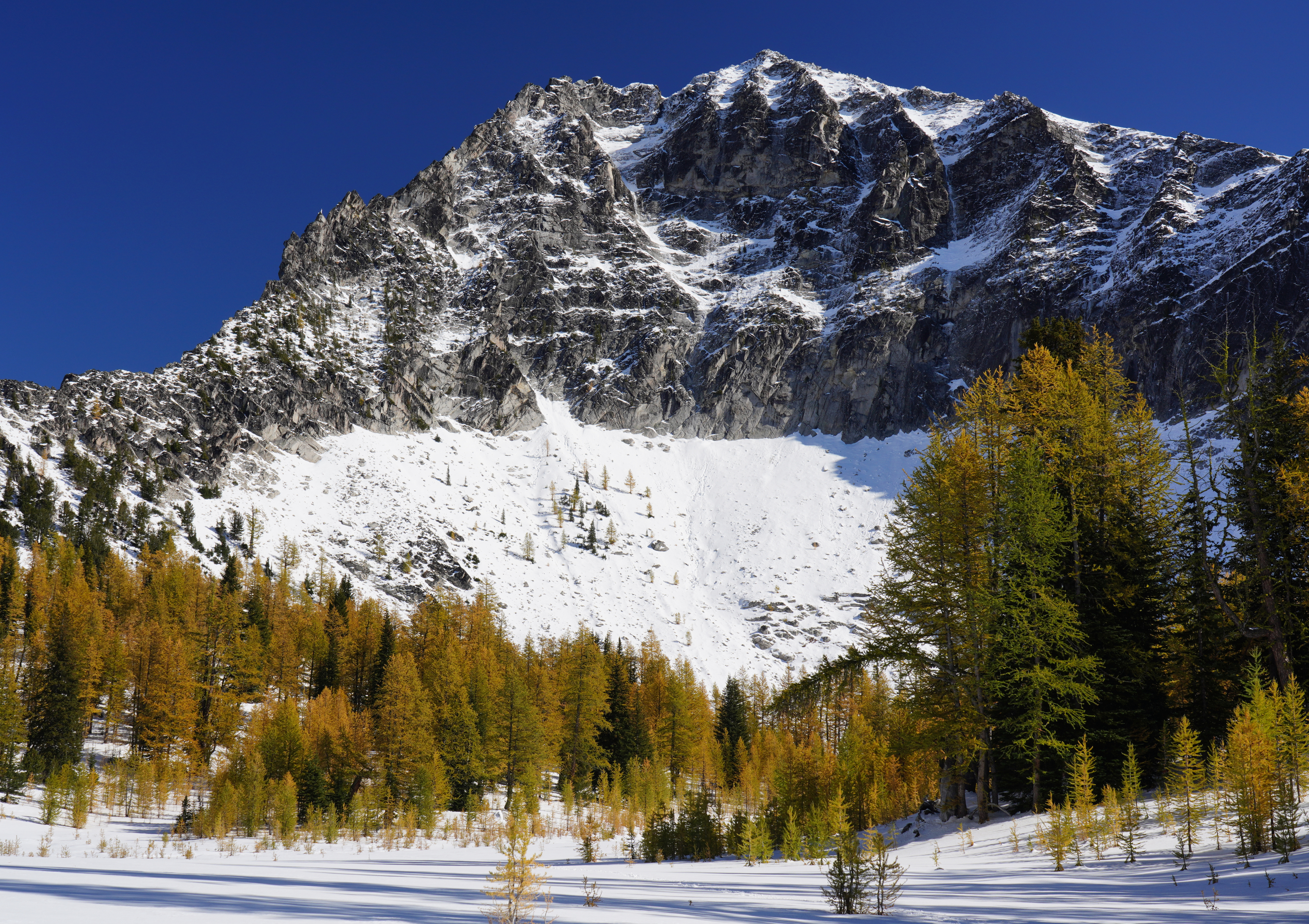
Star Peak

== See also ==
- Geography of the North Cascades
- List of mountain peaks of Washington (state)
