= Oval Peak =

Mountain in Washington (state), United States

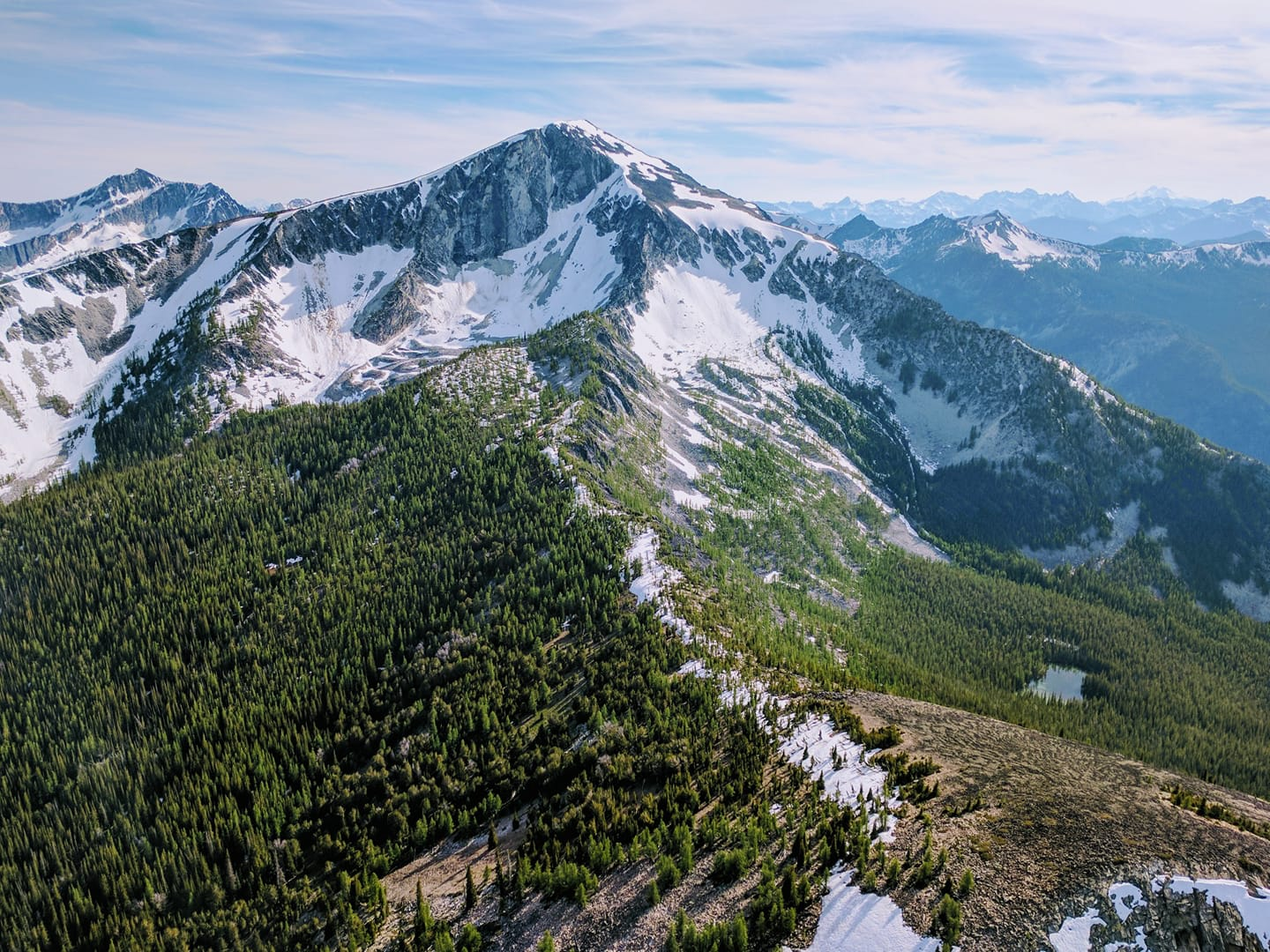
- Oval Peak seen from the east

Highest point
- Elevation: 8,800 ft (2,682 m) NAVD 88
- Prominence: 2,731 ft (832 m)
- Isolation: 15.46 mi (24.88 km)
- Coordinates: 48°17′14″N 120°25′31″W

Geography
- Location within Washington (state) Location within the United States
- Interactive map of Oval Peak
- Location: Okanogan County, Washington, U.S.
- Parent range: North Cascades
- Topo map: USGS Oval Peak

Climbing
- Easiest route: Hiking class 2 via South Slope

Oval Peak is an 8,800-foot (2,700-metre) mountain in the North Cascades of Washington state. It is protected by the Lake Chelan-Sawtooth Wilderness within the Okanogan–Wenatchee National Forest. Oval Peak is the highest summit in the Methow Mountains, a subrange of the North Cascades. Oval Peak has a small rock glacier on its slopes.

Climbing Oval Peak can be difficult due to the amount of talus on its slopes. There is a summit register at the peak.

== Climate ==
Lying east of the Cascade crest, the area around Oval Peak is a bit drier than areas to the west. Summers can bring warm temperatures and occasional thunderstorms. With its impressive height, Oval Peak can have snow on it in late-Spring and early-Fall, and can be very cold in the winter. The best time to climb Oval Peak is early July through October. Precipitation runoff from the mountain drains into Oval Creek and Buttermilk Creek, which are both tributaries of the Twisp River.

== Geology ==
The history of the formation of the Cascade Mountains dates back millions of years ago to the late Eocene Epoch. With the North American Plate overriding the Pacific Plate, episodes of volcanic igneous activity persisted. In addition, small fragments of the oceanic and continental lithosphere called terranes created the North Cascades about 50 million years ago.

During the Pleistocene period dating back over two million years ago, glaciation advancing and retreating repeatedly scoured the landscape leaving deposits of rock debris. The U-shaped cross section of the river valleys is a result of recent glaciation. Uplift and faulting in combination with glaciation have been the dominant processes which have created the tall peaks and deep valleys of the North Cascades area.

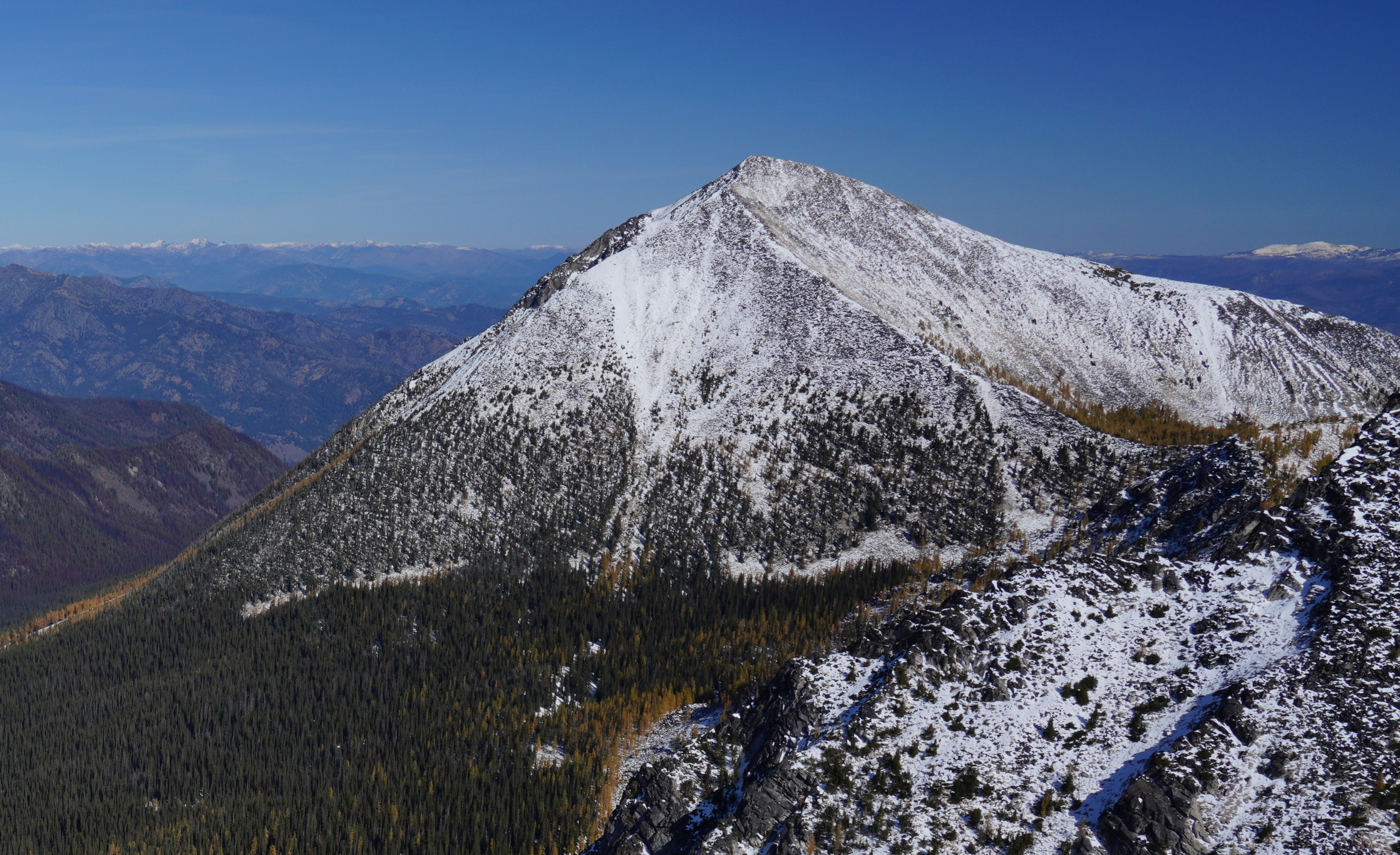
Oval Peak seen from Courtney Peak

== See also ==
- List of mountain peaks of Washington (state)
