= Courtney Peak (Washington) =

Mountain in Washington (state), United States

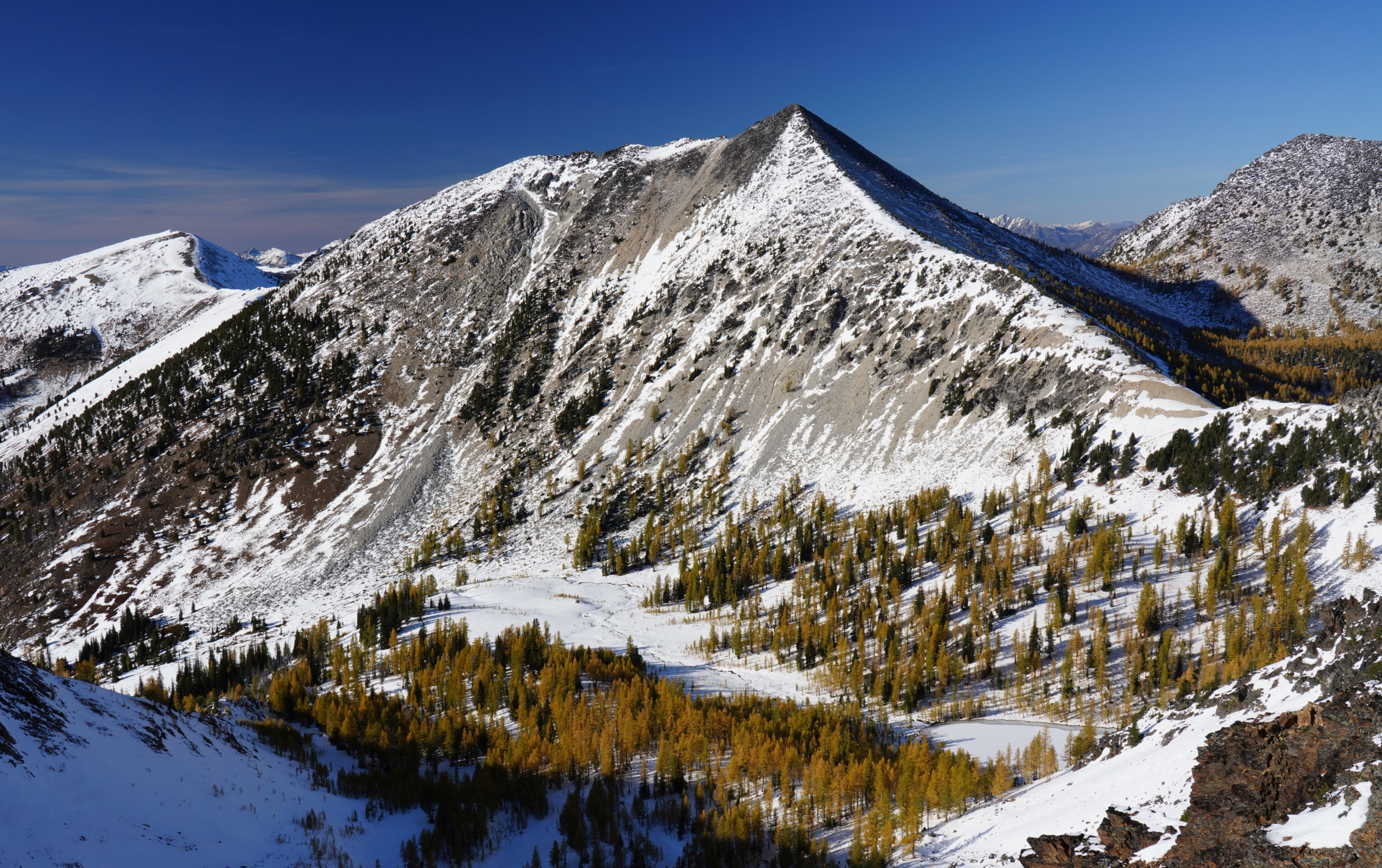
- Courtney Peak, south aspect

Highest point
- Elevation: 8,394 ft (2,558 m)
- Prominence: 800 ft (244 m)
- Parent peak: Star Peak (8,690 ft)
- Isolation: 0.83 mi (1.34 km)
- Coordinates: 48°15′39″N 120°26′37″W

Geography
- Location within Washington (state) Location within the United States
- Interactive map of Courtney Peak
- Country: United States
- State: Washington
- County: Chelan / Okanogan
- Protected area: Lake Chelan-Sawtooth Wilderness
- Parent range: Cascade Range; North Cascades; Methow Mountains
- Topo map: USGS Oval Peak

Geology
- Rock age: Eocene to Late Cretaceous
- Rock type: Tonalitic Orthogneiss

Climbing
- First ascent: Unknown
- Easiest route: Southeast Ridge class 2

Courtney Peak is an 8,394-foot (2,558-metre) mountain summit located in the Methow Mountains which are a sub-range of the North Cascades in Washington state. Situated on Sawtooth Ridge, Courtney Peak is part of the Lake Chelan-Sawtooth Wilderness, a protected area within the Okanogan–Wenatchee National Forest. Courtney Peak ranks 80th on Washington's highest 100 peaks, and 81st on the "Bulger List". The nearest higher peak is Star Peak, 0.83 miles (1.34 km) to the southeast. Precipitation runoff on the west side of the mountain drains into nearby Lake Chelan via Fish Creek, whereas the north side of the mountain drains into Oval Creek, and the east side drains into Buttermilk Creek, both of which are tributaries of the Twisp River. The mountain's name was officially adopted in 1985 to remember James (Ray) Courtney (1920-1982), a commercial packer and lifelong resident of Stehekin. The immediate vicinity of this peak was a favorite destination for his guided outings. Ray Courtney died in an accident while leading such a pack trip with 29 hikers when the horse he was riding lost its footing and fell down a gully.

== Climate ==
Lying east of the Cascade crest, the area around Courtney Peak is a bit drier than areas to the west. Summers can bring warm temperatures and occasional thunderstorms. Weather fronts originating in the Pacific Ocean travel northeast toward the Cascade Mountains. As fronts approach the North Cascades, they are forced upward by the peaks (orographic lift), causing them to drop their moisture in the form of rain or snowfall onto the Cascades. As a result, the North Cascades experiences high precipitation, especially during the winter months in the form of snowfall. With its impressive height, Courtney Peak can have snow on it in late-spring and early-fall, and can be very cold in the winter.

== Geology ==
The North Cascades features some of the most rugged topography in the Cascade Range with craggy peaks, ridges, and deep glacial valleys. Geological events occurring many years ago created the diverse topography and drastic elevation changes over the Cascade Range leading to the various climate differences. These climate differences lead to vegetation variety defining the ecoregions in this area.

The history of the formation of the Cascade Mountains dates back millions of years ago to the late Eocene Epoch. With the North American Plate overriding the Pacific Plate, episodes of volcanic igneous activity persisted. In addition, small fragments of the oceanic and continental lithosphere called terranes created the North Cascades about 50 million years ago.

During the Pleistocene period dating back over two million years ago, glaciation advancing and retreating repeatedly scoured the landscape leaving deposits of rock debris. The U-shaped cross section of the river valleys is a result of recent glaciation. Uplift and faulting in combination with glaciation have been the dominant processes which have created the tall peaks and deep valleys of the North Cascades area.

== Gallery ==
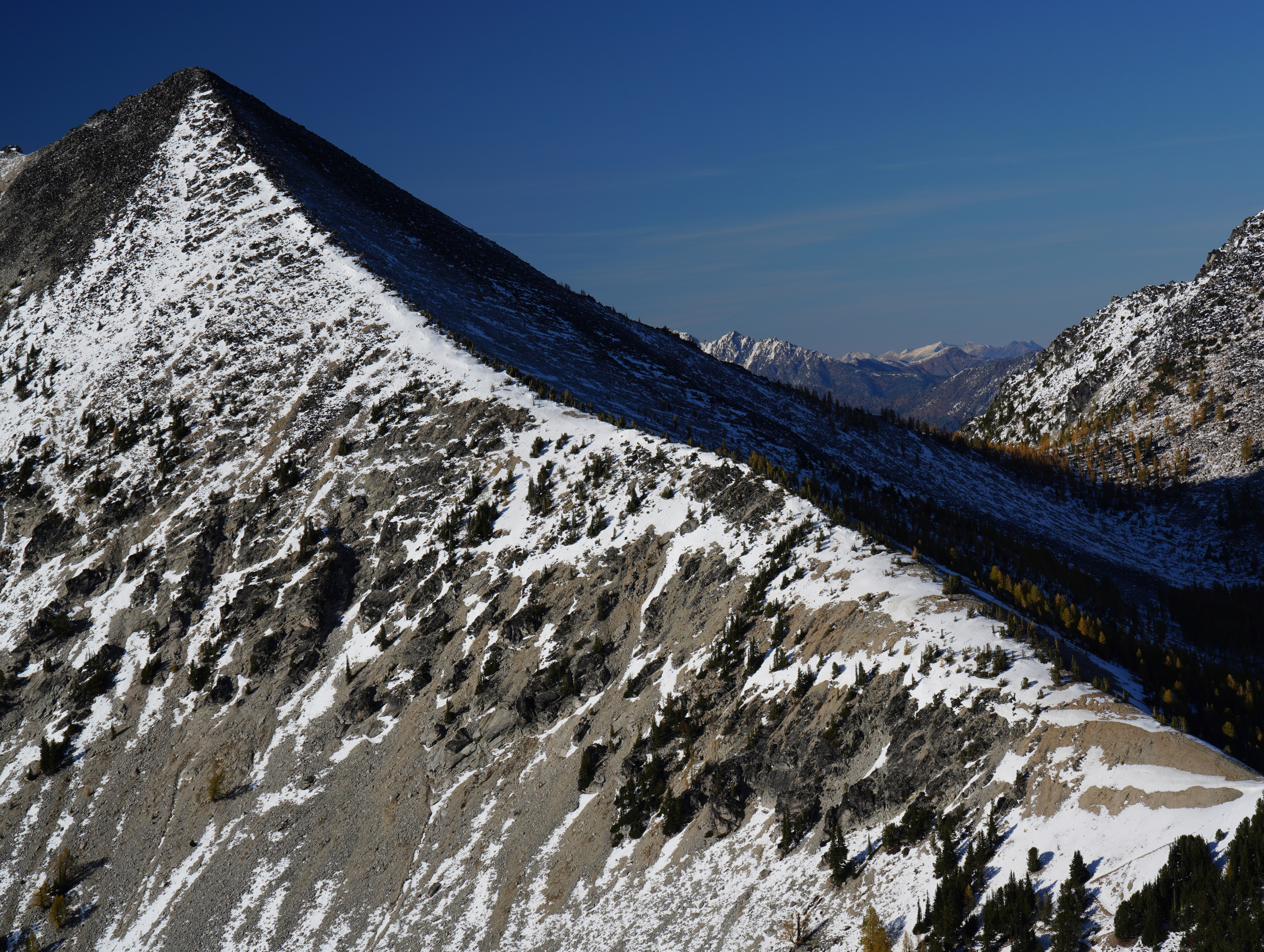
Southeast ridge of Courtney

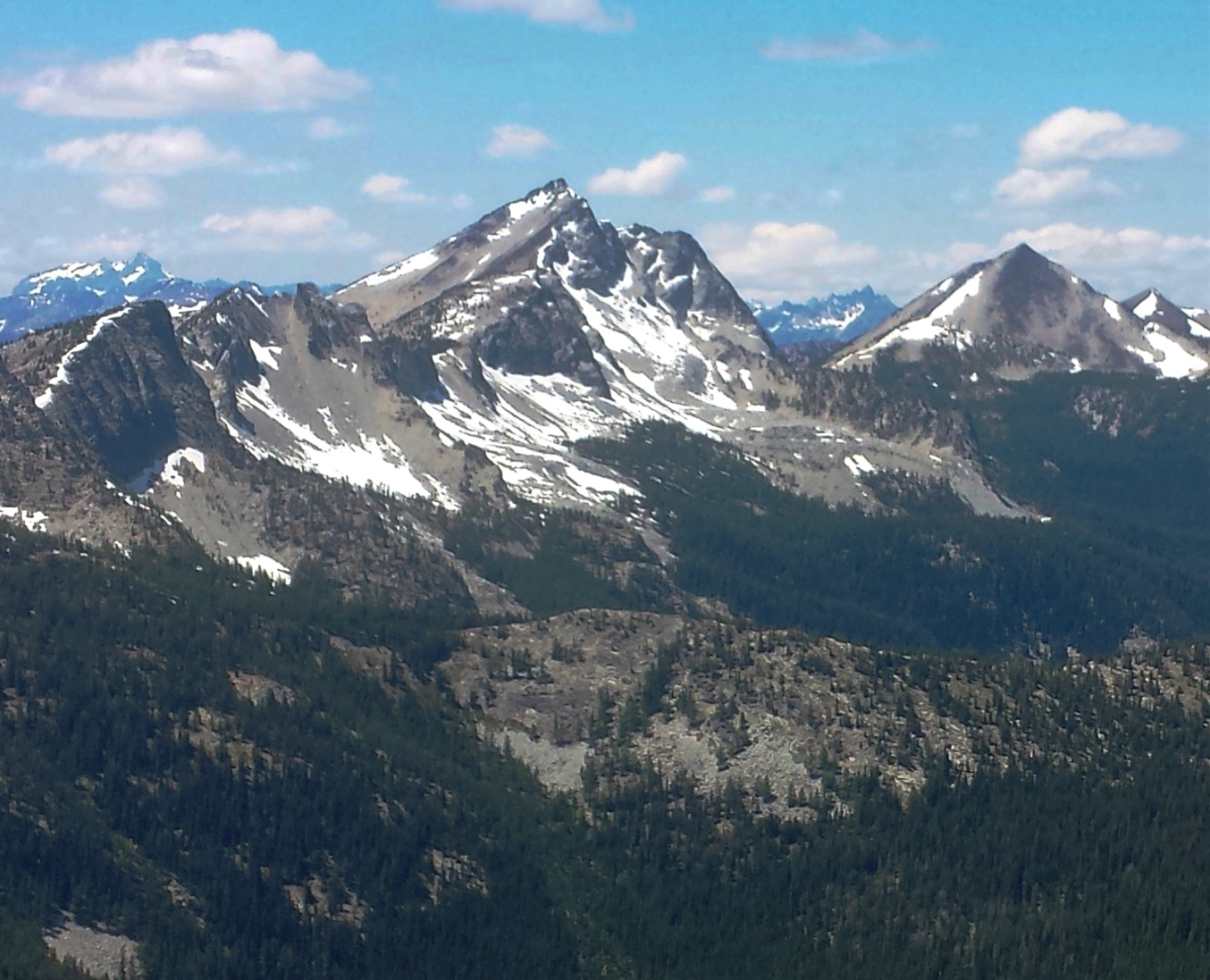
Star Peak centered with Courtney Peak to right

== See also ==
- List of Highest Mountain Peaks in Washington
- Geography of Washington (state)
- Geology of the Pacific Northwest
