= Twisp River =

River in the United States of America

- Location of the mouth of the Twisp River in Washington Twisp River (the United States)

Location
- Country: United States
- State: Washington
- County: Okanogan

Physical characteristics
- Source: Cascade Range
  - coordinates: 48°27′47″N 120°36′4″W
- Mouth: Methow River
  - coordinates: 48°22′6″N 120°7′6″W
  - elevation: 1,575 ft (480 m)
- Length: 26 mi (42 km)

The Twisp River is a tributary of the Methow River, in the U.S. state of Washington. It is about 26 miles (42 km) long. The name of the river comes from the Okanagan placename [tx^{w}ə́c’p], perhaps meaning "wasp" or "yellowjacket".

== Course ==
The Twisp River originates in the North Cascades portion of the Cascade Range. Flowing generally east, the Twisp River drains the mountains south of Washington Pass as well as the eastern slopes of Sawtooth Ridge, a major mountain range with some of Washington state's highest peaks (such as Star Peak and Mt Bigelow).

The Twisp River flows into the Methow River at the town of Twisp, Washington.

== Trivia ==
A Japanese incendiary balloon was reported on the Twisp River in 1945.

== Tributaries ==
(In order of Source to Mouth)

- North Fork Twisp River
- South Fork Twisp River

=== Left ===
- North Creek
- Scatter Creek
- Whistling Creek
- Little Slate Creek
- Cook Creek
- lime Creek
- Canyon Creek
- Bridge Creek
- Coal Creek
- Myer Creek

=== Right ===
- South Creek
- Reynolds Creek
- Williams Creek
- War Creek
- Eagle Creek
- Scaffold Creek
- Buttermilk Creek
- Newby Creek
- Poorman Creek

== See also ==
- List of rivers of Washington (state)
- Tributaries of the Columbia River
