= Lake Chelan-Sawtooth Wilderness =

Protected wilderness area in the state of Washington

- IUCN category Ib (wilderness area)
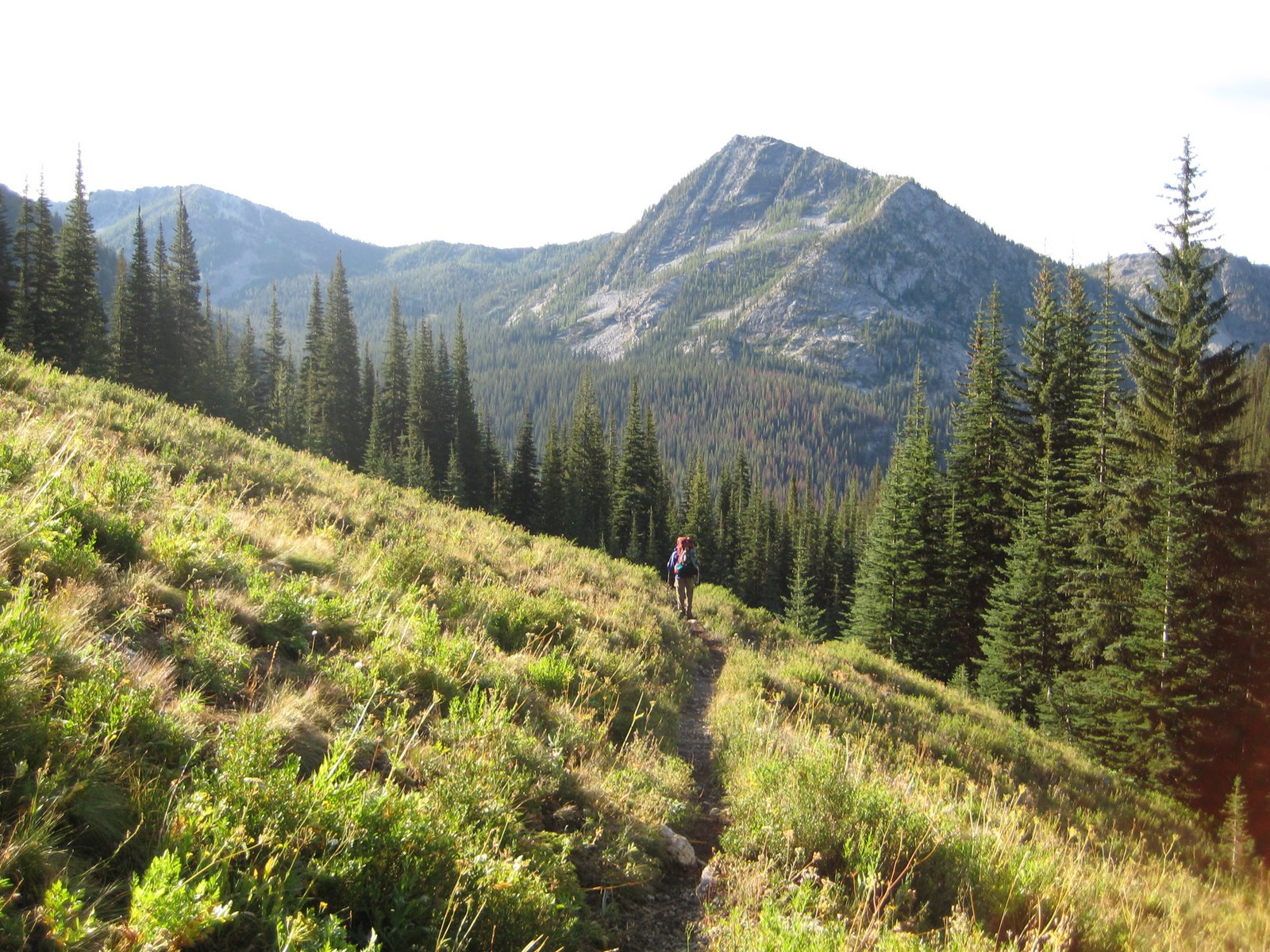
- A backpacker on the Prince Creek Trail

- Location within the United States
- Location: Okanogan / Chelan counties, Washington, U.S.
- Nearest city: Twisp, Washington
- Coordinates: 48°20′06″N 120°28′52″W
- Area: 153,057 acres (619.40 km^{2})
- Established: 1984
- Governing body: U.S. Forest Service
- Website: Lake Chelan-Sawtooth Wilderness

The Lake Chelan-Sawtooth Wilderness is a 153,057-acre (61,940 ha) protected wilderness area located within the Okanogan and Wenatchee national forests in Washington State. The wilderness borders Lake Chelan National Recreation Area and North Cascades National Park and the Stephen Mather Wilderness to the northwest. It was designated with the passage of the Washington Wilderness Act of 1984, on lands occupied by the old Chelan Division of the Washington Forest Reserve, now part of both the Okanogan and Wenatchee national forests.

== Habitat ==
There are 63 lakes, many too small to have ever been named, often located in the high country without trail access. The wilderness encompasses a diverse mixture of dense forest, meadows, alpine slopes, geology, and high country. The open forest below tree line is home to bears and mule deer. Snow often covers much of the area from mid or late October through late June.

== Trails ==
Approximately 194 miles of trails traverse the Lake Chelan-Sawtooth Wilderness. Trails tend to be steady climbs into high basins and glacial cirques with lakes. The south facing portion of the range has more open, rolling high country that falls off very steeply into the Lake Chelan valley. All trailheads on the south side of Lake Chelan must be gained via a regularly scheduled ferry boat or a private craft. Trails entering from the west first cross the North Cascades National Park or the Lake Chelan National Recreation Area.

== See also ==
- List of U.S. Wilderness Areas
- Wilderness Act
- Gardner Mountain, highest point of the wilderness
