= Silver Star Mountain (Okanogan County, Washington) =

Mountain in Washington, United States

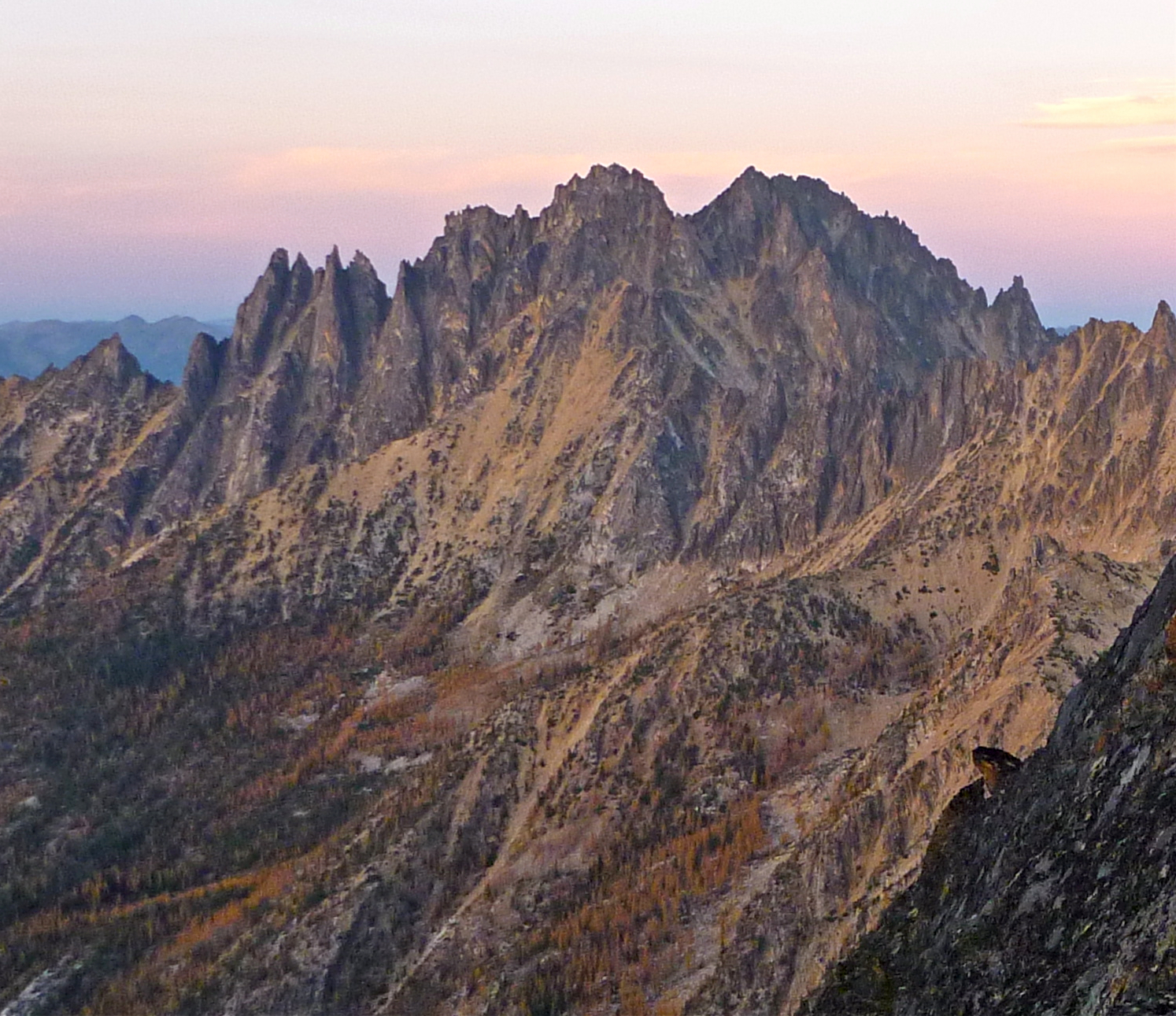
- Silver Star Mountain at sunset seen from Kangaroo Ridge

Highest point
- Elevation: 8,876 ft (2,705 m)
- Prominence: 2,436 ft (742 m)
- Coordinates: 48°32.88′N 120°35.11′W

Geography
- Location: Okanogan County, Washington
- Parent range: Methow Mountains; North Cascades; Cascade Range
- Topo map: USGS Silver Star Mountain

Geology
- Rock type: Granite

Climbing
- First ascent: Lage Wernstedt, 1926
- Easiest route: South Route

Silver Star Mountain is an 8,876-foot (2,705-metre) mountain located in Okanogan County, Washington. The mountain is part of the Methow Mountains, a subset of the Cascade Range. Silver Star is the dominant feature in the Washington Pass area and visible from the North Cascades Highway. It was first climbed by Lage Wernstedt in 1926.

The summit ridge of Silver Star consists of a long ridge of spires (the Wine Spires) leading to the main summit. Vasiliki Ridge radiates north from the Wine Spires, and Snagtooth Ridge extends south from Silver Star. The mountain is a steep ragged wall as seen from the west on Highway 20. The north side glacier reaches to just below the ridge line. The easiest route is up the moderate glacier from the north via Silver Star Creek.

Silver Star Mountain stands within the watershed of the Methow River, which drains into the Columbia River's Lake Pateros reservoir, impounded by Wells Dam. The west and north sides of Silver Star drain into Early Winters Creek, thence into the Methow River. The southeast side of Silver Star drains into Cedar Creek, thence into Early Winters Creek.

== Routes ==
=== East summit ===
- Silver Star Glacier class 3-4
- East ridge and spur class 5.8 Grade III
- Southeast Face and East ridge class 4-5 Grade II

=== West summit ===
- Southwest Buttress class 4
- West Buttress class 5.8 A1 Grade III
- Northeast Ridge class 5.9 Grade III
- Gato Negro class 5.10d
- Silver Star Glacier class 4

== Geology ==
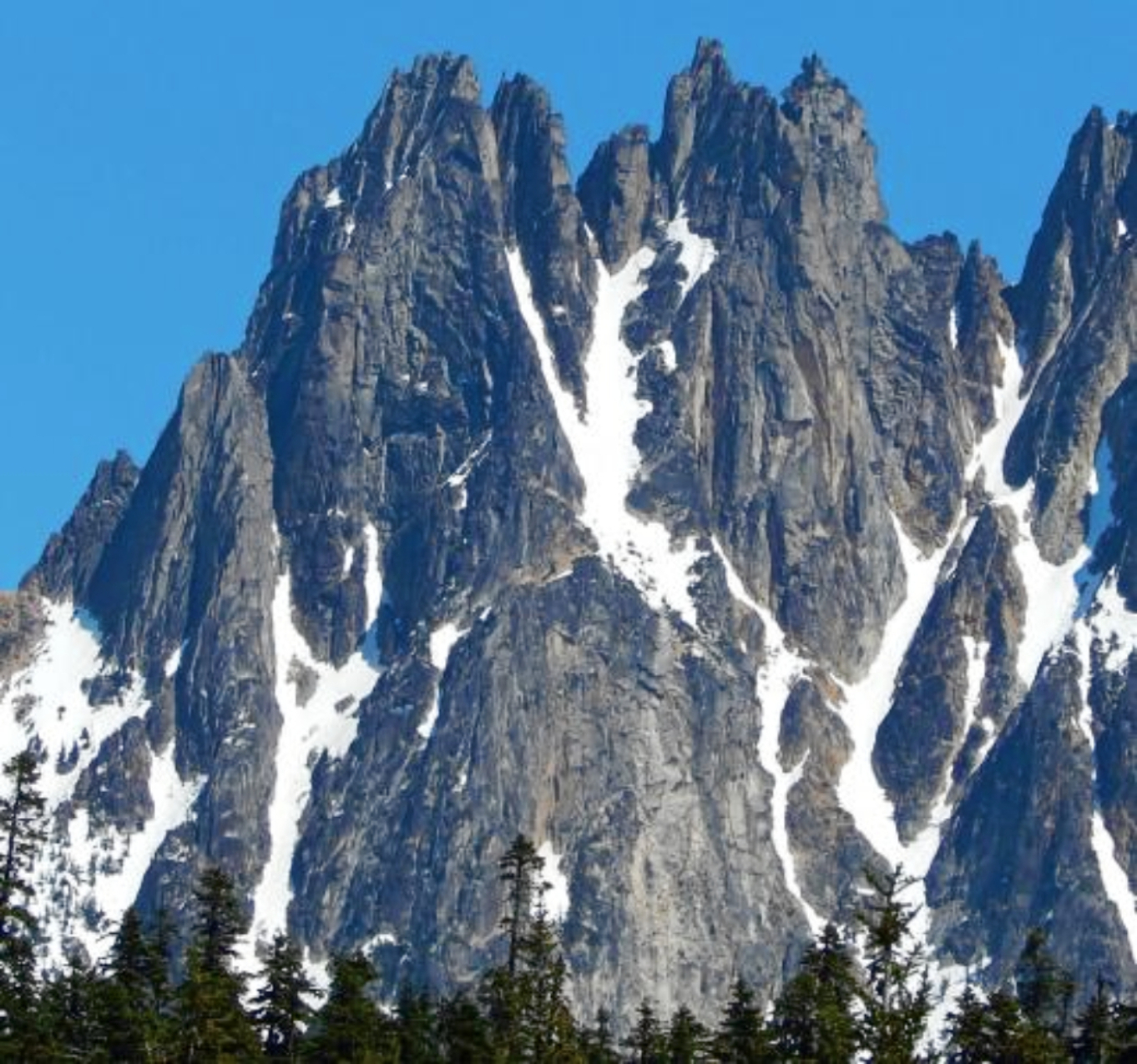
The Wine Spires of Silver Star Mountain

The North Cascades features some of the most rugged topography in the Cascade Range with craggy peaks, ridges, and deep glacial valleys. Geological events occurring many years ago created the diverse topography and drastic elevation changes over the Cascade Range leading to the various climate differences.

The history of the formation of the Cascade Mountains dates back millions of years ago to the late Eocene Epoch. With the North American Plate overriding the Pacific Plate, episodes of volcanic igneous activity persisted. In addition, small fragments of the oceanic and continental lithosphere called terranes created the North Cascades about 50 million years ago. Silver Star Mountain is located in the Golden Horn batholith and composed of granite like many of the peaks in the Washington Pass area.

During the Pleistocene period dating back over two million years ago, glaciation advancing and retreating repeatedly scoured the landscape leaving deposits of rock debris. The U-shaped cross section of the river valleys is a result of recent glaciation. Uplift and faulting in combination with glaciation have been the dominant processes which have created the tall peaks and deep valleys of the North Cascades area.

== Climate ==
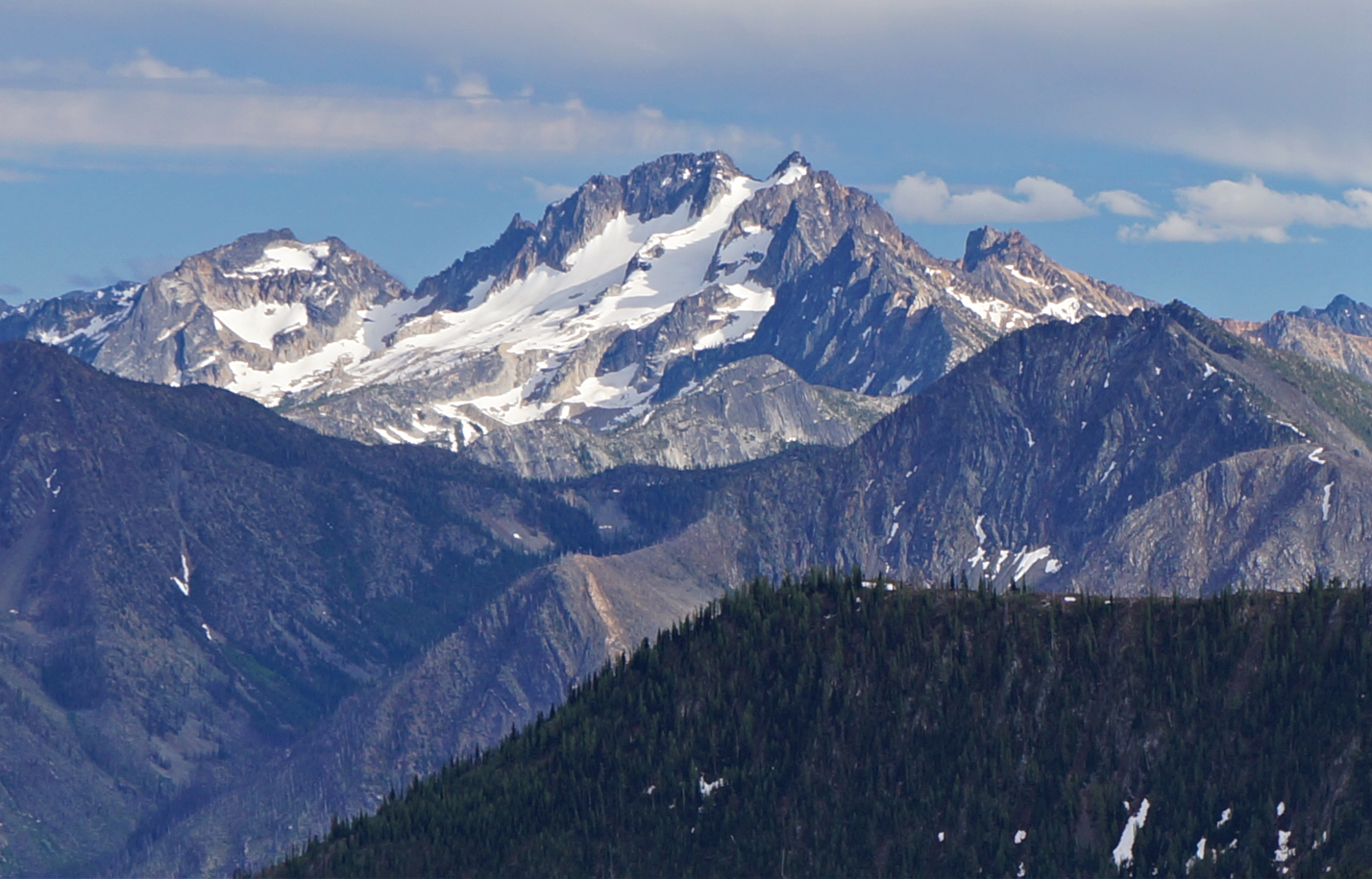
Silver Star and its glacier seen from Slate Peak. Silver Moon to the left.

Silver Star is located in the marine west coast climate zone of western North America. Most weather fronts originate in the Pacific Ocean, and travel northeast toward the Cascade Mountains. As fronts approach the North Cascades, they are forced upward by the peaks of the Cascade Range, causing them to drop their moisture in the form of rain or snowfall onto the Cascades (Orographic lift). As a result, the west side of the North Cascades experiences high precipitation, especially during the winter months in the form of snowfall. Snow accumulation sustains the Silver Star Glacier on the north slope of the mountain. During winter months, weather is usually cloudy, but, due to high pressure systems over the Pacific Ocean that intensify during summer months, there is often little or no cloud cover during the summer. Because of maritime influence, snow tends to be wet and heavy, resulting in high avalanche danger. The North Cascades Highway east of Washington Pass has the distinction of being among the top areas in the United States for most avalanche paths per mile of highway.
