= Big Kangaroo =

Mountain in Washington (state), United States

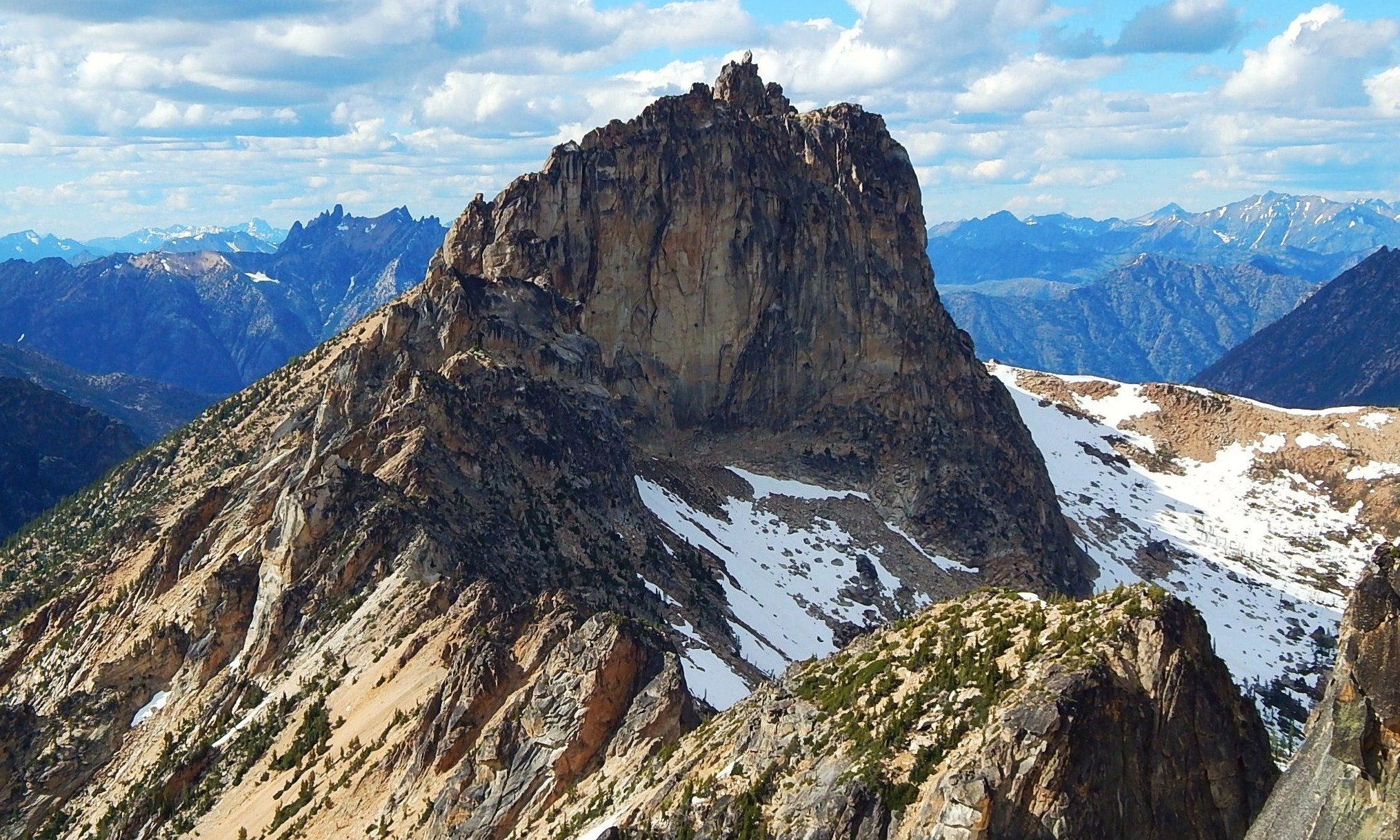
- Big Kangaroo seen from Wallaby Peak

Highest point
- Elevation: 8,326 ft (2,538 m)
- Prominence: 1,077 ft (328 m)
- Parent peak: Snagtooth Ridge
- Isolation: 1.68 mi (2.70 km)
- Coordinates: 48°31′09″N 120°37′03″W

Geography
- Location within Washington (state) Location within the United States
- Interactive map of Big Kangaroo
- Country: United States
- State: Washington
- County: Okanogan
- Protected area: Okanogan National Forest
- Parent range: Cascade Range; North Cascades; Methow Mountains
- Topo map: USGS Silver Star Mountain

Geology
- Rock age: 45 million years old
- Rock type: (Rapakivi texture) granite

Climbing
- First ascent: 1942 Fred Beckey

Big Kangaroo is an 8,326-foot (2,538-metre) mountain summit in Okanogan County, Washington, United States.

== Description ==
The granitic mountain is part of the Methow Mountains which are a subrange of the Cascade Range. Big Kangaroo is the high point of Kangaroo Ridge which rises about two miles east and within view of Washington Pass. The nearest higher neighbor is Snagtooth Ridge, 1.7 mi (2.7 km) to the northeast. Precipitation runoff from the peak drains into Early Winters Creek which is a tributary of the Methow River. Topographic relief is significant as the summit rises approximately 3,500 feet (1,067 meters) above Early Winters Creek in one mile (1.6 km). The first ascent of the summit was made by brothers Helmy and Fred Beckey, along with Walt Varney on June 21, 1942.

== Climate ==
Big Kangaroo is located in the marine west coast climate zone of western North America. Most weather fronts originating in the Pacific Ocean travel east toward the Cascade Mountains. As fronts approach the North Cascades, they are forced upward by the peaks of the Cascade Range, causing them to drop their moisture in the form of rain or snowfall onto the Cascades. As a result, the west side of the North Cascades experiences high precipitation, especially during the winter months in the form of snowfall. Because of maritime influence, snow tends to be wet and heavy, resulting in high avalanche danger. During winter months, weather is usually cloudy, but due to high pressure systems over the Pacific Ocean that intensify during summer months, there is often little or no cloud cover during the summer.

== Geology ==
The North Cascades features some of the most rugged topography in the Cascade Range with craggy peaks, ridges, and deep glacial valleys. Geological events occurring many years ago created the diverse topography and drastic elevation changes over the Cascade Range leading to the various climate differences. These climate differences lead to vegetation variety defining the ecoregions in this area.

The history of the formation of the Cascade Mountains dates back millions of years ago to the late Eocene Epoch. With the North American Plate overriding the Pacific Plate, episodes of volcanic igneous activity persisted. In addition, small fragments of the oceanic and continental lithosphere called terranes created the North Cascades about 50 million years ago.

During the Pleistocene period dating back over two million years ago, glaciation advancing and retreating repeatedly scoured the landscape leaving deposits of rock debris. The U-shaped cross section of the river valleys is a result of recent glaciation. Uplift and faulting in combination with glaciation have been the dominant processes which have created the tall peaks and deep valleys of the North Cascades area.

== Gallery ==
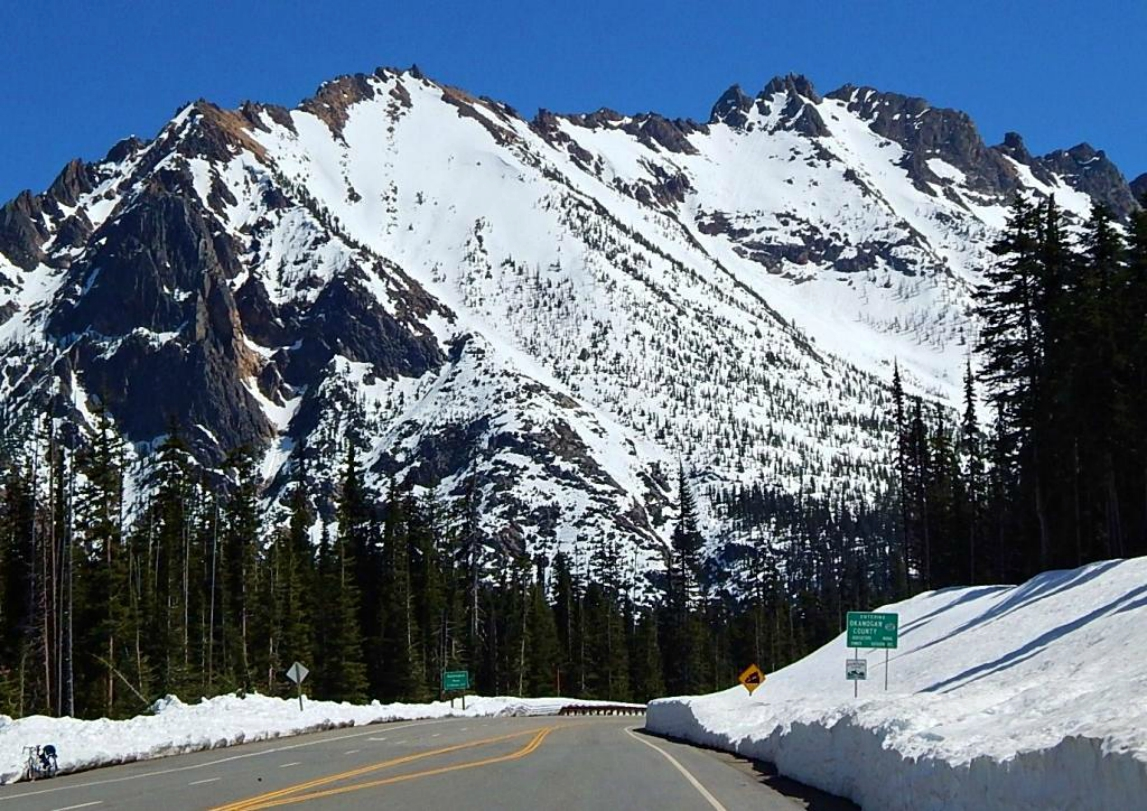
Washington Pass view of Kangaroo Ridge

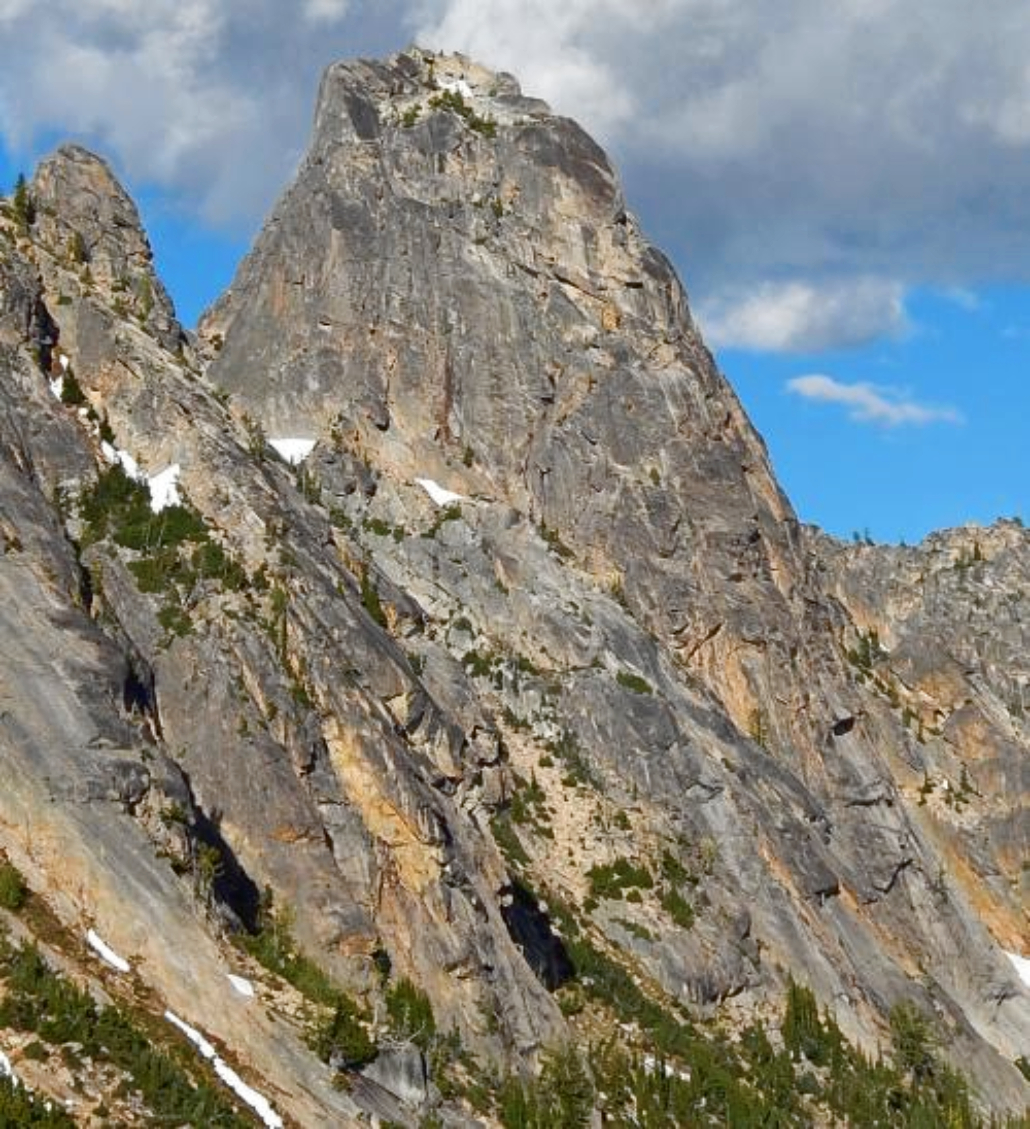
Kangaroo Temple

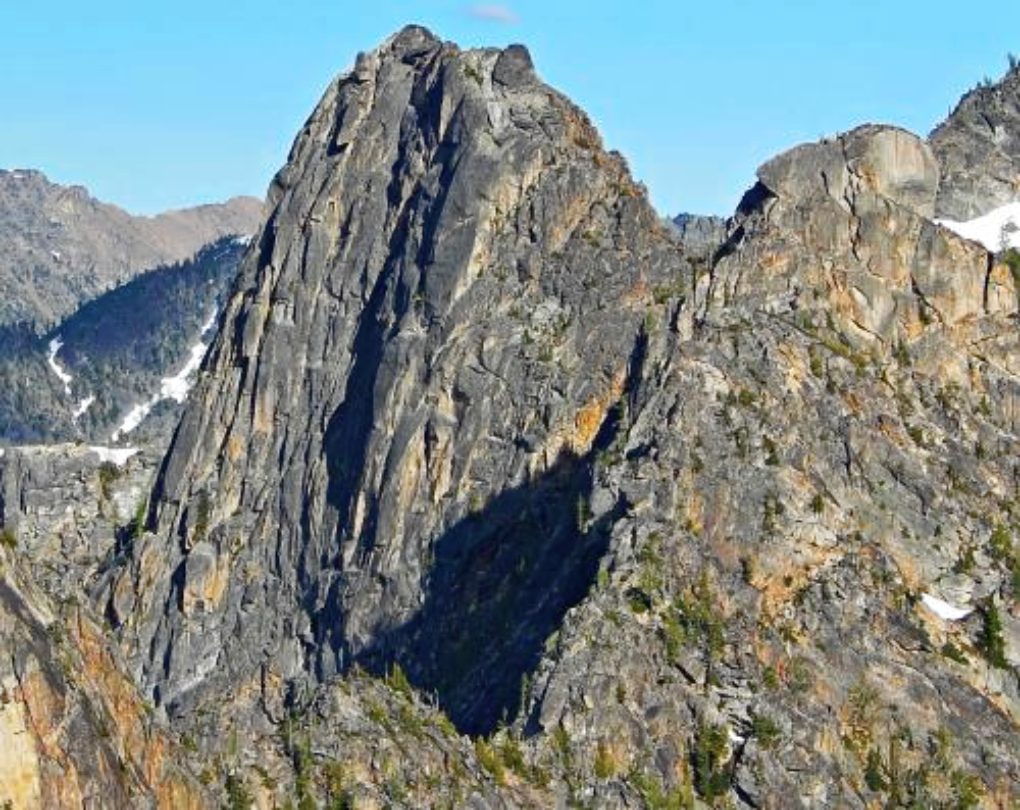
The Fin and The Tomahawk

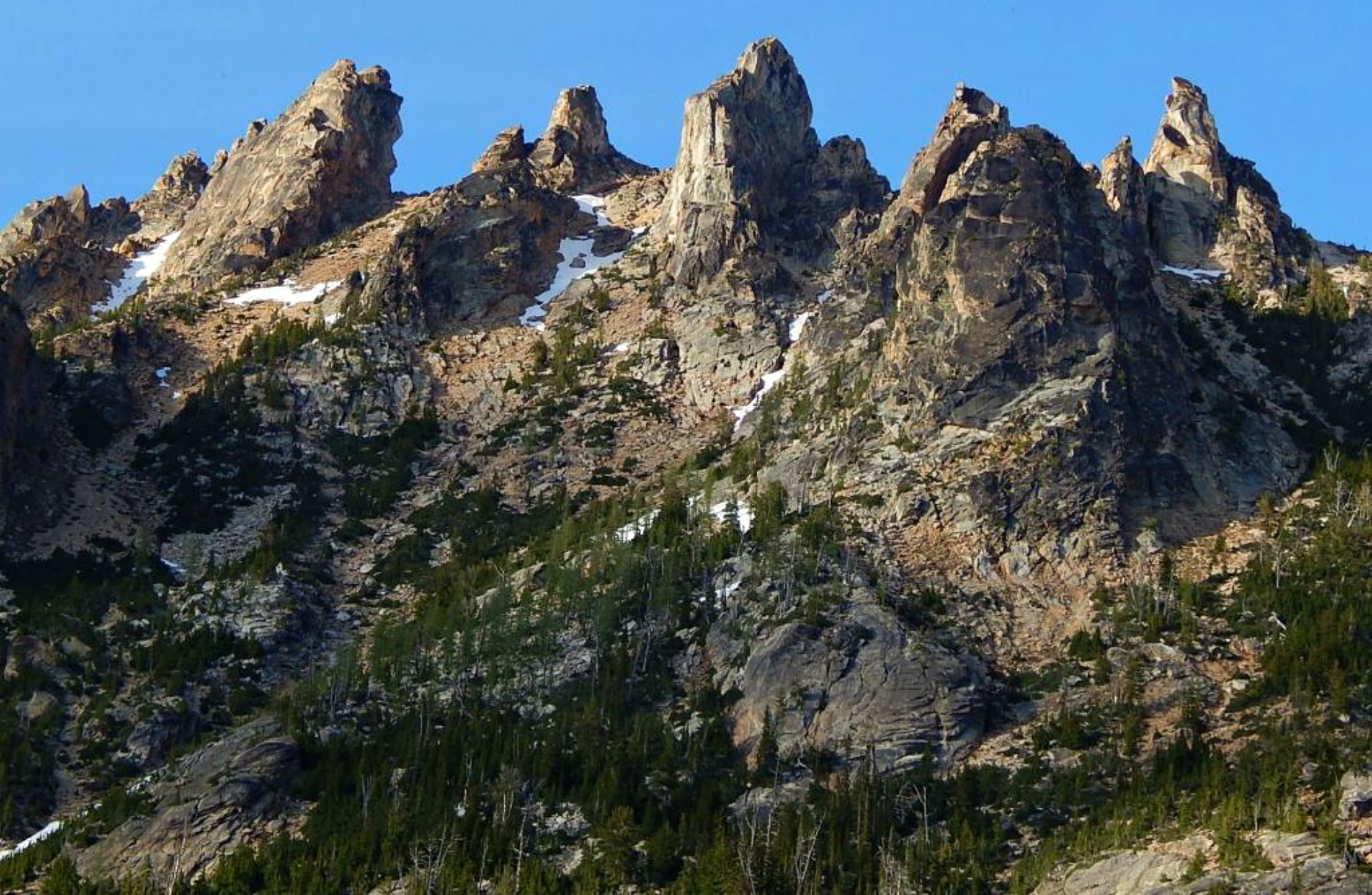
Melted Tower

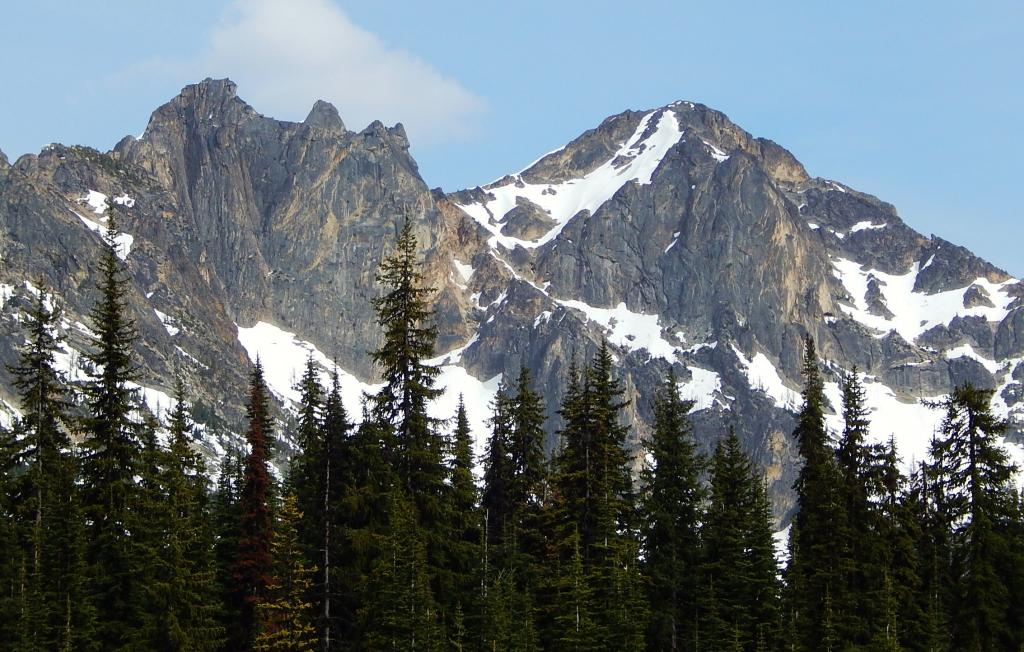
Half Moon and Wallaby Peak

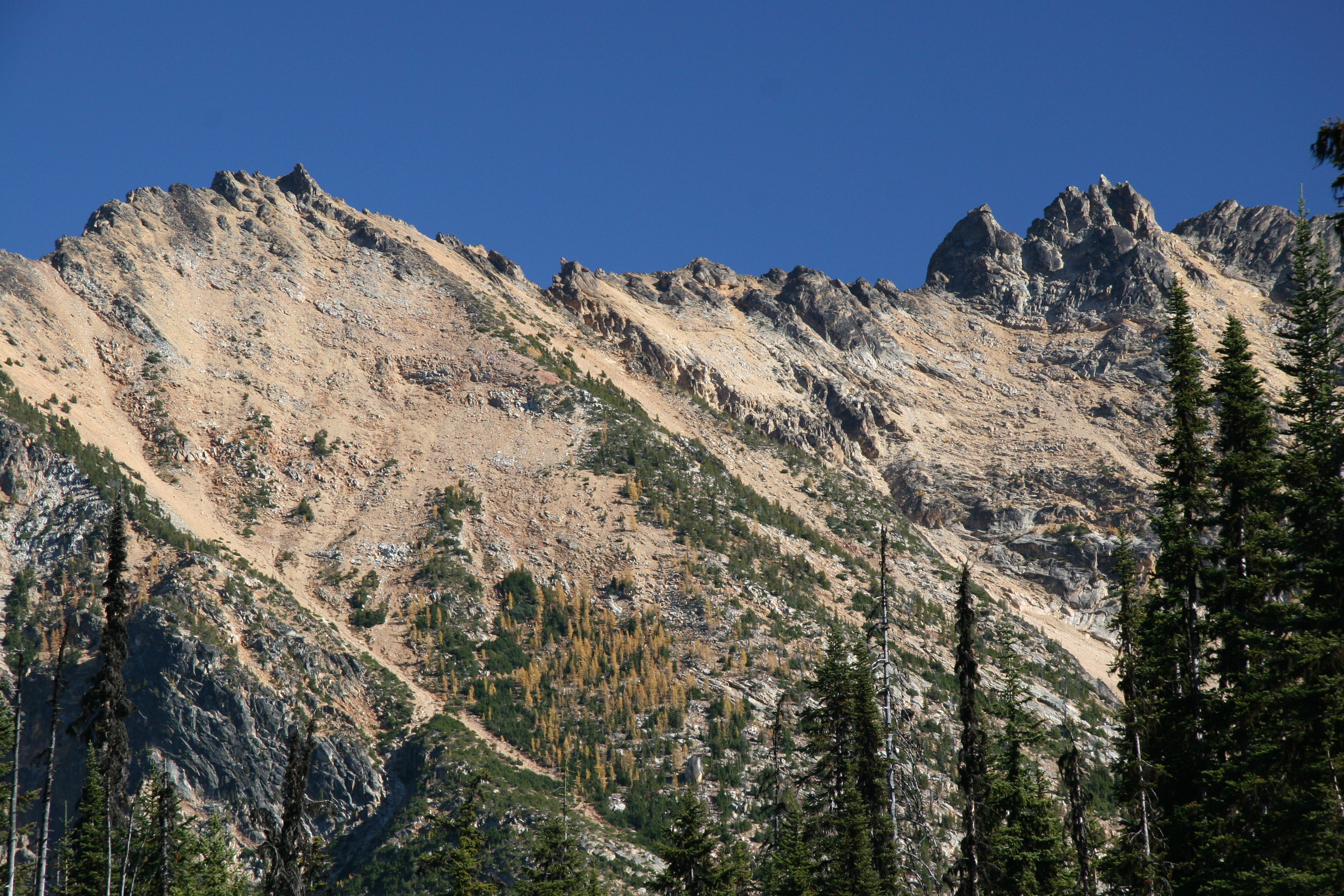
Joey (left) and Big Kangaroo

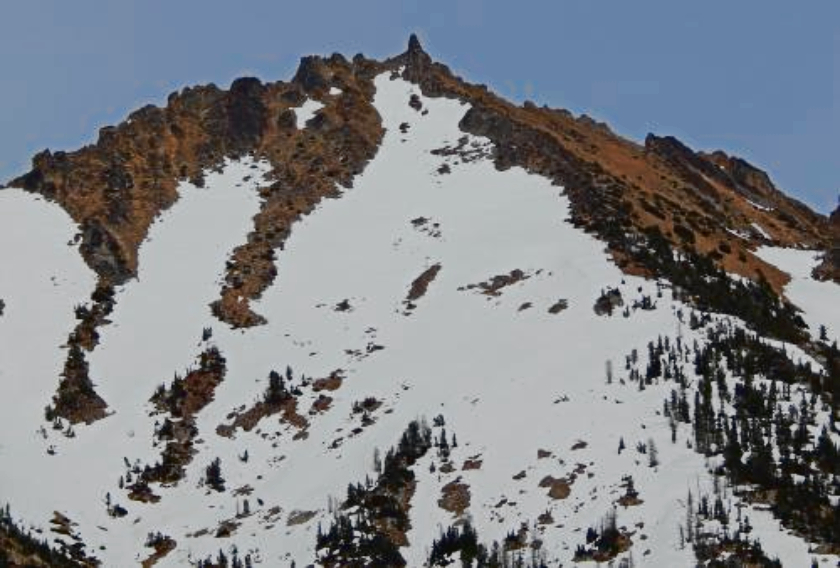
"Joey" 8,183'

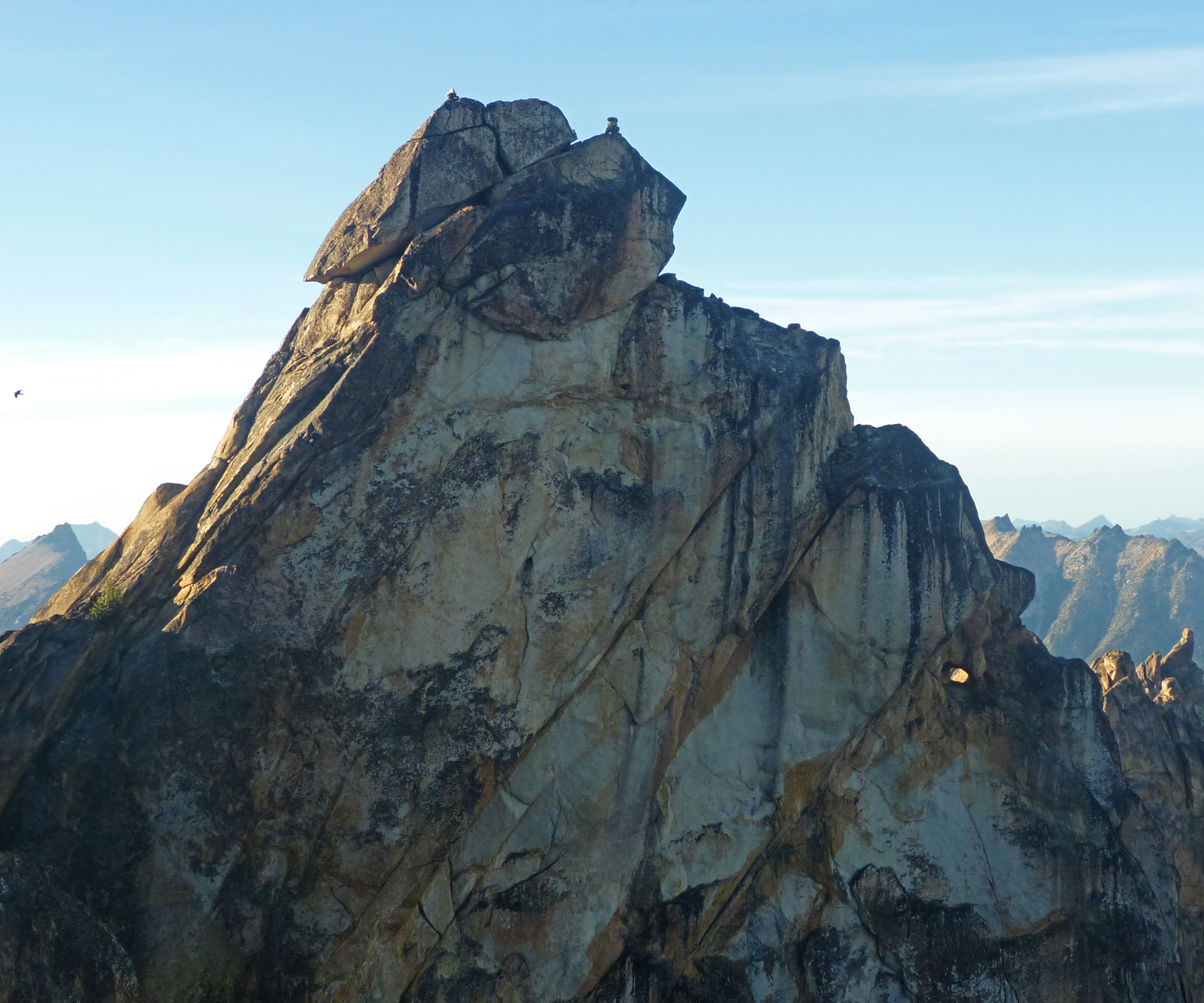
Summit of Big Kangaroo

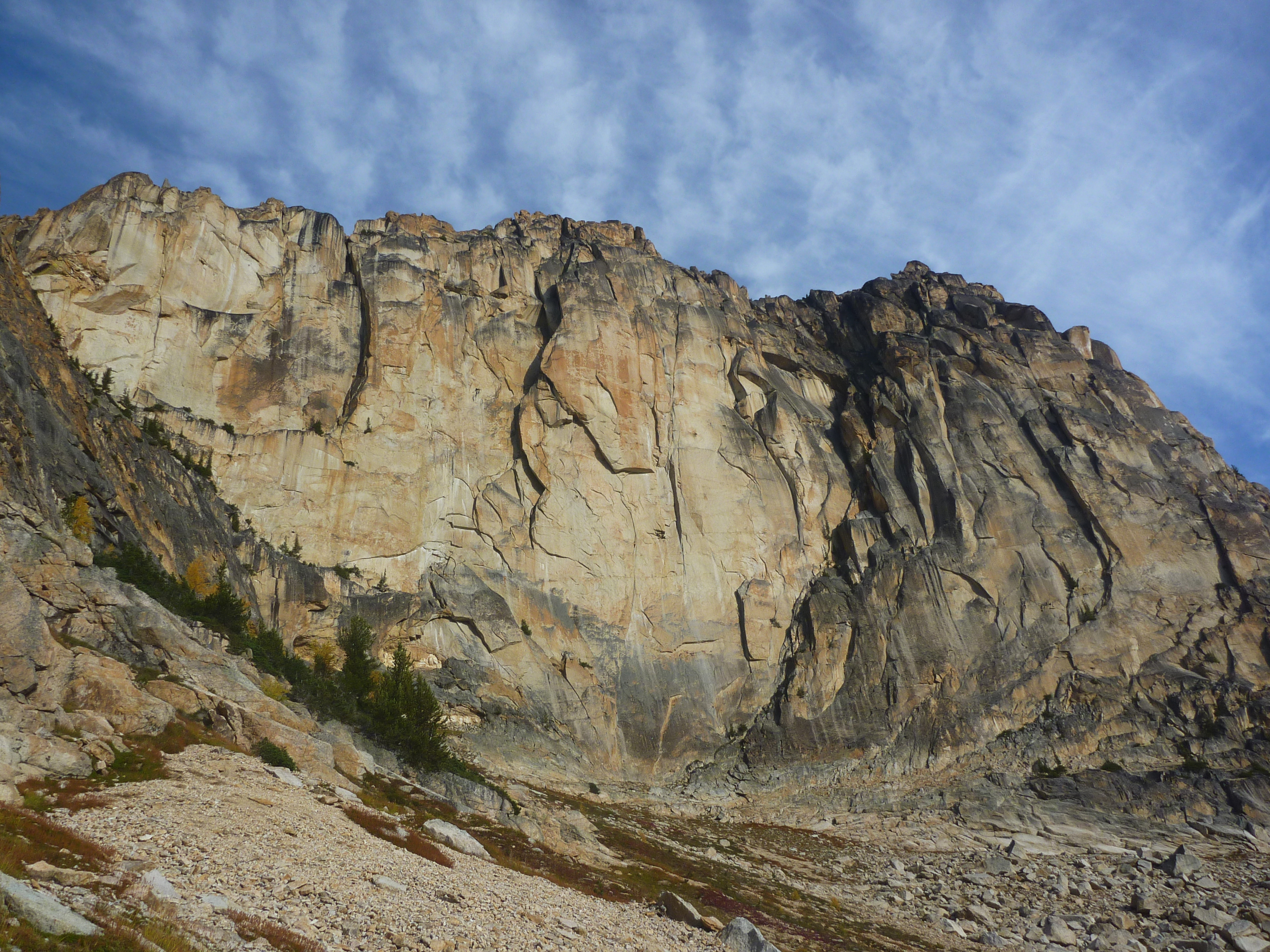
Big Kangaroo's south face

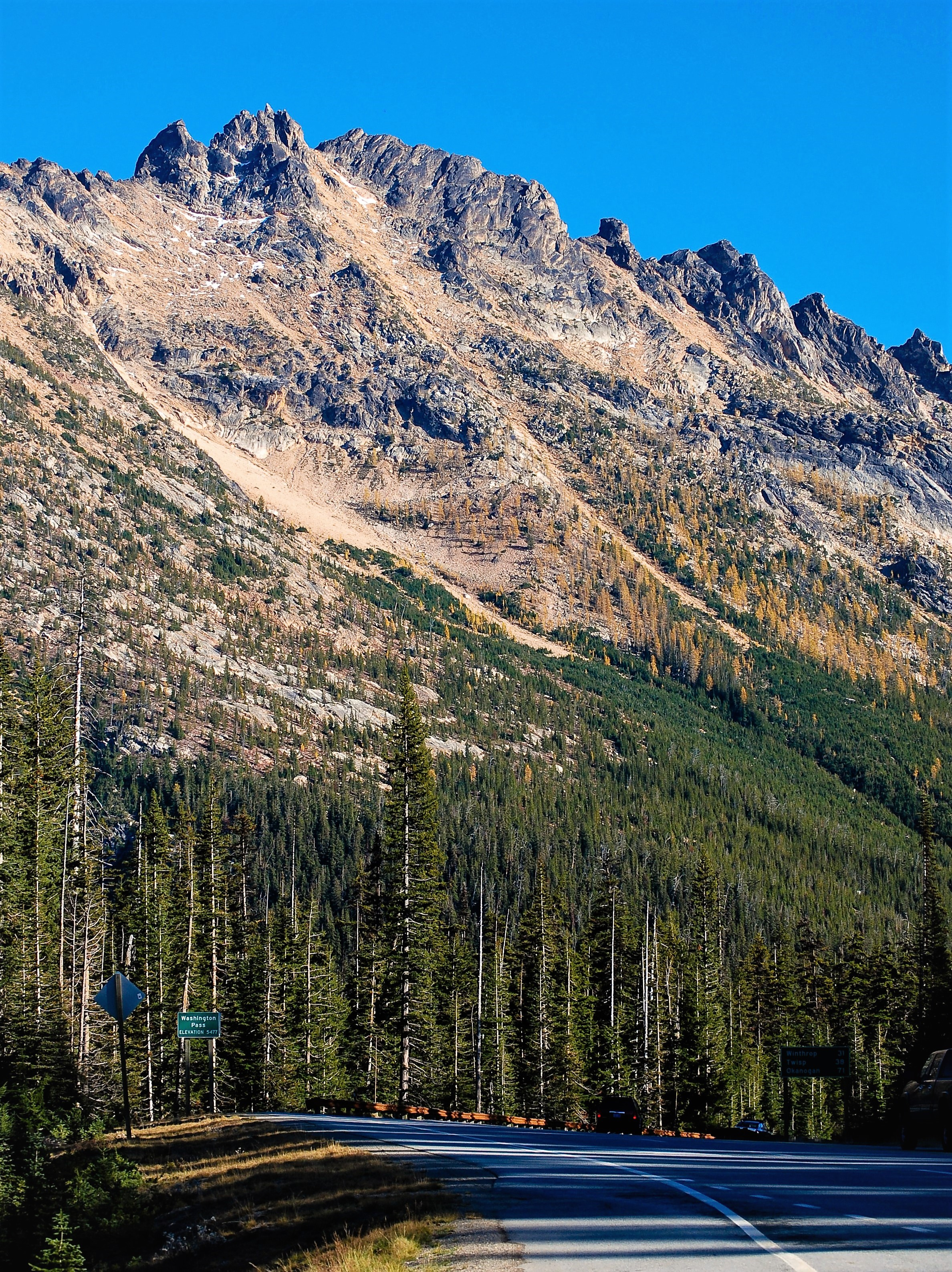
Big Kangaroo viewed from Washington Pass

== See also ==
- Geography of the North Cascades
- Geology of the Pacific Northwest
- List of mountain peaks of Washington (state)
