= Snagtooth Ridge =

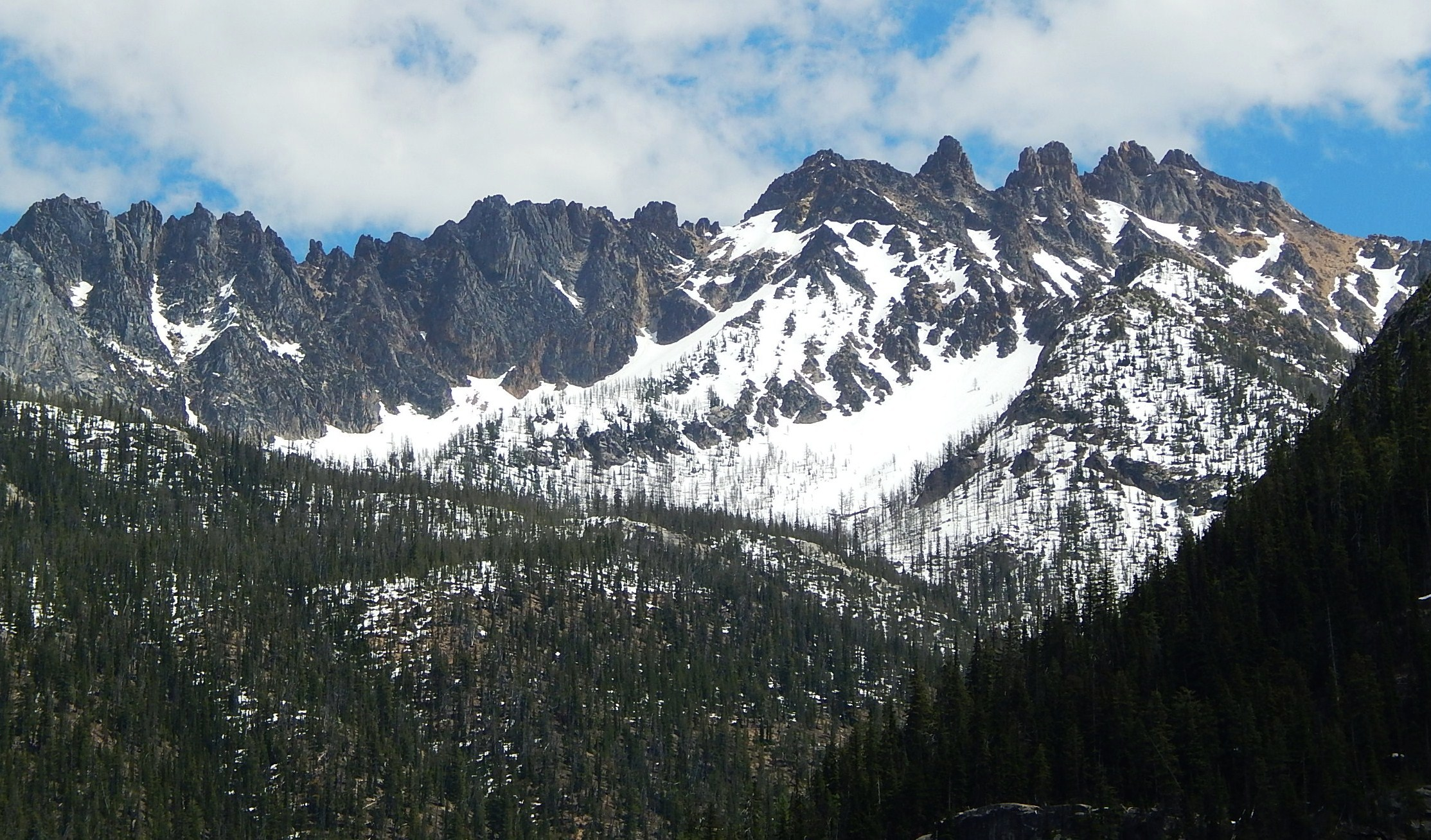
- Snagtooth Ridge from North Cascades Highway

Highest point
- Elevation: 8,374 ft (2,552 m)
- Prominence: 570 ft (170 m)
- Coordinates: 48°32′05″N 120°35′22″W

Geography
- Location within Washington (state) Location within the United States
- Interactive map of Snagtooth Ridge
- Country: United States
- State: Washington
- County: Okanogan
- Protected area: Okanogan National Forest
- Parent range: Cascade Range; North Cascades; Methow Mountains
- Topo map: USGS Silver Star Mountain

Climbing
- First ascent: 1946 Fred Beckey
- Easiest route: Scrambling

Snagtooth Ridge is a jagged granitic ridge located in Okanogan County of Washington state. It is part of the Methow Mountains which are a subrange of the North Cascades. Snagtooth Ridge is situated between Silver Star Mountain and Kangaroo Ridge on land administered by the Okanogan–Wenatchee National Forest. Precipitation runoff from the ridge drains into tributaries of the Methow River. Topographic relief is significant as the summit rises approximately 3,000 feet (914 meters) above West Fork Cedar Creek in one mile (1.6 km).

Big Snagtooth, at 8,374-feet elevation, is the highest point on Snagtooth Ridge. Other named spires include Willow Tooth, Cedar Tooth, Decayed Tooth, Red Tooth, Dog Tooth, Grey Tooth, Split Tooth, Cleft Tooth, Silver Tooth, and Last Tooth. The first ascent of Big Snagtooth was made September 29, 1946, by Fred Beckey, Jerry O'Neil, and Charles Welsh.

== Climate ==
Weather fronts originating in the Pacific Ocean travel northeast toward the Cascade Mountains. As fronts approach the North Cascades, they are forced upward by the peaks of the Cascade Range (orographic lift), causing them to drop their moisture in the form of rain or snowfall onto the Cascades. As a result, the west side of the North Cascades experiences high precipitation, especially during the winter months in the form of snowfall. Because of maritime influence, snow tends to be wet and heavy, resulting in high avalanche danger. During winter months, weather is usually cloudy, but, due to high pressure systems over the Pacific Ocean that intensify during summer months, there is often little or no cloud cover during the summer.

== Geology ==
The North Cascades features some of the most rugged topography in the Cascade Range with craggy peaks, ridges, and deep glacial valleys. Geological events occurring many years ago created the diverse topography and drastic elevation changes over the Cascade Range leading to the various climate differences. These climate differences lead to vegetation variety defining the ecoregions in this area.

The history of the formation of the Cascade Mountains dates back millions of years ago to the late Eocene Epoch. With the North American Plate overriding the Pacific Plate, episodes of volcanic igneous activity persisted. In addition, small fragments of the oceanic and continental lithosphere called terranes created the North Cascades about 50 million years ago.

During the Pleistocene period dating back over two million years ago, glaciation advancing and retreating repeatedly scoured the landscape leaving deposits of rock debris. The U-shaped cross section of the river valleys is a result of recent glaciation. Uplift and faulting in combination with glaciation have been the dominant processes which have created the tall peaks and deep valleys of the North Cascades area.

== Gallery ==
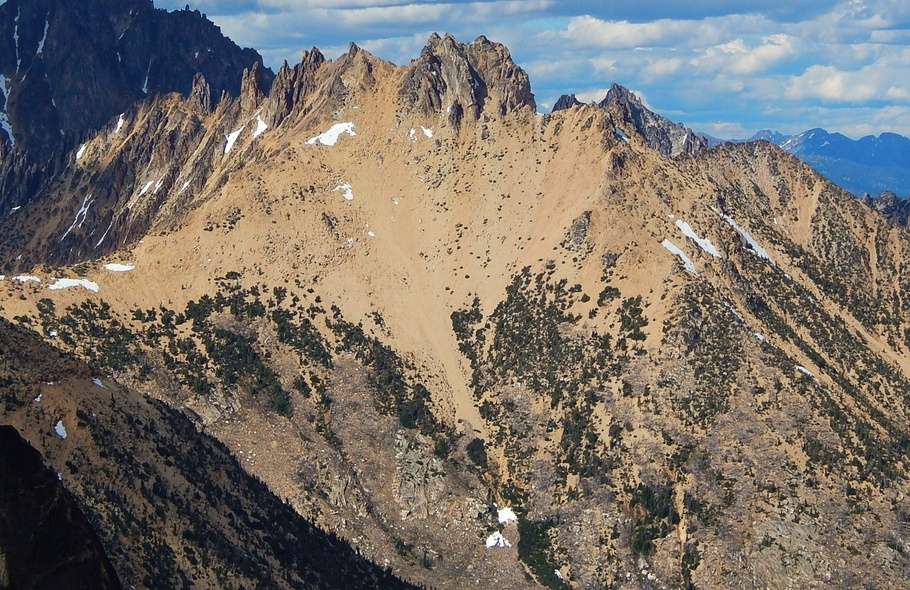
Snagtooth Ridge seen from Kangaroo Ridge

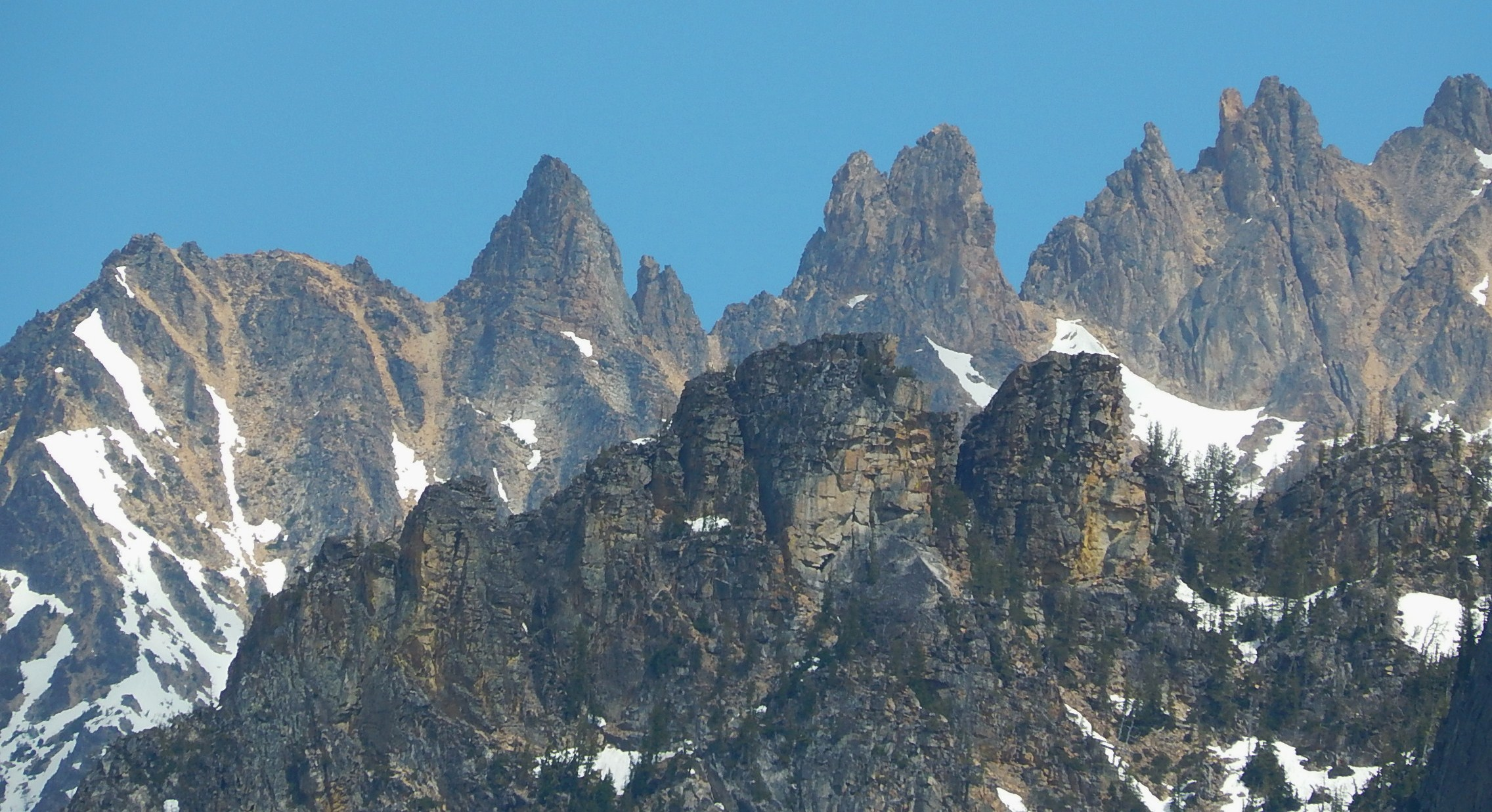
Snagtooth Ridge with Dog Tooth, Red Tooth, Cedar Tooth

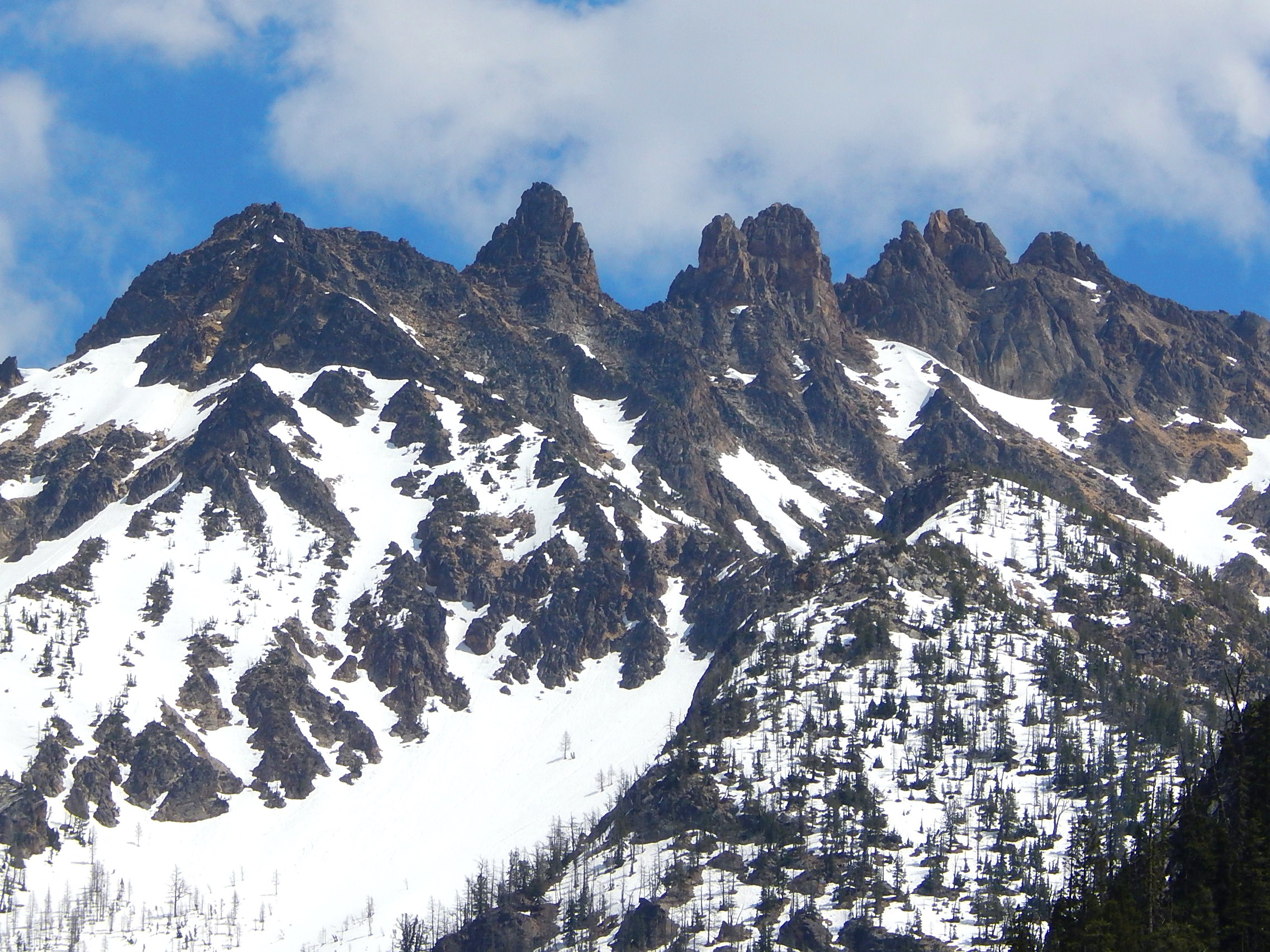
Snagtooth Ridge

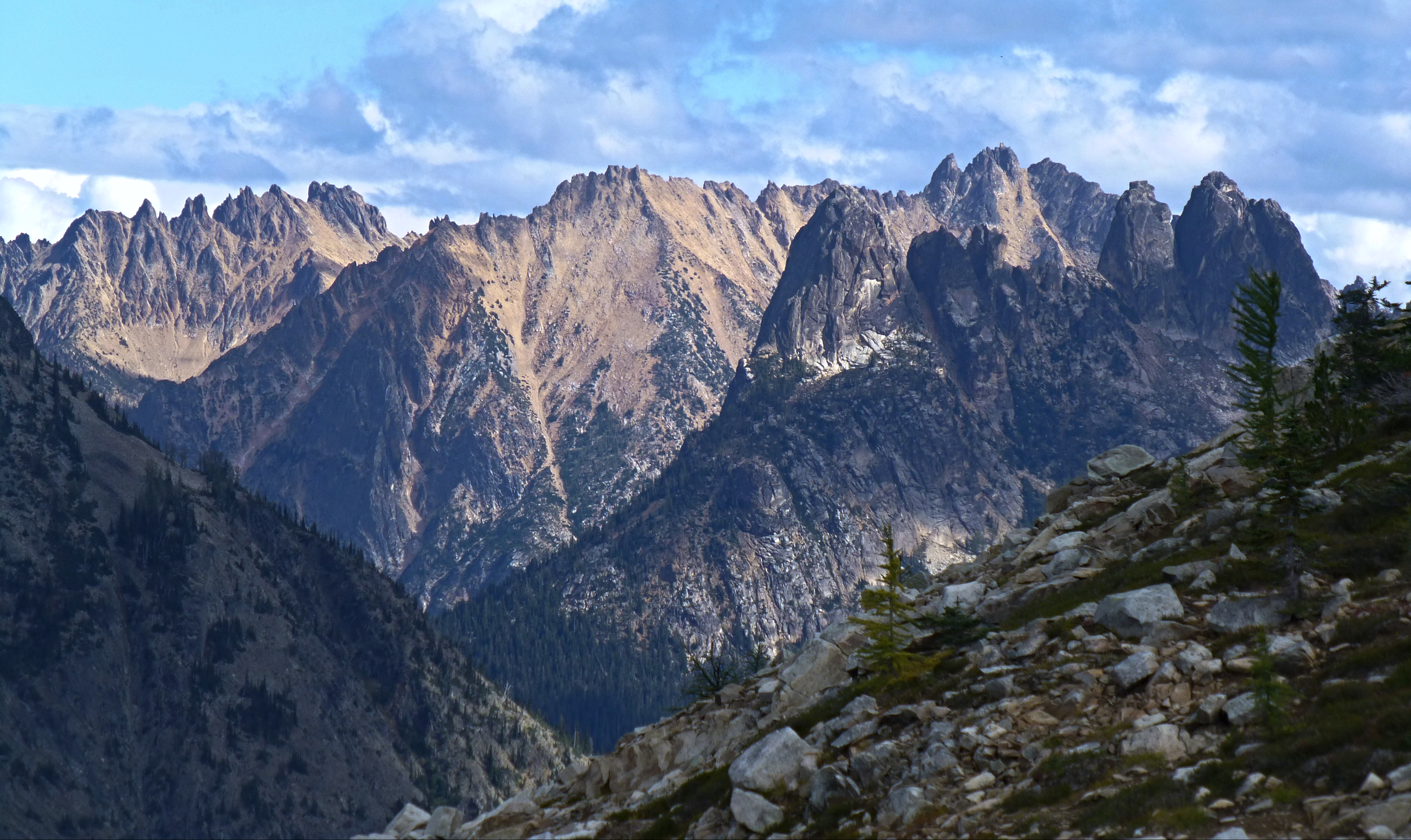
Snagtooth Ridge (left) from Maple Pass trail

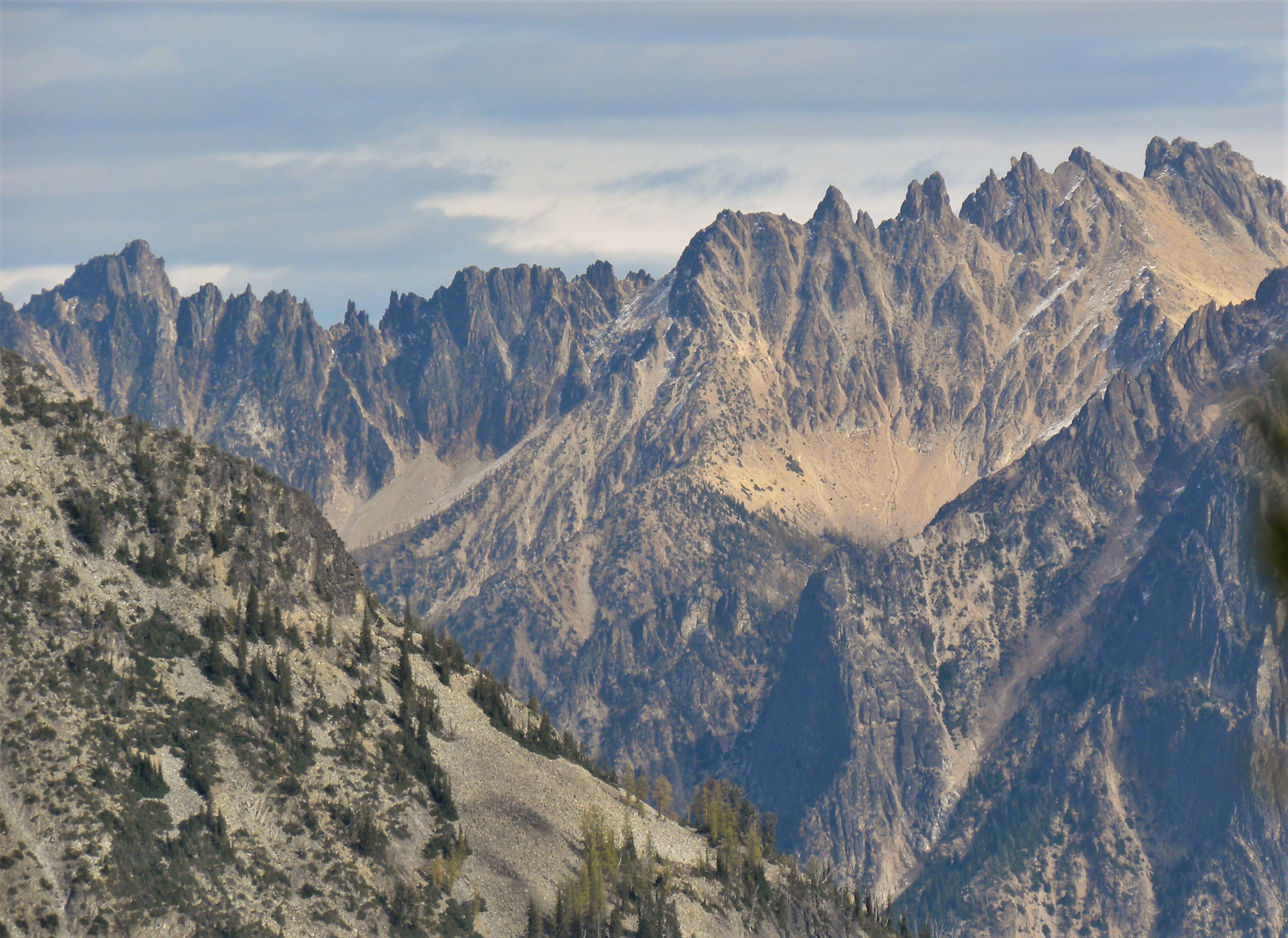
Snagtooth Ridge from Maple Pass trail

== See also ==
- Geography of the North Cascades
