= Vasiliki Ridge =

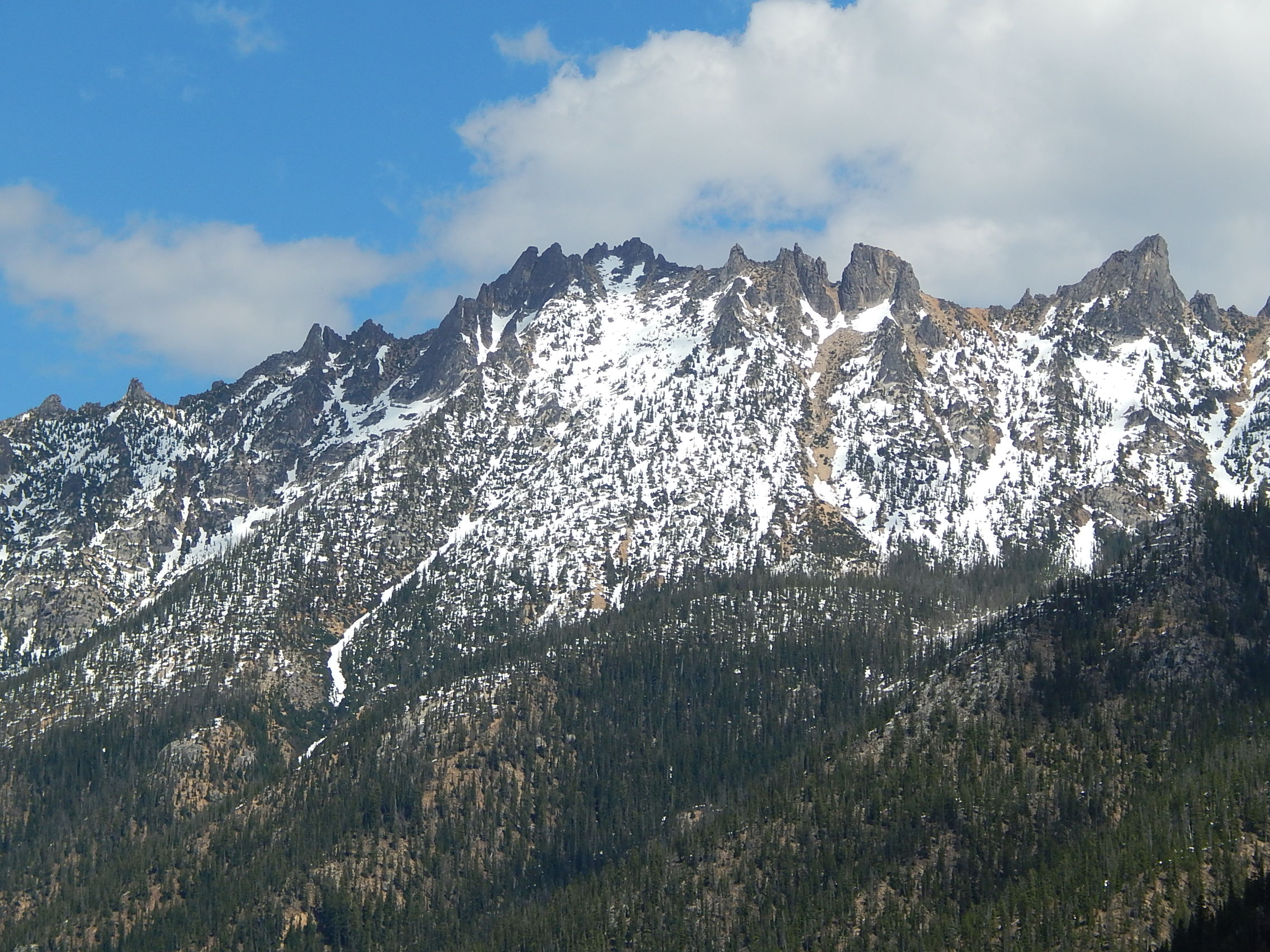
- Vasiliki seen from North Cascades Highway near Washington Pass

Highest point
- Elevation: 8,190 ft (2,496 m)
- Prominence: 390 ft (119 m)
- Coordinates: 48°33′38″N 120°35′45″W

Geography
- Location within Washington (state) Location within the United States
- Interactive map of Vasiliki Ridge
- Country: United States
- State: Washington
- County: Okanogan
- Parent range: North Cascades
- Topo map: USGS Silver Star Mountain

Geology
- Rock type: Granite

Climbing
- First ascent: May 31, 1952 Fred Beckey, Herb Staley
- Easiest route: Climbing

Vasiliki Ridge is a three-mile-long ridge located in Okanogan County of Washington state. It is part of the Methow Mountains which are a sub-range of the North Cascades. Vasiliki Ridge is situated north of Silver Star Mountain on land administered by the Okanogan–Wenatchee National Forest. Vasiliki Ridge can be seen from Washington Pass and from the North Cascades Highway.

Vasiliki Ridge summit, at 8,190-feet elevation, is the highest point on Vasiliki Ridge. Named granite spires include Charon Tower, The Acropolis, Ares Tower, Vasiliki Tower, Juno-Jupiter Towers, Aphrodite Tower, and Baccus Tower. Precipitation runoff from the ridge drains into Early Winters Creek which is a tributary of the Methow River.

== Etymology ==
The name Vasiliki was recommended by climber Fred Beckey who made the first ascent in 1952. He named the ridge for his friend, Vasiliki Dwyer, a woman he met at Stevens Pass Ski Area in 1952, then had a brief romance. Beckey named many peaks in his life, but this was the only one he named after a woman. The toponym was officially adopted in 1978 by the United States Board on Geographic Names.

== Climate ==
Weather fronts originating in the Pacific Ocean travel northeast toward the Cascade Mountains. As fronts approach the North Cascades, they are forced upward by the peaks of the Cascade Range, causing them to drop their moisture in the form of rain or snow onto the Cascades (Orographic lift). As a result, the west side of the North Cascades experiences high precipitation, especially during the winter months in the form of snowfall. Because of maritime influence, snow tends to be wet and heavy, resulting in high avalanche danger. This climate supports the adjacent Silver Star Glacier and the North Cascades Highway east of Washington Pass below Vasiliki Ridge has the distinction of being among the top areas in the United States for most avalanche paths per mile of highway. During winter months, weather is usually cloudy, but due to high pressure systems over the Pacific Ocean that intensify during summer months, there is often little or no cloud cover during the summer.

== Geology ==
The North Cascades features some of the most rugged topography in the Cascade Range with craggy peaks, ridges, and deep glacial valleys. Geological events occurring many years ago created the diverse topography and drastic elevation changes over the Cascade Range leading to various climate differences. These climate differences lead to vegetation variety defining the ecoregions in this area.

The history of the formation of the Cascade Mountains dates back millions of years ago to the late Eocene Epoch. With the North American Plate overriding the Pacific Plate, episodes of volcanic igneous activity persisted. In addition, small fragments of the oceanic and continental lithosphere called terranes created the North Cascades about 50 million years ago. Vasiliki Ridge is carved mostly from granite of the Golden Horn batholith.

During the Pleistocene period dating back over two million years ago, glaciation advancing and retreating repeatedly scoured the landscape leaving deposits of rock debris. The U-shaped cross section of the river valleys is a result of recent glaciation. Uplift and faulting in combination with glaciation have been the dominant processes which have created the tall peaks and deep valleys of the North Cascades area.

== Gallery ==
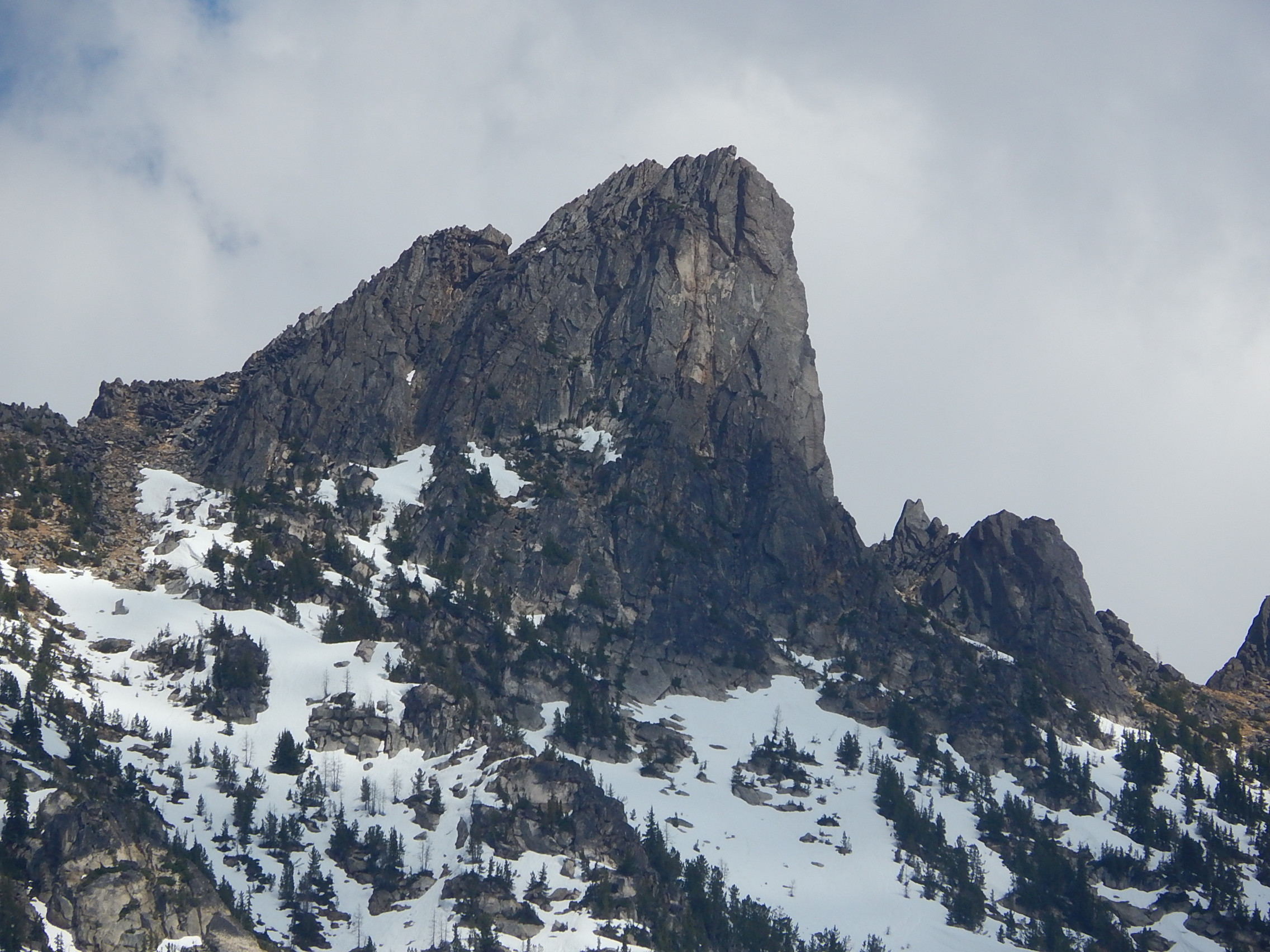
Vasiliki Tower

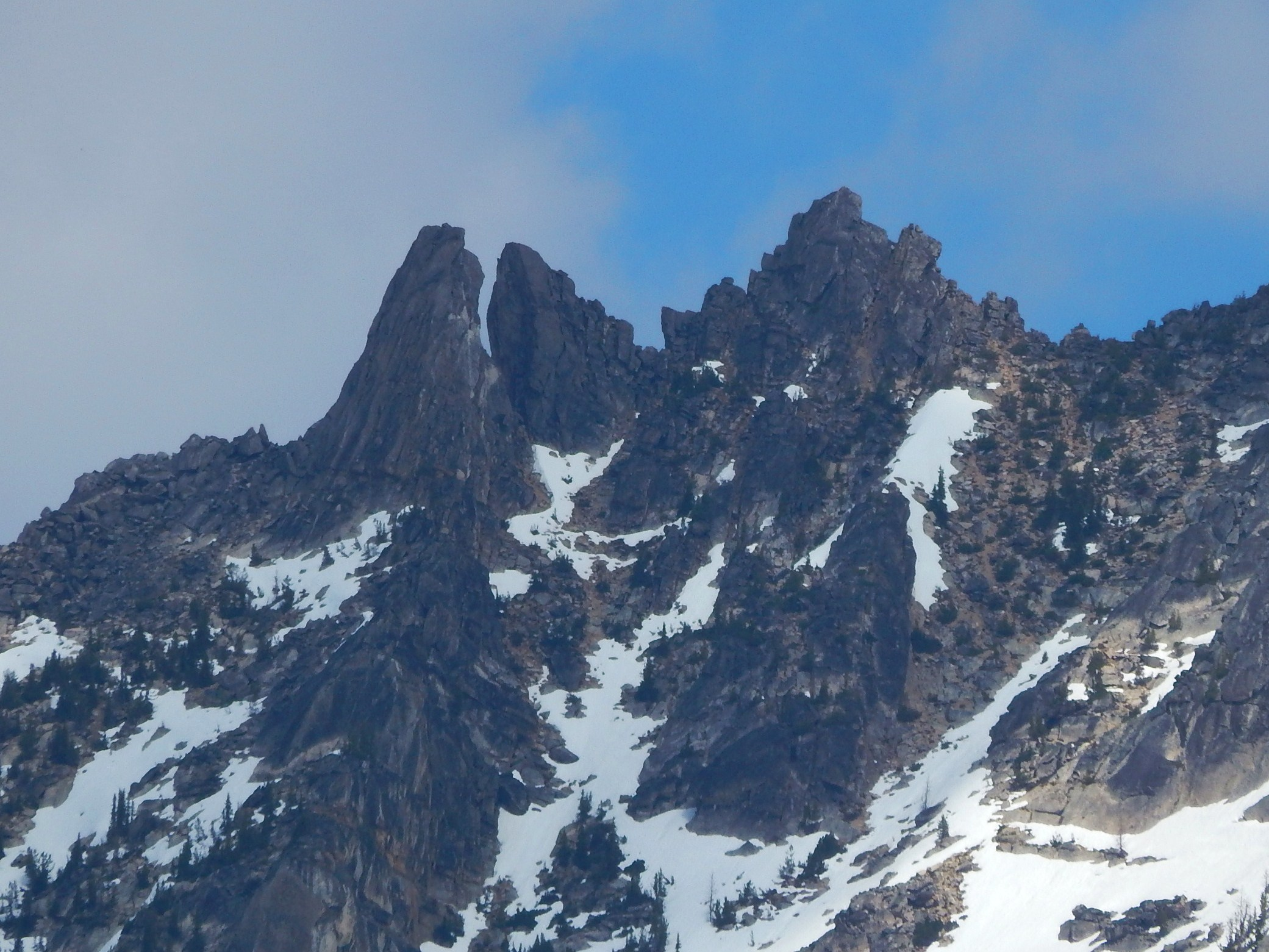
Juno-Jupiter Tower

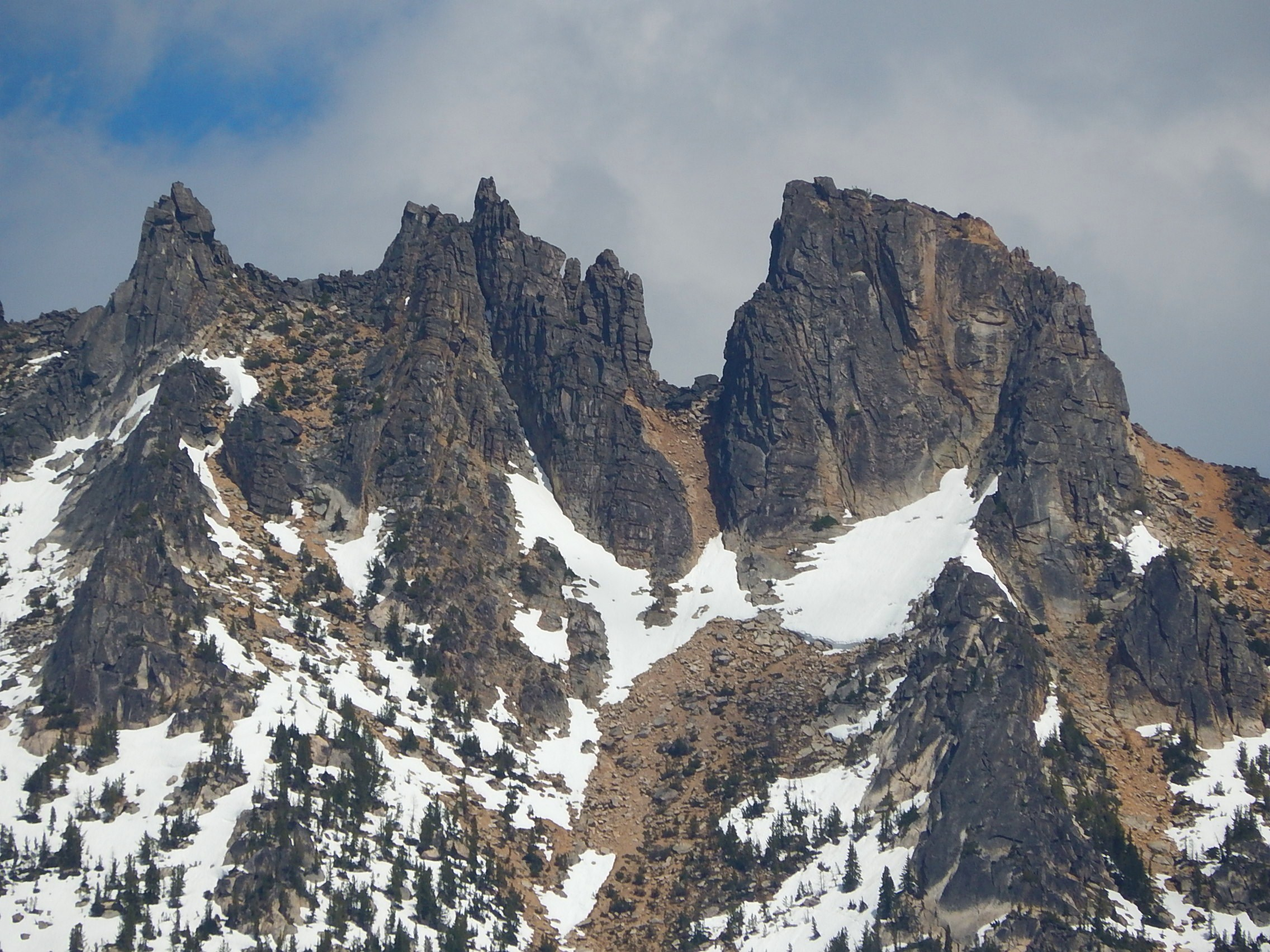
The Acropolis, Charon Tower

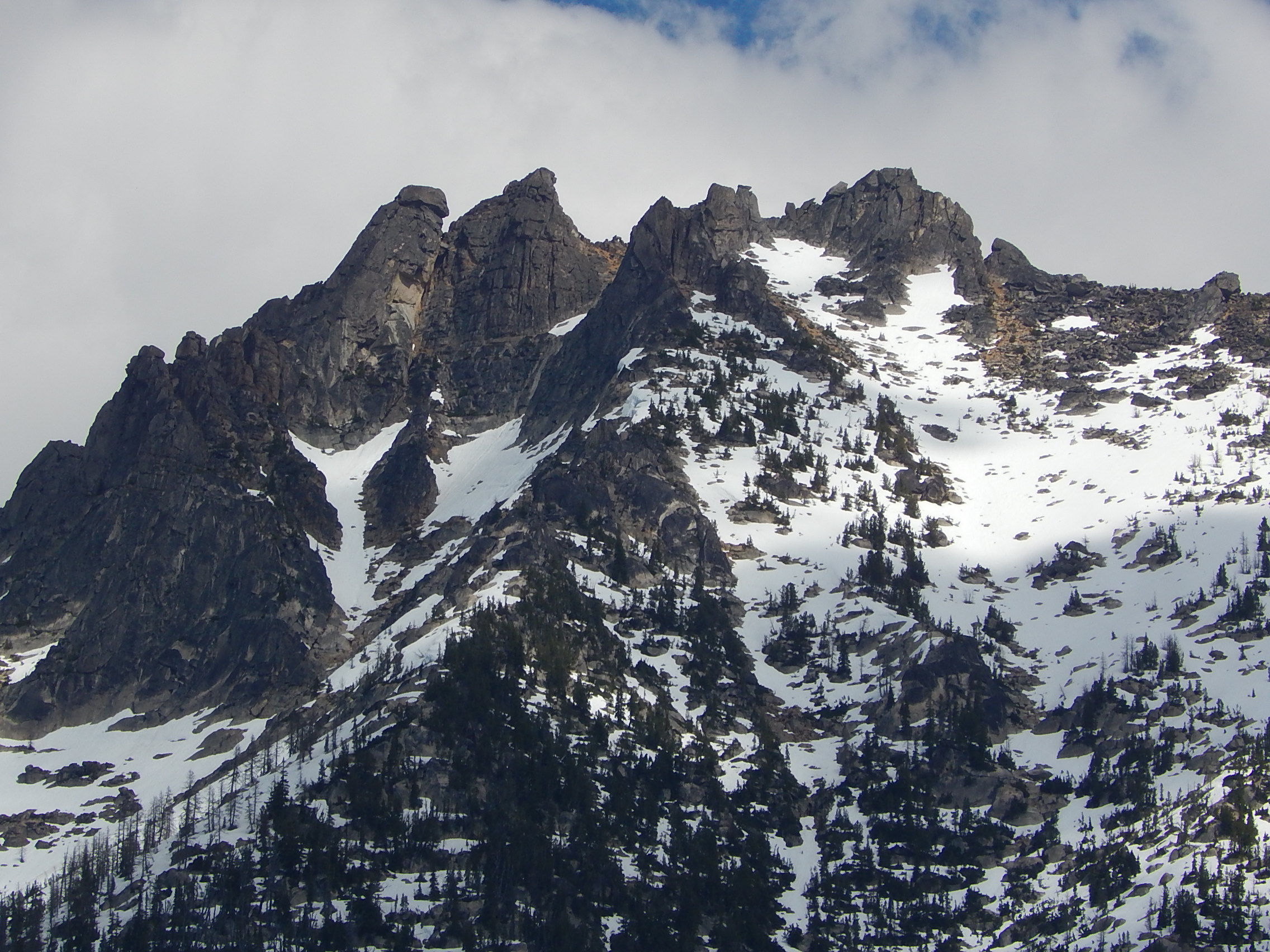
Summit, Ares Tower

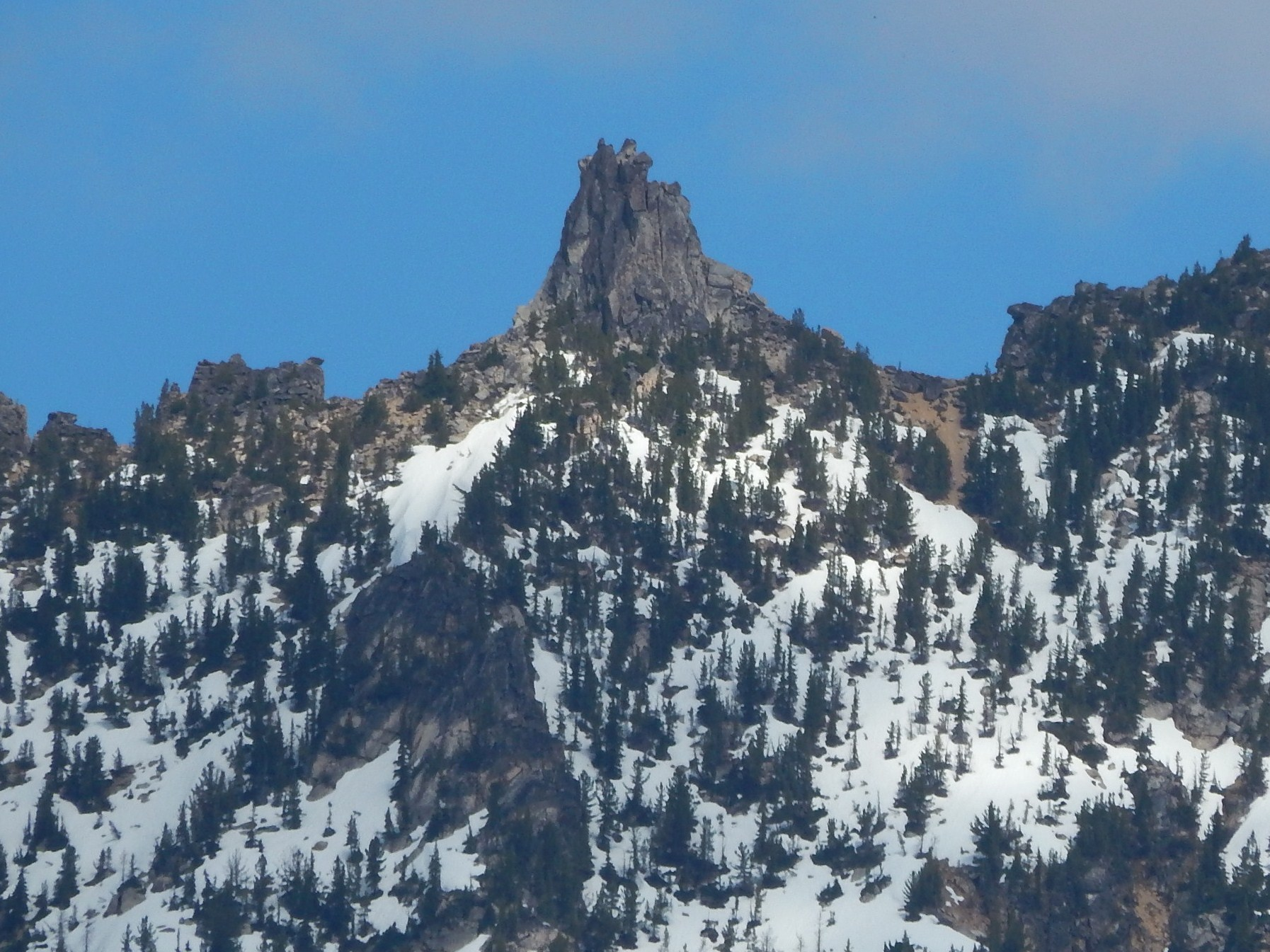
Aphrodite Tower

== See also ==
- Geography of the North Cascades
- Geology of the Pacific Northwest
