= Wallaby Peak =

Mountain in Washington (state), United States

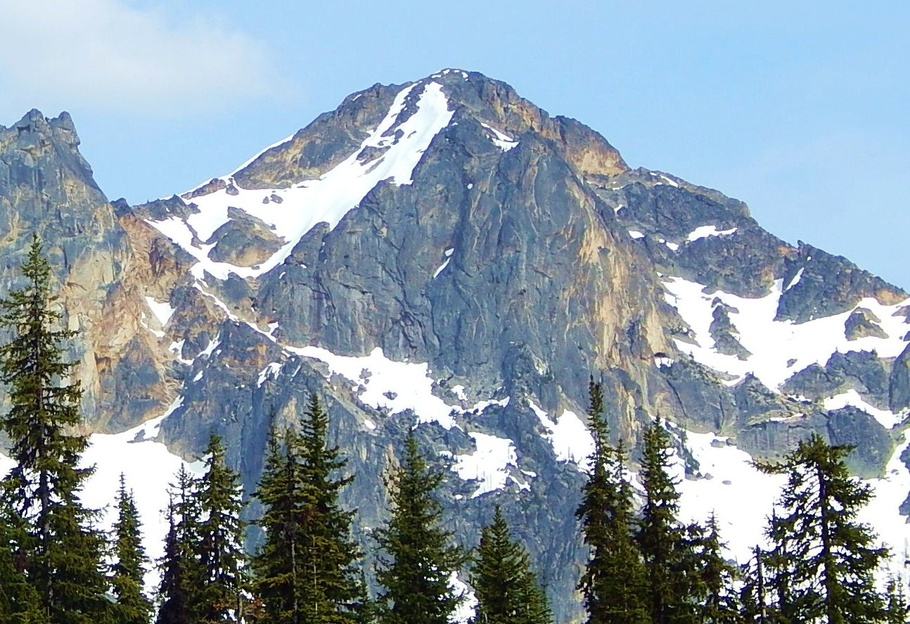
- Wallaby Peak, west aspect

Highest point
- Elevation: 7,995 ft (2,437 m)
- Prominence: 475 ft (145 m)
- Coordinates: 48°30′24″N 120°36′55″W

Geography
- Location within Washington (state) Location within the United States
- Interactive map of Wallaby Peak
- Country: United States
- State: Washington
- County: Okanogan County
- Protected area: Lake Chelan-Sawtooth Wilderness
- Parent range: Cascade Range
- Topo map: USGS Silver Star Mountain

Geology
- Rock age: 45 million years old
- Rock type: (Rapakivi texture) granite

Climbing
- First ascent: brothers Helmy and Fred Beckey, Walt Varney, June 17, 1942
- Easiest route: Scrambling via south ridge

Wallaby Peak is a 7,995-foot (2,437-metre) mountain summit located on the boundary line of the Lake Chelan-Sawtooth Wilderness, in Okanogan County, Washington. The mountain is part of the Methow Mountains, which are a subset of the Cascade Range. Wallaby Peak is situated on Kangaroo Ridge which is approximately two miles east and within view of Washington Pass. The nearest higher peak is Big Kangaroo, 0.86 mi (1.38 km) to the north. Precipitation runoff from the peak drains into Early Winters Creek, Cedar Creek, and North Fork Twisp River, all of which are tributaries of the Methow River.

== Climate ==
Most weather fronts originate in the Pacific Ocean, and travel northeast toward the Cascade Mountains. As fronts approach the North Cascades, they are forced upward (Orographic lift) by the peaks of the Cascade Range, causing them to drop their moisture in the form of rain or snowfall onto the Cascades. As a result, the west side of the North Cascades experiences high precipitation, especially during the winter months in the form of snowfall. During winter months, weather is usually cloudy, but, due to high pressure systems over the Pacific Ocean that intensify during summer months, there is often little or no cloud cover during the summer. Because of maritime influence, snow tends to be wet and heavy, resulting in avalanche danger.

== Geology ==
The North Cascades features some of the most rugged topography in the Cascade Range with craggy peaks, ridges, and deep glacial valleys. Geological events occurring many years ago created the diverse topography and drastic elevation changes over the Cascade Range leading to the various climate differences. These climate differences lead to vegetation variety defining the ecoregions in this area. The history of the formation of the Cascade Mountains dates back millions of years ago to the late Eocene Epoch. With the North American Plate overriding the Pacific Plate, episodes of volcanic igneous activity persisted. In addition, small fragments of the oceanic and continental lithosphere called terranes created the North Cascades about 50 million years ago. Wallaby Peak is located in the Golden Horn batholith and composed of granite like many of the peaks in the Washington Pass area.

During the Pleistocene period dating back over two million years ago, glaciation advancing and retreating repeatedly scoured the landscape leaving deposits of rock debris. The U-shaped cross section of the river valleys is a result of recent glaciation. Uplift and faulting in combination with glaciation have been the dominant processes which have created the tall peaks and deep valleys of the North Cascades area.

== See also ==
- List of Highest Mountain Peaks in Washington
- Geography of the North Cascades
- Geology of the Pacific Northwest

== Gallery ==
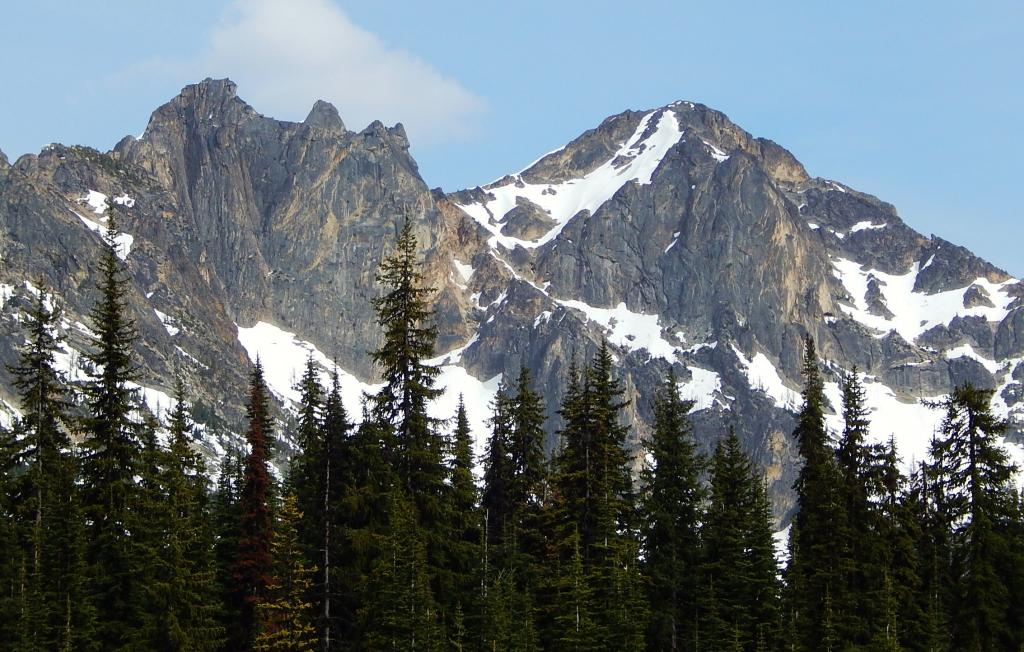
Half Moon and Wallaby Peak

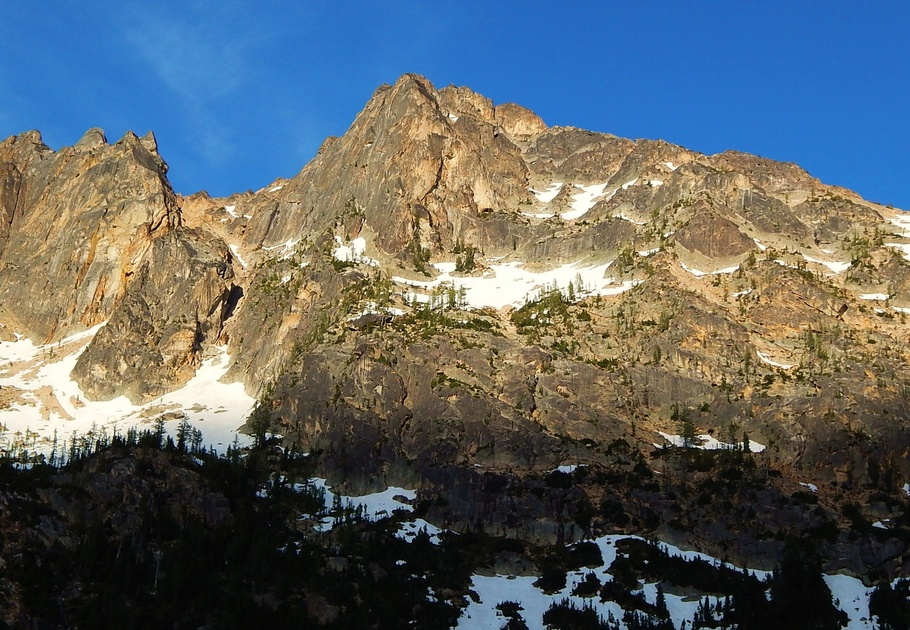
Wallaby Peak at sunset

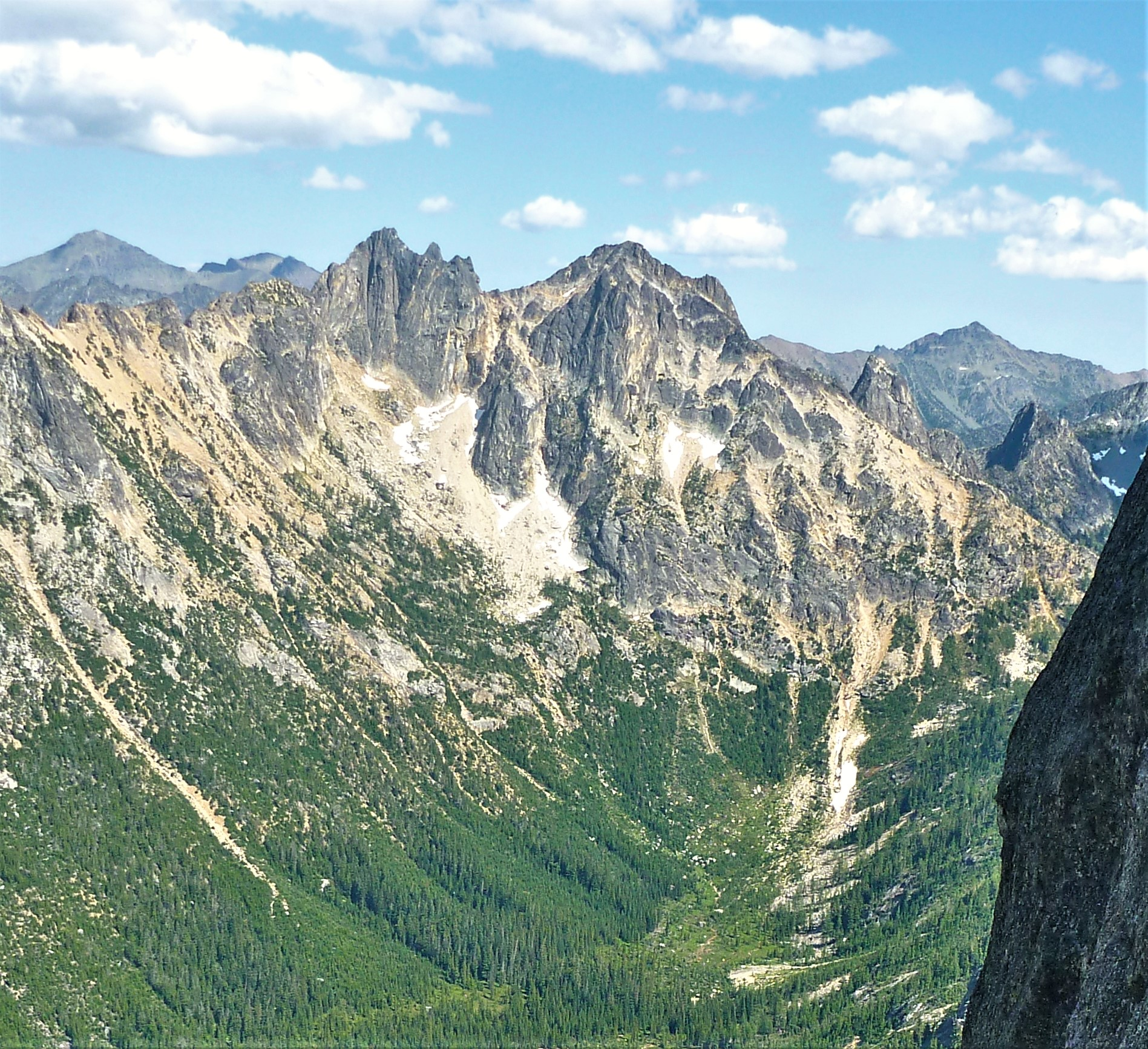
Half Moon and Wallaby Peak from Early Winters Spires

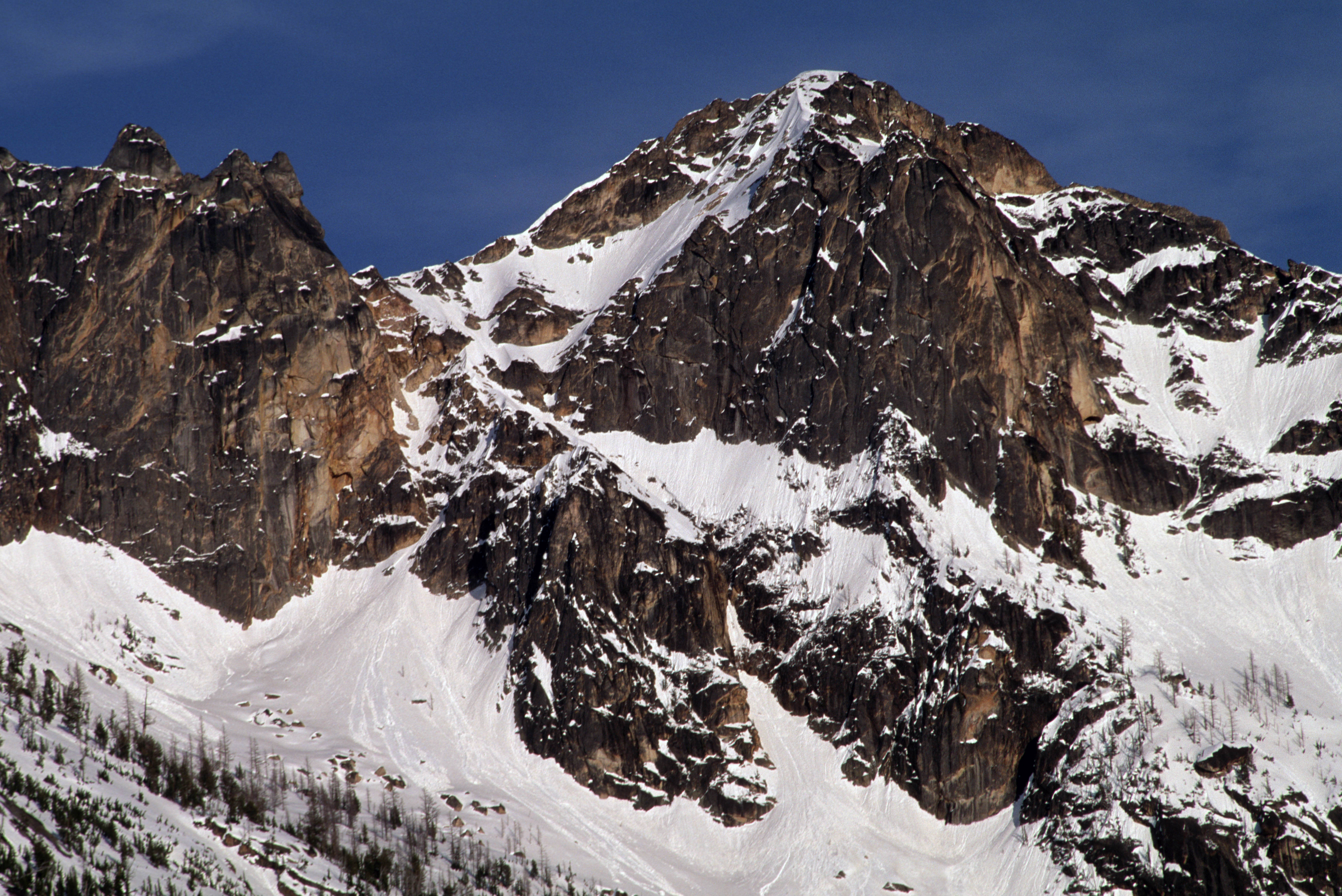
Wallaby Peak

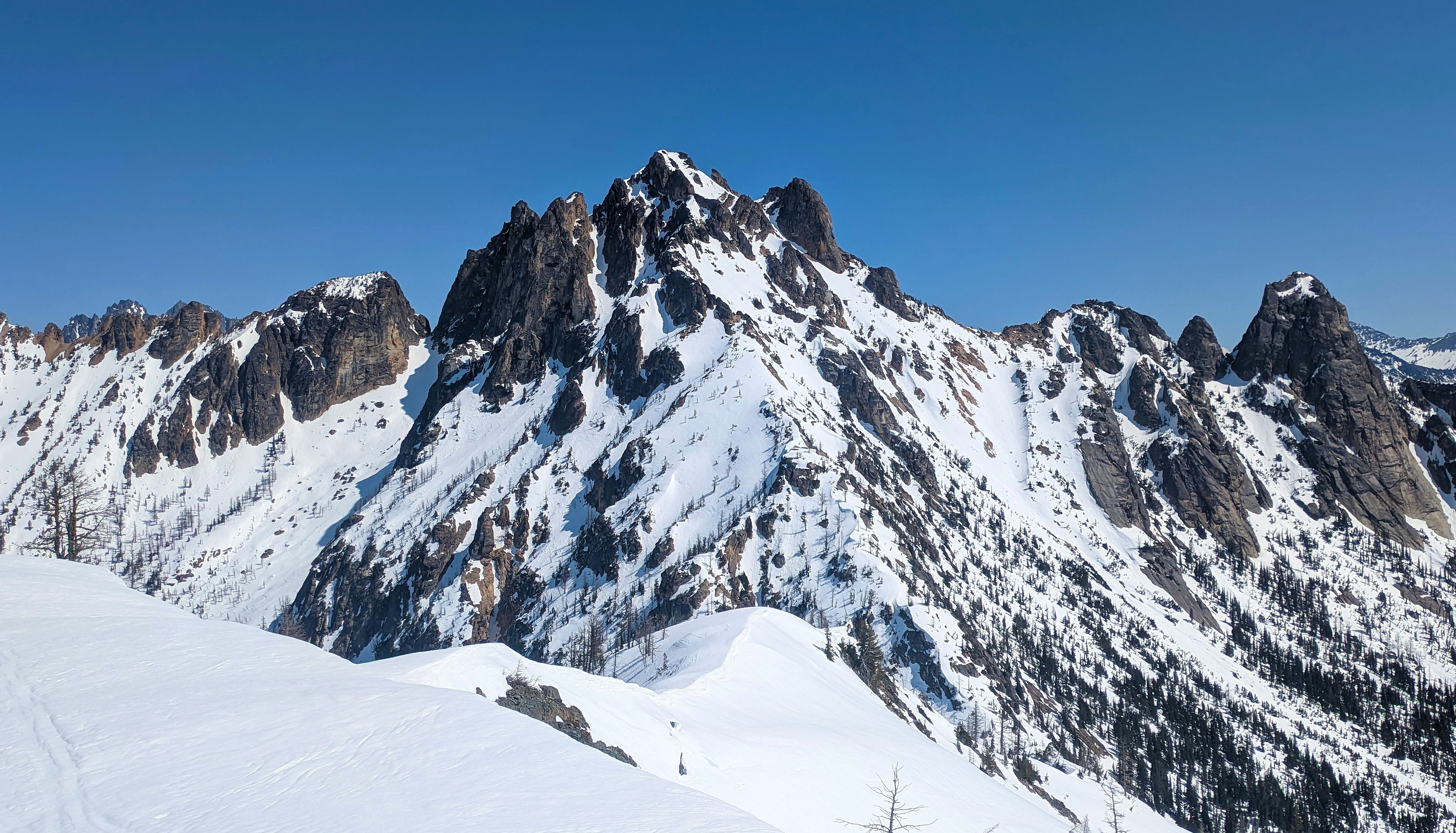
Southwest aspect
