= Half Moon (Washington) =

Mountain in Washington (state), United States

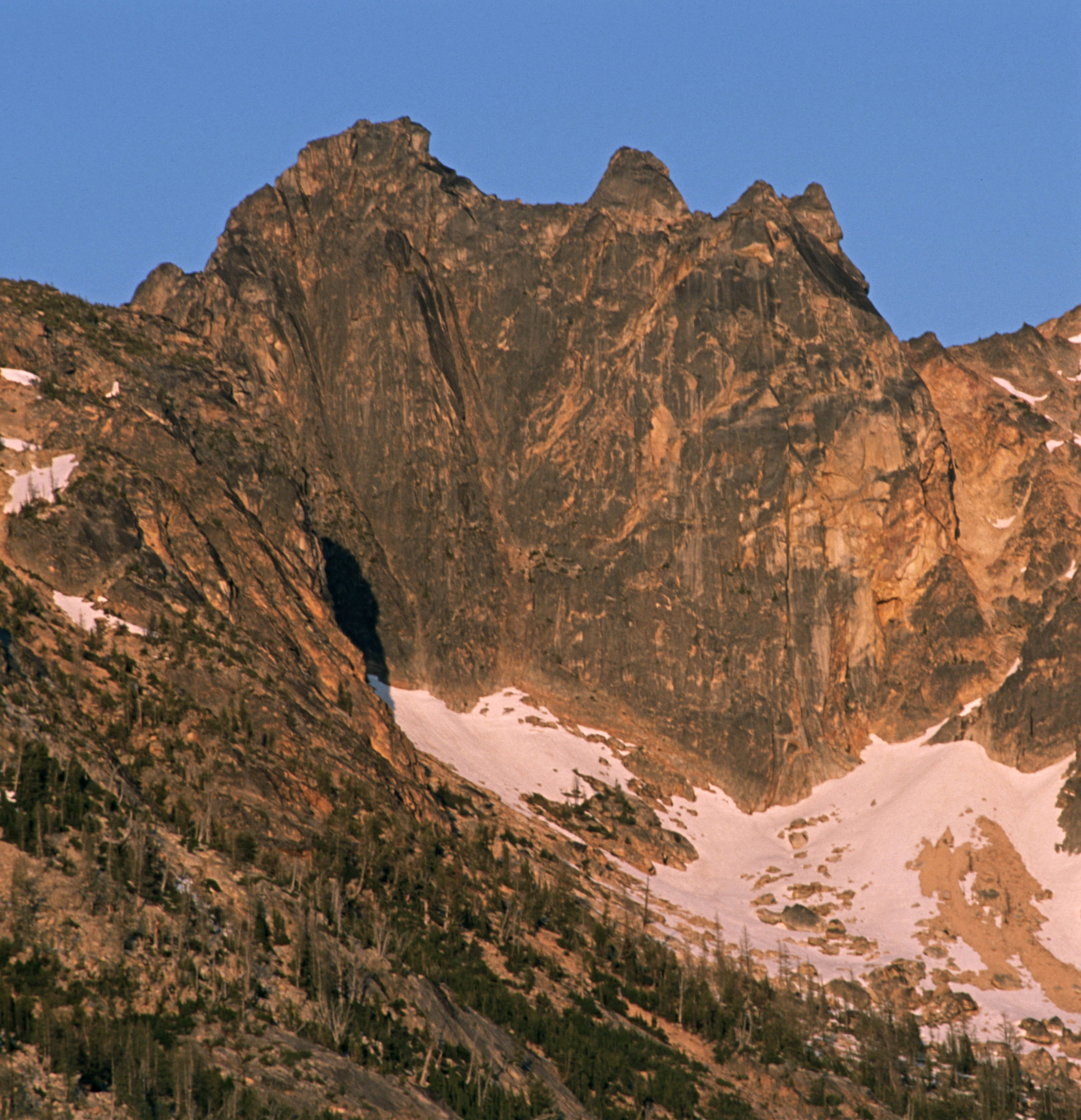
- Half Moon, west aspect

Highest point
- Elevation: 7,960 ft (2,430 m)
- Prominence: 200 ft (61 m)
- Coordinates: 48°30′36″N 120°36′49″W

Geography
- Location within Washington (state) Location within the United States
- Country: United States
- State: Washington
- County: Okanogan
- Protected area: Okanogan–Wenatchee National Forest
- Parent range: Cascade Range; North Cascades; Methow Mountains
- Topo map: USGS Silver Star Mountain

Geology
- Rock age: 45 million years old
- Rock type: (Rapakivi texture) granite

Climbing
- First ascent: brothers Helmy and Fred Beckey, Walt Varney, June 17, 1942
- Easiest route: Climbing class 5+

Half Moon is a 7,960+ ft (2,430+ m) summit located in Okanogan–Wenatchee National Forest, in Okanogan County, of Washington state. The mountain is part of the Methow Mountains, which are a subset of the Cascade Range. Half Moon is situated on Kangaroo Ridge which is approximately two miles east and within view of the North Cascades Highway at Washington Pass. The nearest higher neighbor is Wallaby Peak, 0.23 mi (0.37 km) to the south. Precipitation runoff from the peak drains into Early Winters Creek, and Cedar Creek, both of which are tributaries of the Methow River.

== Geology ==
The North Cascades features some of the most rugged topography in the Cascade Range with craggy peaks, ridges, and deep glacial valleys. Geological events occurring many years ago created the diverse topography and drastic elevation changes over the Cascade Range leading to various climate differences. These climate differences lead to vegetation variety defining the ecoregions in this area. The history of the formation of the Cascade Mountains dates back millions of years ago to the late Eocene Epoch. With the North American Plate overriding the Pacific Plate, episodes of volcanic igneous activity persisted. In addition, small fragments of the oceanic and continental lithosphere called terranes created the North Cascades about 50 million years ago. Half Moon is located in the Golden Horn batholith and composed of granite like many of the peaks in the Washington Pass area.

During the Pleistocene period dating back over two million years ago, glaciation advancing and retreating repeatedly scoured the landscape leaving deposits of rock debris. The U-shaped cross section of the river valleys is a result of recent glaciation. Uplift and faulting in combination with glaciation have been the dominant processes which have created the tall peaks and deep valleys of the North Cascades area.

== Climate ==
Weather fronts originating in the Pacific Ocean travel northeast toward the Cascade Mountains. As fronts approach the North Cascades, they are forced upward (Orographic lift) by the peaks of the Cascade Range, causing them to drop their moisture in the form of rain or snowfall onto the Cascades. As a result, the west side of the North Cascades experiences high precipitation, especially during the winter months in the form of snowfall. Because of maritime influence, snow tends to be wet and heavy, resulting in avalanche danger. During winter months, weather is usually cloudy, but due to high pressure systems over the Pacific Ocean that intensify during summer months, there is often little or no cloud cover during the summer.

== Gallery ==
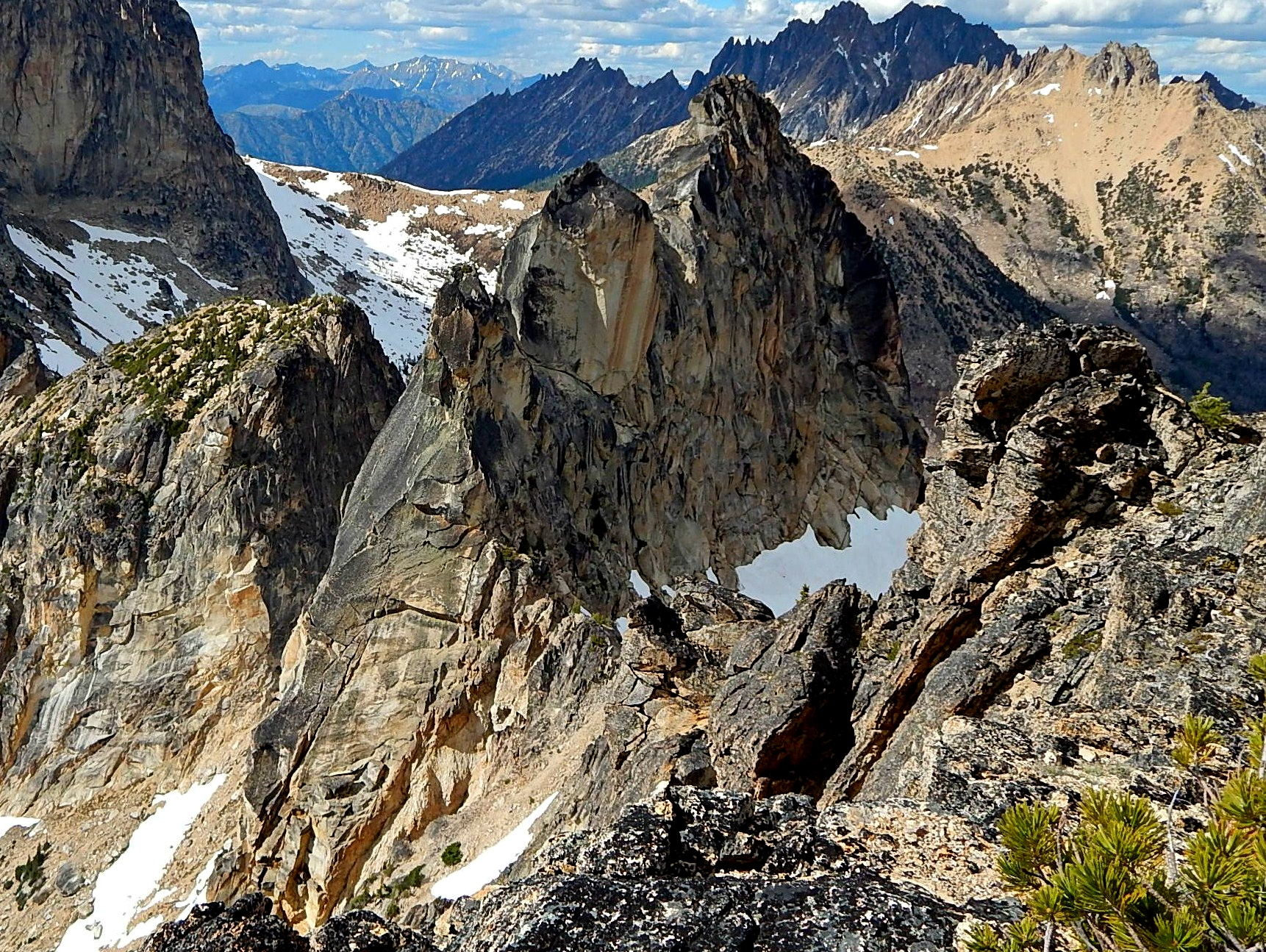
Half Moon seen from Wallaby Peak

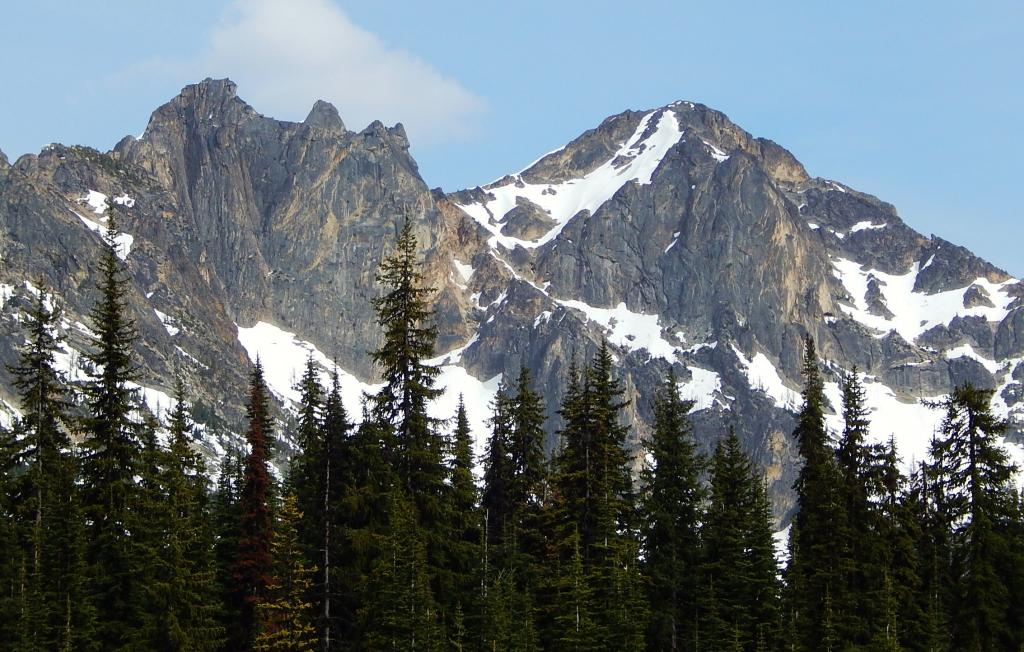
Half Moon (left) and Wallaby Peak

== See also ==
- List of Highest Mountain Peaks in Washington
- Geography of the North Cascades
- Geology of the Pacific Northwest
