= List of people from British Columbia =

Provincial flag of British Columbia

Map and location of British Columbia in Canada

This is a list of notable people who are from British Columbia, Canada, or have spent a large part or formative part of their career in that province.

== Premiers ==
See List of premiers of British Columbia.

== Members of Parliament ==
- Jim Abbott
- David Anderson
- Thomas Speakman Barnett
- Dave Barrett, former premier of British Columbia
- Ron Basford
- Don Bell
- Thomas Berger
- Hewitt Bostock
- Margaret Bridgman
- Chuck Cadman
- Iona Campagnolo, later lieutenant-governor of British Columbia
- Pat Carney
- Raymond Chan
- Mary Collins
- Chuck Cook
- Jean Crowder
- Nathan Cullen
- John Cummins
- Libby Davies
- Stockwell Day
- Amor De Cosmos, second premier of British Columbia
- Edgar Dewdney, later lieutenant-governor of British Columbia
- Herb Dhaliwal
- Ujjal Dosanjh, former premier of British Columbia
- Tommy Douglas
- John Duncan
- David Emerson
- Paul Forseth
- Hedy Fry
- Jim Gouk
- Gurmant Grewal
- Nina Grewal
- Herbert Wilfred Herridge
- Russ Hiebert
- Jay Hill
- Betty Hinton
- John Horgan
- Frank Howard
- William Irvine
- Pauline Jewett
- Peter Julian
- Douglas Jung
- Jim Karpoff
- Sophia Leung
- Gary Lunn
- Grace MacInnis
- Ian Alistair Mackenzie
- Roy MacLaren
- Len Marchand
- Keith Martin
- Gerry McGeer
- James Moore
- Henry Nathan Jr.
- Stephen Owen
- George Pearkes, later lieutenant-governor of British Columbia
- Art Phillips, former mayor of Vancouver
- Elmore Philpott
- John Reynolds
- Nelson Riis
- Svend Robinson
- Paul St. Pierre
- Tom Siddon
- Bill Siksay
- Bob Skelly
- Darrel Stinson
- Chuck Strahl
- Justin Trudeau, also prime minister of Canada
- John Turner, also prime minister of Canada
- Ian Waddell
- Mark Warawa
- Randy White

== Jurists ==
- Beverley McLachlin, chief justice of Canada
- Alfred Scow, First Status Indian judge, BC Provincial Court

== Other politicians ==
- Emery Barnes
- Wesley Drewett Black, provincial secretary 1952–1972
- Richard Blanshard, first governor of the Colony of Vancouver Island
- Rosemary Brown
- Frank Arthur Calder, First Nations MLA and Nisga'a politician
- Sir James Douglas, colonial governor (all colonies)
- Ginger Goodwin, Labour organizer
- Jennifer Granholm, Canadian/American politician and former governor of Michigan (2003–2011); naturalized US citizen
- Guujaaw, Haida politician, activist and cultural leader
- Edward John
- Arthur Kennedy, governor of the united colonies of Vancouver Island and British Columbia
- David Lam, philanthropist and lieutenant-governor
- Rafe Mair
- Grace McCarthy
- Joy McPhail
- Frederick Seymour, governor of Vancouver Island and of British Columbia
- Luke Everett Strimbold, youngest mayor in British Columbia history
- William Fraser Tolmie
- Joseph Trutch, colonial lieutenant-governor and first lieutenant-governor of the province of British Columbia

== Scientists ==
- Ian Affleck, physicist
- Robert Edward Bell, nuclear physicist
- Margaret Benston, chemist, computer scientist
- Michael Bigg, marine biologist
- Jim Chamberlin, aerodynamicist
- Ryan C.N. D'Arcy, neuroscientist
- Wade Davis, ethnobotanist
- James E. Gill, geologist
- John R. Hendricks, mathematician
- Abram Hoffer, biochemist, physician
- Frances Oldham Kelsey, pharmacologist
- Vit Klemes, hydrologist
- Mel Krajden, medical scientist
- Robert T. Lackey, fisheries scientist, ecologist, zoologist
- Robert Langlands, mathematician
- Jerrold E. Marsden, applied mathematician
- Bill Mathews, geologist, volcanologist, engineer
- Brian McConaghy, forensic scientist
- Ian McTaggart-Cowan, ecologist
- Patrick McTaggart-Cowan, meteorologist
- Faron Moller, computer scientist
- Barth Netterfield, astrophysicist
- Edward Faraday Odlum, geologist
- Santa J. Ono, biologist
- Robert Methven Petrie, astronomer
- Jerilynn Prior, medical scientist, endocrinologist
- Scott D. Sampson, paleontologist
- Martin Schechter, epidemiologist
- Robert Fletcher Shaw, engineer
- John Alexander Sinton, medical scientist, doctor, malariologist
- Frank Smith, psycholinguist
- Michael Smith, biochemist
- Wayne Smith, statistician
- David Suzuki, biologist, ecologist
- Robert Thirsk, engineer, physician, astronaut
- John Lancelot Todd, physician, parasitologist
- Bjarni Tryggvason, engineer, astronaut
- Paul Tseng, applied mathematician
- William Vickrey, Nobel Prize-winning economist
- Andrew Weaver, climate scientist
- Franklin White, public health scientist

== Television/film actors and musicians ==
- Daniel Adair, drummer
- Bryan Adams, singer
- Evan Adams, First Nations actor (Smoke Signals)
- Pamela Anderson, actress (Baywatch, V.I.P.)
- Aaron Ashmore, actor (Warehouse 13)
- Shawn Ashmore, actor (X-Men)
- Long John Baldry, musician, songwriter
- Bill Barlee, politician, TV host (Gold Trails and Ghost Towns)
- Bbno$, rapper
- Gil Bellows, actor
- Michael Bublé, singer
- Raymond Burr, actor (Perry Mason)
- Jim Byrnes, musician, actor (Highlander)
- Nicholas Campbell, actor (Da Vinci's Inquest)
- Chris Carter, screenwriter, producer, director (X-Files)
- Anna Cathcart, actress
- Kim Cattrall, actress (Sex and the City)
- Sarah Chalke, actress (Scrubs)
- Shannon Chan-Kent, voice actress
- Tommy Chong, actor, comedian, cannabis rights activist (Cheech & Chong)
- Hayden Christensen, actor (Star Wars)
- Claire Corlett, actress
- Ian James Corlett, voice actor
- Christian Convery, actor
- Gordon Cormier, actor (Avatar: The Last Airbender)
- Amanda Crew, actress (Silicon Valley)
- Thomas Middleditch, actor (Silicon Valley)
- Mackenzie Davis, actress (Terminator: Dark Fate)
- William B. Davis, actor (X-Files)
- Yvonne De Carlo, actress (The Munsters)
- Mac Demarco, musician, multi-instrumentalist
- Edward Dmytryk, film director
- James Doohan, actor (Star Trek)
- Brian Drummond, voice actor
- Atom Egoyan, film director
- Aryana Engineer, actress (Orphan)
- Jodelle Ferland, actress
- Nathan Fielder, comedian, actor
- Noel Fisher, actor (The Twilight Saga)
- Roy Forbes (Bim), musician
- Judith Forst, opera singer
- David Foster, songwriter, record producer
- Michael J Fox, actor, producer and health activist
- Nelly Furtado, singer-songwriter
- Chief Dan George, actor (Little Big Man, Cariboo Cowboy)
- Evan Goldberg, screenwriter (Superbad, Pineapple Express)
- Matthew Good, musician
- Grimes, musician
- June Havoc, actress
- Carter Hayden, actor and voice actor (Bakugan: New Vestroia, Total Drama)
- Bill Henderson, musician (Chilliwack)
- Ben Heppner, opera singer
- Matt Hill, Canadian-American voice actor
- Jacob Hoggard, musician (Hedley)
- John Ireland, actor
- Robert Ito, actor
- Joshua Jackson, actor (Dawson’s Creek)
- Carly Rae Jepsen, musician
- Avan Jogia, actor
- Alexz Johnson, singer, actress
- Alessandro Juliani, actor, voice actor
- Joe Keithley, musician, songwriter (D.O.A.)
- Allan King, film director
- Taylor Kitsch, actor and model (Friday Night Lights)
- Jett Klyne, actor
- Elias Koteas, actor (The Thin Red Line)
- Diana Krall, musician
- Kristin Kreuk, actress (Smallville)
- Nicholas Lea, actor (X-Files)
- Darryl Lenox, comedian
- Alex Lifeson, guitarist (Rush)
- Lights, musician
- Evangeline Lilly, actress (Lost, The Hurt Locker)
- Jessica Lowndes, actress (90210)
- Jessica Lucas, actress
- Alexander Ludwig, actor (Vikings, The Hunger Games)
- Leon Mandrake, illusionist (Mandrake the Magician)
- Sarah McLachlan, musician
- Brandon Jay McLaren, actor (Power Rangers: S.P.D., She's The Man)
- Rosa Mendes, model, professional wrestler
- Shay Mitchell, actress (Pretty Little Liars)
- Moka Only, rapper, singer and record producer
- Carrie-Anne Moss, actress (The Matrix)
- Meghan Ory, actress
- Molly Parker, actress (House of Cards)
- Barbara Parkins, actress
- Daniel Powter, musician, singer-songwriter, and pianist
- Jason Priestley, actor
- Kirsten Prout, actress
- John Qualen, actor
- Josh Ramsay, musician (Marianas Trench)
- Sophia Reid-Gantzert, actress and dancer
- Mike Reno, musician, songwriter
- Ryan Reynolds, actor (Green Lantern, Deadpool)
- Donnelly Rhodes, actor (Da Vinci's Inquest)
- Emily Bett Rickards, actress
- Seth Rogen, actor, comedian, writer, producer (Pineapple Express, Superbad, Knocked Up)
- Will Sasso, actor (Mad TV)
- Pablo Schreiber, actor (The Wire, Orange is the New Black)
- Drew Scott (Property Brothers)
- Jonathan Scott (Property Brothers)
- Michael Shanks, actor
- Nell Shipman, actress, film director
- Alexis Smith, actress
- Dallas Smith, musician
- Cobie Smulders, actress (How I Met Your Mother)
- Jewel Staite, actress
- Ryan Stiles, comedian, producer (Whose Line Is It Anyway?)
- Dorothy Stratten, actress, model
- Brad Swaile, voice actor
- Bobby Taylor, Motown singer (Bobby Taylor and the Vancouvers)
- Jon Mikl Thor, singer, performer and bodybuilder
- Meg Tilly, actress
- Jacob Tremblay, actor
- Daniel Wesley, musician
- Hudson Williams, actor (Heated Rivalry)
- Finn Wolfhard, actor, voice actor, musician (Stranger Things, It)
- Glenn Wool, stand-up comedian

== Athletes ==
- Karl Alzner
- Glenn Anderson, ice hockey player
- Jeevan Badwal
- Kevin Bahl
- Arshdeep Bains
- Peter Bakonyi (1933–1997), Hungarian-born Canadian Olympic fencer
- Tyson Barrie
- Mathew Barzal
- Jason Bay (born 1978), Canadian-American baseball player
- Russell Baze
- Connor Bedard
- Jamie Benn, ice hockey player
- Jordie Benn
- Zach Benson
- Allen Berg
- Mitch Berger (born 1972)
- Doug Bodger
- Isaac Boehmer
- Steve Bozek
- Tyler Breeze
- Rod Brind'Amour
- Laurent Brossoit
- Troy Brouwer
- Hy Buller (1926–1968), All Star NHL ice hockey player
- Kyle Burroughs
- Bowen Byram
- Macklin Celebrini
- Dennis Cholowski
- Brandon Clarke (1996-2026)
- Chase Claypool
- Dylan Coghlan
- Jon Cooper, NHL head coach
- Jon Cornish
- Angus Crookshank
- Nick Dasovic
- John Davison
- Adam Deadmarsh
- Ryan Dempster, baseball player
- Sunny Dhinsa
- Brenden Dillon
- Dillon Dube
- Ryan Ellis, ice hockey player
- Dante Fabbro
- Landon Ferraro
- Ray Ferraro
- Craig Forrest
- Jeff Francis
- Cody Franson
- Kaleigh Fratkin (born 1992), professional ice hockey player
- Freddy Fuller
- Dylan Garand
- Jenn Gardiner
- Danny Gare
- Jason Garrison
- Leah Goldstein (born 1969), Canadian-born Israeli professional road racing cyclist winner of the Race Across America, World Bantamweight Kickboxing Champion, and Israel Duathlon national champion
- Gage Goncalves
- Shaul Gordon (born 1994), Canadian-Israeli Olympic fencer
- Josh Gorges
- Chelsea Green
- Travis Green
- Nancy Greene
- Stu Grimson
- Dan Hamhuis
- Rick Hansen
- Rich Harden
- Danton Heinen
- Doug Hepburn, strongman
- Adin Hill
- Jevon Holland
- Ken Holland
- Shawn Horcoff
- Jordyn Huitema
- Dryden Hunt
- Daniel Igali
- Tij Iginla
- Vincent Iorio
- Barret Jackman
- Tristan Jarry
- Harry Jerome
- Nina Jobst-Smith
- Lucas Johansen
- Ryan Johansen
- Teyo Johnson
- Alistair Johnston
- Harry Jones
- Noah Juulsen
- Evander Kane
- Paul Kariya
- Steve Kariya
- Ethan Katzberg, Olympic shot-putter
- Izzak Kelly
- Alexander Kerfoot
- Jujhar Khaira
- Ben Kindel
- Olivia Knowles
- Chuck Kobasew
- Larry Kwong
- Jason LaBarbera
- Andrew Ladd
- Silken Laumann
- Brett Lawrie
- Curtis Lazar
- Angela Lee, mixed martial artist
- Christian Lee, mixed martial artist
- Bob Lenarduzzi
- Doug Lidster
- Cayden Lindstrom
- Adam Loewen
- Milan Lucic
- Rory MacDonald
- Liam Mackenzie
- Beck Malenstyn
- Cali Martinez
- Dysin Mayo
- Darren McCarty
- Curtis McKenzie
- Mark McMorris
- Fraser Minten
- Willie Mitchell
- Domenic Mobilio (1969-2004)
- Andy Moog
- Greg Moore
- Justin Morneau (born 1981), baseball player
- Brendan Morrison
- Steve Nash (born 1974), basketball player
- Cam Neely
- Kimberly Newell
- Rob Niedermayer
- Scott Niedermayer
- Michael Nonni
- Ryan Nugent-Hopkins
- Evan Olmstead
- Tyler O'Neill
- Pat Onstad
- Kyle O'Reilly
- Lui Passaglia
- James Paxton
- Simon Pond
- Vasek Pospisil
- Carey Price
- Joshua Ravensbergen
- Mark Recchi
- Gareth Rees
- Griffin Reinhart
- Max Reinhart
- Sam Reinhart
- Kevin Reynolds, figure skater; 2013 Four Continents champion and 2014 Winter Olympics team silver medalist
- Morgan Rielly
- Cliff Ronning
- Darcy Rota
- Joe Sakic
- Mike Santorelli
- Eli Schenkel (born 1992), Olympic fencer
- Justin Schultz
- Brent Seabrook
- Valter Sedin
- Niko Sigur
- Christine Sinclair
- Colton Sissons
- Justin Sourdif
- Paul Spoljaric, baseball player
- Logan Stankoven
- Kalib Starnes
- Troy Stecher, ice hockey player
- Ari Taub (born 1971), Olympic Greco-Roman wrestler
- John Tenta
- Shea Theodore
- Tiny Thompson
- Cliff Thorburn
- Devon Toews
- Conor Trainor
- Kyle Turris
- John van't Schip
- Jake Virtanen
- Aaron Volpatti
- Larry Walker, baseball player
- Ryan Walter
- Joel Waterman
- Jordan Weal
- Shea Weber
- Percy Williams, sprinter
- Parker Wotherspoon
- Tyler Wotherspoon
- Steve Yzerman (born 1965), ice hockey player
- Adam Zaruba

== Artists ==
- Hank Bull, painter
- Emily Carr, artist
- Kate Craig, artist
- Olea Marion Davis, ceramist, sculptor
- Iris Hauser (born 1956), painter
- Fred Herzog, photographer
- Clive Holden, poet, film director and visual artist
- Karen Jamieson, dancer and choreographer
- Beatrice Lennie, painter, sculptor
- Glenn Lewis
- Attila Richard Lukacs, artist
- Charles Marega, sculptor
- Len Norris, editorial cartoonist
- Sophie Pemberton, painter
- Bill Reid, artist
- David Rimmer, filmmaker
- Jack Shadbolt, artist
- Godfrey Stephens, artist
- Shane Wilson, artist

== Journalists and writers ==
- Doug Beardsley, poet and educator
- Bill Bissett, poet
- George Bowering, author
- Robert Bringhurst, poet
- Douglas Coupland, author (genX fiction)
- Janice Cowan
- Ranj Dhaliwal, author (crime-fiction)
- Ralph Edwards, naturalist/author (Caruso of Lonesome Lake)
- Timothy Findley, author
- Allan Fotheringham, columnist (politics, often satirical)
- Austin Gary, author
- William Gibson, author (Neuromancer)
- Terry Glavin, columnist/author and naturalist (ecology, fisheries, politics)
- John Stephen Hill, playwright Steve Hill (When I'm 64)
- Bruce Hutchison, editor/columnist and author (The Fraser)
- W.P. Kinsella, author/columnist (Shoeless Joe Goes To Iowa)
- Mark Leiren-Young, author/playwright/screenwriter (Never Shoot a Stampede Queen)
- Malcolm Lowry, novelist (Under the Volcano, October Ferry To Gabriola)
- Eswyn Lyster, genealogist and war bride author (Most Excellent Citizens, Trafford Press 2010)
- Keith Maillard, novelist, poet (Gloria, Motet, Two Strand River)
- Daphne Marlatt, poet
- Margaret Lally "Ma" Murray, editor, columnist
- Susan Musgrave, poet
- Kliph Nesteroff, writer, broadcaster
- Rohan O'Grady, novelist (Let's Kill Uncle, Pippin's Journal)
- Stan Persky, author and journalist
- Eden Robinson, novelist (Monkey Beach)
- Spider Robinson, author (science fiction)
- George Ryga, playwright (The Ecstasy of Rita Joe)
- Omar Sachedina, journalist and news anchor (CTV National News)
- Emily St. John Mandel, novelist
- Paul St. Pierre (Breaking Smith's Quarter Horse)
- Linus Sebastian, technology YouTuber (Linus Tech Tips)
- Robin Skelton, poet
- Lauren Southern, right-wing activist and YouTuber
- William Fraser Tolmie, HBC fur trade employee, medical doctor and later politician
- Margaret Trudeau, author
- Jack Wasserman, columnist (society, show business, politics)

== Others ==
- Brother Twelve
- Terry Fox
- Rick Hansen, athlete (Paralympic Games), activist, and philanthropist
- Keith Hunter Jesperson, the "Happy Face Killer"
- Mary John Sr.
- Masajiro Miyazaki, osteopath, coroner and "bush doctor"
- Christopher Paul Neil, Mr. Swirl
- Simon Nessman, model, activist
- Jim Pattison, businessman and Fortune 500 member
- Caspar Phair, Lillooet, pioneer and first government agent
- Robert Pickton, serial killer
- Jack Pickup, physician, the "flying doctor of British Columbia"
- Linus Sebastian, YouTuber (Linus Media Group)
- Amy Soranno, animal rights activist
- Arran Stephens, author; founder of Nature's Path
- Skip Triplett, former president of Kwantlen Polytechnic University
- Chris and Patrick Vörös, online personalities known as Da Vinki Twins
