= Taki Bluesinger =

Taki Sekiguchi (9 April 1943 – 30 January 2004), known professionally as Taki Bluesinger, was a lens-based artist from Fukaya City, Japan, whose artistic career was primarily based in Vancouver, Canada.

He immigrated to Vancouver in 1969 after refusing an assignment from Time Magazine to go to Vietnam. In Vancouver, he quickly got involved with artists' groups such as Intermedia and the New Era Social Club.

== Career ==
Sekiguchi participated in many collaborative photography, video, performance, and music projects. In the early 1970s, he travelled around the world with Glenn Lewis documenting gardens, which resulted in an exhibition and book, Bewilderness. In 1972, he participated in the work Background/This Place, in which he, along with Michael de Courcy, Gerry Gilbert, and Glenn Lewis, documented Vancouver through 360 photos. The images were printed in the Vancouver Sun. To mark the opening of the Burnaby Art Gallery's 1974 exhibition Videobag, Sekiguchi ran 9.3 miles from Vancouver City Hall to Burnaby Art Gallery. He was part of the group exhibitionYellow Peril Reconsidered, which was curated by Paul Wong and included the work of 25 Asian Canadian artists. The visual art components of the exhibition, including Sekiguchi's photographs, were on view at Contemporary Art Gallery and Artspeak, while videos were displayed at Or Gallery.

== Collections ==
Bluesinger's work is held in the permanent collection of the Musée des Beaux-Arts du Canada.
