= Isabelle Pauwels =

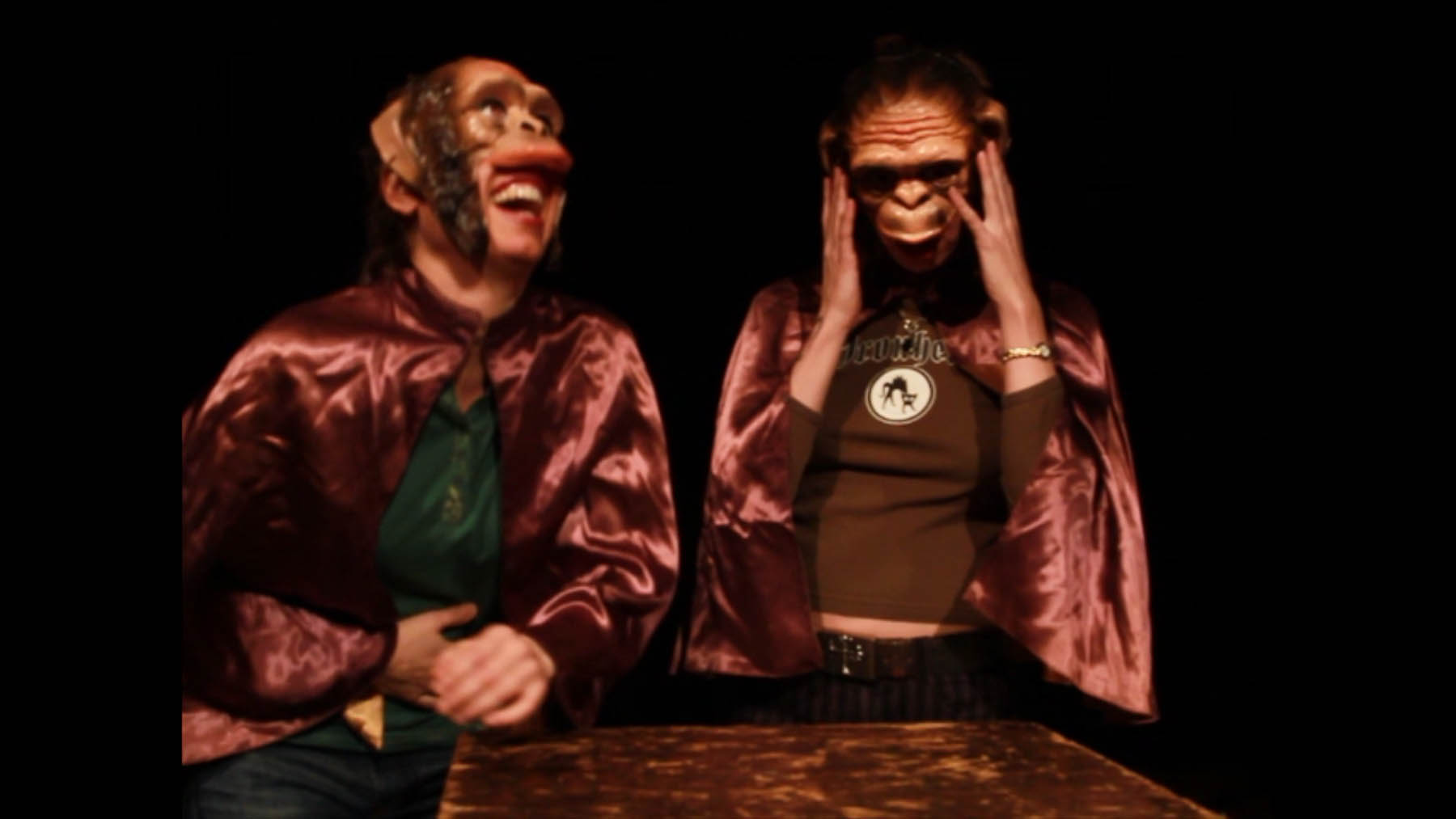
Isabelle and Valerie Pauwels, LIKE.../ AND, LIKE/ YOU KNOW/ TOTALLY/ RIGHT., 2012, video still, collection of the Morris and Helen Belkin Art Gallery.

Isabelle Pauwels (born 1975 in Kortrijk, Belgium) is a Vancouver-based artist who works primarily in video-based art. Pauwels received a BFA from the Emily Carr Institute of Art and Design and obtained an MFA from the Art Institute of Chicago. Pauwels' work explores narrative structures, forms of storytelling and how they shape moral and emotional experiences. The narrative in her work does not follow causality; instead it performs in a twisting loop that circles around itself.

== Career ==
Pauwel's first exhibition at Or Gallery in 2001 has been followed by multiple local and international exhibitions including at the Galerie Tatjana Pieters in Belgium, Power Plant in Toronto, Henry Art Gallery, and the Vancouver Art Gallery. In 2013, Pauwels was shortlisted for the Sobey Art Award. In 2008 Pauwels was one of eight artists in the Exponential Futures show at the Belkin Art Gallery, alongside Tim Lee, Alex Morrison, Kevin Schmidt, Mark Soo, Corin Sworn, Althea Thauberger and Elizabeth Zvonar.

=== Notable works ===
==== Like…/ and, like/ you know/ totally/ right ====
This video work was made by Pauwels in 2012, as a part of her 2011 Media Arts production residency at the Western Front Society. Performers in the video include her twin sister Valerie, Western Front co-founders Eric Metcalfe and Glenn Lewis, as well as Hank Bull, from the Western Front. Pauwels utilizes repetition, cliché, and satire, commenting on the oppressive dynamics of stories and storytellers. The work references the site specific histories of the Western Front and numerous other fictions while simultaneously pointing at the viewer and their act of looking.

==== W.e.s.t.e.r.n. ====
A video piece made in 2010, Pauwels juxtaposes film footage of the artist's parents' home in Richmond with home movies shot in her grandfather's home in the Belgian Congo. The video aims to create space for the viewer to negotiate colonial history that resonates throughout the film. The video is accompanied by stills that are a part of the collection of the National Gallery of Canada. The stills act as objects of evidence that simultaneously complicate and provide fragmentary evidence towards an understanding of the video projections.

==== ,000, ====
Through a residency with Experimental Media and Performing Arts Center Pauwels produced this work. The work debuted as a live performance which premiered at EMPAC in 2014, and was later adapted to a single channel video and a radio play.

=== Select solo exhibitions ===
- 2012 – LIKE…/ AND, LIKE/ YOU KNOW/ TOTALLY/ RIGHT., Grand Luxe Theatre, Western Front, Vancouver
- 2010 – Incredibly, unbelievably/The complete ordered field, Henry Art Gallery, Seattle
- 2008 – Triple Bill, Blackwood Gallery, U of T, Mississauga & Artspeak, Vancouver
- 2006 – Isabelle Pauwels, Catriona Jeffries Gallery, Vancouver
- 2004 – 37A Lisgar Street: A Few Situations, Mercer Union: A Centre for Contemporary Art, Toronto
- 2003 – Unfurnished Apartment for Rent, Contemporary Art Gallery, Vancouver
- 2001 – Untitled, Or Gallery, Vancouver

=== Select group exhibitions ===
- 2013 – Special Collection: Acquisitions and Archives, Morris and Helen Belkin Art Gallery, Vancouver
- 2012 – The Distance Between You and Me, 3 Artists from Vancouver, Los Angeles and Guadalajara, Vancouver Art Gallery
- 2011 – The Plot: Keren Cytter, Jos de Gruyter and Harald Thys, Isabelle Pauwels, The Power Plant, Toronto
- 2011 – Elastic Frames, Transmission Gallery, Edinburgh
- 2009 – Morality, Witte De With, Rotterdam
- 2008 – Keep the IS in FEMINISM, Contemporary Art Gallery, Vancouver
- 2008 – Exponential Future, Morris and Helen Belkin Art Gallery, Vancouver
- 2007 – The Lotus Eaters: New Vancouver Video Art, Western Front, Vancouver
- 2005 – White Noise: Sara Mameni and Isabelle Pauwels, State Gallery, Vancouver
