= Kate Craig =

Canadian video and performance artist (1947–2002)

- Born: September 15, 1947; Victoria, British Columbia
- Died: July 23, 2002 (aged 54); Storm Bay, British Columbia
- Education: Dalhousie University (1964–66)
- Known for: Performance artist; video artist; mail artist

Kate Craig (September 15, 1947 – July 23, 2002) was a Canadian video and performance artist, costume designer, and photographer. She was a founding member of the artist-run centre the Western Front, in 1973, and the artists-in-residence program in 1977. She supported the video and performance works of many artists while producing her own body of work. She is known for her performances such as "Lady Brute," and for her video works.

== Biography ==
Catherine Shand Craig was born on September 15, 1947, in Victoria, British Columbia. She was the third child of Sidney Osborne Craig (née Scott) and Charles Edward Craig. Her parents divorced in 1956. In 1960, her mother married Douglas Shadbolt, an architect and brother of the painter Jack Shadbolt. The family moved to Montreal and then to Halifax, Nova Scotia, where Craig attended Dalhousie University starting in 1961. University of Victoria (1966–1970) Craig quit her studies at Dalhousie in 1966 and began attending the University of Victoria the year after. Craig met the artist Eric Metcalfe at the University of Victoria, whom she married in 1969, as well as artist Dana Achtley who got her involved in the mail-art scene.

Craig and Metcalfe moved to Vancouver around 1971, where, along with friends and fellow artists Michael Morris, Vincent Trasov and Glenn Lewis, and composer Martin Bartlett, and architect Mo Van Nostrand, writer Henry Greenhow, they bought the space called the Knights of Pythias Lodge at 303 East 8th Ave, that became the Western Front in the Mount Pleasant area of Vancouver. Craig was, notably, the only female-identifying co-founder of Western Front.

Craig and Metcalfe separated in 1973, but continued to work together on collaborative projects. As a couple they worked on projects with Metcalfe, Lewis, Patrick Ready, Margaret Dragu and many others. Craig established and curated the Western Front's Artist-in Residence video program from 1977 to 1993. In the fall of 1973, Craig met artist Hank Bull and they would begin a relationship.

In addition to her role as the visual and performance artist, video and film maker, she designed costumes for herself and other artists which were worn in numerous performances.

From 1980 to 1981, Craig and Bull traveled through Indonesia, India, Africa, and Europe, performing Around The World in Over 365 Days. Craig married Bull in 1990 at her parents' home. Craig collected and kept many pieces of ephemera from her travels including cigarette boxes, stamps, and receipts.

Craig was passionate about her administrative and facilitative duties at Western Front, including vigilant record keeping, and believed it to be an integral part of her artistic practice. Even after retiring from her position as Curator of Media Arts in 1993, she kept up her involvement with the day-to-day duties at Western Front. Craig spent the late 1990s preparing for a major retrospective of her work at the Vancouver Art Gallery, entitled Skin. Craig's "idea of performance was always informed by community and based on thinking life is an art project", even at end of her life. She died of cancer in Storm Bay, British Columbia, in 2002.

== Performance art ==
=== Lady Brute ===
Eric Metcalfe was a fine arts student at the University of Victoria and Craig was drawn to his circle of artists and performers. In 1969, he created a mail art persona called "Dr. Brute", and Craig became "Lady Brute" also known as "Lady Barbara Brute." Kate Craig's persona, "Lady Brute," emerged in 1970 as a counterbalance to the sexual fixations of Eric Metcalfe's alter ego, Doctor Brute. Describing it as "undoubtedly a collaboration with Eric Metcalfe in the context of their marriage and shared lifestyle," she forged this persona as a distinct expression within their artistic partnership. This collaborative project created the fictional world of "Brutopia." Their collection of leopard material filled this world and the characters examined the foibles of western society. In 1972, Lady Brute appeared as the "Picture of the Week" in an issue of FILE magazine and marched in the Victoria Day parade in Victoria, British Columbia. Her performances were typically informal, happening in the real world rather than on stage. She would at times attend an opening or a dinner in her leopard regalia and that was the performance. In 1974, she performed "Flying Leopard" in Vancouver at Cates Park, and again on Hornby Island. In 1975, she produced her first video, "Skins: Lady Brute presents her Leopardskin Wardrobe".

In that same year, she and Metcalfe curated the exhibition "Spots Before Your Eyes" at the Western Front and A Space. The concept of camouflage, embodied by the leopard print motif present in both Craig and Metcalfe's works, carries nuanced implications. While Metcalfe's exploration, concealed beneath his persona, delved into uncovering repressed aspects of his identity, Craig's engagement with camouflage took a different trajectory. Her approach involved unmasking socially constructed gender norms through the tactic of masquerade, a notion later theorized by Mary Ann Doane. In Craig's portrayal, we witness a woman embodying and challenging the representation of the female body. Craig described the female personas stating, "The Lady Brutes were definitely image-bound. They still are." This could allude to the material circumstances of her performances. During a period when technology facilitated the rapid expansion and reach of international mass communication networks, the characters within the correspondence network were inherently tied to images. The statement also suggests the entrapment within identity categories' codes and conventions, which both precede and define us as social objects. Metcalfe and Craig's enactment of identities as Doctor Brute and Lady Brute serves as evidence that identity is "constituted and hence, capable of being constituted differently," highlighting the flexibility and fluidity of identity construction. Lady Brute continued to make appearances and participate in exhibitions through the 1970s.

- 1974 – Dr. and Lady Brute attended Hollywood Decadence and Art’s Birthday, Elk's Lodge, Los Angeles, performing with the Brute Saxes.
- 1975 – A guest appearance with the Hummer Sisters in Toronto
- 1975 – Ace Space Show at the Western Front
- 1976 – Dr. and Lady Brute, an evening of film video, slides and performance at the Art Gallery of Greater Victoria

=== Performance groups ===
In 1974, Craig was a founding member of the "ettes", a women's "postfeminist" performance group. They performed as the "Peanettes", a chorus of female peanut characters who each held a letter to spell the word "peanut", during Mr. Peanut's campaign for mayor of Vancouver. They also performed as the Coconettes and the Vignettes in 1975. She was a founder of the Lux Radio Players in 1974, a group involved in the collaborative writing and production of radio plays performed for live audiences and broadcast throughout North America over community radio stations until 1977. She was also a founding member of The Canadian Shadow Players in 1976, performing nationally and internationally until 1986.

==== Lux Radio Players ====
- 1974 – A Clear Cut Case at Western Front
- 1975 – A Bite Tonight, Planet of the Whales (for the sendoff party, first Green Peace Anti-Whaling expedition); and The Raw and the Plucked by Mary Beth Knechtel
- 1976 – Habitart, or How to Live with Your Just Desserts, commissioned by the Vancouver Art Gallery for the Habitat Festival
- 1976 – The Thief of Gladbag, commissioned and performed for the Judy Lamarsh Show on CBC Radio, at the Hotel Vancouver
- 1977 – Weather or Naught at the Western Front

==== Peanettes ====
- 1974 – performance with the Mr. Peanut's mayoral campaign

==== Vignettes ====
- 1975 – Amy Vanderbilt's Valentine's Ball at the Western Front
- Coconettes
- 1975 – Ace Space Show with Lady Brute at the Western Front

==== Canadian Shadow Players ====
- 1976 – The Exploits and Opinions of Dr. Faustroll, a commission by the City of Vancouver for the Habitat Festival, the production tours
- 1977 – The Exploits and Opinions of Dr. Faustroll at the Art Gallery of Greater Victoria
- 1978 – Vis-à-vis, a commission by The Music Gallery, Toronto, touring to Montreal, Ottawa, Hamilton, Vancouver and Victoria
- 1982 – Aka Nada, a commission by The Music Gallery, Toronto, touring to Montreal, Ottawa, Berlin, Santa Barbara, Innsbruck, and Lienz, Austria
- 1985 – Corpus Collossum, funded by the Department of External Affairs and the Holland Festival
- 1986 – The Pataphysics of Umbrology at the Centre for Creative Music, Mills College, Oakland, California

=== Performances ===
- 1973 – German T.V. Dinner, a performance by Western Front for German TV Network, film directed by Dr. W. von Bonin
- 1974 – Flying Leopard in Vancouver at Cates Park and on Hornby Island
- 1975 – Appeared as a Supreme Court judge in Errol’s Errors, Byron Black
- 1976 – 1980 – Guest spots on the HP dinner show, CFRO-FM, Vancouver
- 1976 – Presented solo evening of video, film and slides, Langton Street Gallery, San Francisco
- 1977 – Played drums for The Young Adults, a Vancouver-based punk band
- 1979 – A video of Flying Leopard on view at Video Inn during the Living Art Performance Festival, Vancouver
- 1979 – Performed At the End of the World, in collaboration with Hank Bull at the Robson Media Center, Vancouver
- 1980 – Appeared as a frumpy desk clerk in Colin Campbell's Peachland
- 1981 – Performed La Chaise des Memes, a shadow play in collaboration with Hank Bull
- 1982 – Appeared making a mandala in Ko Nakajima’s video Mandala 82
- 1984 – Appeared as herself in Marshalore’s video installation Album
- 1984 – Appeared as a flute player in Fraser Finlayson’s Come Fly with Sunny Day
- 1985 – Appeared as one of the respirating in Margaret Dragu’s video Breath

=== Photographic works ===
- 1977 – Flying Leopard, photo-serigraph on paper 18/24, Collection of the Burnaby Art Gallery

=== Solo exhibitions ===
- January 31 – May 3, 1998, Skin, Vancouver Art Gallery
- September 21 – October 20, 2002, Kate Craig, Charles H Scott Gallery

=== Group exhibitions ===
- February 14, 1989 – May 21, 1989: Rebel Girls: A Survey of Canadian Feminist Videotapes 1974–1988, National Gallery of Canada
- October 28 – November 1, 1998: Pinholes in Paradise: A Fundraiser for Presentation House Gallery
- January 24, 2000: Recollect, art from the permanent collection at the Vancouver Art Gallery

=== Costumes ===
1. Lady Brute and Dr. Brute, 1972
2. Shark Fin Swimming Caps, c.1973
3. Rubber Skirt, c.1973
4. Pink Dress, 1975
5. Pink Shirt, 1975
  - Pink Shirt was another part of Pink Poem and followed a similar ideology to straight jacket.
  - Pink Poem was a separation of Craig from Lady Brute with the goal to redefine her artistic practice.
6. Pink Vest, 1977
  - Craig created Pink vest and wore for Young Adults (1977) video production.Young Adults was a single-channel video production showcasing an impromptu punk rock band that existed solely on videotape. The band members included Terry Ewasiuk, Elizabeth Vander Zaag, and Monica Holden-Lawrence on vocals, David Larson on guitar, Michael Wonderful on Mini-moog, Kate Craig on drums, Hank Bull on piano, and Monica Holden-Lawrence also contributing on cello.
7. Piranha Farm, 1978
  - Kate Craig created the Piranha Farms Costume for a 1978 performance featuring Eric Metcalfe, Hank Bull, and Jane Wilson. This underwater fantasy performance incorporated elements of dance, music, costumes, video and shadow play. The production toured Canada and was also showcased at The Kitchen in New York.
  - The costume is composed of a horizontally patterned orange hooded cape, with its defining feature being the meticulously crafted hood, shaped into the likeness of a Piranha.
  - It features a sizable opening for the wearer’s visage, encircled by teeth sewn from silver fabric and plastic “googly” eyes positioned on both sides of the face.
  - The Piranha Farms costume transcends its material form, becoming a conduit for exploring Craig’s vision and the cultural milieu of its time. The seventies have come to be known culturally as the “Canadian renaissance” and signaled moments of historical rupture for society and culture
  - This period was marked by experimentation and boundary-pushing in the arts, with artists challenging traditional norms and embracing avant-garde techniques. "Piranha Farms" likely emerged within this context of artistic exploration and innovation, reflecting the zeitgeist of the era. Moreover, the seventies marked an exceptional period for the development of video art in Vancouver’s art scene, and this cultural milieu also played a significant role in shaping the evolution of Kate Craig's Piranha Farms costume
  - The Piranha Farms costume was worn by Eric Metcalfe as the Titular character of Piranha Farms, alongside his collaborators Hank Bull and Jane Ellison. Metcalfe can be seen wearing the costume in a 1979 recording of Piranha Farms, digitized by Western Front
8. Straight Jacket, 1980
  - Craig recounted that due to the amount of sewing required to create the costume, the satin acetate became a strong, very tight material. Craig chose the pink material as she believed that pink clothing was psychologically calming, and sought to go against the prejudice of using the colour pink at the time.

== The Western Front ==
In 1973, Kate Craig and seven other artists (Martin Bartlett, Mo van Nostrand, Henry Greenhow, Glenn Lewis, Eric Metcalfe, Michael Morris, and Vincent Trasov) purchased the former Knights of Pythias lodge hall and founded the Western Front Society. An artist-run centre, The Western Front became a centre for artistic exploration in many disciplines. Craig was "acutely aware" of her position as the only woman-identifying co-founder of Western Front and worked to invite other female artists to work there including Margaret Dragu, Granada Venne, Sanja Ivekovic, Gathie Falk, etc.

In 1976, Kate Craig took charge of organizing the Western Front's video production studio. The following year, she established and curated the Artist-in-Residence Video program. Craig's significant administrative role within the society, her leadership in video production, and her prominence as a performance and video artist in Vancouver all contributed to the establishment of a strong presence of local, national, and international women artists at the Western Front. Among the women who have been actively involved with the Western Front over the years are:

- Jane Ellison
- Daina Augaitus
- Elizabeth Vander Zaag
- Karen Henry
- Annette Hurtig
- Susan Milne
- Babs Shapiro
- Cornelia Wyngaarden
- Elizabeth Chitty
- Margaret Dragu
- Mary Beth Knechtel
- Judy Radul

One notable collaboration of Craig's is the performance "Back up," which she co-created with Margaret Dragu. This performance encompassed a variety of activities and narratives, challenging gender stereotypes and exploring new roles enacted by women. Without overtly political themes, Craig and Dragu portrayed the lifestyles of schoolgirls, pool-hall tough girls, scientists, upper-class debutantes, and domestics. Craig established and curated an Artist-in-Residence video program in 1977. In addition to creating her own work, she fostered and produced video works with an impressive array of Canadian and international artists, including Stan Douglas, Mona Hatoum, Tony Oursler and Robert Filliou. In 1993, she retired from her position as Curator of Media Arts.

The Western Front continues to support exhibitions, concerts, workshops, performances, and maintains an extensive media archive.

Craig's works have continued to be showcased by the Western Front. These include:

- 2023 — Backup (1978), created with Margaret Dragu, shown as part of Archives Access: Margaret Dragu
- 2015 — shown as part of To Build a Better City: Selected Films about Art and Urban Development
- 2008 — Delicate Issue (1979), shown as part of Perspectives on an Archive: Ghost Dialogues

The Western Front's legacy site also continues to host a video of Craig's Straight Jacket.

== Video works ==
- 1975 – "Skins: Lady Brute Presents her Leopardskin Wardrobe" (b/w, 60 min.)
- 1976 – "Still Life: A Moving Portrait" (colour, 30 min.)
- 1977 – The Young Adults
- 1978 – "Backup" in collaboration with Margaret Dragu (colour, 36 min.)
- 1979 – "Delicate Issue" (colour, 12 min.)
- 1979 – "Clay Cove, Newfoundland" (b/w, 20 min.)
- 1980 – "Straight Jacket" (colour, 7:08.)
  - Shown at Western Front (1980), Festival ‘82 (A Celebration of Women in the Arts)(1982), and at Vancouver Art & Artists at the Vancouver Art Gallery (1983).
  - "Straight Jacket" was a collaborative project with Elizabeth Chitty as a lighting workshop. Craig set up the camera in a fixed position, whilst Chitty, with one quartz light, “danced with” Craig during the filming. Video monitors were set up for the pair to see the results as they “played with light and movement”. The accompanying song was written after filming.
- 1983 – "Canada Shadow" in collaboration with Hank Bull
- 1986 – "Ma"
- 1989 – "Mary Lou"

== Kate Craig fonds ==
In the spring of 2016, the Western Front Archives received a significant donation from Hank Bull: the Kate Craig fonds. This collection encompasses a diverse array of materials spanning Kate Craig's life, research, and career. Among the contents are original costumes, intricate embroidery pieces, photographs capturing pivotal moments, ephemera documenting various events, press releases and clippings offering insights into her reception, meticulously kept sketchbooks and drawings showcasing her creative process, artworks reflecting her artistic vision, and a comprehensive collection of video and audio recordings capturing her performances and explorations. Together, these items provide a rich tapestry of Craig's artistic journey and contributions to the cultural landscape.

== Memorialization ==
Craig, who died from cancer at the age of 54, was memorialized by composer and friend George E. Lewis. Commissioned by PuSh International Performing Arts Festival to write a new musical score for Craig's video installation Mary Lou, Lewis struggled to "do right" by Craig. The soundtrack ultimately matched the fusion of documentary video and abstraction in Craig's work, as Lewis divided took a minimalist approach to the score, focusing on repeating motifs that complimented the static-like imagery in Mary Lou.
