= Helen Goodwin =

Helen Goodwin (July 14, 1927 – December 18, 1985) was an English-born, British Columbia-based artist, dancer, teacher, and organizer who specialized in dance and choreography. Goodwin was an active member of Vancouver experimental art community in the 1960s and 1970s, organizing and performing at festivals, exhibitions and artist-run centres. She is best known for co-founding Intermedia and for forming TheCo, a dance troupe.

== Biography ==
Goodwin was born on July 14, 1927, in England, where she was trained in Laban movement analysis. She moved to Vancouver in 1955. That year, she became a faculty member at the University of British Columbia (UBC) in the Physical Education Department, and taught stage movement with the Theatre Department. She taught at The University of British Columbia for almost 20 years.

In 1970, Goodwin moved to New York City where she was asked to chair the Dance Department of New York University's Tisch School of the Arts.

== Projects ==
Goodwin was involved in the organization of the Festival of Contemporary Arts at UBC, in February 1965. The festival was nicknamed The Medium is the Message (after Marshall McLuhan's work).

In 1965, Goodwin along with Al Neil and Sam Perry founded the Sound Gallery and Goodwin founded her dance troupe, TheCo. Perry committed suicide at the end of 1966 and Sound Gallery dissolved.

In 1967, Intermedia was incorporated as a non-profit society under the BC Societies Act, which was the first artist-run centre in Canada to receive funding from the Canada Council for the Arts. Goodwin was a founder and member of the Board of Directors.

Goodwin was known for collaborating with other artists to create “environments” with which her dance troupe, TheCo, would interact. In 1968, the Vancouver Art Gallery hosted Intermedia Nights, where TheCo (including Evelyn Roth) performed Plus Minus 216 and A Space.

The Intermedia Spring Show - Dome Show was exhibited between May 19-31, 1970, and included Goodwin's work, City Feast, which involved participants from around the city to engage in communal dining, conceptualized as "an experiment in large-group choreography".

In 1971, Goodwin created and directed Environmental Opera, a performance by TheCo and other artists at Spanish Banks on June 21.

== Death and legacy ==
On December 18, 1985, Goodwin drowned herself near Spanish Banks in Vancouver. On December 21, 1987, at 3:45pm, Winter Solstice was performed in her memory at the Museum of Anthropology at UBC. She was described in The Province as "one of the prime forces in new and experimental art in Vancouver in the 1960s and 1970s."

In 2018, Goodwin was a subject for the exhibition, Beginning with the Seventies: Radial Change, curated by Lorna Brown at the Morris and Helen Belkin Art Gallery at UBC. The exhibition featured a work by artist Evann Siebens, titled Plus TheCo, Minus Helen Goodwin.

== Notable works ==
- Plus Minus 216 (1968) at the Vancouver Art Gallery
- Pas de Deux (1968)
- A Space (1968) at the Douglas Gallery and Vancouver Art Gallery
- City Feast (1970)
- Environmental Opera (1971) at Spanish Banks
