= Intermedia (artists' association) =

Arts organization based in Vancouver, British Columbia, Canada

Intermedia was a Canadian artists' association active in the late 1960s and early 1970s, based in Vancouver, British Columbia.

Intermedia was a loose association of Vancouver artists who worked in a variety of media, collaborated on and staged events. It was founded in 1967 by Jack Shadbolt and Glenn Lewis, among others. At the time of its inception Intermedia aimed to create a centre of community resource in Vancouver where artists, architects, engineers, technologists and educators could come together and explore new models and formats for the purpose of intensifying and expanding the effectiveness of creative sensibility in the community. Critics believe it was "steeped in the media culture of Marshall McLuhan. As time passed the aims of the group changed to focus on individual artists and small groups:

The purpose/aim of Intermedia is to help the artist realize [their self] and [their] work by providing an umbrella/shelter of cooperatively-structured, contiguous and inter-related functioning artists' groups, often service-oriented.

The Intermedia headquarters was located at 575 Beatty Street in downtown Vancouver.

In 1968, the Vancouver Art Gallery hosted Intermedia Nights, a four-day festival of Intermedia works, in 1969, the Electrical Connection, and in 1970, the Dome Show. The artists associated with Intermedia explored different techniques, including performance art, experimental film, correspondence art, and other media. In 1970, the Vancouver Art Gallery hosted 12 Intermedia Days.

In 1973, Intermedia ceased to function as an organization.

== Associated artists ==
Artists associated with Intermedia included:

- Joan Balzar
- Audrey Capel Doray
- Judith Copithorne
- Michael de Courcy
- Gathie Falk
- Maxine Gadd
- Helen Goodwin
- Glenn Lewis
- Gary Lee-Nova
- Evelyn Roth
- Dallas Selman
- Jack Shadbolt
- Dennis Vance
- Ed Varney
