= Social justice art =

Social justice art, and arts for social justice, encompasses a wide range of visual and performing art that aim to raise critical consciousness, build community, and motivate individuals to promote social change. Art has been used as a means to record history, shape culture, cultivate imagination, and harness individual and social transformation. It can not only be a means to generate awareness, but it can also be a catalyst to engage community members to take action around a social issue.

Social justice art allows people to develop agency to interrupt and alter oppressive systemic patterns or individual behaviors. The processes by which people create and engage with art equips them with analytic tools to understand and challenge social injustices through social justice education (teaching for social justice), community building, and social activism/social movements. Examples of visual and performing social justice art includes: drawing, painting, sculpture, murals, graffiti, film, theater, music, dance, spoken word, etc.

== Background ==
Art has played a role in social justice education, community building, and social activism/social movements. It provides a universal language that gives voice to individuals and communities and is accessible across social boundaries. These examples can overlap and are not strictly confined to one specific category.

== History ==
Two well-known art movements that have utilized art as a means to work towards social justice are the Black Arts Movement and Chicano art movement. Both movements began to enter into public consciousness during the 1960s. The Civil Rights Movement in combination with the Black Power Movement helped to propel the Black Arts Movement. One of the main goals of this movement was to support Black Nationalism and mobilize the community towards social action. This period produced an increase in Black poetry, literature, and music. A few key figures of the movement were; author Marcus Garvey, author and artist Charles S. Johnson, revolutionary artist Emory Douglas, and social dancer and choreographer Katrina Hazzard-Gordon. The efforts to incorporate post–Mexican Revolution notions with current Mexican American social, political, and cultural issues drove the Chicana/Chicano Arts Movement. Murals are a form of visual art that experienced a rise in popularity during this movement. Chicana/Chicano mural art became a means of working towards political goals, challenging stereotypes, as well as a way for community members to play an active role in creating community memoirs. Diego Rivera was one prominent figure who helped to establish Mexican muralism.

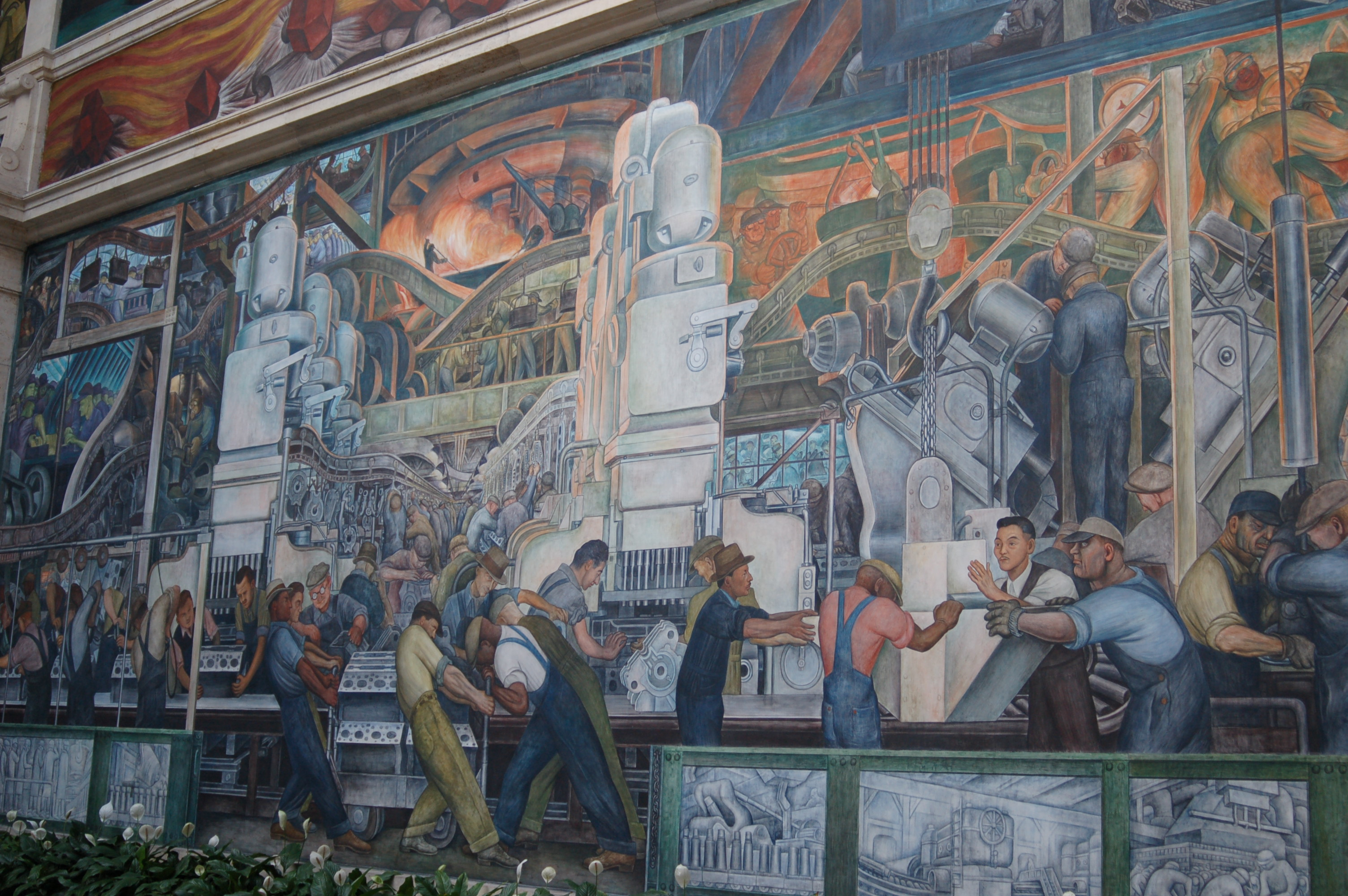
Diego Rivera – Detroit Industry Murals

=== Social justice education ===
Social justice education is an educational approach that focuses on fostering awareness of social injustices and how inequalities impact youth. Social justice education saw its roots in the ideas of Paulo Freire, author of Pedagogy of the Oppressed. In his work, Freire highlights the theoretical ideas of critical pedagogy, which is an approach that combines education and critical theory. This approach is relevant to social justice art education because it combines the critique of social injustices and the use of art as a mechanism to engage with social issues.

==== Culturally relevant arts education ====
Culturally relevant arts education (CRAE) is an education model that emerged from the Tubman Theater Project, a culturally relevant drama program in which African American middle and high school students examine their internalized oppression and work to create positive racial identities. The program gives them the opportunity to learn from rehearsing and performing plays based on their lived experiences. This framework incorporates six different pedagogies. Three of these are art related; arts production, aesthetics, and arts integration as well as three non-art related; multicultural education, critical pedagogy, and contextual teaching and learning. CRAE engages both students and educators in a process in which they reflect on their social position in societal liberation and subjugation.

=== In higher education ===
Several universities have introduced social justice arts programs:

- University of San Francisco – Performing Arts & Social Justice Major
- Santa Clara University – Arts for Social Justice
- University of Michigan – The Prison Creative Arts Project

=== Community building ===
Sense of community is built through bridging geographic or interest-driven relationships. Building community helps individuals come together to challenge inner oppressive dynamics that have been imposed by institutions, structures and bodies. These inner oppressive dynamics have been termed “social ghosts” have been referenced in dance literature and function as a key theme within many community building art projects. Art for community building is a collective effort in which the art making process strengthens community ties.

- AIDS Memorial Quilt
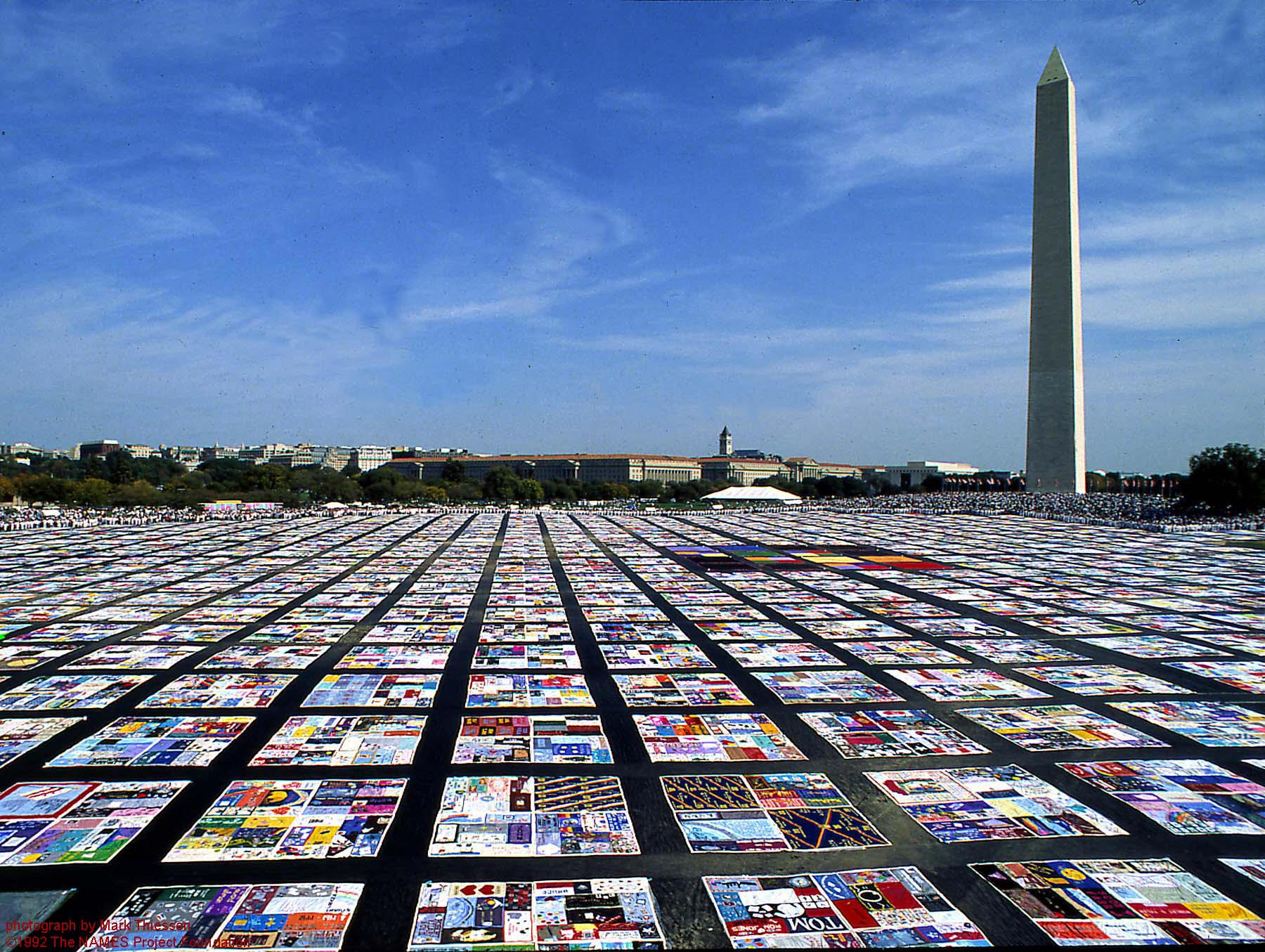
  Aids Quilt
- Oral History
- Mural Art
- Dance
  - Martha Graham Dance Company's 'Political Dance Project'
  - Karen Jamieson's Carnegie Dance Troupe
- Theatre
  - In the Heart of the Beast Puppet and Mask Theater
  - Theater of the Oppressed
  - The Pride Youth Theater Alliance
  - People's Theatre Project – Social Change through the Arts
- Photovoice
  - Photovoice Projects
  - Detroit Youth Passages Photovoice Project
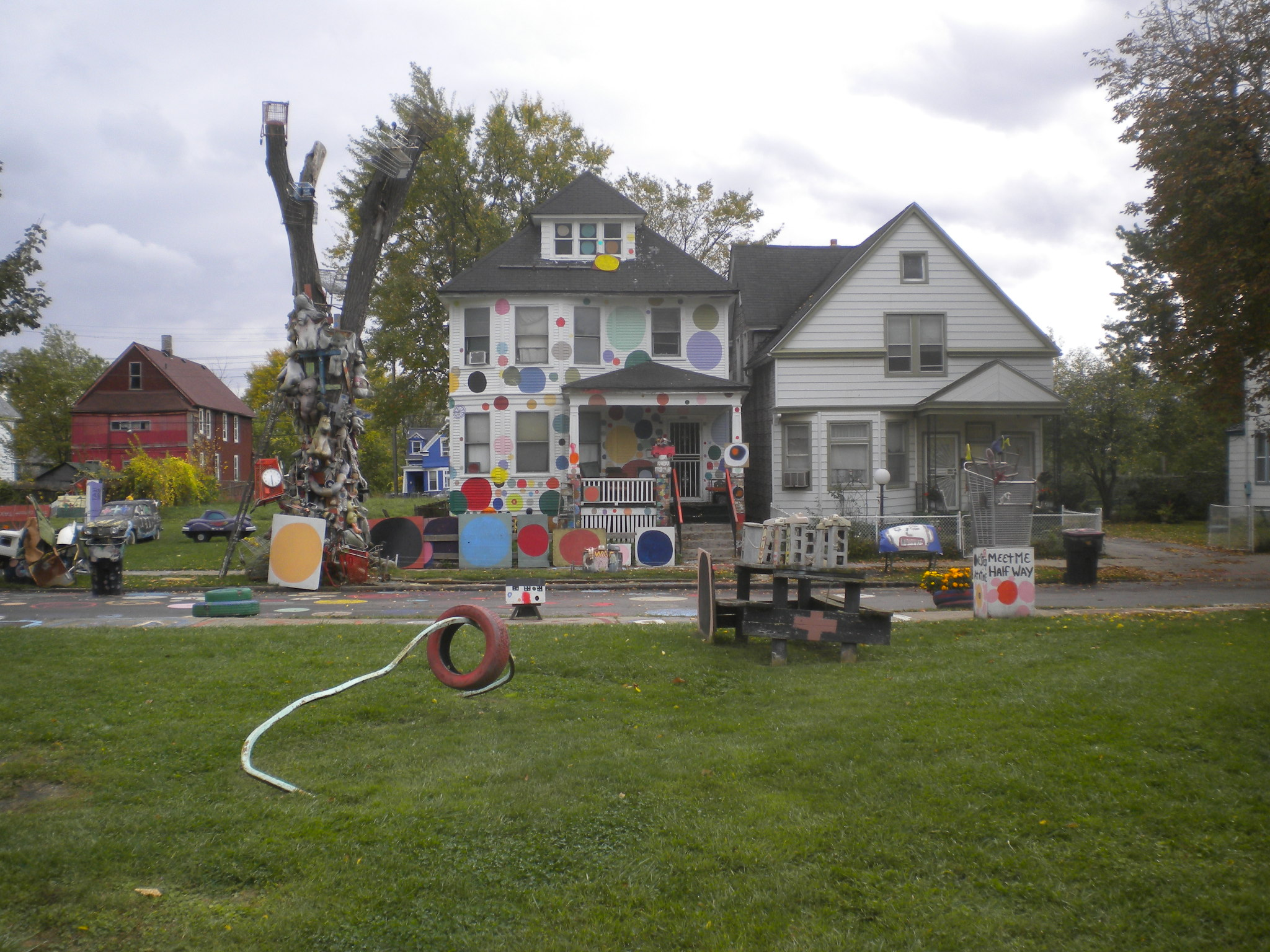
- Heidelberg Project
  Heidelberg Project

=== Social activism/social movements ===
- Black Movement
  - Amiri Baraka
  - Black Arts Repertory Theatre
- Feminist Movement
  - Rosie the Riveter
- Chicana/Chicano Movement
  - La Raza
  - Dia De Los Muertos
  - Low Rider Art
- LGBT Rights and Gay Liberation
  - AIDS Memorial Quilt
  - Allen Ginsberg
