= Eric Metcalfe =

Canadian artist

- Born: Eric William Metcalfe; August 22, 1940 (age 86); Vancouver, British Columbia
- Occupations: Visual and performance artist
- Known for: Dr. Brute
- Notable work: Jazz and Gargoyle series
- Website: http://www.ericmetcalfe.ca/

Eric Metcalfe is a Canadian visual and performance artist.

== Early life ==
Eric Metcalfe was born in Vancouver, British Columbia and grew up in Victoria, British Columbia. He travelled to Europe in 1960 and 1961, and on his return, worked as a truck driver for five years. He then met Maxwell Bates in 1966 who encouraged him in his practise as an artist. On a scholarship he entered the University of Victoria in 1967 and studied for three years with artists such as Dana Atchley and Peter Daglish, among others (1967-1971) graduating with his B.F.A. in 1971.

== Career ==
With artists such as Hank Bull, Michael Morris, and Vincent Trasov, he explored comic book-style drawings and Fluxus conceptual art. In the 1970's, Metcalfe and Kate Craig to whom he was married (in 1969) started performing under the persona Dr. Brute and Lady Brute. They went dressed in leopard print to art openings and played leopard print instruments with the Brute Sax Band. They also collected examples of leopard print imagery from art, advertisements, magazines, and everyday life, and distributed them through a mail-art network. Metcalfe called their project to cover the world in leopard spots "Brutopia". In 1973, Metcalfe was one of the eight original founders of the Western Front Society.

In 2021, the University of Victoria held an exhibition titled Pop Anthropology of Eric Metcalfe’s oeuvre, spanning over sixty years, in celebration of the artist’s honorary doctorate (UVic DFA 2021, BFA 1970). It honoured his years as a student in Visual Arts at the University of Victoria in the early 1970s, as well as his lifetime achievements as a pioneer in performance art in western Canada and co-founder of the Western Front.

The Eric Metcalfe fonds is in the collection of the Morris and Helen Belkind Gallery, Vancouver.

== Awards ==
- 2000 Victor Martyn Lynch-Staunton Award from the Canada Council.
- 2006 Audain Prize for Lifetime Achievement in the Visual Arts
- 2008 Governor General's Awards in Visual and Media Arts.
- 2015 Honorary Doctorate from Emily Carr University of Art and Design
- 2021 Honorary Doctorate of Fine Arts from the University of Victoria

== Collections ==
Metcalfe's work is collected in the following museums, among others:

- Art Gallery of Greater Victoria
- Art Gallery of Nova Scotia
- Art Gallery of Ontario
- Morris and Helen Belkin Art Gallery
- Museum of Modern Art in New York (MoMA) (Collaborative work with Hank Bull)
- National Gallery of Canada
- University of Victoria Legacy Art Gallery
- Vancouver Art Gallery
- West Vancouver Art Museum
