= Yellow Peril: Reconsidered =

Yellow Peril: Reconsidered was a contemporary Asian art exhibition that toured across Canada from September 8, 1990 to July 24, 1991.

Curated by Paul Wong, Yellow Peril: Reconsidered was the third project out of a series of work that focused on "Asians in the New World". The exhibition explored the diverse and multidisciplinary ways in which Asian communities within North America experience and understand heritage, identity, racial politics, gender and sexuality, and globalization.

Twenty-four artists were included in the six city tour, traveling through Montreal, Toronto, Winnipeg, Halifax, Vancouver and Ottawa. The exhibition pieces focuses on new media such as photography, film and video. Often considered as "media of truth" the objective of the photographs, films and videos were to "re-present" history, and using new media as an alternative narrative to popular historical discourse surrounding Asian identity in North America. Yellow Peril: Reconsidered, was the first exhibition that focused on Asian-Canadian identity, and what is considered to be the marginalization of Asian diaspora communities in Canada.

Yellow Peril: Reconsidered included twenty-five artists of Chinese, Japanese, Korean, Filipino, and Vietnamese-Canadian descent: Taki Bluesinger, Melanie Boyle, Anthony Chan, Benjamin Chou, Richard Fung, Jay Hirabayashi, Roy Kiyooka, Nobuo Kubota, L'Amitie Chinoise de Montreal, Laiwan, Daisy Lee, Helen Lee, Brenda Joy Lem, Lui/Samwald, Chi Chung Mak, Nhan Nguyen, Marlin Oliveros, Midi Onodera, Chick Rice, Rubly Truly, Henry Tsang, Tamio Wakayama, Jim Wong-Chu, Jin-me Yoon, and Saryn Yuen.

The curator, Paul Wong, is a Canadian multimedia artist and curator. Wong is known for his engagement with issues surrounding race, gender, and sexuality.
