= Joan Balzar =

Canadian painter (1928–2016)

- Born: Wilma Joan King; November 8, 1928; Vancouver, British Columbia, Canada
- Died: January 16, 2016 (aged 87); North Vancouver, British Columbia, Canada
- Education: Vancouver School of Art
- Known for: abstract painter
- Spouse(s): Roman Balzar (m. 1950); Alexander Cotter

Joan Balzar (November 8, 1928 – January 16, 2016) was a Canadian artist, known for her vividly coloured hard-edged abstract paintings, which sometimes included metallic powders or neon tubing.

== Biography ==
Joan Balzar was born Wilma Joan King in Vancouver, British Columbia and raised in Victoria by parents Wilfred and Mae King. She was married in 1950 to Roman Balzar, an engineer; the marriage lasted for 22 years, and she continued to be known professionally as Joan Balzar throughout her life. Through her husband, Balzar became interested in science, structures, and technology, and gained easy access to the many industrial materials, such as metallic powders, that made their way into her painting techniques. She married a second time, to Alexander Cotter, taking his name but not using it professionally.

Balzar also taught at a time when almost all post-secondary art teaching in British Columbia was done by men, including at the University of British Columbia, Douglas College, the Vancouver School of Art, and the Vancouver Art Gallery.

A large number of her works and almost all her documentation was lost in a West Vancouver home and studio fire in 1970.

Joan Balzar died on January 16, 2016, in North Vancouver.

== Artistic career ==
Balzar studied commercial art briefly at the Broadway Edison School in Seattle, Washington. She graduated with honours from the Vancouver School of Art in 1958, where she studied with Jack Shadbolt, Joseph Plaskett, Don Jarvis, and Peter Aspell. After graduation, she attended the Painter's Workshop Summer Session provided by the UBC Extension Department. She also studied in Paris, Guatemala, and Mexico.

Balzar travelled extensively through the 1950s and 60s, including throughout the United States, Singapore, Italy, and France. Around 1960, she switched her formally abstract expressionist method to her signature grand scale, high intensity, hard-edge style that reconsidered and contextualized the role of space in art. She explains, "[E]arly in my career I was always involved in scientific discussions, I loved to fly and was obsessed with the idea of space and 'the spatial', as well as being attracted to light and the idea of creating light in my art - not just by the addition of neon tubes, but in the paint itself." Balzar experimented with gold leaf, and infusing metallic powders into both the gesso of her underpainting and in the pigments themselves to create reflective, luminescent works that invited people into her 'volumes of light'. To further emphasize the radiant quality of her paintings, she, like many other hard-edge painters, also used up to five layers of white undercoat, repeatedly sanded smooth, as a base to her acrylic colours.

Balzar's use of neon and giant letters, especially the letters X and W, are considered her most powerful and distinctive contributions to the language of painting. Although many scholars today regard Balzar's work as cutting edge and comparable to such celebrated West Coast artists as Michael Morris, Roy Kiyooka, and Iain Baxter, she struggled to gain the same attention in the 1960s art world that didn't take women artists seriously as their male contemporaries. Balzar developed a lifelong friendship with artist Audrey Capel Doray, who also experienced the same industry sexism.

== Exhibitions ==
Joan Balzar has been accorded retrospectives at the Belkin Satellite in 2003, the West Vancouver Museum in 2009, and Simon Fraser University Gallery in 2011, for which an exhibition catalogue Joan Balzar: Vancouver Orbital was published.

When she was traveling in Guatemala, she was commissioned to paint in Tikal, and held a solo exhibition at the Biblioteca Nacional, in 1959; the exhibition was reviewed in several local papers, including Diario de Centro America, and Prensa Libre.

Joan Balzar also exhibited in solo and group exhibitions at commercial galleries, including the New Design Gallery, Bau-Xi Gallery, and Elliott Louis Gallery, and public galleries and groups including the Vancouver Art Gallery, the Morris and Helen Belkin Art Gallery, the West Vancouver Museum, the Art Gallery of Greater Victoria, the Seattle Art Museum, and the Federation of Canadian Artists.

Balzar's work Perimeter was one of more than 160 works included in the Seattle Art Museum's Northwest Artists 53rd Annual exhibition at the Seattle Art Museum Pavilion in 1967, and one of five artists awarded a purchase prize; Perimeter is now included in the permanent collection at the Seattle Art Museum.

Her painting Yellow X was included in Focus '69 at the Bau-Xi Gallery, and was recognized by critic Charlotte Townsend-Gault as "one of the best pieces in the show", and by critic Joan Lowndes as "the smasher of the show". Yellow X was later borrowed by the Vancouver Art Gallery for their exhibition "Vancouver 1965-75" in 1995, and was subsequently purchased for the Gallery's permanent collection in 1996; it was exhibited again in PAINT, and reproduced in the catalogue Paint: A Psychedelic Primer.

Her work was included in Idyll at the Morris and Helen Belkin Art Gallery in 2008, and she participated in an artist talk with Audrey Capel Doray, moderated by artist and curator Lorna Brown.

== Collections ==
Joan Balzar's work is found in numerous public and private collections in Canada and in the United States, including the Vancouver Art Gallery, the University of Alberta, Simon Fraser University, the Art Gallery of Greater Victoria, the Toronto Dominion Bank, the Morris and Helen Belkin Art Gallery at the University of British Columbia, the West Vancouver Museum and the Seattle Art Museum, as well as the Antigua Museum in Guatemala.

== Bibliography ==
- Jeffries, Bill. Joan Balzar: Vancouver Orbital. Burnaby: Simon Fraser University Gallery, 2011. ISBN 978-0-9868581-0-9
- Szewczyk, Monika, et al. Paint: A Psychedelic Primer. Vancouver: Vancouver Art Gallery, 2006. ISBN 978-1895442618
