= Michael de Courcy (artist) =

Canadian artist

- Born: August 3, 1944 (age 82); Montreal, Quebec, Canada
- Education: Ecole des beaux-arts de Montreal; Vancouver School of Decorative and Applied Arts
- Known for: Photography and printmaking
- Website: michaeldecourcy.com

Michael de Courcy (born August 3, 1944) is a Canadian multi-disciplinary artist.

== Biography ==
Michael de Courcy was born in Montreal, Quebec. He completed his formal education at Ecole des beaux-arts de Montreal and Vancouver School of Decorative and Applied Arts (1970). He lives and works in Vancouver, British Columbia.

== Career ==
In the late 1960s de Courcy joined the Intermedia Society, an artist collective active in Vancouver, British Columbia from 1967 to 1972. He was one of its core members, creating an extensive, photo-based project that evolved into The Intermedia Catalogue.

His work has been exhibited in Canada and internationally including the Museum of Modern Art, NYC, the Canadian Museum of Contemporary Photography, Ottawa and the Vancouver Art Gallery. He has lectured and participated in workshops at the University of British Columbia, Emily Carr University of Art and Design, the York University, the University of Windsor, and the School of the Art Institute of Chicago.

=== Significant works ===
de Courcy's 100 randomly stacked photo-boxes Untitled (1970), was presented in the Museum of Modern Art's Photography into Sculpture (1970) exhibition. He was one of two Canadians out of 23 artists who participated in the exhibition. In Mary Statzer's book "Conversation with the Curator, Peter Bunnell said, "...Michael's whole point was that the placement was random. Those boxes had a different image on each side. One fellow liked the black image, so he stacked the boxes so that that one was facing out." de Courcy's Boxes were part of the Photography into Sculpture international traveling exhibition. The exhibition was a traveling exhibition from 1970 to 1972, traveling to Vancouver Art Gallery in 1971. Photography into Sculpture also traveled to the Krannert Art Museum, the Menil Collection, the Virginia Museum of Fine Arts, the San Francisco Museum of Modern Art, the Otis College of Art and Design in LA, the Fort Worth Museum of Modern Art, and the Phoenix Art Museum.

In 1972 de Courcy, Taki Bluesinger, Gerry Gilbert and Glenn Lewis created a photo-mapping project, Background / Vancouver. There were three walking loops through Greater Vancouver, which began and ended at Victoria Square. The walks took place simultaneously and included New Westminster, North Vancouver, Burnaby and West Vancouver. The resulting photographs numbered 360 creating a 360-degree city view.

In 1975 de Courcy along with two assistants painted arrows on the streets in Vancouver marking three walks downtown from the Artist's Gallery to downtown to the West End, to Victory Square and to False Creek in preparation for the Urban Wilderness exhibition.

=== Collections ===
Works by de Courcy are held in the collections of the Vancouver Art Gallery, the National Gallery of Canada, Simon Fraser University Galleries and the Burnaby Art Gallery.
