= Sylvia Spring =

Canadian writer, filmmaker and activist (1942–2026)

Sylvia Belle Spring (July 14, 1942 – September 1, 2026) was a Canadian feminist writer, filmmaker and activist. In 1970, she made Madeleine Is ..., the first Canadian English-language feature film directed by a woman. She was a member of the Canadian task force on Sex-Role Stereotyping in the Broadcast Media established in 1979, a founder of MediaWatch Canada and subsequently its National Director, and presented internationally at forums on the portrayal of women in advertising. In 2005, she was named in the Top 100 list of Canada's Most Powerful Women, in the Trailblazers and Trendsetters category.

== Early life ==
Sylvia Belle Spring was born in Galt, Ontario on July 14, 1942, the second of three children to Daniel Ronald Spring and Shanna Shapiro. She gained a BA(Hons) at the State University of New York, Buffalo, majoring in English literature and drama.

== Career ==
After graduating, Spring wrote poetry and worked in advertising, journalism, radio and television. She conducted radio interviews of the Canadian poet Irving Layton, directed This Land is People, a TV series introducing viewers to up-and-coming Canadians from all walks of life, including Peter Lougheed, Sinclair Stevens and Gustavo da Roza, and co-directed with David Rimmer Know Place, an experimental short documentary about an alternative school.

=== Madeleine Is ... ===
In 1969, Spring received a $15,000 grant from the Canadian Film Development Corporation, to produce a feature-length film in Canada. She co-wrote and directed the resulting 90 minute film, Madeleine Is ... (1971), a segment of which, released as a short feature under the name Madeleine, won an award at the Vancouver International Film Festival in 1970. With a total budget of $100,000, the film was filmed in Vancouver, and starred Vancouver actress Nicola Lipman in the eponymous role of a young aspiring painter from Quebec who moves to Vancouver, where she is involved in an abusive relationship with a political radical and an unfulfilling relationship with a businessman/nerd, before discovering her own identity as an artist. It premiered in April 1971 in Toronto and Montreal, and in May 1971 in Vancouver, but closed in Toronto after just one week. While the film was feted as the "First movie by woman film-maker" (in fact it was the first since Nell Shipman in 1919), reviews were mixed. One reviewer stated that Spring "introduces a character or sets up a mood then doesn't sustain or develop it. The result is a picture of little artistic or entertainment merit, relying on a lot of clichéd outdoor shots to pad a slight story and thin characterisations." When shown at the Edinburgh Festival three years later, a reviewer felt that it "[won] its place merely by a cry of .... militant feminism". On the other hand, one reviewer recognised "the political and psychological naivety, which at times is downright embarrassing" but found that "Nevertheless, the film was better than the response it got. ... Spring's film achieves something fairly difficult: it takes people of five varying social types .... and never once treats them as stereotypes or without generosity. .... There's a straightforward warmth to this film, and it seems to come from its direction". Another reviewer considered the film "over-condemned", with "tender silly scene[s], amusing and touching"; "by the end of the delightful film I only wished that Spring hadn't bitten off so much for this first feature."

From the early 2000s, critics brought a new perspective to Madeleine Is ..., with one stating that "Spring's film has a few very powerful moments ... and some strikingly expressionistic shots of downtown Vancouver. But regardless of its uneven technical and artistic quality, I would argue that the indifference from which the film has suffered results mainly from two factors: its politics and its style." Another believes that it "should also be recognized as one of the best documents of Vancouver in the history of fiction film, unusually sophisticated in dealing with urban issues as pertinent today as they were in the 1970s."

=== Advocacy on Sex-Role Stereotyping in Advertising ===
In 1979, Spring was appointed to a task force on Sex-Role Stereotyping in the Broadcast Media, established by the Canadian minister responsible for the status of women. The purpose of the task force was "to draw up guidelines for a more positive and realistic portrayal of women in radio and television, and to make policy recommendations for consideration by the CRTC and the broadcast industry." Following the decision of the task force that the broadcast industry should voluntarily apply self-created guidelines for a two-year trial period, Spring and two others founded, and Spring was National Director of, MediaWatch Canada, a national lobby group intended to educate the public, facilitate public complaints about the portrayal of women, monitor television and radio broadcasting and advertising, and lobby the federal government. After evaluating industry voluntary self-regulation, the CRTC instituted a policy on sex-role stereotyping in broadcasting in 1986. The Canadian experience was influential in policy development in other countries: Spring presented in 1988 in Australia at a public forum on the portrayal of women in advertising, during which she was interviewed by New Zealand media.

In 1994, Spring led a workshop at the Women Empowering Communication conference in Bangkok, Thailand, at which a plan to monitor media worldwide on a single day was conceived; the first Global Media Monitoring Project occurred in 1995, with 71 countries participating. At the 1995 UNESCO International Symposium Women and the Media: Access to Expression and Decision-Making, she was a member of the Canadian Organizing Committee, the Drafting Committee, and co-presented on 'Overview of Common Obstacles and Strategies to Expression in all Regions'. Spring worked as a Communications Consultant for the Canadian National Association of Women and the Law (NAWL), and in January 2000, travelled to China to conduct workshops on the information dissemination techniques used by women's groups in Canada."

=== Film-making companies ===
By late 1973, Spring was a member of feminist film-making company, Fromunder Films, which was organized to produce films and television programs exclusively about women. She later founded Making Waves Productions. In 1995, she produced Voices and Visions, a documentary series from the UN World Conference on Women held in Beijing, China. In 1996, she produced Breaking the Silence: Stories from AIDS Activists in Southern Africa, which won two awards at the Ottawa Reel Awards in 1996. For the year 2000, Spring had hoped to make a 13-part series on Canadian women, but without funding or TV network interest, instead developed a one hour "docudramady", 20th Century Gals (According to Babe), which explored the women's movement of the 20th century. In 2005, Spring co-produced Our bodies...their battleground, a documentary about the sexual violence crisis facing women and girls in the Democratic Republic of Congo and Liberia. It was shown at the inaugural United Nations Documentary Film Festival, and was "the only film to receive a unanimous top vote by all judges".

== Personal life and death ==
Spring later lived in Wakefield, Quebec, with her partner of 30 years, Canadian diplomat Carolyn McAskie.

Spring died on September 1, 2026, at the age of 84.

== Filmography ==
- 1966–67 This Land is People (director)
- 1967 Hippies and Housing (director; writer; TV)
- 1968 Know Place (co-director with David Rimmer; writer)
- 1971 Madeleine Is… (director; writer)
- 1972 Weekday series (director; TV)
- 1973 Nightmusic (director; TV) – a program about music and communication
- 1973 Point of View Dog (director; writer; producer)
- 1975 Some of My Best Friends Are Men series (director; TV, four episodes)
- 1977 Women and the Law (director; writer; producer)
- 1989 Something in Common: Children of Other Lands series (director; writer)
- 1995 Voices and Visions series (producer; TV)
- 1996 Breaking the Silence: Stories from AIDS Activists in Southern Africa (producer)
- 1998 Making Waves: Canadian Women Evolving Through the 20th Century (writer; executive producer)
- 2001 20th Century Gals (According to Babe)
- 2005 Our bodies...their battleground (co-producer with Nicky Chalk, for the Integrated Regional Information Network (IRIN))

== Awards ==
- 1969 – Canadian Film Development Corporation $15,000 grant
- 1970 – Vancouver International Film Festival Award of Merit for Madeleine (a short feature which forms part of Madeleine Is ...)
- 2005 – Top 100 list of Canada's Most Powerful Women, in the Trailblazers category.
- 2005 – Best Feature for documentaries over 15 minutes, United Nations Documentary Film Festival, for Our bodies...their battleground
