= Salar Mameni =

Canadian artist

- Education: Emily Carr University of Art and Design (BFA); University of British Columbia (MA); University of California, San Diego (PhD)
- Occupation: Artist

Salar Mameni is an associate professor in the Department of Ethnic Studies at University of California, Berkeley.

== Education ==
Mameni completed a Bachelor of Fine Arts in Visual Arts from Emily Carr University of Art and Design, a Master of Arts from the University of British Columbia, and a PhD in Art History from the University of California, San Diego.

== Career ==
Mameni was an education coordinator at the Vancouver Art Gallery, a postdoctoral fellow at the University of California, Santa Cruz, and the Director of the Aesthetics and Politics MA program at the California Institute for the Arts. Mameni has written for Canadian Art, Fuse Magazine, Filip Review, Signs, Journal of Women and Performance, and more. In June 2011, Mameni curated the exhibition, Snail Fever, at the Third Line Gallery in Dubai. Mameni also has an interdisciplinary art practice that includes sound installation, drawing, and creative and scholarly writing. Mameni's artworks are in permanent collections at the Morris and Helen Belkin Art Gallery and the Vancouver Art Gallery.

== Select bibliography ==
=== Writing ===
- "Adventures in History: Isabelle Pauwels at the Henry Art Gallery", Canadian Art, 2010.
- "Dermopolitics: Erotics of the Muslim Body in Pain", Women & Performance: A Journal of Feminist Theory, 2017.
- "Car Flirting and Morality Cruising: Neurotic Gazes and Paranoid Glances in Contemporary Iranian Art", AL- Raida, 2013.
- "Congo memories", Canadian Art, 2010.
- "How Does It Feel to Be an Oil Spill?", Resilience: A Journal of the Environmental Humanities, 2020.
- "Invasion of the Cybernetic Hand and Other Predicaments: Kristen Lucas at Or Gallery", Fillip Review, 2007.
- "On Persian Blues : Queer Bodies, Racial Affects", eScholarship, University of California, 2015.
- "Take Two", Canadian Art, 2009.
- "Visual studies now. Visions of immunity", Visual studies (Abingdon, England), 2021.
- "What Are the Iranians Wishing For? Queer Transnational Solidarity in Revolutionary Iran", Signs: Journal of Women in Culture and Society, 2018.

=== Exhibitions ===
- Again and Again and Again: Serial Formats and Repetitive Actions, Vancouver Art Gallery, 2012.
- Everything Should be As Simple As Possible But Not Simpler, Western Front, 2008.
- Between Us: Toronto/Vancouver Exchange, YYZ Artists' Outlet, 2008.
- White Noise: Sara Mameni and Isabelle Pauwels, State Gallery, 2005.
- The Poster Project, Artspeak, 2004.

== Awards ==
In 2009, Mameni was awarded the Canadian Art Foundation Writing Prize for their account of artist Denise Oleksijczuks' creation of the film Role. Mameni has received grants from Canada Council for the Arts and the Mary Lily Research Grant.
