= Audrey Capel Doray =

Canadian artist (1931–2025)

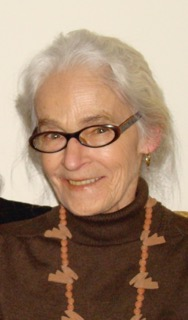
- Audrey Capel Doray
- Born: 1931; Montreal, Quebec
- Died: April 10, 2025 (aged 93–94); Salmon Arm, British Columbia, Canada
- Education: McGill University (1948–1952), Atelier 17; Central School of Arts & Crafts
- Known for: Electronic sculptor, filmmaker, painter, graphic artist, installation artist
- Spouse: Victor Doray

Audrey Capel Doray (1931 – April 11, 2025) was a Canadian artist working in a variety of mediums—painting, printmaking, electronic art, murals, and films. In addition to her solo and group exhibitions, her work was exhibited at the 6th Biennial Exhibition of Canadian Painting at the National Gallery of Canada in 1965. A serigraph Diamond is held in the Tate Gallery London and the National Gallery of Canada. Her work is described in North American Women Artists of the Twentieth Century as combining "robust social criticism with her own interpretation of humanist theory" and dealing with pop art and the feminist archetype, themes of "perpetual motion and endless transition," and the interplay of sound and light.

== Life and career ==
Born Audrey Capel in Montreal, she studied art from the age of 15 in the classes at the Montreal Museum of Fine Arts with Arthur Lismer. She then continued in fine arts at McGill University in Montreal with Lismer, as well as John Goodwin Lyman and Gordon Webber. After graduating from McGill in 1952, she taught art in Montreal schools and completed further work with Jacques de Tonnancour. In 1956, she spent a year in Europe, studying etching at Atelier 17 in Paris with Stanley Hayter. His book New Ways Of Gravure introduced Doray to the art of printmaking. She also studied lithography at the Central School of Arts & Crafts in London.

In 1956, she married the artist and medical illustrator Victor Doray. On their return from Europe they settled in Vancouver where Audrey taught for two years at the Vancouver School of Art. She held her first solo show at the Vancouver Art Gallery in 1961. She also exhibited in 1964 at the New Design Gallery, the first gallery to show contemporary art in Vancouver, which adjoined an arts space that presented live theatre, films, concerts, lectures, and poetry readings.

The earliest local artist to attempt to make Mcluanesqhue paintings was Audrey Capel Doray whose last series on canvas 1965, before she turned to sound, motion and light, was about the transformation of Typographic Man into Electronic Man. Capel Doray went on to produce some of the most emblematic work of the period involving light, sound and motion before returning to painting in the seventies.

Audrey and Victor Doray were instrumental in founding the Intermedia Society in 1967. Inspired in part by the ideas of Marshall McLuhan, it was a place for artists from multiple disciplines to meet and collaborate and was supported partly by grants from the Canada Council. Intermedia remained an influential force in the artistic life of Vancouver for the next decade. Among the initiatives it spawned were the Video Inn (a repository and exchange of video art) and the Western Front Society. The 2008 exhibition Idyll at the Morris and Helen Belkin Art Gallery, featured Doray's multimedia works from this period, with the catalog describing her as "a pioneer of interactive and multimedia art that incorporated computers."

Following her solo shows at the Vancouver Art Gallery at the New Design Gallery, she showed at Simon Fraser University in 1966, the Bau-Xi Gallery in Vancouver, and at the Jerrold Morris Gallery in Toronto. Her work was also exhibited in the 6th Biennial Exhibition of Canadian Painting at the National Gallery of Canada in 1965. By the late 1960s, Doray became known for her transparent plastic kinetic-audio-light sculptures exhibited both in Canada and the United States. She related these multi-sensory haptic-like works to art educator Viktor Lowenfield's teaching of perception by touch in his book, Creative and Mental Growth.

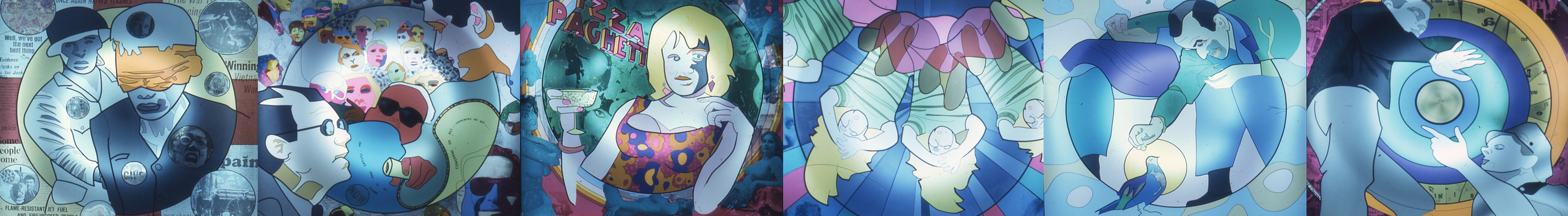
Hexagon—six-panel multi-media installation (detail)

Art in America featured Audrey's Hexagon. This is a six-panelled polarized light kinetic audio installation that they considered inherent in the electronic medium. An interview with her in Vanguard in 1978, set against her solo exhibition that year at the Bau-Xi Gallery, discussed her work in murals, animated film, electronic art and the themes of motion and continual flux in her paintings.

The Doray's established a summer retreat on Savary Island, and Audrey became increasingly drawn to landscape painting and environmental issues. By the 1980s, she and her husband were both active in campaigns to save the old growth forests of Canada's West Coast and participated in art projects for the Stein, Carmanah and Tsitika valleys. In 2014, she was one of the artists shown at the West Vancouver Museum in the exhibition The And of the Land: Perspectives on Landscape by Artists from British Columbia.

Doray's work is in the permanent collections of the National Gallery of Canada in Ottawa, the Vancouver Art Gallery, the Morris and Helen Belkin Art Gallery in Vancouver, and the Confederation Centre Art Gallery in Prince Edward Island. Her serigraph Diamond is held in the Tate Gallery London and the National Gallery of Canada. Her work is also held in several private and corporate collections, including an electronic mural commissioned by Mazda Motors in 1973 and paintings commissioned by the Waterfront Centre Hotel in Vancouver in 1991. Continuing her lifelong interest in interactivity and movement her most recent work is a multi-media installation titled Here and Beyond exhibited at the Macaulay & Co. gallery in 2014 with a score by David Hykes.

Doray died on April 10, 2025, at the age of 93–94.
