= Storm Bay (British Columbia) =

Bay in British Columbia, Canada

Coordinates: 49.662°N 123.822°W

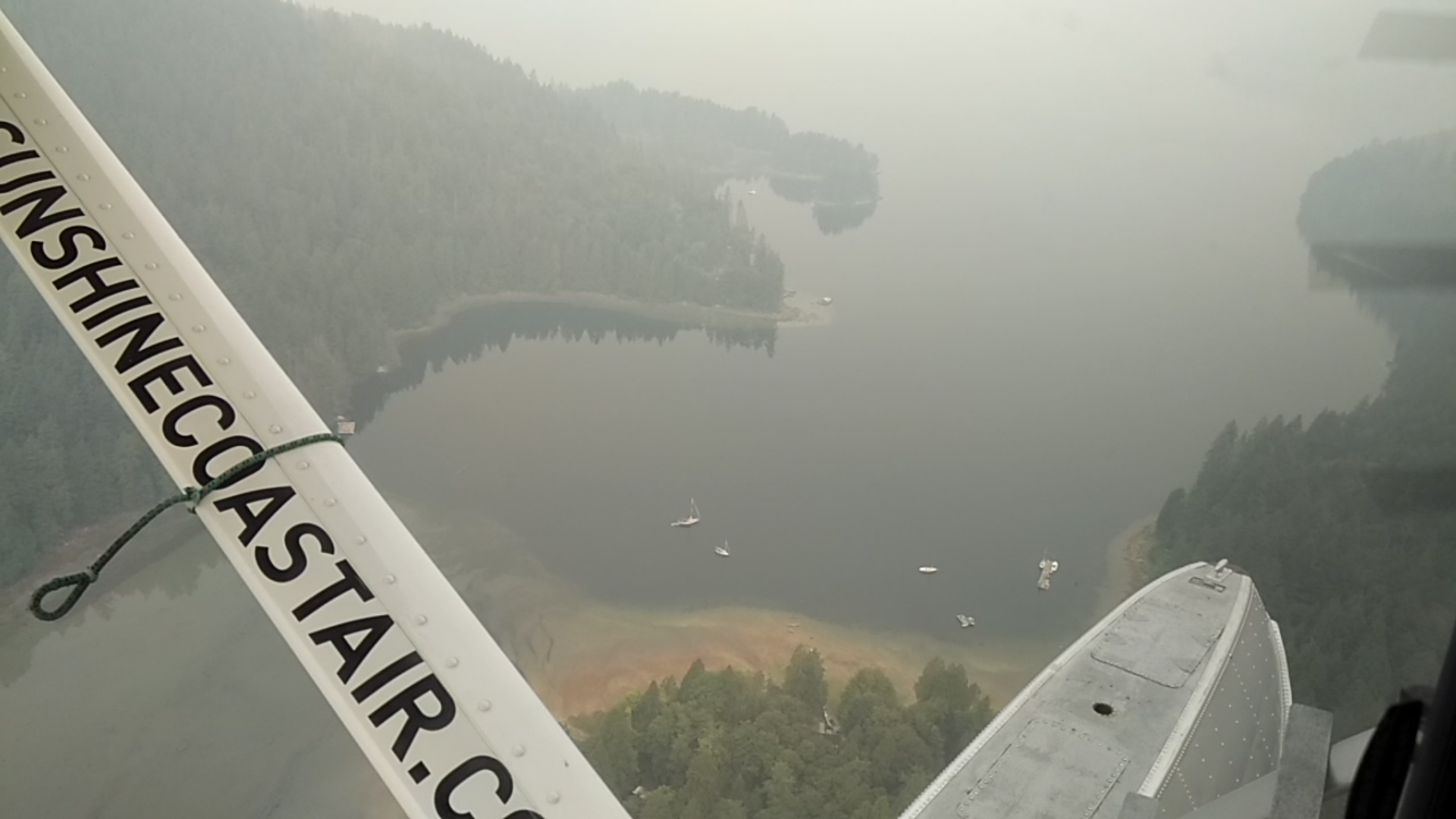
Storm Bay through a smoky haze

Storm Bay is found in the Sechelt Inlet of the Pacific Ocean, near the mouth of Narrows Inlet.

It is accessible by boat or seaplane.

Since the mid-1960s, the location has been home to a number of notable artists.

== Ecology ==
Storm Bay is in the Coastal Douglas-fir Biogeoclimactic Zone of British Columbia, which consists of wet, mossy, dense temperate rain forests.

== History ==
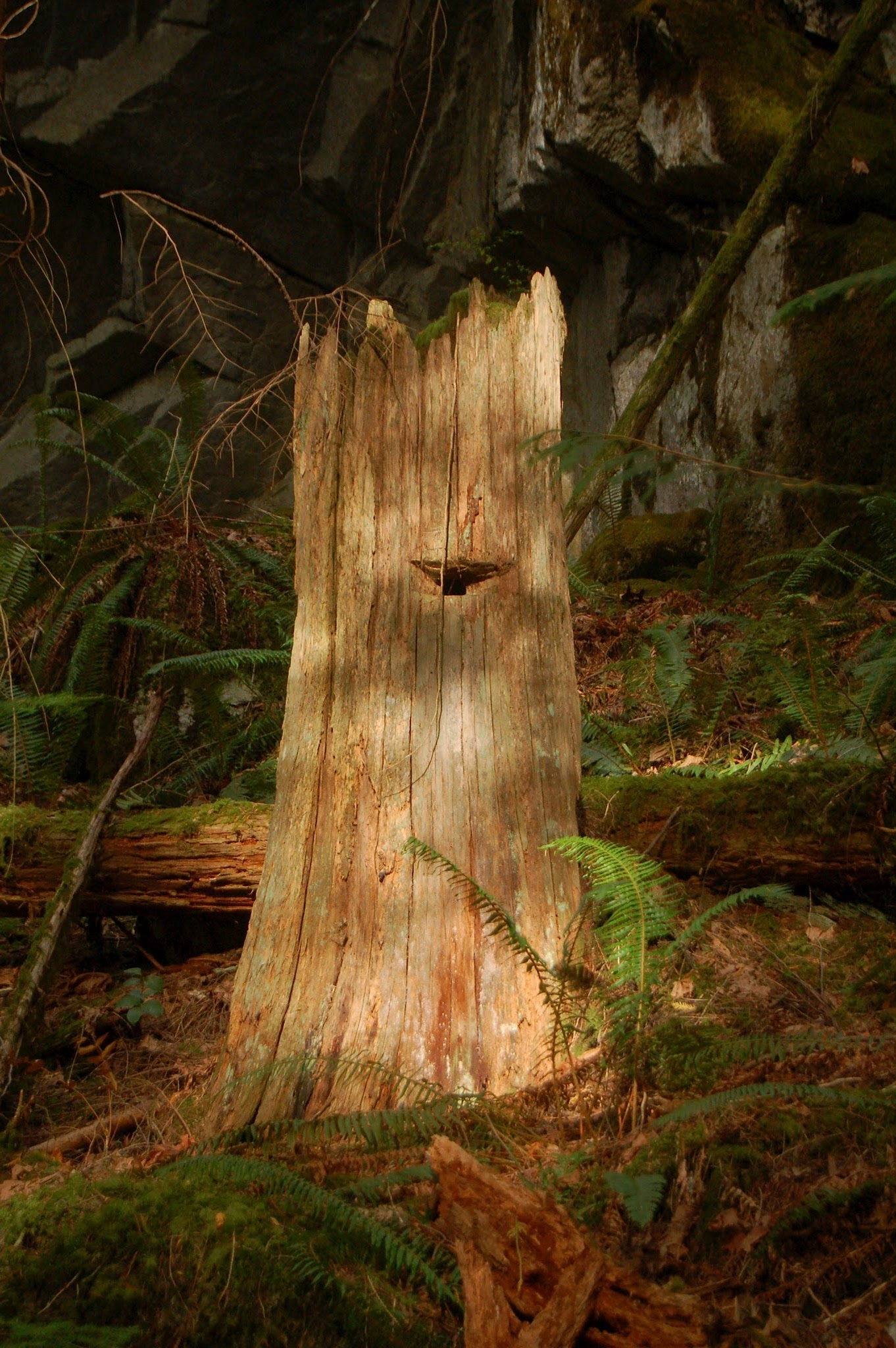
Logged Western redcedar with a springboard notch

Homesteader

=== shíshálh nation ===
Storm Bay has been inhabited by the shíshálh (or Sechelt) nation, specifically the téwánkw sub-group of ?álhtulich, stl'ixwim, and skúpa (Sechelt, Narrows, and Salmon Inlets), for around eight millennia. Existing shell middens indicate ancient and long-term human habitation.

=== Early twentieth century ===
Storm Bay was logged intensively and homesteaded early in the twentieth century.

In 1907, the Sechelt Brick & Tile Company Limited built a small brickworks in Storm Bay which closed after two years due to the poor quality of the clay. The Canadian government built a large brick plant in 1921 as a "returned men's project"; it too was short-lived.

=== 1960s and 1970s to present day ===
Many people loosely associated with the intentional community movement settled in Storm Bay during the late 1960s and early 1970s, including the notable artists Kate Craig (who died in Storm Bay in 2002,) David Rimmer, Karen Jamieson, Hank Bull, and Glenn Lewis.

In 1980 a Royal Canadian Mounted Police member from the Sechelt detachment could name only Storm Bay when asked about extant communes in the Sunshine Coast region. Its inhabitants however eschew the word commune, and refer to Storm Bay as a neighbourhood.

== See also ==
Salish Sea
Skookumchuck Narrows
