= Hank Bull =

Canadian artist (born 1949)

Hank Bull (born 1949) is a Canadian multidisciplinary artist, organizer, and musician based out of Vancouver, BC.

== Life and work ==
Hank Bull was born in Calgary, Alberta. He was raised in Ontario and Nova Scotia. He spent a formative year in Europe in 1968, visiting art museums. He studied at the New School of Art, Toronto, under Nobuo Kubota and Robert Markle.

In 1973, Bull moved to Vancouver, where he joined the Western Front Society. There he met Kate Craig, Eric Metcalfe, Glenn Lewis, Martin Bartlett, and Patrick Ready, working with them on radio, shadow theatre, and performance art projects.

In 1980, Bull and Craig made an extended trip to Japan, Indonesia, India, Cameroon, France, Austria, and Croatia (Yugoslavia). They established lasting relationships with artists in these countries.

In the 1980s, Bull joined an international network of artists experimenting with telecommunications technology.

In 1998, Bull co-organized the Jiangnan Project, a series of Vancouver exhibitions on modern and contemporary art from China. This led to the founding of Centre A, the Vancouver International Centre for Contemporary Asian Art. At Centre A, Bull worked with curators Steven Tong, Sadira Rodrigues, Alice Ming Wai Jim, and Makiko Hara to produce over 100 exhibition projects.

He continues to practice painting, photography, video and music.

== Exhibitions ==
Bull's work has been included in the Venice Biennale (1986), Documenta (1987) Ars Electronica (1989), and the Leipzig Medien Biennale (1994).

In 2015, a survey exhibition, Hank Bull: Connexion, was organized by the Confederation Centre Art Gallery in Charlottetown and curated by Joni Low and Pan Wendt. Based on Bull's personal art collection and his archive of props, costumes, videos, books, and correspondence, the exhibition travelled to five public galleries across Canada.

His work is represented by Stephen Bulger, Toronto, and Wil Aballe, Vancouver.

== Collections ==
Bull's work is included in private and public collections, including the National Gallery of Canada, the Museum of Modern Art in New York, the Art Gallery of Nova Scotia, le Musée d'art contemporain de Montréal, the Burnaby Art Gallery, and the Video Data Bank in Chicago.

== Publications ==
- Connexion, Confederation Centre Art Gallery, Charlottetown, 2015.
- Transient Moments: Vancouver & the Performance Photograph, Presentation House Gallery, North Vancouver, 1997.

== Awards ==
In 2014, Bull received an honorary doctorate from the Emily Carr University of Art and Design.

== See also ==
- Storm Bay (British Columbia)
