= Evelyn Roth =

Canadian artist (born 1936

- Born: Evelyn Margaret Yakubow; December 27, 1936 (age 89); Mundare, Alberta, Canada
- Education: self-taught
- Known for: textile artist sculptor, performance artist, dancer interactive fabric artist
- Movement: interdisciplinary art
- Awards: Artist of the Year, awarded by the Vancouver Sun (1973); World of Wearable Art International Design Competition (1999)

Evelyn Roth (born December 27, 1936) is a Canadian born interdisciplinary artist who has worked across the arts in textiles, sculpture, performance, dance and interactive fabric arts. Specialising in environmentally sensitive events, festivals, school programs and art gallery exhibits. Roth is based in the town of Maslin Beach, on South Australia's Fleurieu Peninsula.

== Early life ==
Born Evelyn Margaret Yakubow, in 1936 in Mundare, Alberta Canada. She moved to Edmonton, Alberta in the 1950s where she took classes in art, crafts, modern, eastern and classical dance. She also took yoga and fencing classes while working in the local children's library. In 1961, she and her first husband Klaus Roth moved to Vancouver where she worked in the university library. They later separated in the 1960s.

== Career ==
When she moved to Vancouver in 1961, Evelyn Roth joined Intermedia and became a key practitioner in the international art scene at the time, focusing on art and technology, wearable art and video art. During the 1970s Roth focused her practice on knitting and crocheting with recycled materials including television video tape and natural fibres. She created wearable art, textile installations and furnishings. In 1974, her book about her work, The Evelyn Roth Recycling Book, was published by Talonbooks. That same year, she joined the British Columbia pavilion at Expo '74, presenting under a sunsail made of woven computer tapes and videotape. She often adapted the motif of wearables, fabricating work from found materials and ingeniously using them in various festivals, events or exhibitions.

From 1973 through the 1980s, Roth explored the intersections of sculpture, dance and the environment and formed the Evelyn Roth Moving Sculpture Company. Where the award winning film Woven in Time was created in 1974, featuring Roth's textile work and the company in various outdoor settings. It won an ETROG award (Canadian Film Awards) in 1976. Her work became a catalyst for many creators with a wide variety of interests in different countries.

Her first trip to Australia was in 1979. In 1981, she was invited to install an interactive display at the Adelaide Festival Centre Foyer which she created out of discarded television programs (titled Under the Billabong There Lives A Salmon), then returned to South Australia to work with Pitjitjanjara communities and held workshops in rabbit knit and painted leather garments, as well as crocheting a shade canopy from discarded video tape and play web from nylon. The first showing of Nylon Zoo in Australia was in 1982 at the 1982 Commonwealth Games in Brisbane. In 1990, she set up the Evelyn Roth Celebration Centre – Point Roberts, USA (artist' studios, art gallery and performance space) This large studio allowed her to expand inflatable structures into mazes, set up a FestivalArts website and to promote her work worldwide. In 2003, Evelyn Roth's Wearable Art, 1971 to 2003, was held at the Australian National University, Canberra, Australia. Her work is in the collections of the Vancouver Art Gallery and Surrey Art Gallery, British Columbia.

Roth has lived and worked in Australia since 1996. She has an annual residency with the Storybook Theatre Company in Hawaii.

== Exhibitions/festivals/workshops ==
Roth has been featured in many solo exhibitions over the years and participated in various festivals and group exhibitions. In 2022, Roth did a workshop at the Vancouver Art Gallery titled "The Big Recycle with Evelyn Roth".

== Solo exhibitions ==
- 1976 – Nylon Zoo at Habitat Forum, Vancouver
- 1977 – Salmon Dance (narration by Hannelore) on the Queen Charlotte Islands
- 1981 – Under The Billabong There Lives A Salmon at the Adelaide Festival Centre, South Australia
- September 29 to November 7, 1993 – Salmon Run at the Surrey Art Gallery

== Group exhibitions ==
- October 30, 2015, to January 10, 2016 – Between Object and Action: Transforming Media in the 1960s and 70's at the Vancouver Art Gallery
- October 24, 2015, to February 28, 2016 – Hippie Modernism: The Struggle for Utopia at the Walker Art Center
- January 12 to April 8, 2018 – Beginning with the Seventies: GLUT at the Morris and Helen Belkin Art Gallery, Vancouver, British Columbia

== Awards ==
In 1973, she was awarded Artist of the Year by the Vancouver Sun. In 1999 and 2006, Roth won the World of Wearable Art international design competition in New Zealand.

== Personal life ==
She is married to Australian artist John F. Davis.
