= David Rimmer =

Canadian filmmaker (1942–2023)

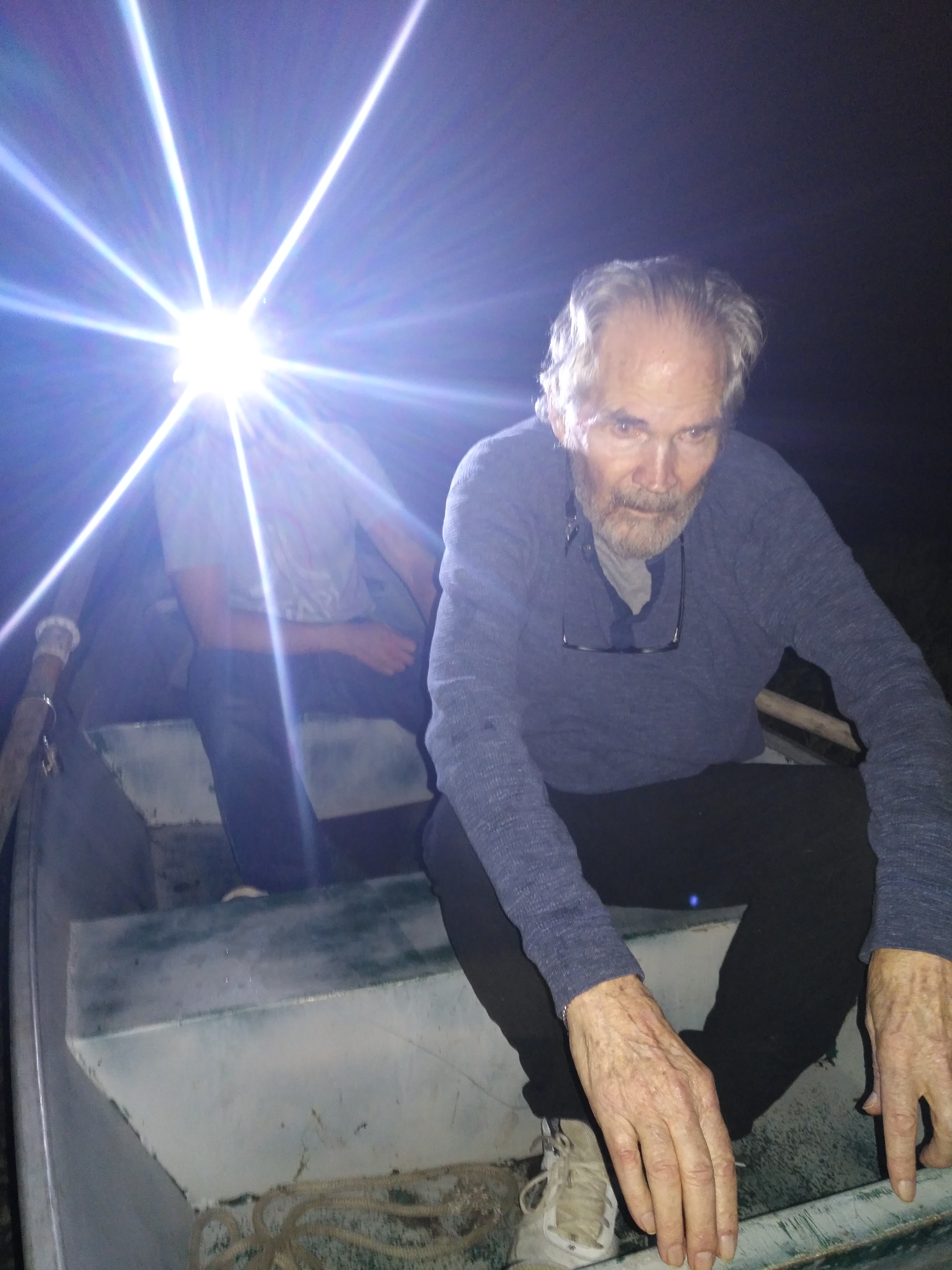
- Rimmer in 2017
- Born: David McLellan Rimmer; 20 January 1942; Vancouver, British Columbia, Canada
- Died: 26 January 2023 (aged 81); Vancouver, British Columbia, Canada
- Occupations: Filmmaker photographer
- Years active: 1967–2023

David Rimmer (20 January 1942 – 26 January 2023) was a Canadian experimental filmmaker and university instructor. His works came to prominence in the Underground Film community in the 1970s. In 2011, he was awarded a Governor General's award for his lifetime achievements in the arts.

== Early life ==
Rimmer was born in Vancouver, British Columbia and studied economics and mathematics at the University of British Columbia (UBC), before graduating in 1963. For the next two years he traveled around the world, which led him to decide that he was not interested in pursuing a career in business. Returning to Canada in 1965, he did a make-up year at the UBC to receive a degree in English. In 1967 he took a short filmmaking course from Stan Fox, a producer at the Canadian Broadcasting Corporation (CBC). Rimmer dropped out of graduate school at Simon Fraser University (SFU) in 1968 to become an artist. With Fox's support and a supply of rough film stock from the CBC, he made his first film, Knowplace, which was broadcast on the CBC. Inspired by Stan Brakhage's films and writings, he made his first important experimental films, Square Inch Field and Migration, in 1968 and 1969 respectively.

== Career ==
Rimmer moved temporarily to New York City from 1971 to 1974, and worked with such vanguard artists as Yvonne Rainer. When he returned to Canada in 1974 he created the two landmark films Canadian Pacific (1974) and Canadian Pacific II (1975). Since 1979, with the release of Al Neil / A Portrait, he has made innovative documentaries sometimes in film and sometimes in video. In the early eighties, Rimmer took a four-year hiatus from filmmaking to teach film and video at SFU. Rimmer has worked extensively with contact and optical printing as well as videographics.

Rimmer died in Vancouver on 27 January 2023.

== Reception and legacy ==
The Canada Council for the Arts described him as “one of the finest technicians of Canada’s avant-garde film movement.”

Gene Youngblood of ArtsCanada magazine has said "Surfacing on the Thames is a brilliant film which, in its way, belongs in the same class as Snow's Wavelength. I've never seen anything like it ... the ultimate metaphysical movie." In 2011 David Rimmer won the Governor General's Award in Visual and Media Arts.

=== Archiving ===
Since 2012, Rimmer's extant film originals have been housed in the collection of the Academy Film Archive in Los Angeles, where many of his works have been preserved and restored.

== Filmography ==
- Knowplace (co-directed with Sylvia Spring and Bob Herbison, 1967)
- Head/End (1967)
- Square Inch Field (1968)
- Migration (1969)
- Landscape (1969)
- Surfacing on the Thames (1970)
- Variations on a Cellophane Wrapper (1970)
- Blue Movie (1970)
- The Dance (1970)
- Forest Industry (Feature length, 1970)
- Treefall (1970)
- Seashore (1971)
- Real Italian Pizza (1971)
- Watching for the Queen (1973)
- Fracture (1973)
- Canadian Pacific (1974)
- Canadian Pacific II (1975)
- Al Neil / A Portrait (1979)
- Narrows Inlet (1980)
- Shades of Red (Co-Directed with Paula Ross, 1982)
- Bricolage (1984)
- Sisyphus (1984)
- Along the Road to Altamira (1986)
- As Seen on TV (1986)
- Roadshow (1988)
- Divine Mannequin (1989)
- Black Cat, White Cat It's a Good Cat if it Catches the Mouse (1989)
- Beaubourg Boogie-Woogie (1992)
- Local Knowledge (1992)
- Perestroyka (1992)
- Tiger (1994)
- Under the Lizards (Feature length, 1994) (a.k.a. Pod Jaszczurami)
- Codes of Conduct (1997)
- Jack Wise – Language of the Brush (1998)
- Traces of Emily Carr (1999)
- Early Hand-Painted (Series of 10 shorts, 2002)
- An Eye for an Eye (2003)
- Gathering Storm (2003)
- On the Road to Kandahar (2003)
- Padayatra: Walking Meditation (2005)
- Digital Psyche (2007)
- Collective (2008)

== See also ==
- Storm Bay (British Columbia)
- Maximalist film
- Minimalist film
