= Skip Triplett =

President of Kwantlen Polytechnic University

Skip Triplett was the president and CEO of Kwantlen Polytechnic University in Vancouver, British Columbia.

== See also ==
- Higher education in British Columbia
