= Judy Radul =

Canadian artist, writer and educator

- Born: 1962 (age 62–63); Lillooet, British Columbia
- Education: Simon Fraser University, Bard College
- Known for: Performance artist, video artist, photographer, installation artist
- Awards: VIVA award (1999)
- Website: http://www.judyradul.com/

Judy Radul (born in 1962 in Lillooet, British Columbia) is a Canadian multidisciplinary artist, writer and educator. She is known for her performance art and media installations, as well as her critical writing.

== Biography ==
She has exhibited her work around the world, and recently participated in the Deutscher Akademischer Austauschdienst program in Berlin. She is currently a professor at Simon Fraser University, in the School for Contemporary Arts and is represented by the Catriona Jeffries Gallery.

She received her BA in 1990 in Fine and Performing Arts from Simon Fraser University, British Columbia, and her M.F.A. in 2000 (Visual and Media Arts) from Bard College, New York.

Her teaching career includes;

- Professor, Simon Fraser University, [?]-present;
- [Faculty/Guest Lecturer], The Banff Centre, 2010
- Assistant Professor, Simon Fraser University, 2000–[?];
- Instructor, Simon Fraser University, 1999–2000;
- Sessional Instructor, Emily Carr Institute of Art and Design, 1994–1999;

Radul's practice since the 1980s includes performance art, creative and critical writing, sound works, photography, film, video and multimedia installations. She has contributed significantly to Canadian art institutions such as the Banff Centre and the Western Front. She has also been closely involved with The Kootenay School of Writing, a Vancouver-based writers' collective.

== Notable exhibitions ==
- Radul's recent work is the World Rehearsal Court. According to the Morris and Helen Belkin Art Gallery website:

World Rehearsal Court is a large-scale installation that draws on Radul’s research into the role of theatricality and new technologies in the court of law. Based on trial transcripts from International Criminal Tribunals, the exhibition presents a series of pre-recorded courtroom scenes, an evidence room, objects, and a series of computer-controlled live cameras that feed to an array of monitors that turns the gallery into a theatrical and cinematic space.

— Morris and Helen Belkin Art Gallery,

The work serves as an example of Radul's long-running interest in art, technology and the law. In explicitly identifying the performative aspects of the courtroom, the World Rehearsal Court questions the objective and immutable truth that the court process purports to uncover.

- Radul also exhibited at the 2014 Berlin Biennale

=== Other selected exhibitions and performances ===
- Catriona Jeffries, Vancouver, 2018.
- Contour Biennale 8, Mechelen, 2017.
- Witte de With Center for Contemporary Art, Rotterdam, 2017
- V-A-C Foundation at the GULAG History State Museum, Moscow, 2017
- Nicaragua Biennale X, 2016.
- Agnes Etherington Art Centre, Kingston, Ontario, 2015.
- 8th Berlin Biennale, 2014.
- Daadgalerie, Berlin, 2013.
- Catriona Jeffries, Vancouver, 2011.
- Seoul Biennale of Media Art, 2010.
- General Foundation, Vienna, 2010.
- Morris and Helen Belkin Gallery, Vancouver, BC, 2009.
- Vancouver Art Gallery, Vancouver BC, 2005.
- Presentation House Gallery, North Vancouver, BC, 2005.
- Kunsthaus Graz, Austria, 2004.
- Canadian Cultural Centre, Paris, 2004.
- Dazibao centre de photographies actuelles, Montreal, 2004.
- Power Plant Contemporary Art Gallery, Toronto, 2003.
- YYZ Gallery, Toronto, 2003.

== Honours ==
- VIVA award (1999), Jack and Doris Shadbolt Foundation for the Visual Arts.
- City of Vancouver Mayor's Arts Award for Visual Arts (2017)
