= Jack Wasserman =

Canadian journalist (1927–1977)

- Born: 27 February 1927; Winnipeg, Manitoba, Canada
- Died: 6 April 1977 (aged 50); Vancouver, British Columbia, Canada
- Occupation: journalist
- Known for: covering Vancouver's seedy nightlife
- Spouse: Fran Gregory

Jack Wasserman (February 27, 1927 – April 6, 1977) was a nightlife and celebrity columnist for the Vancouver Sun newspaper from 1949 until his death. He also had a program on Vancouver talk-radio station CJOR (1968).

== Life ==
Wasserman was born in Winnipeg on February 27, 1927.

His column, read throughout British Columbia, largely comprised short items strung together, with the names of celebrities in boldface. He often reported things he or others overheard backstage or at political rallies. Wasserman would have some inside information on headline stories. Wasserman's interview subjects included Nina Simone, Richard Pryor, Dusty Springfield, Eric Burdon and Tommy Douglas.

When printers at the Vancouver Sun declared a strike, Wasserman, anticipating a long work stoppage, approached his friend Jim Pattison, owner of radio station CJOR, for a job. Wasserman would go on the air with a three-hour talk show weekday mornings from nine until noon. His competition would be radio veteran Jack Webster. The Sun responded by firing Wasserman, and replacing him with Denny Boyd.

Wasserman brought many major celebrities to the show through his connections with local promoters and nightclub owners. His guests included Nina Simone, Richard Pryor, Dusty Springfield, Eric Burdon, and many others, including politicians such as Tommy Douglas. His ratings, however, could not beat Webster's, and in a couple of years Wasserman returned to the Sun and resumed his column, until his death. He briefly had a show named Wasserman's World on CKNW (1970).

Wasserman's society and celebrity columns (and occasional political analysis) covered the often-lurid details of the Vancouver nightlife and society scene in the 1950s and 1960s, when famous dinner clubs such as The Cave and Isy's attracted big names from around the world.

Quoting from one of his columns:

Vancouver erupted as the vaudeville capital of Canada, rivaling and finally outstripping Montreal in the East and San Francisco in the south as one of the few places where the brightest stars of the nightclub era could be glimpsed from behind a post, through a smoke-filled room, over the heads of $20 tippers at ringside. Only in Las Vegas and Miami Beach, in season, were more superstars available in nightclubs.

Wasserman died after collapsing during an event at the Hotel Vancouver on April 6, 1977. Following his death, British Columbia premier Bill Bennett described him as a "very fair member of the media" in a speech to the BC legislature.
