= Gathie Falk =

Canadian artist (1928–2025)

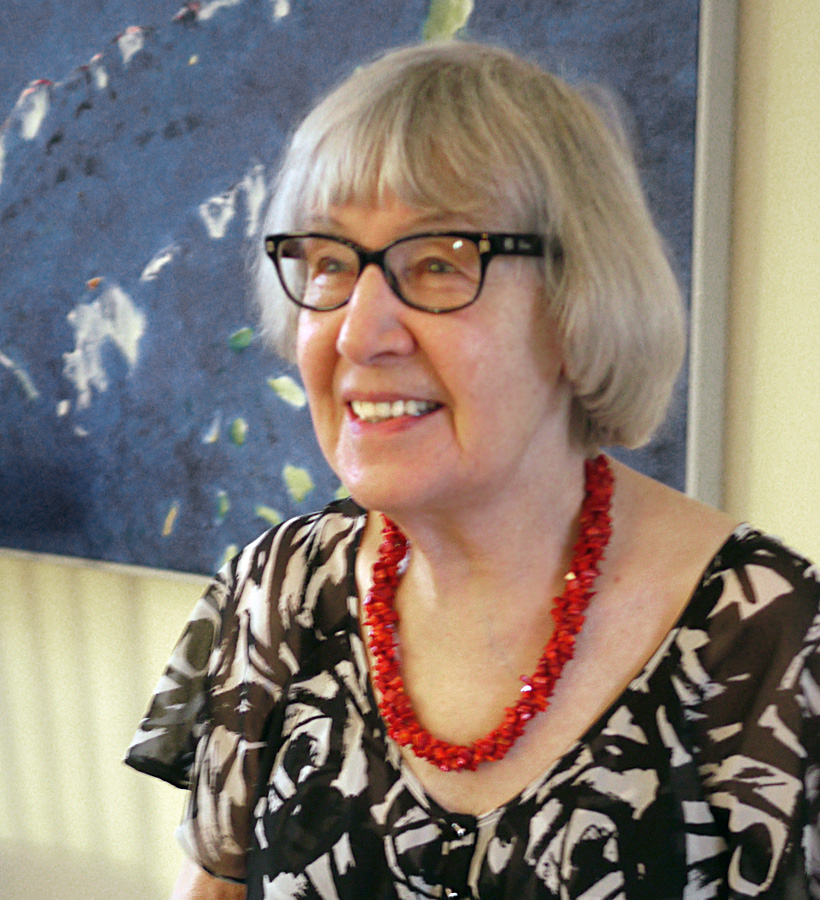
- Falk in 2010
- Born: Agathe Falk; January 31, 1928; Alexander, Manitoba, Canada
- Died: December 22, 2025 (aged 97); Vancouver, British Columbia, Canada
- Occupation: Artist
- Known for: Painter, sculptor, potter
- Awards: Order of Canada; Order of British Columbia

Gathie Falk CM OBC (January 31, 1928 – December 22, 2025) was a Canadian painter, sculptor, and installation and performance artist based in Vancouver, British Columbia. From the 1960s on, she created works that considered the simple beauty of everyday items and daily rituals.

== Life and work ==
Gathie Falk was born in Alexander near Brandon, Manitoba, Canada, to immigrant Russian Mennonite parents. Her father, Cornelius, died that same year and her mother, Agatha, went to work to support her and her older brother Gordon, while her eldest brother, Jack, had to move in with another family. In 1930, the Falk family relocated to another small town in southern Manitoba and continued to move around, eventually ending up in Winnipeg when Falk was a teenager. At 16, she left high school to work so she could assist with the family finances and completed her education via correspondence courses. When she was 19, Falk and her mother moved to Vancouver, where she still resided at the time of her death in late 2025. Her first job in the city was at a luggage factory, where she sewed pockets inside the suitcases. This experience helped her develop her skills in detailed handicraft, which would later become integral to her artistic practice. Falk then became a school teacher in 1953 and taught elementary students until 1965, when she left to commit herself full-time to creating art.

Falk worked in various media, including performance, installation, ceramics, painting, drawingl, and papier-mâche. Her early paintings from the 1950s and 1960s were influenced by German Expressionism. Falk created her first ceramic interpretations of quotidian objects, such as shoes, boots, and a suit coat, while studying ceramics with Glenn Lewis at the University of British Columbia. Her works found their source in the events and objects of everyday life, inviting us to consider the significance of the commonplace, including her well-known ceramic sculpture Fruit Piles (1967–70), Single Right Men's Shoes (1972–73), and Picnics (1976–77). As described by Vancouver Art Gallery senior curator Bruce Grenville,

"Falk is remarkable for her ability to seize the ordinary and turn it into a powerful revelatory force... the paintings and sculptures she produces have a deeply personal presence that is grounded in an intense scrutiny of her daily environment."

Drawing from subjects ranging from apples, oranges and shoes to dogs, dresses, hedges, and clouds, her work was unique.

Between 1968 and 1972, Falk created some fifteen performance artworks, which typically involved undertaking everyday activities, such as eating an egg, putting on makeup, or reading a book.

She participated in group and solo exhibitions in Canada, the United States, France and Japan. A major retrospective show of her work at the Vancouver Art Gallery in 2000 later toured to various Canadian galleries including the National Gallery of Canada. Recent exhibitions of Falk's work include The Things in My Head (2015: Equinox Gallery, Vancouver), and paperworks (2014: Burnaby Art Gallery, Burnaby, British Columbia). More recently, the McMichael Canadian Art Collection, held another retrospective show of her work, which ran from June 2022 to January 2023.

Falk's work can be found in private and public collections including the Vancouver Art Gallery, the Winnipeg Art Gallery, the Musée d'art contemporain de Montréal, the Burnaby Art Gallery, and the National Gallery of Canada.

She was represented by Equinox Gallery in Vancouver, B.C., Canada and by Michael Gibson Gallery in London, Ontario, Canada.

Falk died in Vancouver on December 22, 2025, at the age of 97.

== Grants and awards ==
Falk received many awards including the Gershon Iskowitz Prize (1990), the Order of Canada (1997), the Governor General's Award in Visual and Media Arts (2003) and the Viva Award for Lifetime Achievement (2012). Others were:

- Audain Prize for Lifetime Achievement in the Visual Arts (2013)
- Order of British Columbia (2002)
- Canada Council Senior Grant (1980)
- Canada Council Arts Bursary (1971, 1969, 1968)
- Sun Award (1968)
- Canada Council Short Term Grant (1967)
