= Karen Jamieson =

Canadian dancer, choreographer, and dance teacher

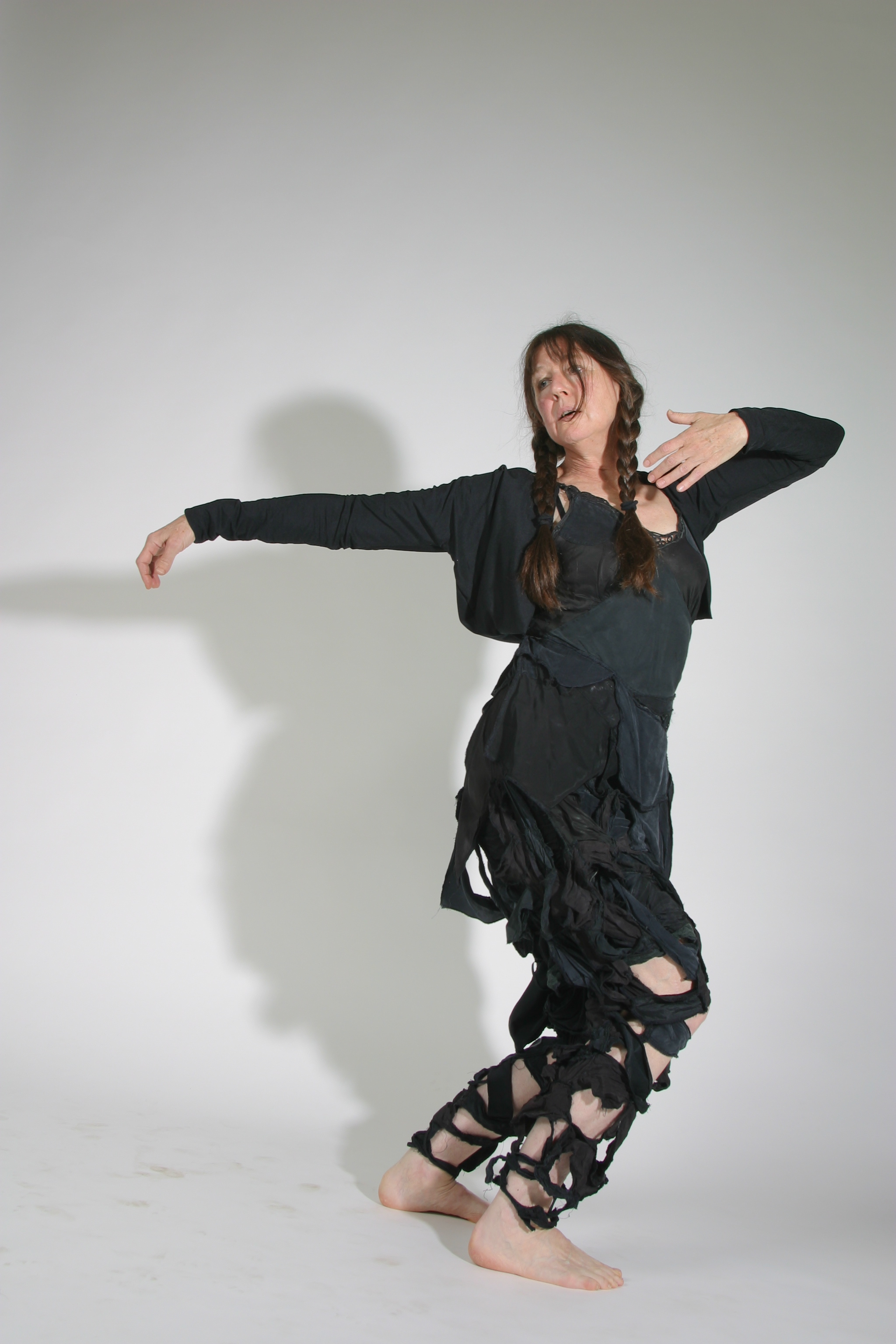
- Jamieson in Crow (2004), photographed by Chris Randle
- Born: July 10, 1946 (age 80); Vancouver, British Columbia, Canada
- Education: Bachelor of Arts; University of British Columbia Dance; Simon Fraser University, independent study in New York

Karen Jamieson (born July 10, 1946) is a Canadian dancer, choreographer, and mentor located in Vancouver, British Columbia, Canada.

She is the founder and artistic director of Karen Jamieson Dance Company, a non-profit contemporary dance company formed in 1983.

Today, Karen Jamieson Dance supports the practice, research, creation, and production of dance with a focus on legacy work, which includes the passing on of dance practices and ideas to emerging generations of artists through body transcription, work with scholars, mentorships, oral history, and archiving. In 2022, Karen Jamieson Dance launched its first oral history and archival research project entitled Coming Out of Chaos: A Vancouver Dance Story, which looks at the impact of Jamieson's 1982 piece, Coming Out of Chaos, on the emergence of contemporary dance in Vancouver from the 1960s to the present day.

As of 2022, Jamieson has created over 100 dance works with original scores by over 20 Canadian composers, and has performed her work in Canada, Europe, Japan, and the United States.

Her work Sisyphus was named one of the 10 Canadian choreographic masterworks of the 20th century by Dance Collection Danse, and multi-year projects with the Haida village of Skidegate B.C. and with the residents of Vancouver's Downtown Eastside are recognized nationally as groundbreaking in the field of community-engaged and cross-cultural dance.

== Education and dance training ==
Jamieson received her Bachelor of Arts degree in Philosophy and Anthropology from the University of British Columbia in 1967. She attended Simon Fraser University to study teaching, but after discovering dance through SFU workshops with Iris Garland, she decided to change directions and pursue a career in dance instead.

In 1970, Jamieson went to New York City where she received significant dance training with major pioneering figures of the time, including Alwin Nikolais, Merce Cunningham and Martha Graham, and ballet training with Alfredo Corvino and Maggie Black. She toured with the Alwin Nikolais Dance Theatre and with Yvonne Rainer.

== Career ==
In 1975, Jamieson returned from New York to Vancouver, where she began teaching at Simon Fraser University. She was a founding member of Terminal City Dance, which originally also consisted of Marion-Lea Dahl, Peggy Florin, Terry Hunter, Menlo MacFarlane, Michael Sawyer, and Savannah Walling.

In 1983, after seven years as a co-founder and director of Terminal City Dance Research, Jamieson established Karen Jamieson Dance Company. The company was located at 901 Main St. and had seven members at the time of its founding: Karen Jamieson, Paulette Bibeau, Alison Crawford, Jay Hirabayashi, Lyne Lanthier, Aaron Shields, and Tom Stroud.

The first piece Jamieson choreographed for Karen Jamieson Dance was a work entitled Sisyphus, which was later named one of Canada's top 10 choreographic masterworks of the 20th century by Dance Collection Danse magazine.

Other works include Solo from Chaos (1982), The Roadshow (1985), Drive (1987), Mudwoman (1990), Passage (1990), Mixk’aax (1991), Oracles of Innocence (1991), and Man Within (1992). Jamieson's focus is on exploring dance as mythic thinking, and creating a cross-cultural dialogue with First Nations artists.

A significant component of Jamieson's work is her commitment to cross-cultural collaboration and community-engaged dance. Notable works in these areas by Jamieson include Passage (1990), Gawa Gyani (1991), The River (1996), Stone Soup (1997), Necessary Encounter (1999), Raven of the Railway (2001), Quest (2003), The Skidegate Project (2002–2005), Percy Gladstone Memorial Dance (2005), Elmer & Coyote (2005), and Collision (2008–2011).

In the 1990s, Jamieson established the Dance In and For the Community Program to engage with non-professional dancers and community members through site-specific work. This program has been developed over several decades and delivered through various projects. It continues to the present day with workshops that engage residents of Vancouver's Downtown Eastside community.

== Awards and honours ==
- 1980 - Jean A. Chalmers Award for Creativity and Excellence in the Arts (Choreography)
- 1994 - 125th Anniversary of B.C. Award for significant contribution to compatriots, community and Canada
- 2013 - Vancouver Mayor's Arts Award for artistic excellence, achievement and contribution to Vancouver's community
- 2016 - Isadora Award for excellence in Choreography and outstanding achievements in British Columbia's dance community
- 2018 - One of the 8 inaugural inductees into the Canadian Dance Hall of Fame - Encore! Dance Hall of Fame - created and supported by Dance Collection Danse

== See also ==
- Storm Bay (British Columbia)
