= Gerry Gilbert =

Canadian poet (1936–2009)

Gerry Gilbert (April 7, 1936 – June 19, 2009) was a Canadian poet known for his rejection all awards and competitions on the basis that personal ambition in art led to a lack of sincerity. He was known as Vancouver's bicycle poet.

== Life ==
Gilbert was born in Calgary in 1936 during a trip between Toronto and Vancouver forcing his parents to stop briefly in Calgary. His art reflects this unique birth as much of its allure is a kind of tension between remaining and continuing. He attended the University of British Columbia before traveling to England and further study there. Gilbert then returned to Vancouver and although he died there he managed to live and travel across Canada and Europe in his younger years.

Gerry became a fixture in the Vancouver art scene and began a periodical anthology of writing that he distributed himself called British Columbia Monthly (later B.C. Monthly) in 1972 placing him among the ranks of Canadian artists participating in the mimeograph revolution. To some he was known as 'the Jude the Obscure of Vancouver poetry'.

Gerry hosted a radio show for many years on CFRO-FM Radio called radiofreerainforest. Gilbert's film and photography have been exhibited by the Vancouver Art Gallery, the Morris and Helen Belkin Art Gallery, the Western Front, and the Contemporary Art Gallery (Vancouver). He was a prolific writer whose work spanned from the early sixties into the beginnings of the 21st century. His largest and most comprehensive work is Moby Jane published by Toronto's Coach House Books in 1987.

He died in Vancouver.

== Bibliography ==
- 1964:White Lunch, Periwinkle Press
- 1969:Phone Book, Weed Flower Press & Ganglia Press
- 1970:Doi,ngng, National Film Board of Canada,
- 1971:And, blewointment press
- Money, Georgia Straight Writing Supplement
- 1972:Lease, Coach House Press
- 1974:Skies, Talon Books
- 1974:Journal to the East, blewointment press
- 1976:Grounds, Talon Books ISBN 0-88922-090-5
- 1977:From Next Spring, Coach House Books
- 1987:Moby Jane, Coach House Press ISBN 1-55245-141-0
- 1988:So Long Song, Gorse Press
- 1989: The 1/2 of It, Wave 7 Press
- 1991:Azure Blues, Talon Books ISBN 0-88922-286-X
- 1994:Year of the Rush, Underwhich Editions ISBN 0-88658-092-7
- 1995:Sex and the Single Mushroom, Letters ISBN 0-921688-07-5
- 1998:Poem Boooooooooooook, above/ground press
- Canadian Answers: Zap Poetry, Laurel Reed Books
- 2006:Perhaps, Bookthug

== See also ==
- Canadian literature
- Canadian poetry
- List of Canadian poets
