= New Era Social Club =

Informal artist society in British Columbia, Canada

The New Era Social Club was an informal society whose members were primarily British Columbian artists, which was formed in the late 1960s and which dissolved in the mid-1970s. The New Era Social Club was not part of any particular art movement. Rather than producing works directly associated with the club, the general intent was to broaden the public's perception of BC artists and the type of works that they produced.

== 2017 Installation ==
Brand New Era Social Club as installed

In 2017, the Brussels-based artist Alex Morrison, was commissioned to create a work of public art. The photographic installation, entitled Brand New Era Social Club, was installed at the Dal Grauer Substation in downtown Vancouver, as part of the 2017 Capture Photography Festival.
