= Michael Morris (artist) =

Canadian artist (1942–2022)

- Born: 16 May 1942; Saltdean, England
- Died: 18 November 2022 (aged 80); Victoria, British Columbia, Canada
- Education: University of Victoria, BC; the Vancouver School of Art; Slade School of Art, England
- Awards: Morris was awarded an Honorary Doctorate of Humanities by Emily Carr University of Art + Design (2005); the Governor General's Award in Visual and Media Arts (2011); Audain Prize for Lifetime Achievement in the Visual Arts (2015)

Michael Morris D.F.A. (16 May 1942 – 18 November 2022) was a British-born Canadian visual artist, archivist, educator, and curator. Morris has also completed successful works in film, photography, video, installation, correspondence art, and performance.

== Life and career ==
Morris was born in Saltdean, England on 16 May 1942. He came to Canada when he was four years old and grew up in Saanich, British Columbia. As a child, Morris was influenced by Herbert Siebner, who arrived in Victoria, BC from Berlin in 1953. Morris was also mentored by Maxwell Bates. Morris later studied at the University of Victoria and the Vancouver School of Art, where his teachers included Jack Shadbolt, Roy Kiyooka and Don Jarvis. After completing his graduate studies at the Slade School of Art, where one of his teachers was Harold Cohen, he returned to Vancouver, and became acting curator of the Vancouver Art Gallery and the Centre for Communications and the Arts at Simon Fraser University. Morris, along with Vincent Trasov, founded the Image Bank in 1969, a system of postal correspondence between participating artists for the exchange of information and ideas. He co-founded the Western Front Society in 1973, and was its director for seven years.

The geometric abstractions he painted he made at the beginning of the 1970s have a sense of parody, one critic feels. He had absorbed an urban aesthetic from British Pop artists as well as the ideas of Marcel Duchamp during his training. Later, he looked to California for new materials, such as Plexiglas and mirrors. In 1968, he exhibited his Letters series in Vancouver, each with a title of a different city. However, his future art-making lay in other directions, such as Conceptual art. By 1970, many artists in Canada, Morris among them, were circulating mail art among themselves as a project linking artists and communities. Morris' work with the Image Bank has been heralded as instrumental to the early history of networking and the utilization of social interaction as art.

In 2021, his work was included in the exhibition Op Art in Vancouver in the Vancouver Art Gallery.

Michael Morris died in Victoria, British Columbia on 18 November 2022, at the age of 80.

== Awards ==
Morris was awarded an Honorary Doctorate of Humanities by Emily Carr University of Art and Design (2005). He is the recipient of the 2011 Governor General's Award in Visual and Media Arts and the 2015 Audain Prize for Lifetime Achievement in the Visual Arts.
