= Western Front Society =

Western Front
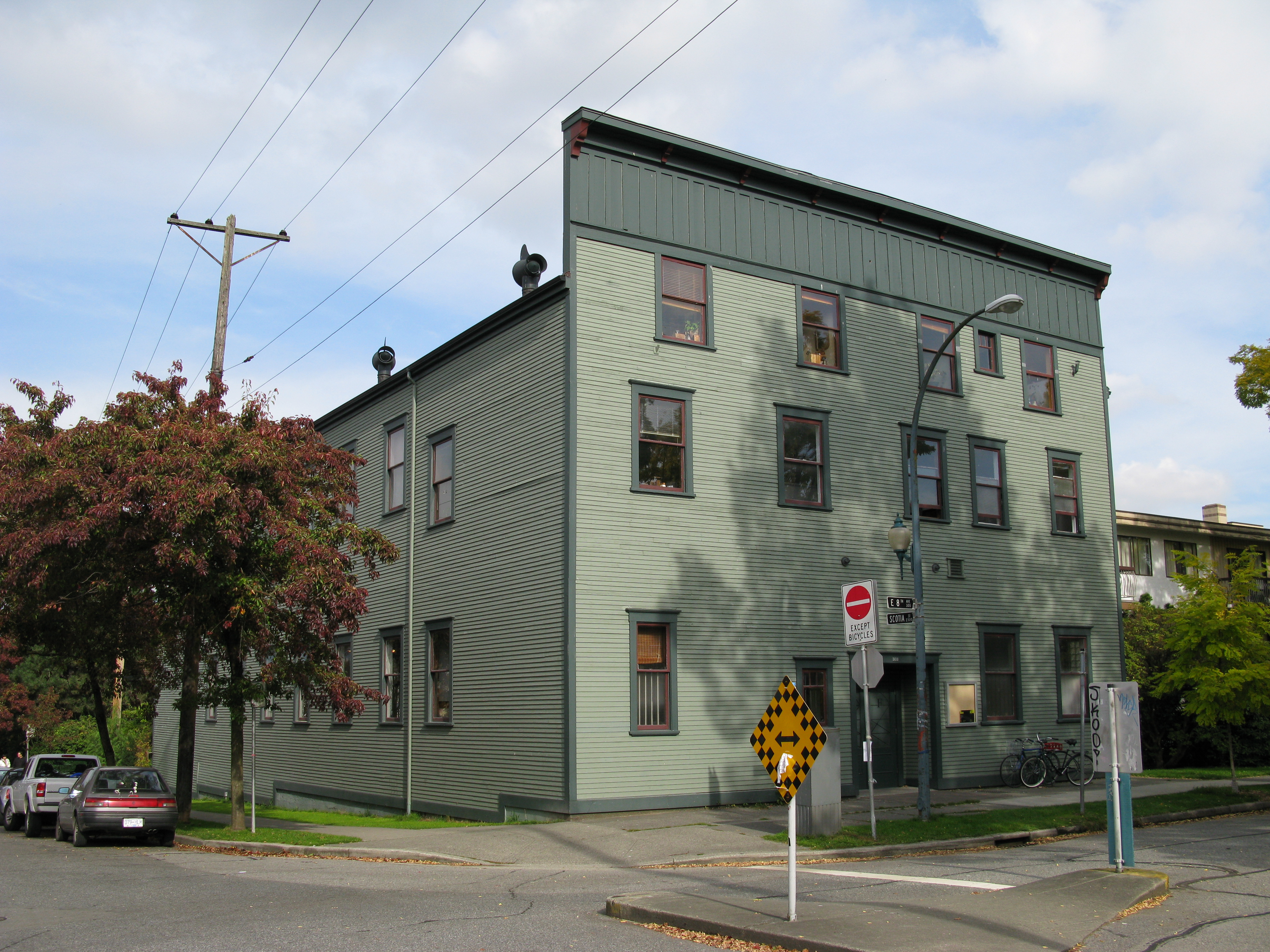
- Established: 1973
- Location: Mount Pleasant, Vancouver, British Columbia, Canada
- Type: Artist-run centre
- Public transit access: Translink buses 19, 8, 9, 3, 99-B.
- Website: https://westernfront.ca/

Western Front (Western Front Society) is an artist-run centre founded in 1973; it is located in Vancouver, British Columbia, Canada.

== History ==
The Western Front Society was founded in 1973 by eight artists: Martin Bartlett, Mo van Nostrand, Kate Craig, Henry Greenhow, Glenn Lewis, Eric Metcalfe, Michael Morris, Vincent Trasov. The founders wanted to create a space for the exploration and creation of new art forms.

After they purchased the former Knights of Pythias lodge hall located in Mount Pleasant, Vancouver, it quickly became a centre for poets, dancers, musicians and visual artists interested in exploration and interdisciplinary practices. Many of the Western Front's early works reflect this interdisciplinary ethos with early influences of Duchampian and Fluxus-based investigations into mail art, telecommunications art, live electronic music, video and performance art.

Western Front also supported a number of political and activist projects. In one of their most famous performance pieces, founding member Vincent Trasov adopted the personality of Mr. Peanut, gave a number of performances, and in 1974 ran for mayor of Vancouver. Mr. Peanut was so highly regarded that he was picked by The Vancouver Sun as one of the province's 100 most influential people as the end of the millennium approached in 1999. As a focal point of experimental art practice through the 1970s and 1980s, the Western Front, in connection with other artist-run-centres like it, played a major role in the development of electronic and networked art forms in a national and international context.

Over more than 40-years, the Western Front promoted critical investigations into and surrounding interdisciplinary, media-based, anti-object, and ephemeral practices with particular attention to the contexts and economies in which art is produced. While general curatorial priorities have remained dedicated to these practices, the Western Front's internal structure has continued to evolve and a number of distinct programs have been established and retired over the years including Performance Art, Movement Arts, Literary Arts and Front Magazine. The Western Front continues to program events and exhibitions related to these genres, but no longer supports fully dedicated departments. The Western Front continues to maintain programs in Media Art, New Music, and Exhibitions.

In 2015, the society received $1.5 million from the city of Vancouver Community Amenity Contribution (CAC) fund related to a nearby development by Vancouver property developers, Rize. The contribution enabled the society to purchase the building from its owners.

== Publications ==
In 1993, the Western Front published the Whispered Art History: Twenty Years at the Western Front, which documents and celebrates the first twenty years at one of Canada's first artist-run centres. The volume features essays by Peter Culley, Karen Knights, Judy Radul, Alex Varty and William Wood in addition to a comprehensive chronology of Western Front's events during its beginning years
