= Glenn Lewis (artist) =

Canadian artist (born 1935)

- Born: Glenn Alun Lewis; 1935 (age 89–90); Chemainus, British Columbia, Canada
- Education: 1961–64, Studied ceramics under Bernard Leach, St. Ives, Cornwall, England. 1958–59, Teaching Certificate, Faculty of Education, University of British Columbia, Vancouver, B.C. 1954-58, Graduated with honours in painting, drawing and ceramics, Vancouver School of Art (now Emily Carr University of Art and Design.)
- Notable work: An Earthly Paradise Journey Through Nine Stages Image installation, 1970-ongoing. Installed at the Berlin-Dahlem Botanical Garden and Devonian Harbour Park, Vancouver, 2013. Blue tape around City Block Video, 1969. Installed at Coal Harbour community centre, Vancouver, 2013; Berlin-Dahlem Botanical Garden, 2013; Camley Street Natural Park interpretive centre, London, 2012 I Won't Take Your Hand, Monsieur Manet, I Have Not Washed in Eight Days 2008
- Awards: Governor General’s Award in Visual and Media Arts (Video)

Glenn Lewis (born 1935) is a Canadian cross-disciplinary contemporary artist. Lewis is also known by his adopted artistic persona Flakey Rrose Hip [sic].

== Life and career ==
Lewis is a contemporary ceramicist, sculptor, potter, muralist, photographer, videographer, filmmaker, performance artist, and writer, as well as a teacher and administrator.

After receiving a scholarship from the Royal Canadian Legion in Kelowna, British Columbia in 1954, Lewis spent the next ten years studying painting, drawing, and ceramics, and teaching. In 1969, Lewis was commissioned by the Canadian government to create a work of art for Expo '70 in Osaka, Japan. Artifact, a sculptural ceramic work, was ultimately not shown, because it was thought by the commissioner of the Canadian pavilion to be obscene.

As a co-founding member of the New Era Social Club, Intermedia, and, in 1973, the Western Front, Lewis was one of an internationally recognised group of artists who established social practice as an artistic medium in Vancouver.

Lewis has been influential as an educator. Previous students of artist's include Gathie Falk, who studied sculpture under Lewis at the University of British Columbia.

In 2017, Lewis was named by the Canada Council for the Arts as one of eight recipients of the Governor General's Awards in Visual and Media Arts, for which he received a $25,000 cash prize.

Lewis lives and works in Roberts Creek, British Columbia.

== See also ==
- Storm Bay (British Columbia)
