= Anna Wong (artist) =

Chinese-Canadian artist and educator

- 黃綽英
- Wong at Pratt Graphics Center studio (1971)
- Born: Anna Chek Ying Wong; 1930; Vancouver, British Columbia, Canada
- Died: 2013 (aged 82–83)
- Other names: Anna Chou Ying Wong
- Education: Lingnan School
- Alma mater: Vancouver School of Art
- Occupation: Printmaker

Anna Chek Ying Wong (traditional Chinese: 黃綽英, jyutping: wong4 coek3 jing1, 1930 – 2013) was a Canadian artist, master printmaker and educator. She taught for 20 years at the Pratt Graphics Center.

== Life and career ==
Wong was born in 1930 and raised in the Chinatown district of Vancouver, British Columbia, Canada. She was the fifth child of Wong Kung Lai, a tailor, and Chu Man Wing, the daughter of a Christian Minister. Her father came from the village of Sam Lok Lei in Toisan county, in the Guangdong province of China. He began Modernize Tailors, which became a successful business in Chinatown, and was continually run by the Wong family until 2017.

As a young adult, she often acted as a caretaker for her younger siblings and relatives, especially when her parents left for a round-world trip in 1951. She devised classes for her siblings in subjects such as sewing, cooking and art, which became known as "Anna's School". By 1953, after her parents' return, she began working at Modernize Tailors as a bookkeeper and tailor, learning skills that would be useful in her later fabric works of the 1980s. Wong travelled extensively throughout her life; shortly after her parents return, Wong's father financed a cross-Canada trip for her and her sister Helen in which the two also visited New York.

Her family kept strong ties with China and their cultural heritage, and Anna would often accompany her father to Hong Kong to look at art and antiques. This culminated in Anna studying Chinese painting under the notable artist Chao Shao-an of the Lingnan School in Hong Kong from 1957–1958. After returning from Hong Kong, Wong attended night and weekend classes at the Vancouver School of Art (VSA, now Emily Carr University of Art and Design). In 1962, she was accepted for full-time classes at the School, which she would attend until 1966, receiving an undergraduate degree in creative printmaking. Her teachers included noted local artists such as Roy Kiyooka, Jack Shadbolt, Gordon Smith and Ann Kipling. While she was a student, she exhibited at the 1965 Burnaby Art Society National Print Show, receiving an Honourable Mention for her work Morphallaxis XXIX (1965).

After graduating in 1966, Wong received the Emily Carr Scholarship Award, which she used to begin Master's studies at the Pratt Graphics Centre (later part of Pratt Institute starting in 1986). Within a year, she was hired by director Andrew Stasik as a Professor in Studio Arts at the Pratt Graphics Centre. She returned to Vancouver every summer and ran a printing workshop in Burnaby Art Centre in 1971 with Stasik, and taught at the VSA and Malaspina Printmakers. Beginning in 1978, Wong also began taking trips to China after the country reopened to the West. She photographed landmarks including the Great Wall and Buddhist caves such as at Dunhuang or Lungmen, but also scenes of daily life, which became part of a new series of prints based on her travels. Wong continued teaching at the Pratt Graphics Centre until it closed in 1986. Afterwards, she returned to Vancouver and continued her art practice, sharing time between her Vancouver studio and Quadra Island studio, which she had set up in 1984.

During her career Wong held solo exhibitions at the Consulate General of Canada, New York City (1975), the National Art Museum of China, Beijing (1980), the Royal Ontario Museum (1986), the Richmond Art Gallery (1987), and Equinox Gallery, Vancouver, among others.

She was included in notable group exhibitions such as Contemporary Canadian Prints: A Survey, alongside works by Gordon Smith, John Esler, Toni Onley, Margot Lovejoy, Richard Lacroix, and others, at the Pratt Graphics Centre; as well as Canadian Contemporary Printmakers at the Bronx Museum of the Arts (1982). In 1982, her work was included in China Today, an exhibition at the Floating Foundation of Photography in New York City.

In 1984, her work represented Canada at the Republic of China International Print Exhibition at the Taipei Fine Arts Museum in Taiwan. The Vancouver exhibition and research project Chinatown Modern (2002), curated by Steven Tong at Centre A: Vancouver International Centre for Contemporary Asian Art, included Anna Wong, and addressed the "lack of public recognition of Asian Canadian artists who emerged in Vancouver during the 1960s and 1970s." Wong's work was included in the exhibition The Ornament of a House: Fifty Years of Collecting, at the Burnaby Art Gallery in 2017.

The Burnaby Art Gallery hosted Wong's retrospective exhibition Anna Wong: Traveller on Two Roads in 2018. The exhibition received an Award of Outstanding Achievement in Exhibitions from the Canadian Museums Association in 2019, toured to the Musée des beaux-arts de Sherbrooke in 2020, and the Nanaimo Art Gallery in 2021. The exhibition was accompanied by a full-colour publication of the same title in two bilingual editions (English/French/Chinese), with an introduction from curators Jennifer Cane and Ellen vanEijnsbergen, and essays from Keith Wallace and Zoë Chan.

== Art style ==
Wong's work has been noted for its dense layering, break from traditional printmaking processes and hybridity of themes and techniques. Her Hong Kong era brush paintings have been described as "rendering precise, fine lines and soft washes of colour...[adhering] to the nature-based repertoire of imagery conventionally found in Chinese brush painting." Wong took well after her teacher, which has also been attributed to her years learning calligraphy at the Mon Keang School, run by the Wong's Benevolent Association, from age 6. Curator Zoë Chan has connected Chinese brush painting closely with writing and has discussed how this combination of the visual and textual are visible throughout the rest of Wong's art practice.

After enrolling in VSA, she began creating ink line drawings that combined her calligraphic influence with the lessons of her teachers such as Ann Kipling. Chan has called these early works "Lighthearted and lyrical in tone...[suggesting] playful, even trippy reconfigurations of various language systems." Curator Keith Wallace notes that these works gradually became more dense and abstract, especially as she began printmaking in her second year of school. As Wallace writes, these works also gradually incorporated "ovoids and circles and squares that merge into one another...her work from this time demonstrated an interest in symbolic shapes representative of the universal, the cosmic and the mythical."

Wong's work returned to natural motifs after she began at the Pratt Graphic Centre, which included imagery of plants and animals, and often included text through the use of multiple different techniques including lithography, silkscreen and photo transfers. Her prints based on her travels to China further incorporated multiple printmaking techniques while also adding other mixed media elements such as ribbon, silk, paper and ink stamps. These were combined with photo transfers from photographs she took on her trips whose subjects included people on bicycles, graffiti, ancient Chinese sites, such as the Great Wall, and household items. Later in her life, Wong mostly worked on the quilts she had been producing since the 1970s. Her quilts incorporated the techniques and subject matter of her previous works, such as plants and text, which were printed directly onto fabric. She then had them sewn together by an Amish community in Pennsylvania.

== Selected exhibitions ==
2018, Anna Wong: Traveller on Two Roads, Burnaby Art Gallery, Burnaby, Canada

2002, Chinatown Modern, Centre A, Vancouver, Canada

1987, Richmond Art Gallery, Richmond, Canada

1984, Republic of China International Print Exhibition, Taipei City Museum of Fine Arts, Taipei, Taiwan

1982, Canadian Contemporary Printmakers, Bronx Museum of the Arts, New York, USA

1980, National Art Museum of China, Beijing, China

1978, Anna Wong, Equinox Gallery, Vancouver, Canada

1975, Graphics: Lithographs & Serigraphs, Canadian Consulate General, New York, USA

1972, Plantae Occidentalis: 200 Years of Botanical Art in British Columbia, UBC Botanical Gardens, Vancouver, Canada

1967, Joy and Celebration, UBC Fine Arts Gallery (now Morris and Helen Belkin Art Gallery), Vancouver, Canada

1966, Two Exhibitions: British Columbia Watercolours, Prints and Drawings, UBC Fine Arts Gallery (now Morris and Helen Belkin Art Gallery), Vancouver, Canada

== Collections ==
Anna Wong's work is held in public collections in Canada, including the Vancouver Art Gallery, Burnaby Art Gallery, Richmond Art Gallery, Confederation Centre Art Gallery, Dunlop Art Gallery, and the Art Gallery of Guelph.
