= Burnaby Art Gallery =

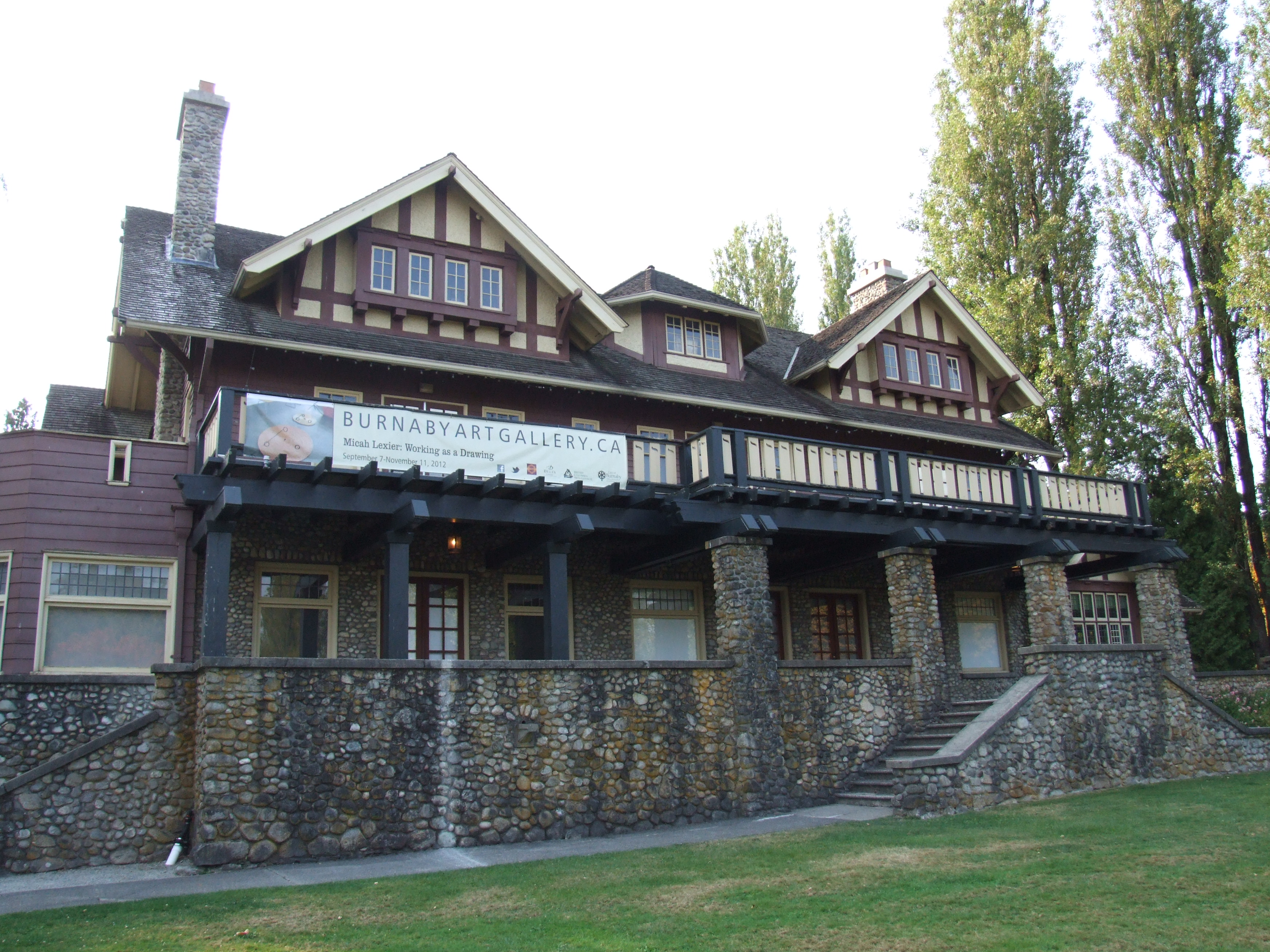
- Exterior facade of Burnaby Art Gallery in 2012
- Former name: Fairacres
- Established: 1967
- Location: 6344 Deer Lake Avenue; Burnaby, British Columbia, Canada
- Coordinates: 49.2410°N 122.9713°W
- Type: Art museum
- Director: Jennifer Cane
- Chairperson: Erika Justmann-Rowell
- Architect: Robert Percival Sterling Twizell
- Owner: City of Burnaby
- Website: www.burnaby.ca/things-to-do/arts-and-heritage/burnaby-art-gallery.html

The Burnaby Art Gallery (abbreviated as BAG) is an art museum in Burnaby, British Columbia, Canada. The museum is located on the northern periphery of Deer Lake Park, situated off of Deer Lake Avenue. The museum occupies Fairacres Mansion, designated as a historic site by the municipal and provincial governments.

The institution was established in 1967 by the Burnaby Art Society, who partnered with the City of Burnaby to exhibit its collection in the publicly owned Fairacres Mansion. The association continued to manage the museum until 1998, when the municipal government of Burnaby assumed control of the museum's collection, operations and governance.

The museum's permanent collection holds more than 7,000 artworks. It is the only public art collection in Canada dedicated to works on paper.

== Scope of operation ==
Established in 1967, the Burnaby Art Gallery is dedicated to collecting, preserving and presenting a contemporary and historical visual art program by local, national and internationally recognized artists. The Burnaby Art Gallery is operated by the City of Burnaby. The Burnaby Art Gallery cares for and manages over 7,000 works of art in the City of Burnaby Permanent Art Collection as well as the City of Burnaby's Public Art Collection.

The Gallery manages ongoing offsite exhibitions at two of Burnaby's Public Libraries. Public programs for adults, youth and children are located at the Burnaby Art Gallery Barn Studio adjacent to the main Gallery building.

== Building history ==
The Burnaby Art Gallery is located in Fairacres Mansion, which was designed by Robert Percival Sterling Twizell (1875-1964). Fairacres Mansion, also called Ceperley House, for its original owners, was built in 1910 at an estimated cost of C$150,000.00, making it the largest and most expensive house in Burnaby, British Columbia of its time. It was constructed in the Edwardian Arts and Crafts style with handmade fixtures, carpentry and tiled fireplaces. The original grounds included a garage and horse stables, an aviary, gazebo and pergola, lagoons, strawberry fields, greenhouses, a steam plant and a gardener's cottage. The tiles throughout the house were imported from England, fabricated by Conrad Dressler and his Medmenham Pottery. In the former billiards room and parlour, a grand oak mantelpiece, hand-carved by George Selkirk Gibson, bears a quote by Ralph Waldo Emerson: "The ornament of a house is the friends who frequent it." On the death of the original owner Grace Ceperley, the house was sold to a series of private owners. In 1939, it was acquired by Benedictine monks, and became an Abbey in 1953. The Order vacated the house in 1954 when it moved to Westminster Abbey (British Columbia) in Mission. After the Benedictines sold the property, it was used by the Canadian Temple of the More Abundant Life and as a fraternity house for Simon Fraser University's Delta Upsilon fraternity. In 1966, the Burnaby Art Society, led by Jack Hardman, Polly Svangtun, Sheila Kincaid and Winifred Denny, among others, worked with the City of Burnaby to purchase the 3.4 hectares (8.4 acres) site for C$166,000.00. The Burnaby Art Gallery opened its doors on June 10, 1967.

== Permanent collection ==
The Burnaby Art Gallery manages a collection of over 7,000 works on paper, primarily created by Canadian artists. The collection is unique in its specialization and is the only public collection devoted to works on paper in Canada. Highlights include substantial holdings by Anna Wong, Ernest Stephen Lumsden, Jack Shadbolt, Takao Tanabe, Susan Point, Gordon A. Smith, BC Binning, Roy Henry Vickers, Laurence Hyde, Gathie Falk, Sylvia Tait, Ann Kipling, and Alistair Bell.

The Burnaby Art Gallery has organized and hosted numerous temporary and travelling exhibitions.

- 4th National Print Show (1967)
- Feather Power (1971)
- Due West (1972)
- Mystic Circle (1973)
- Traces: Claude Breeze, Gathie Falk, Brian Fisher, D'arcy Henderson, Reg Holmes, Glenn Lewis, David Mayrs, Michael Morris, Gary Lee-Nova, Bodo Pfeifer, N.E.Thing Co. (1973)
- Douglas J. Cardinal: Architect (1978)
- Northwest Renaissance (1980)
- In the Beginning was the Word: Dutch, Prussian and Russian Mennonite Manuscripts in North American Collections (1983)
- Northern Exposure: Inuit Images of Travel (1986)
- A Quarter Century of Collecting (1992)
- Counterpoint: The Prints of Jack Shadbolt (1996)
- New Media: Artwork from the 60s and 70s in Vancouver (2002)
- Ernest S. Lumsden (2003)
- Shirley Bear: Wibhun (2007)
- Aganetha Dyck: Collaborations (2009)
- Gordon Smith: The Printed Pictures (2010)
- The Solitudes of Place: Recent Drawings by Ann Kipling (2011)
- Micah Lexier: Working as a Drawing (2012)
- Terrance Houle: National Indian Leg Wrestling League of North America (2012)
- Chronicles of Form and Place: Works on Paper by Takao Tanabe(2012)
- Gathie Falk: Paperworks (2014)
- Eli Bornowsky: All is Unmentionable, Up in the Air (2014)
- Tania Willard: dissimulation (2017)
- The Ornament of a House: 50 Years of Collecting (2017)
- Sylvia Tait: Journey (2018)
- Anna Wong: Traveller on Two Roads (2018-2021, touring)
- Gary Lee-Nova: Oblique Trajectories (2021)
- Lyse Lemieux: Trespassers/Intrus (2021)

== See also ==
- Burnaby Village Museum, also in Deer Lake Park
