= C. W. Parker Carousel No. 119 =

Carousel in Burnaby, British Columbia

Coordinates: 49.240718°N 122.967623°W

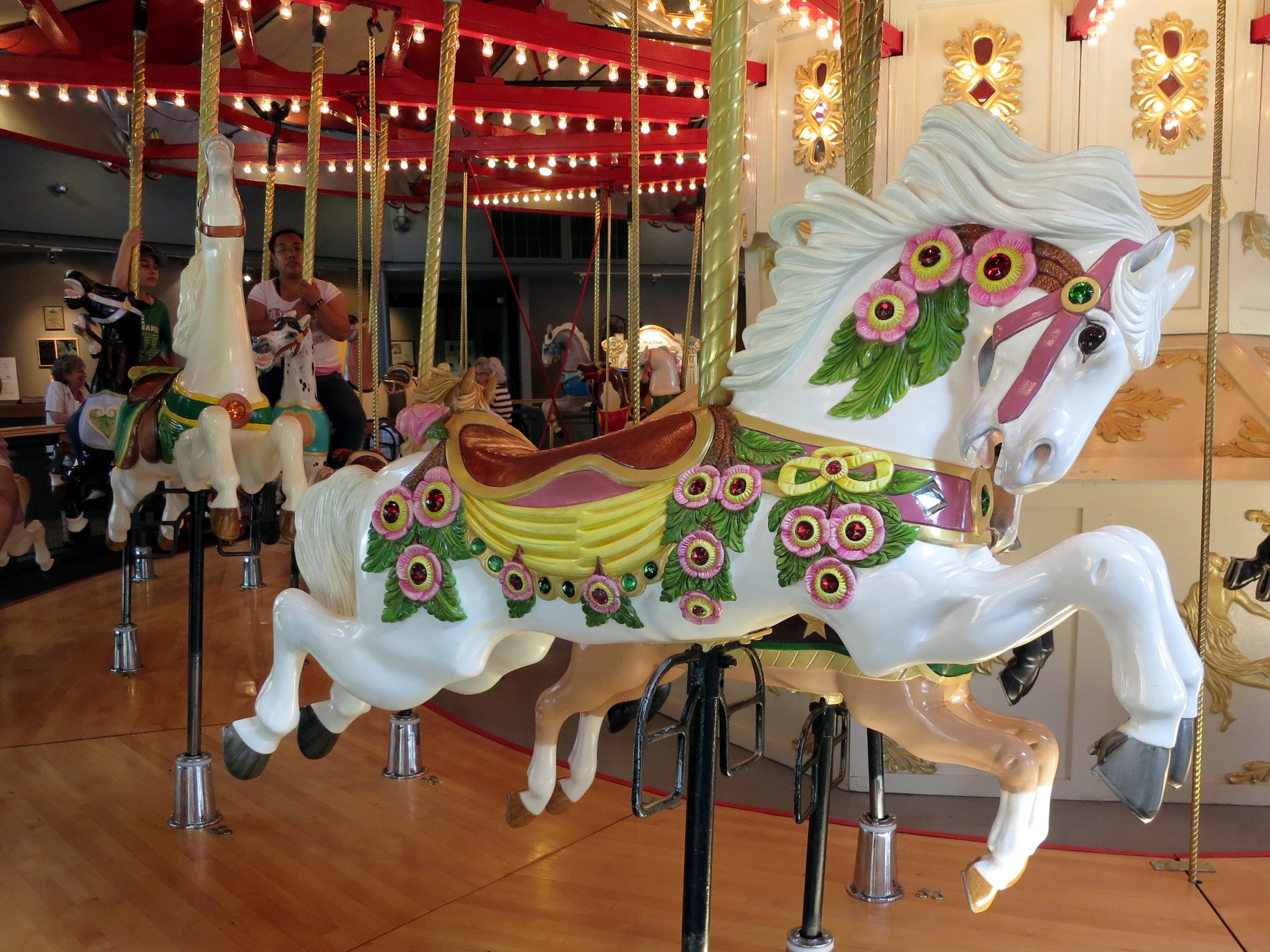
The C. W. Parker Carousel in 2012

The C. W. Parker Carousel No. 119 is a carousel built in 1912 that is currently operating in the Burnaby Village Museum at Deer Lake Park in Burnaby, British Columbia, Canada. The carousel was built by the C. W. Parker Company and is also known as the Parker #119 and the Burnaby Centennial Parker Carousel. The carousel was the 119th such machine built by the C. W. Parker Company, earning it its "Parker #119" nickname. The carousel contains 41 horses and operates at a pavilion known as the Don Wrigley Pavilion located at one of the museum's two entrances, earning the entrance the name "Carousel Entrance".

== History ==
The carousel was built in 1912 at Leavenworth, Kansas by Charles Wallace Parker who owned the C. W. Parker Company, and was the 119th one made by them. It was sold in 1913 for $5,886.00. The carousel toured Texas for two years with the Lone Star Circus. In 1915 the machine was shipped back to the factory.

It is believed that the machine was rebuilt by the factory. Some fancier horses and heavier rounding boards may have been added. Some of the horses were built in 1917 and some in 1920–1922. The history of the carousel from 1915 to 1936 is unknown. The carousel was purchased by Happyland, an amusement park in Vancouver, British Columbia in 1936.

The carousel remained at Happyland until the amusement park was demolished in 1957. It was moved to the new small pavilion in Playland, (another amusement park in Vancouver) until that too was demolished in 1972.

From 1972 to 1989, Parker #119 was operated outdoors, and was put away each winter.

In 1989 it was announced that the carousel would be sold off horse by horse at an auction in New York. Local residents came together to save the carousel and formed the "Friends of the Vancouver Carousel Society". It was at this time that the carousel was nicknamed the Parker #119.

In May 1989, the Burnaby Village Museum agreed to provide a home for the carousel and the "Friends", led by President Don Wrigley, set about raising the $350,000 to purchase the machine. Keith Jamieson, a carousel expert, was brought in to coordinate the rebuilding project. In 1990, the carousel was purchased. Funds were also raised to pay for the restoration. People who donated money could sponsor a horse and later name it. The museum agreed to build a new pavilion to house the carousel. The pavilion, named the Don Wrigley Pavilion was completed in 1993. The carousel was then named the Burnaby Centennial Parker Carousel.

== Carousel horses ==
The carousel's horses are listed here:

#	Name	Sponsor	Color	Style
1	Captain Julius	Don and Dorothy Wrigley and Family	Grey	Jumper
2	Royal Burnaby Belle	Burnaby Area Royal Banks Staff	Sorrel	Jumper
3	Champion	Vancouver City Savings Credit Union	Brown black	Hunter's Pride
4	Firefly	Burnaby Firefighters Charitable Society Local 323	Black	Stargazer
5	Phar Lap	Magaret Mitchell	Red chestnut	Cowboy
6	Scampering Dawn	Dennis and Cice Brown	Yellow-white	American Beauty Rose
7	Vanessa	Parkland Ventures Ltd.	Palomino	Jumper
8	Treasure	Elsie T. Gordon	Dark bay	Stargazer
9	Mignonette	Ethel and Faye Stebner, and Ken Diamond	Grey-white	American Beauty Rose
10	Valiant	Paula V. Tanchyk	Blue-black	Armored Horse
11	Vivian	Barbara Becher	Yellow-white	Lillie Belle
12	Nareena	Gary, Umeeda and Nareena Switlo	Brown roan	Stargazer
13	Nipoti	Bill and Ruth Copeland	Bay Ovaro Pinto	Flag
14	Mr. Ed	Ethel Stebner	Palomino	Jumper
15	Allegro	Harry and Hazel Sumner	Light bay	Jumper
16	John Ernest	Ernie and Pat Beaucamp	Chestnut Sorrel	Cowboy
17	Betty B.	The Beedie Group	Brown black	American Shield
18	Bingo	Gordon Robson	Chestnut	Hunter's Pride
19	Dyck	Margery M. Robinson	Dark liver chestnut	Jumper
20	Twister	Dennis and Flory Bosa	Strawberry roan Appaloosa	Flag
21	Centennial	Burnaby City Council	Palomino	Jumper
22	Tommy D.	Mayor Bill Copeland and Burnaby MPs	Cream white	Stargazer
23	Rose B.	Rose Bancroft Sr., George Bancroft, and Rose Bancroft	Brown black	Jumper
24	James	Rose and George Bancroft	Sorrel	Jumper
25	Pisces	Gin and Dorcas Farn	White	Jumper
26	Meg	Derek Corrigan	Dapple grey	Jumper
27	Wheeler	The Rotary Club of Burnaby - Deer Lake	Burgundy	Jumper
28	Guppy	Dorothy E. Wrigley and Cice Brown	Palomino	Jumper
29	Rebel	Burnaby South Secondary School	Dapple grey	Jumper
30	Royal Warrior	Buckingham Elementary School	Palomino	Jumper
31	Venus	Restaurant and Food Services Association of B.C.	Grey white	Jumper
32	The Colonel	Dr. E. M. Stevens	Buckskin	Jumper
33	Happy Marie	Marie and Fred Donatiello and Mary (Lily) McCormack	Blue roan	Jumper
34	Shannon	Instabox Vancouver	Sorrel	Jumper
35	Annie	Parklane Ventures Ltd.	Leopard spot Appaloosa	Jumper
36	Royal George	Roy Brainerd	Strawberry roan	Jumper
37	Old Paint^{1}	Burnaby Village Museum Staff and Volunteers	Creamy white	Cowboy
38	Gold Heart Chariot^{2}	Variety Club	White	N/A
39	A. Loving; B. Caring; C. Sharing; D. Helping Hand^{3}	Ronald McDonald Children's Charities of Canada	A & B: Black; C & D: White	N/A
40	Wurlitzer Band Organ^{1} ^{2} ^{4}	N/A	White	N/A
41	Senate Appointee and Franworth^{1} ^{5}	Diamond Foundation	N/A	N/A

Notes:

1. Not on carousel
2. Not really a horse, but considered one of listing purposes
3. Is really four small metal ponies and a wheelchair
4. Has many sponsors
5. Is really two small metal ponies

=== Carousel horse notes ===
This section notes horses that are not actually on the carousel and horses that are not really horses.

Some of the carousel's horses are not actually horses, but are listed as such for the purpose of creating a list on the carousel's horses. Examples of this are Horse #38, "Gold Heart Chariot" and Horse #40, "Wurlitzer Band Organ".

Horse #37, known as "Old Paint", was sponsored by the Burnaby Village Museum and was not restored, as a reminder to visitors of the sorry state the carousel was in when the museum first acquired it. The horse was named for the "old paint" that was originally on the carousel before it was restored. The horse is currently in a display case next to the carousel.

Horse #39 is four small ponies and a wheelchair. This was placed to make the carousel accessible to toddlers and disabled people.

Horse #41 is really two small ponies. While originally on the carousel with Horse #39, they were removed to make room for Horse #39's wheelchair and placed, one each, at the museum's two entrances.

There were originally two chariots on the carousel. One has since gone missing while the carousel was under the ownership of a theme park. The ponies which now form Horses #39 and #41 were added to the area where the other chariot was originally placed. Horse #38 was also cut in half, removing the backdrop and adding more seats to the carousel (a plan to generate more income from the carousel by allowing more people to ride it, done by one of the carousel's theme park owners). When the carousel was bought by the museum, Horse #38 underwent restoration, adding a backdrop to it, making it a chariot once again.

== Carousel horse rows ==
Row 1: Outside: #1 Captain Julius, Middle: #13 Nipoti, Inside: #25 Pisces

Row 2: Outside: #2 Royal Burnaby Belle, Middle: #14 Mr. Ed, Inside: #26 Meg

Row 3: Outside: #3 Champion, Middle: #15 Allegro, Inside: #27 Wheeler

Row 4: Outside: #4 Firefly, Middle: #16 John Ernest, Inside: #28 Guppy

Row 5: Outside: #5 Phar Lap, Middle: #17 Betty B., Inside: #29 Rebel

Row 6: Outside: #6 Scampering Dawn, Middle: #18 Bingo, Inside: #30 Royal Warrior

Row 7: Outside: #7 Vanessa, Middle: #19 Dyck, Inside: #31 Venus

Row 8: Outside: #8 Treasure, Middle: #20 Twister, Inside: #32 The Colonel

Row 9: Outside: #9 Mignonette, Middle: #21 Centennial, Inside: #33 Happy Marie

Row 10: Outside: #10 Valiant, Middle: #22 Tommy D., Inside: #34 Shannon

Row 11: Outside: #11 Vivian, Middle: #23 Rose B. Inside: #35 Annie

Row 12: Outside: #12 Nareena, Middle: #24 James, Inside: #36 Royal George

== See also ==
- City of Waterloo Carousel
- Jantzen Beach Carousel, a C. W. Parker carousel in use in Portland, Oregon until 2012
- Lander Park Carousel
