= Lander Park Carousel =

Carousel in Abilene, Kansas

- Parker Carousel
- U.S. National Register of Historic Places
- U.S. National Historic Landmark
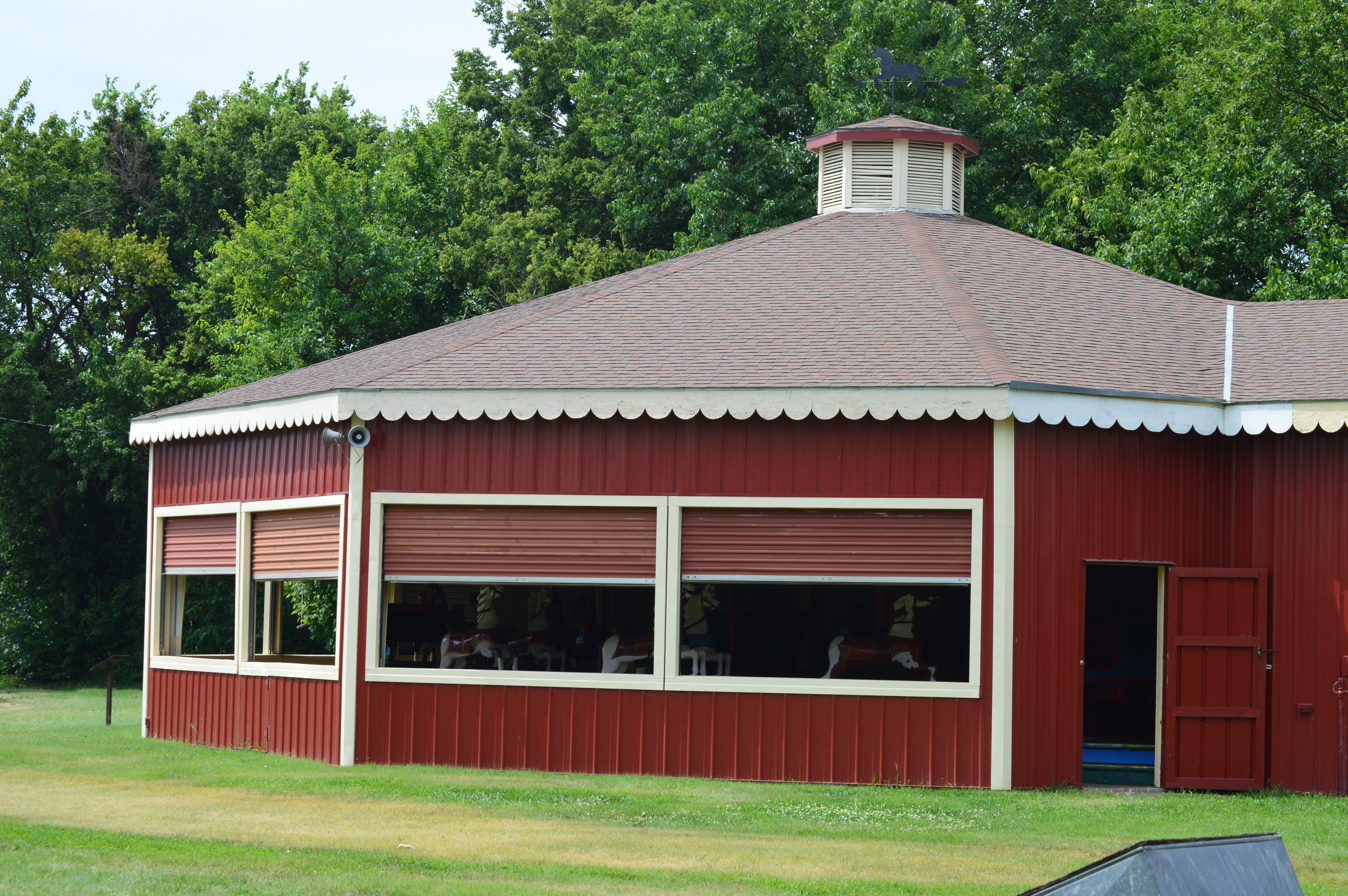

- Location within Kansas Location within the United States
- Location: 412 South Campbell Street, Abilene, Kansas
- Coordinates: 38°54′41″N 97°12′31″W
- Area: less than one acre
- Built: c. 1898
- Architect: Charles W. Parker Amusement Co.
- NRHP reference No.: 87000813

Significant dates
- Added to NRHP: February 27, 1987
- Designated NHL: February 27, 1987

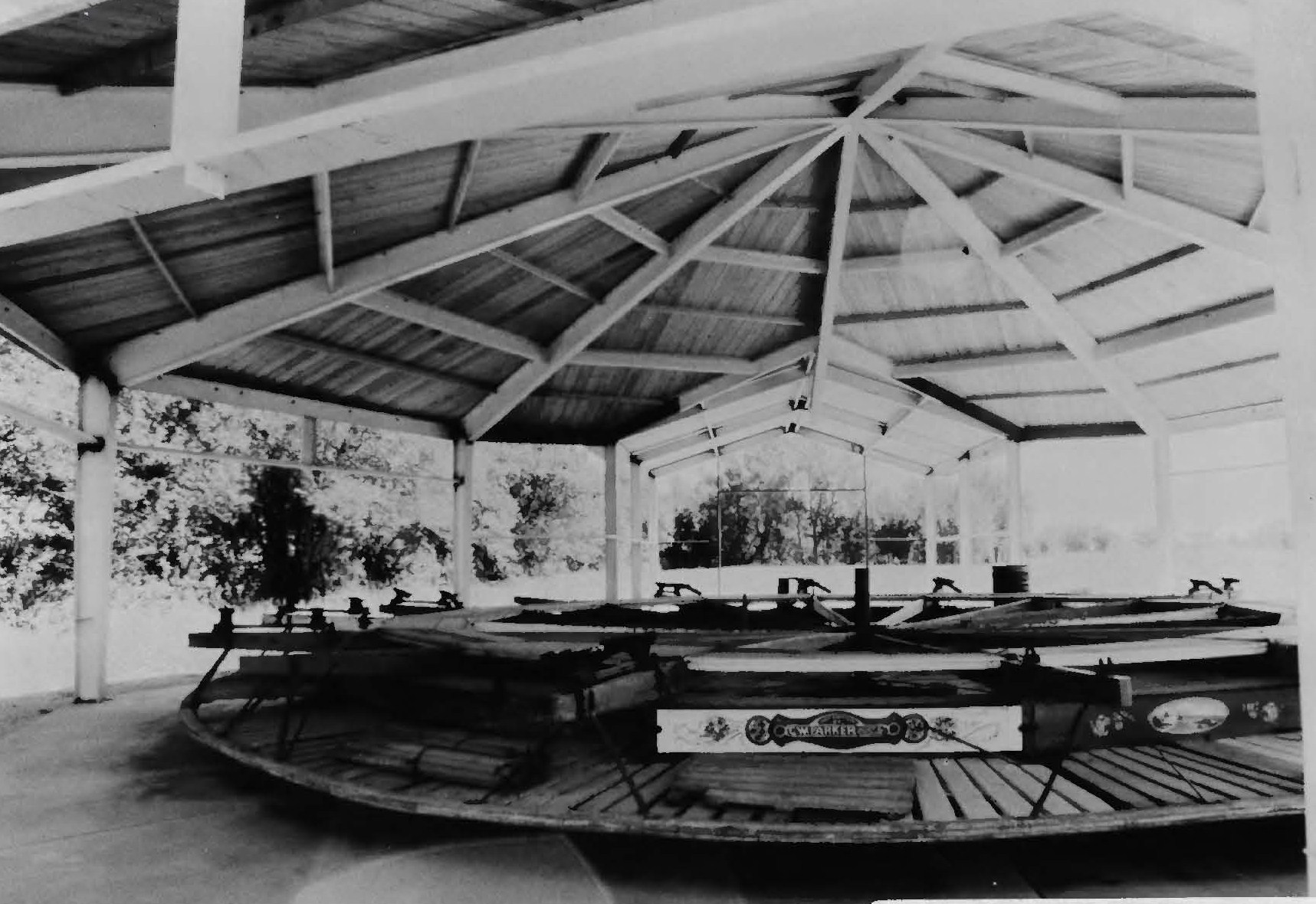
Parker Carousel in 1985

The Lander Park Carousel, known also as Parker Carousel, Dickinson County Parker Carousel, or Riverton Park Carousel is a historic carousel in Abilene, Kansas. Built around the turn of the 20th century, it is one of only three surviving carousels out of about 68 built by Abilene's Charles W. Parker Carousel Company, and it is the only remains of the company in Abilene today. It was declared a National Historic Landmark in 1987. It is now a feature of the Dickinson County Heritage Center, a local history museum.

== Description and history ==
The Parker Carousel is located in southeastern Abilene, on the grounds of the Dickinson County Heritage Center, just east of the Dwight D. Eisenhower Presidential Library, Museum and Boyhood Home on South Campbell Street. It is housed in a roughly octagonal single-story wood-frame structure, with an attached extension. The carousel consists of a circular wooden platform, whose outer portion has wheels that ride on a track set on the ground. The platform is fitted with 24 horses and four chariots. The horses are mounted in metal frames that impart a rocking motion when the carousel is in operation. The structure has no top of its own, as it was originally intended to be placed under a tent. The carousel is rotated via either an electric motor, or a period steam engine modified to meet modern safety standards. The power source is located in the extension, and is connected to the carousel by cabling.

The carousel was built sometime between 1898 and 1901 by the Charles W. Parker Carousel Company of Abilene. The company manufactured about 68 carousels, of which this is one of only three to survive, and is now the only surviving reminder of the company's presence in the community. Parker's carousels were renowned for their particularly graceful carved horses. This carousel was part of a traveling show Parker operated, and was purchased from that show by a mechanic in Lander, Wyoming in 1928. There it was set up for annual Fourth of July celebrations. In 1959 it was purchased by the operated of a drive-in theater in Riverton, Wyoming, where it was operated until his death. His widow wanted to keep the machine intact, and a transfer of the carousel to the Dickinson County Historical Society was mediated by the Smithsonian Institution in 1976.

== See also ==
- Amusement rides on the National Register of Historic Places
- List of National Historic Landmarks in Kansas
- National Register of Historic Places listings in Dickinson County, Kansas
- C. W. Parker Carousel in British Columbia
