= Eldon Grier =

- Born: April 13, 1917; London, England
- Died: July 28, 2001 (aged 84); Vancouver, British Columbia, Canada
- Occupations: Poet, Artist
- Spouse: Sylvia
- Children: Sharon, Alexa, Brock
- Writing career
- Notable work: An Ecstasy
- Movement: Modernist

Eldon Grier (13 April 1917 – 28 July 2001) was a Canadian poet and artist. Grier is best known for his poems regarding travel and art. Grier's early poems were influenced by Louis Dudek and Ralph Gustafson. His later works have been compared to those of Al Purdy. Grier has written many poems to painters and sculptors. His poems focus heavily on visual imagery and colours. In 1997 Grier was made a life member of the League of Canadian Poets.

== Biography ==
Grier was born in London, England and raised in Montreal, Canada. He died at the age of 84 in Vancouver, British Columbia. His father was Charles Brockwill Grier and his mother was Kathleen Phyllis Black Grier. His father was captain in the Canadian army. Following his service in the army Charles became a stockbroker and proceeded to send his son to private school. Grier married his first wife [Elizabeth Temple Jamieson) in 1944 and his daughter (Sharon) was born in 1948. Elizabeth and Charles were divorced in 1952 and Grier married his second wife Sylvia Tait in 1954. They had two children together, a daughter named Alexa and a son named Brock. Grier was diagnosed with tuberculosis in his mid-thirties and underwent treatment for two years before he recovered.

Grier started his career as an artist. At age seventeen Grier failed to find financial stability through art. In 1945 he travelled to Mexico to study fresco painting from Alfredo Zalce. He was apprenticed to Diego Rivera as a plasterer. He later became a professor at the Montreal Museum of Fine Arts under Arthur Lismer.

Eldon Grier travelled Europe from 1955 to 1965. Grier spent his winters in Mexico. He began writing poetry in Spain in 1955. Grier decided to become a poet because he felt that meaning was expressed more effectively though words. He was a modernist. His poems manipulate lines shifts, rhyme and contain complicated stanzaic shapes.

== Works ==
Grier's best known works are: A morning from scraps (1955), The year of the sun:poems (1956), The ring of ice (1957), Mazanillo & other poems (1958), A friction of lights (1963), Pictures on the skin (1967), The women of Quebec (1969), Selected poems:1955-1970 (1971), and The assassination of colour (1978).
