= Sylvia Tait =

Canadian artist (born 1932)

- Born: March 20, 1932 (age 93); Montreal, Quebec
- Education: Montreal Museum of Fine Arts School of Art and Design (1949–1953)
- Known for: abstract painter and printmaker.
- Spouse: Eldon Grier (m. 1954)

Sylvia Tait (born March 20, 1932) is a Canadian abstract painter and printmaker.

== Career ==
Tait attended the Montreal Museum of Fine Arts School of Art and Design from 1949 to 1953, completing an undergraduate degree. Her instructors included Arthur Lismer, Jacques de Tonnancour, Marian Scott, Eldon Grier, Gordon Webber, and William Armstrong. She held her first solo exhibition in 1953 at the YMCA in Montreal, presenting semi-abstract portrait and still life oil paintings.

Tait married artist and poet Eldon Grier in 1954. He had long-standing connections in Mexico (including with Diego Rivera) and they spent extended periods in San Miguel de Allende in the late 1950s. In Mexico, Tait participated in several group exhibitions and presented two solo exhibitions at the Instituto Allende in 1959 and 1960. The couple moved to British Columbia in 1968 and Tait set up her studio in West Vancouver. She had a number of solo exhibitions in the 1970s and received awards. In the 1980s, Tait created sets and costumes for opera, dance and theatre including, Amahl and the Night Visitors, in 1980, The Stand, Anna Wyman Dance, 1987, and Thisness, a mono-drama by Istvan Anhalt, in 1986. She also won competitions for art in public spaces in 2004 and 2005.

Her work is in many public gallery collections such as the Vancouver Art Gallery and Musée d'art contemporain de Montréal. She was a member of the Canadian Society of Graphic Art (1963), and the Malaspina Printmakers, Vancouver, British Columbia (1978).

== Exhibitions and influences ==
Tait has exhibited in Canada, Mexico and Ecuador since the 1950s. Since 1977, Tait has been represented by the Bau-Xi Gallery in Vancouver, British Columbia. Tait's work Aquascapes was installed at the West Vancouver Pool in 2004, and fully restored in 2013.

=== Notable exhibitions ===
- In 1974–1976, "The Graphic Art of Sylvia Tait: Part I, Drawings", Simon Fraser University Gallery, Burnaby, British Columbia; travelling, Penticton, Prince George, Smithers, Prince Rupert, Terrace, Grand Prairie, Dawson Creek, Williams Lake, Vernon, British Columbia, and Atlantic Provinces Art Circuit
- In 1974 (simultaneously with Part I), "The Graphic Art of Sylvia Tait: Part II, Serigraphs," was held at the Mido Gallery, in Vancouver
- In 1981, "Canvas, Wood and Paper", Burnaby Art Gallery, Burnaby, British Columbia
- In 2011, the West Vancouver Museum exhibited a mini-retrospective of Tait's art work "as a tribute to her career"
- In 2014, Tait exhibited in the West Vancouver Museum's exhibition "The And of the Land" alongside other British Columbia artists such as Lawren Harris, Jack Shadbolt, and Takao Tanabe
- In 2017, Tait exhibited in the Burnaby Art Gallery's exhibition "Sylvia Tait: Journey"

=== Influences ===
Among her influences were the Abstract Expressionism art movement and classical music. Although Tait's early paintings were representational, her mature and current works on canvas and paper are purely abstract, showing a complex use of layered high key colour. Tait's paintings have been described as "visual image-like poetry, using colour instead of words."

== Publications ==
Tait collaborated with Grier and John Huberman in the design and illustration of several books, including:

- Grier, Eldon. The Ring of Ice: Poems. Montreal: Cambridge Press, 1957. Graphics by Sylvia Tait.
- Grier, Eldon. A Friction of Lights. Toronto: Contact Press, 1963; London: Poets' and Painters' Press. Dust jacket designed by Sylvia Tait.
- Grier, Eldon. Pictures on the Skin: Poems. Montreal: Delta Canada, 1967. Drawings and collages by Sylvia Tait.
- Huberman, John and Sylvia Tait. For a lark: a remedial field guide for confused birdwatchers. Vancouver: J. Huberman, c1974.
- Grier, Eldon. The Assassination of Colour. Fredericton, New Brunswick: Fiddlehead Poetry Books, 1978. Cover by Sylvia Tait. ISBN 0920110606

== Selected awards ==
- 1964, Prize, 2nd Winnipeg Biennale, Winnipeg Art Gallery, Winnipeg, Manitoba
- 1965, Second Prize, Flowering Tangent, Canadian Group of Painters, Montreal, Quebec
- 1975, Award of Excellence, Malaspina Printmakers Society, Vancouver, British Columbia
- 1976, Third Prize, Hadassah Nordau Exhibition, Vancouver, British Columbia
- 1978, Honourable Mention, Savoy Cabbages, Malaspina Printmakers Society, Vancouver, British Columbia
