= Carousel =

Type of amusement ride

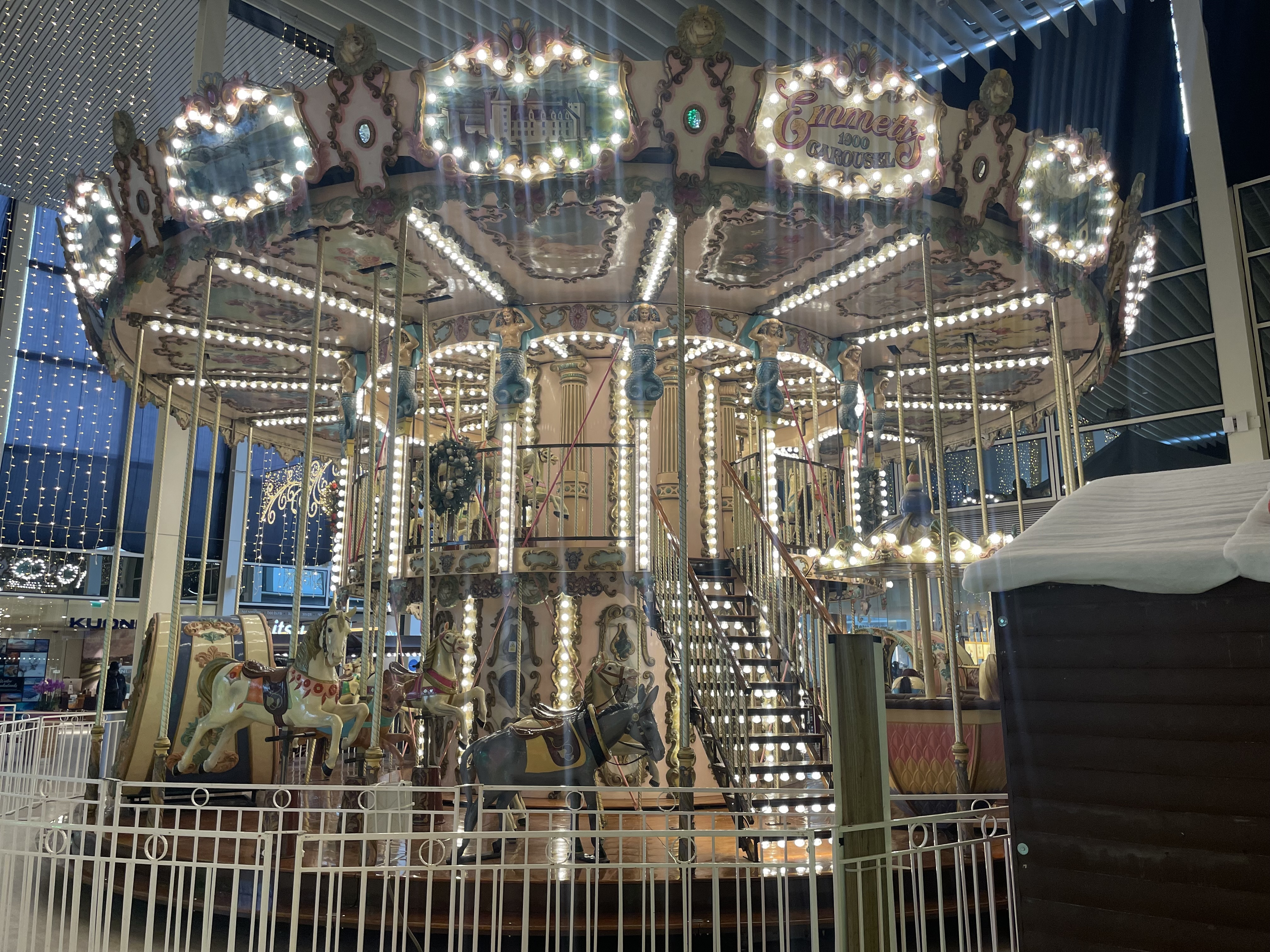
A double-decker carousel in Milton Keynes, England at Christmas

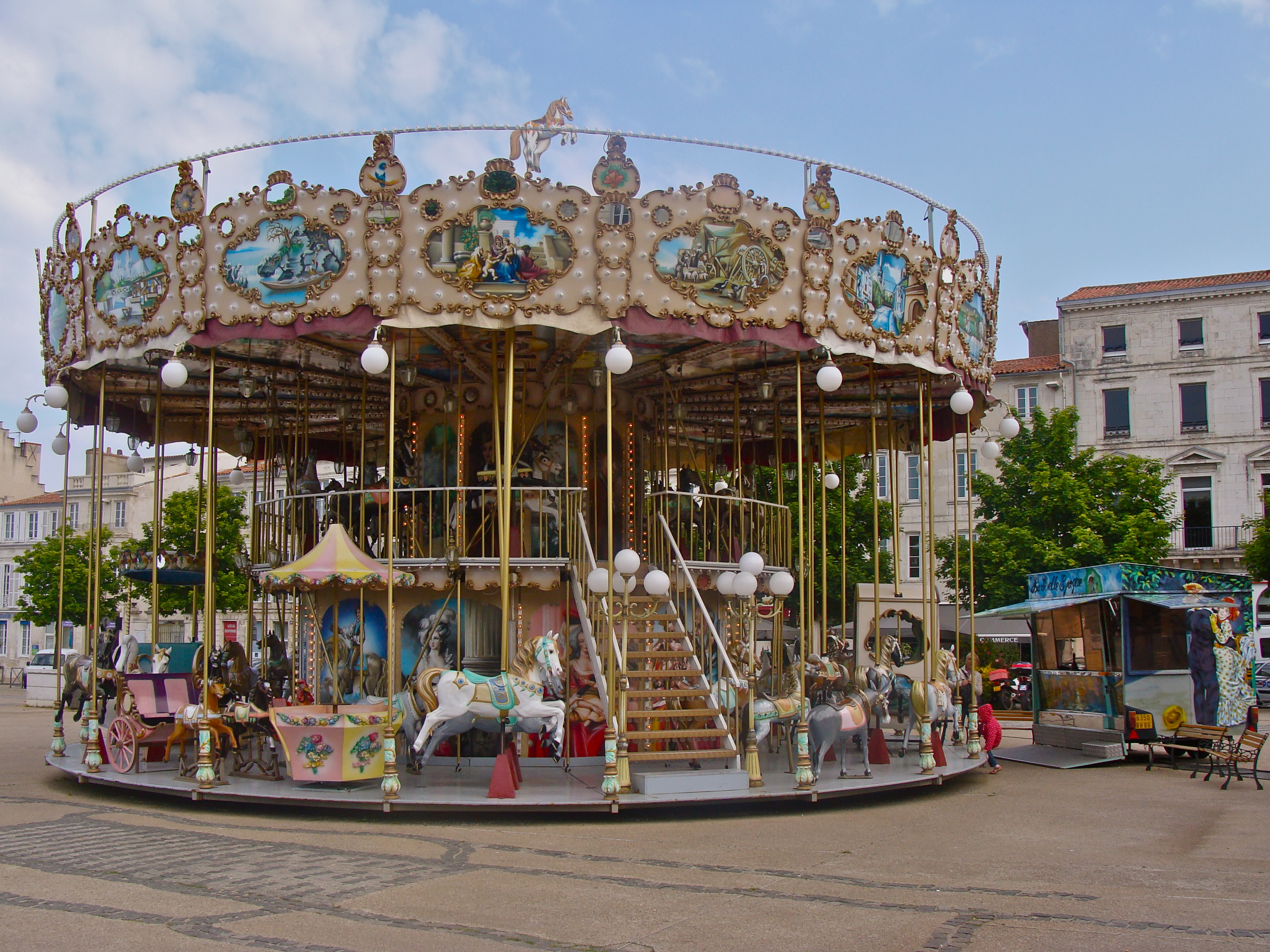
A double-decker carousel in France

A carousel in Tokyo Dome City in Japan

A carousel or carrousel (mainly North American English), merry-go-round (International English), flying horses, or galloper (British English) is a type of amusement ride consisting of a rotating circular platform with seats for riders. The seats are traditionally in the form of rows of animal figures (usually horses) mounted on posts, many of which move up and down to simulate galloping. Sometimes chair-like or bench-like seats are used, and occasionally mounts can take the form of non-animals, such as airplanes or cars. Carousel rides are typically accompanied by looped circus music.

The word carousel derives from the French word carrousel, meaning little battle, a reference to European tournaments of the same name starting in the 17th century. Participants in these tournaments rode live horses and competed in various cavalry skill tests, such as ring jousting. By the end of that century, simple machines were created in which wooden horses were suspended from a spinning wheel mounted on top of a central pole, allowing competitors to practice ring jousting without tiring their horses. These early contraptions soon became common with traveling fairs in Europe, and by the 19th century, their popularity spread to North America, where they became staple attractions in traveling carnivals and some of the first purpose-built amusement parks. Most historic carousel animal figures, including those made during the golden age of carousels from the 1870s to the early 1930s, were made from wood, and were carved and painted by hand. Hand-carved wood was replaced with more economic aluminum castings and later fiberglass castings in the 20th century. Many carousels operate around the world today and are often used to symbolize the entire amusement industry.

== History ==
=== Early carousels ===
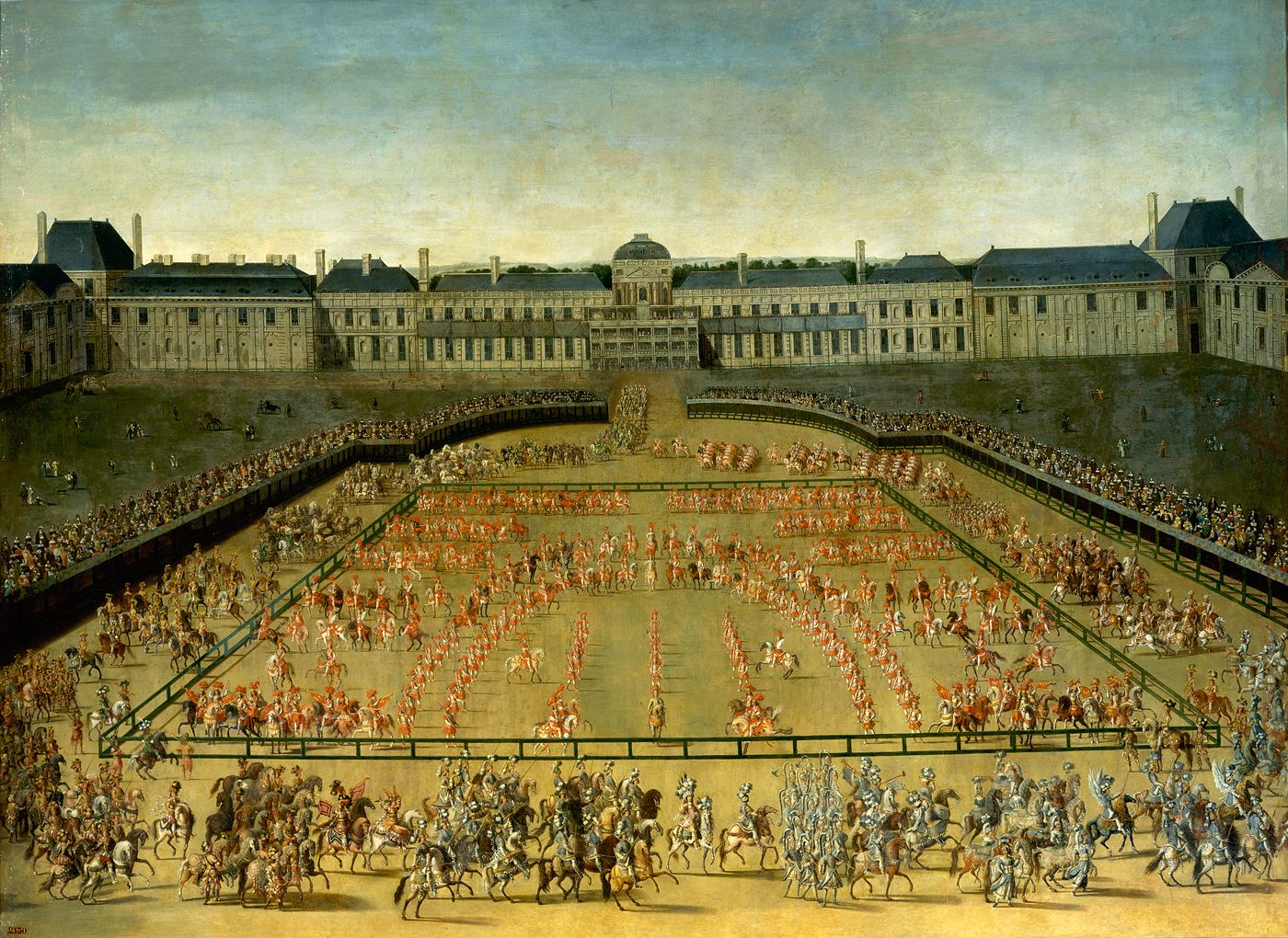
A carrousel tournament organized in the Tuileries Palace courtyard by Louis XIV in 1662 to celebrate the birth of his son and heir. This event and others like it inspired the creation of the carousel amusement ride.

In 17th-century Europe, equestrian royal tournaments known as "carrousels" (French for little battle) began to be held. The most famous carrousel of this kind was held by Louis XIV in June 1662, in the courtyard of the Tuileries Palace, to celebrate the birth of his son and heir apparent. The site of the event, next to the Louvre, is still known as the "Place du Carrousel." One of the skill tests performed during these events was ring jousting, a practice originally developed by 10th-century Arabian and Moorish horsemen in which rings suspended from posts or trees would be speared by a lance, sometimes at full gallop. The noblemen participating in these tournaments often overworked their horses while practicing, so an early device was developed in the late 17th century to allow participants to practice ring jousting without the need for riding horses. It consisted of wooden horses suspended from a wheel mounted on a central pole, which was spun by a work horse walking around the contraption's perimeter.

Among the attractions of the [Wilhelmsbad] entertainment venue during my boyhood years was, above all, the carousel. What a delight to be driven around in a tight circle on life-size wooden horses, or in graceful open carriages, drawn by wooden white and black horses. The knight's games were fun to watch. With childlike seriousness, indeed with an almost solemn air, people played ring jousting and dart throwing, slashed Turks' heads as they drove or rode past, and hurled balls into a Moor's wide-open mouth.

— Karl Cäsar von Leonhard, recalling late-18th century childhood memories in what is now Germany, 1854

Devices like these became popular among commoners by the early 18th century, and carousels (as they came to be known) were being built and operated at various fairs and gatherings in Central Europe. Animal figures and mechanisms would be crafted during the winter months and the family and workers who made them would go touring in wagon trains, operating their carousels at various venues. These early carousels had no platforms; the animals would hang from chains and fly out from the centrifugal force of the spinning mechanism. They were often powered by animals walking in a circle or people pulling a rope or cranking.

The usage of carousels eventually spread to other parts of the world. Primitive carousels in North America were present since at least the late 18th century; in 1784, the New York City Common Council passed a law forbidding their use due to being unsafe.

=== 19th century ===
By the mid-19th century, the platform carousel was developed; rideable animal figures and chariots were fixed to a circular floor that would rotate around a central pole. These carousels were called "dobbies" and were operated manually by the operator or by ponies. Carousels in the United Kingdom, where they are also known as "gallopers," usually turn clockwise; while those in North America and mainland Europe typically turn counterclockwise.

==== United Kingdom ====
A traditional steam-powered gallopers in Blists Hill Victorian Town in the UK, built by Thomas Walker in 1911. Note its clockwise rotation.

By 1803, John Joseph Merlin had a carousel in his Mechanical Museum in London, where gentry and nobility liked to gather on winter evenings. The horses "floated free over a pole." It was connected to a "big musical instrument that played a fully orchestrated concerto" and from the first note, the carousel would start turning while each horse would make a galloping movement with a visitor riding on its back. Merlin did not patent his inventions and engineers were allowed to come to create their own models of his creations. By the mid-19th century, the carousel became a popular fixture at English fairs. The first steam-powered mechanical roundabout, invented by Thomas Bradshaw, appeared at the Pot Market fair in Bolton in about 1861. It was described by a Halifax Courier journalist as "a roundabout of huge proportions, driven by a steam engine which whirled around with such impetuosity, that the wonder is the daring riders are not shot off like cannonball, and driven half into the middle of next month."

Soon afterwards, English engineer Frederick Savage began to branch out of agricultural machinery production into the construction of fairground machines, swiftly becoming the chief innovator in the field. Savage's fairground machinery was exported all over the world. By 1870, he was manufacturing amusement rides similar to carousels with velocipedes (an early type of bicycle), and he soon began experimenting with other possibilities, including a roundabout with boats that would pitch and roll on cranks with a circular motion, a ride he called 'Sea-on-Land'. In 1880, Savage applied a similar innovation to the more traditional mount of the carousel horse; he installed gears and offset cranks on the platform carousels, thus giving the animals their well-known up-and-down motion as they traveled around the central pole – the galloping horse. The platform served as a position guide for the bottom of the pole and as a place for people to walk or other stationary animals or chariots to be placed. He called this ride the 'Platform Gallopers'. He also developed the 'platform-slide' which allowed the mounts to swing out concentrically as the carousel built up speed. Fairground organs (band organs) were often present (if not built-in) when these machines operated. Eventually, electric motors and lights were installed, giving the carousel its classic look. These mechanical innovations came at a crucial time when increased prosperity meant that more people had time for leisure and had spare money to spend on entertainment. It was in this historical context that the modern fairground ride was born, with Savage supplying this new market demand. In his 1902 Catalogue for Roundabouts, he claimed to have "... patented and placed upon the market all the principal novelties that have delighted the many thousands of pleasure seekers at home and abroad."

==== United States ====
The first known individual carousel with surviving historical records in the US was opened in the 1840s by Franz Wiesenoffer in Hessville, Ohio. On July 25, 1871, William Schneider of Davenport, Iowa, was issued the first American patent for a carousel. To commemorate this milestone, July 25 was declared National Merry-Go-Round Day (a.k.a: National Carousel Day) in 2014 by the National Carousel Association (NCA), an organization focused on preserving historic carousels primarily in the United States and Canada.

The American carousel industry was developed by European immigrants, notably Danish immigrant Charles I. D. Looff, German immigrant Gustav Dentzel, and Scottish immigrant Allan Herschell. During the late 19th century, several carousel construction centers formed in the United States, each with their own style:

- Coney Island style – characterized by elaborate and sometimes faux-jeweled saddles, as well as mirrors to catch and reflect lights. This style was pioneered by Looff in Brooklyn, New York City.
- Philadelphia style – known for more realistically painted saddles, this style was pioneered by Dentzel and the Philadelphia Toboggan Company.
- Country Fair style – often with no saddles at all, this style was pioneered by Allan Herschell and Edward Spillman of North Tonawanda, New York (near Buffalo), and Charles W. Parker of Kansas.
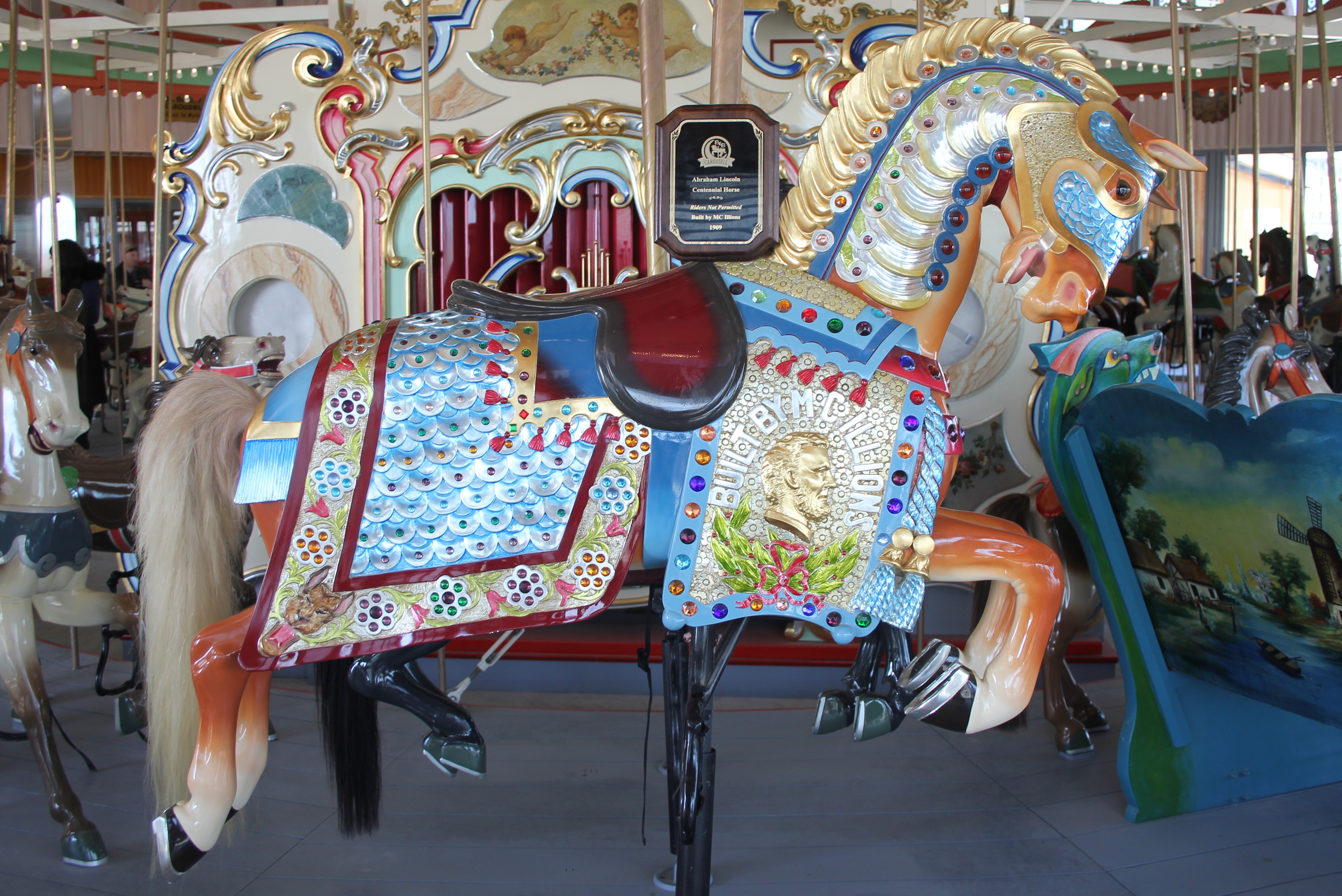
1909 carousel horse by Marcus Illions, a Looff protégé, in the Coney Island style

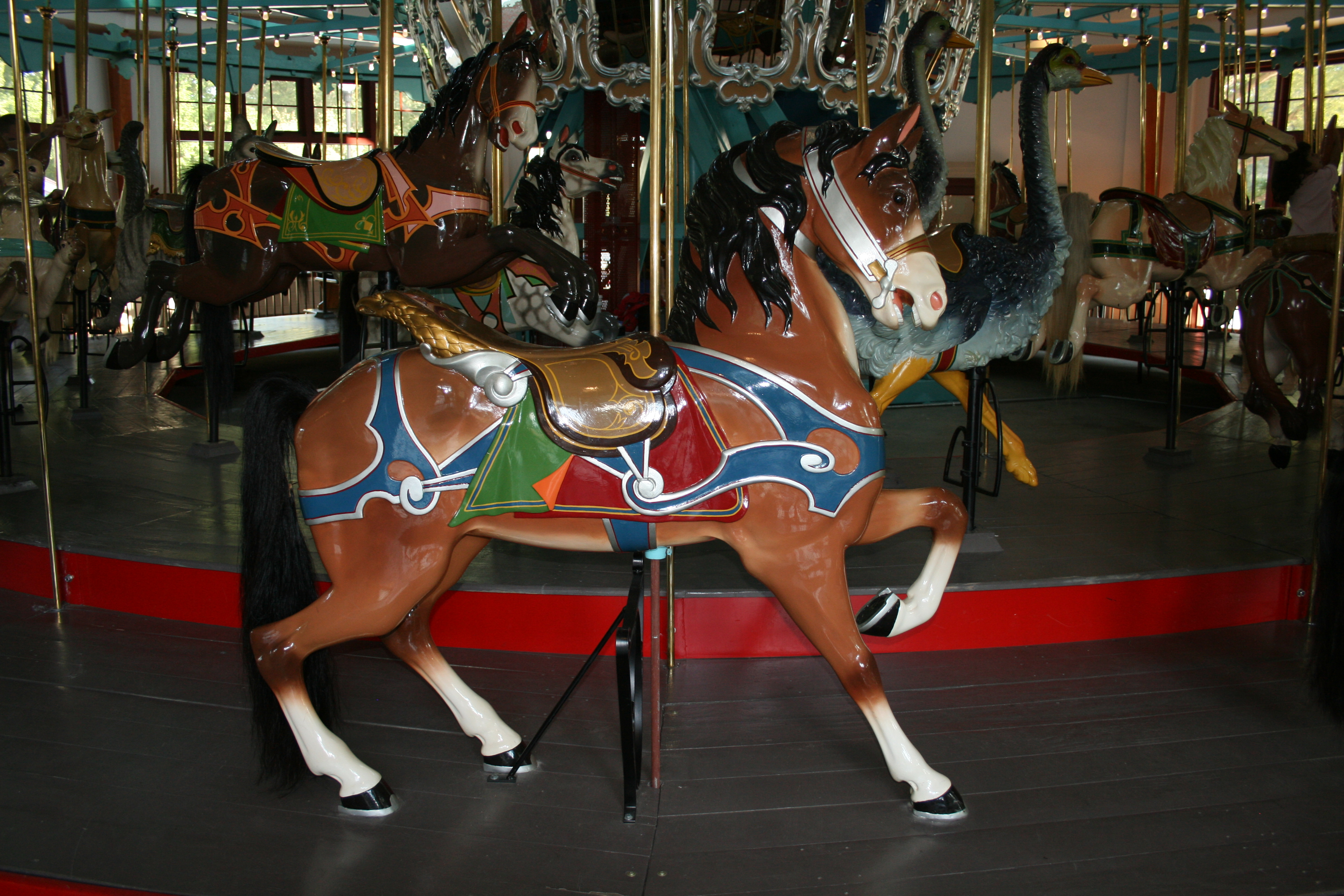
1900 carousel horse by Salvatore Cernigliaro for Dentzel in the Philadelphia style

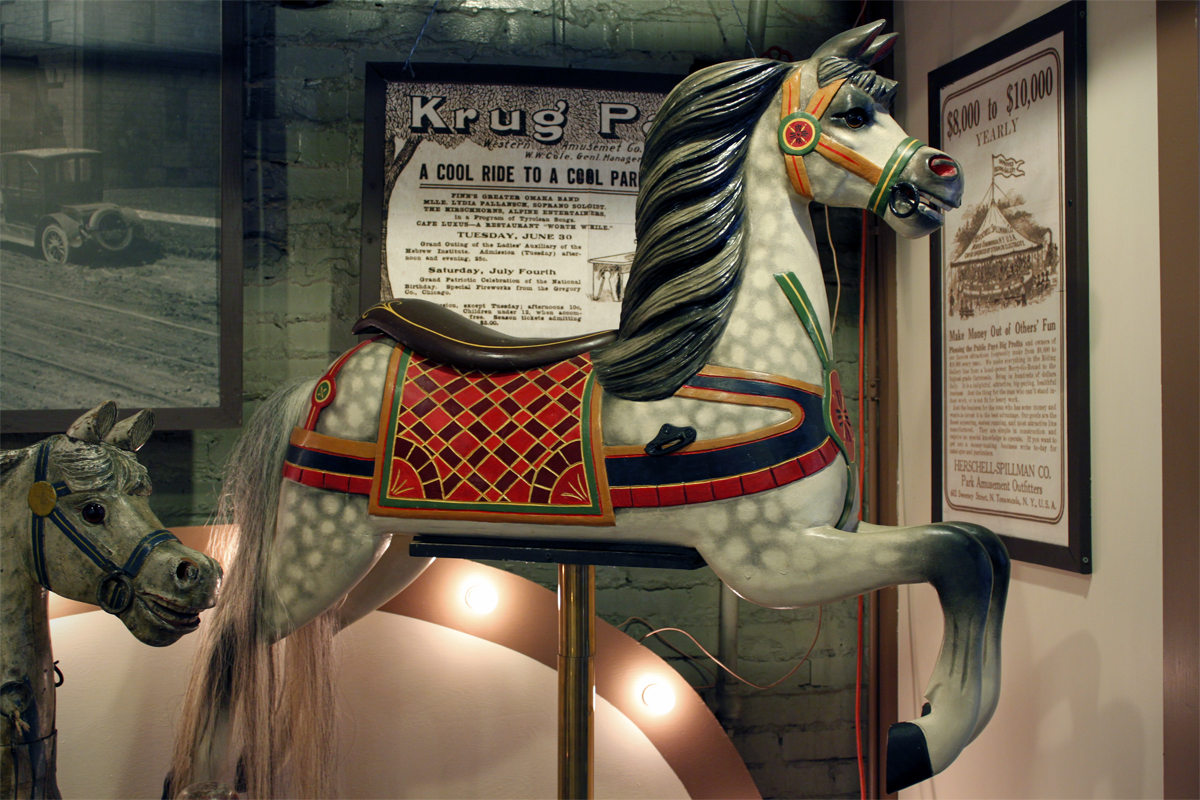
Carousel horse by the Allan Herschell Company in the Country Fair style

=== 20th century ===
During the Great Depression, the production of wooden carousel figures was phased out and were replaced by more durable, mass-produced aluminum castings. These were in turn discontinued in favor of cheaper and lighter fiberglass castings later in the 20th century.

== Carousels today ==
Thousands of hand-painted, wood-carved carousels (possibly as many as 10,000) were built during their golden age from the 1870s to the early 1930s; less than 200 complete units exist today. Mechanical band organs that provided music, and brass ring dispensers that encouraged riders to sit on the outermost (often stationary) row, were common features for carousels during their golden age, but are now very rare. Carousels are manufactured and operated throughout the world today and are often used as symbols for all amusement rides, and the amusement industry as a whole, exemplified by the carousel horse logo used by the International Association of Amusement Parks and Attractions (IAAPA) until 2018. Several notable extant carousels are recipients of the NCA's Historic Carousel Award.

=== Notable extant carousels built before 1870 ===
Name	Location	Country	Image	Builder	Year	Working band organ	Brass ring dispenser	Notes	References
Hanau Carousel	Hanau-Wilhelmsbad State Park, Hanau, Hesse	Germany			1780	Yes	No	The oldest standing and operational carousel in the world. It was built in 1780 in Hanau and has four chariots and twelve stationary horses. The horses and coaches date from 1896. In 1970, twelve of the 16 wooden horses were stolen. It was fully restored in 2016.	
Vermolen Boden-Karussel	Efteling, Kaatsheuvel, North Brabant	Netherlands			1865	Yes	No	The oldest operational carousel in the world prior to the 2016 restoration of the Hanau Carousel in Germany (see above). The 'Vermolen Boden Carousel' in Efteling dates back to 1865. It was originally turned by horses. At present it is turned by an electric motor. Not to be confused with the Stoomcarrousel (built c. 1895–1903), also located in Efteling.	

=== Notable extant carousels built 1870–1939 ===
Name	Location	Country	Image	Builder	Year	Working band organ	Brass ring dispenser	Notes	References
Flying Horses Carousel	Oak Bluffs, Massachusetts	United States		Charles Dare	1876	Yes	Yes	Oldest platform carousel in the United States. Designated by a National Historic Landmark by the United States Department of the Interior. One of only two Dare carousels still in existence. Originally operated at an amusement park in Coney Island, New York, it was moved to Oak Bluffs in 1884. The carousel was acquired by the Martha's Vineyard Preservation Trust in 1986 to prevent it from being dismantled and sold piecemeal to collectors of antique carved horses.	
Flying Horse Carousel	Westerly, Rhode Island	United States		Charles W. F. Dare Company	c. 1876	No	Yes	Built in 1876 and listed as a National Historic Landmark. It is one of two Charles Dare carousels in existence. It is considered the oldest of its type "in which the horses are suspended from a center frame," as opposed to being mounted on a wooden platform, which causes the horses to "fly" as the carousel gains speed.	
Melbourne Zoo Carousel	Royal Melbourne Zoological Gardens, Melbourne, Victoria	Australia		Robert Tidman & Sons	1878			Built in 1878 in England and imported to Australia in the 1880s by John Briggs. The carousel traveled the show circuit until 1963, when it finally arrived at Melbourne Zoo. Restoration completed 2005.	
Darling Harbour Carousel	Tumbalong Park, Sydney, New South Wales	Australia		G. & J. Lines & Company	c. 1885	Yes	No	A New South Wales Heritage listed attraction. It is an example of an old Edwardian Carousel which are very rare nowadays. It is operated by a classic steam engine which has been retained. The Carousel dates back to the 'Golden Age' of Carousels between the 1890s to the 1920s. First imported to Australia in 1894.	
Le Galopant	La Ronde, Montreal	Canada		Belgian craftsmen	1885	No	No	The oldest galloping carousel in the world. Built in 1885 in Bressoux by Belgian craftsmen, it stayed there until 1964, when it moved to New York for their World's Fair. For Expo 67 it came to Montreal as part of the rides featured in La Ronde. In 2003, the Carousel underwent a meticulous restoration under then-current park ownership, Six Flags. More than $1 million was spent to refurbish the ride, which reopened in a new specially landscaped garden in 2007. The carousel was retired by the park in 2019 and left to deteriorate outdoors.	
Letná Carousel	Letná Park, Prague	(Czech Republic) Czechia		Josef Nebeský	1892	Yes	No	One of the oldest preserved carousels in Europe. Has been renovated recently (2022). The carousel is still located in the original wooden pavilion and the interior is furnished in its almost original form from 1892. It features 21 horses covered with real horse skin and four cars.	
Geelong Carousel	Geelong Waterfront, Victoria	Australia		Armitage–Herschell	1892	Yes	No	Built in New York in c. 1892. It saw a period of service in New York before being shipped to Australia in the 1920s. It was operated as an amusement ride in the seaside town of Mordialloc, Victoria from c. 1920 to c. 1950. The carousel was eventually dismantled and stored in a field at Echuca, Victoria. It was then sold at auction and stored at Castlemaine. With assistance from the State Government of Victoria, the City of Greater Geelong purchased the carousel and funded its restoration, as part of the redevelopment of the Geelong Waterfront. The restored carousel was officially opened in its new pavilion on 14 October 2000.	
Karuselli	Linnanmäki, Helsinki, Uusimaa	Finland		Friedrich Heyn	1896	Yes	No	Oldest amusement ride in Linnanmäki	
Forest Park Carousel	Queens, New York, New York	United States		D.C. Muller & Brother Company	1903	Yes	No	One of only two surviving Muller brothers carousels, it was listed on the National Register of Historic Places in 2004.	
Lakeside Park Carousel	Lakeside Park, Port Dalhousie, Ontario	Canada	Lakeside Park Carousel in 2019	Kremer's Carousel Works	1905	Yes	No	Brought to St. Catharines in 1921. It continues to provide amusement for young and old alike, at just 5 cents a ride.	
Carousel El Dorado	In storage (2020–present); Toshimaen, Tokyo (1971–2020); Steeplechase Park, New York (1911–1964)	Japan		Hugo Haase	1907	No	No	Mechanical Engineering Heritage (Japan) No. 38	
Eden Palladium	Europa-Park Confertainment Center, Rust, Baden-Württemberg	Germany		Gustave Bayol	1909	Yes	No	One of only four salon carousels that still exist	
Santa Cruz Looff Carousel	Santa Cruz Beach Boardwalk, Santa Cruz, California	United States		Charles I. D. Looff	1911	Yes	Yes	One of the few carousels still in its original location for more than 100 years. It is a "pure carousel" meaning all of the horses were provided by the same company that built the carousel. It is also one of the few with the rare combination of a working ring dispenser and outside row jumping horses. The carousel features three band organs including a rare Ruth & Sohn 96-key organ with 342 pipes. The Looff carousel was designated a national historic landmark in 1987.	
C. W. Parker Carousel No. 119	Burnaby Village Museum, Burnaby, British Columbia	Canada		C. W. Parker	1912	Yes	No	Originally equipped with a steam engine. Sold to Burnaby Village Museum in 1989.	
Merry-Go-Round Steam Gallopers	Hollycombe Steam Collection, Liphook, England	United Kingdom		Robert Tidman & Sons	1912	Yes	No	A working steam driven Merry-Go-Round with 3-abreast Steam Gallopers. It has 24 horses, six cockerels and two chariots (for those who don't relish the galloping motion). It is driven by a steam center engine, also Tidman, and has revolving pillars, which are believed to be the only ones still operating. Musical accompaniment is driven by a slotted card Tidman band organ.	
Nunley's Carousel	Cradle of Aviation Museum, Garden City, New York	United States		Stein & Goldstein Artistic Carousell Manufacturing Company	1912	Yes	Yes	Operated at Nunley's Amusement Park in Baldwin, New York, until its closure in 1995. Subsequently purchased by Nassau County and placed in storage. Fully restored and opened in its current location in 2009.	
Cafesjian's Carousel	Como Park, Saint Paul, Minnesota	United States		Philadelphia Toboggan Company	1914	Yes	No	A mainstay at the Minnesota State Fair from 1914 to 1988, when it was saved from the auction block by a non-profit group organized to save the landmark. The carousel is now located in Como Park in Saint Paul, Minnesota.	
Weona Park Carousel	Pen Argyl, Pennsylvania	United States		Dentzel Carousel Company	1917	No	Yes	One of only two remaining stationary Dentzel menagerie carousels with original factory paint on the carousel figures	
Cedar Downs Racing Derby	Cedar Point, Sandusky, Ohio	United States		Prior & Church	1922	No	No	One of only two operational racing carousels in the United States	
Over-the-Jumps Carousel	Little Rock Zoo, Little Rock, Arkansas	United States		Spillman Engineering Company	1924	No	No	Only carousel in the world that rides in a waving motion, only remaining wooden track carousel built by the Herschell–Spillman Company, and one of only four track carousels still in existence	
George W. Johnson Park Carousel	George W. Johnson Park, Endicott, New York	United States		Allan Herschell Company	1934	No	No	This carousel is one of six in the Greater Binghamton area donated by George F. Johnson, owner of the Endicott-Johnson Company early in the 20th century. These carousels, all manufactured by the Allan Herschell Company in the "country fair" style, were donated with the express stipulation that they would never charge admission for anyone to ride them.	

=== Notable extant carousels built 1940–present ===
Name	Location	Country	Image	Builder	Year	Working band organ	Brass ring dispenser	Notes	References
Carousel Columbia	California's Great America, Santa Clara, California	United States		Chance Manufacturing	1976	No	No	Double-decker carousel. Tallest carousel in the world at 101 feet (31 m). The nearly identical Columbia Carousel in Six Flags Great America in Gurnee, Illinois, is 1 foot (30 cm) shorter.	
Richland Carrousel Park	Mansfield, Ohio	United States		The Carousel Works	1991	Yes	No	First new hand-carved wooden carousel built and operating in the United States since the 1930s	
Pferdekarussell	Phantasialand, Brühl, North Rhine-Westphalia	Germany		Preston & Barbieri	1998	No	No	Largest double-decker carousel in Europe	
Le Manège d'Andrea	Nantes, Pays de la Loire	France		La Machine	1999	No	No	Riders can control some of the movements of the carousel figures.	
Pride of Canada Carousel	Markham, Ontario	Canada		Brass Ring Carousel Company/Patrick Amiot	2016	No	No	Made entirely from scrap metal	

== In popular culture ==
The House on the Rock carousel in Wisconsin is a non-ridable art piece billed as the world's largest indoor carousel.

- The protagonist in the 1945 Broadway musical Carousel is a carousel barker.
- In the climactic scene of Alfred Hitchcock's 1951 film Strangers on a Train, the protagonist and antagonist struggle on a carousel.
- In the 1963 film Charade, there is a scene near its ending in which a carousel appears in the background with the main theme's music.
- In the 1964 Mary Poppins, Mary, Bert, and the two Banks children ride a carousel, whose carousel horses float off the platform and lead the riding characters to a fox hunt and horse race that Mary wins.
- The children's television program The Magic Roundabout, which aired from 1965 to 1977, uses a carousel as its central motif.
- The 1973 film The Sting features a large indoor carousel adjacent a brothel; the brothel's madam allows the prostitutes to ride it on slow nights.
- The House on the Rock carousel near Spring Green, Wisconsin, a rotating, display-only art piece built in 1981, has 269 carousel figures and is billed as the largest indoor carousel in the world.
- David Carradine's 1983 film Americana revolves around a Vietnam War veteran's obsession with the restoration of an abandoned carousel.
- In the 1983 film Something Wicked This Way Comes, a carousel makes its riders younger by one year each time it completes a backwards revolution.
- The children's television program Playdays had a carousel maintained by Mr. Jolly named Rosie, who was the focus of episodes broadcast from 1992 to 1997.
- In the 2011 Australian children's picture book The Carousel by Ursula Dubosarsky, after a carousel ride, a child has a semi-mystical vision of the carousel horses breaking free from the wheel and galloping across the world.
- In 2014, American singer-songwriter Melanie Martinez released the song "Carousel," using the word carousel as a metaphor for love that goes in circles endlessly.
- One of the most popular scenes from the HBO series Euphoria features one of the main characters, Cassie Howard, experiencing an orgasm on a carousel in a carnival
- The three installments of the book series Kingdom Keepers: The Return by Ridley Pearson, published between 2015 and 2017, feature the carousel from Disneyland used as a time machine to arrive at the opening of Disneyland.
- The second song on Travis Scott's 2018 album Astroworld is named "Carousel."

== See also ==
- Amusement rides on the National Register of Historic Places
- Disney carousels
- Perron family

== Bibliography ==
- Hinds, Anne Dion (1990). Grab the Brass Ring: the American Carousel (1st ed.). Crown Publishers, Inc. ISBN 0-517-57486-1.
- Leonhard, Karl Cäsar von (1854). Aus unserer Zeit in meinem Leben, Volume 1 (in German). E. Schweizerbart Publishing and Printing House.
