= Chippewa Park =

Park in Thunder Bay, Ontario, Canada

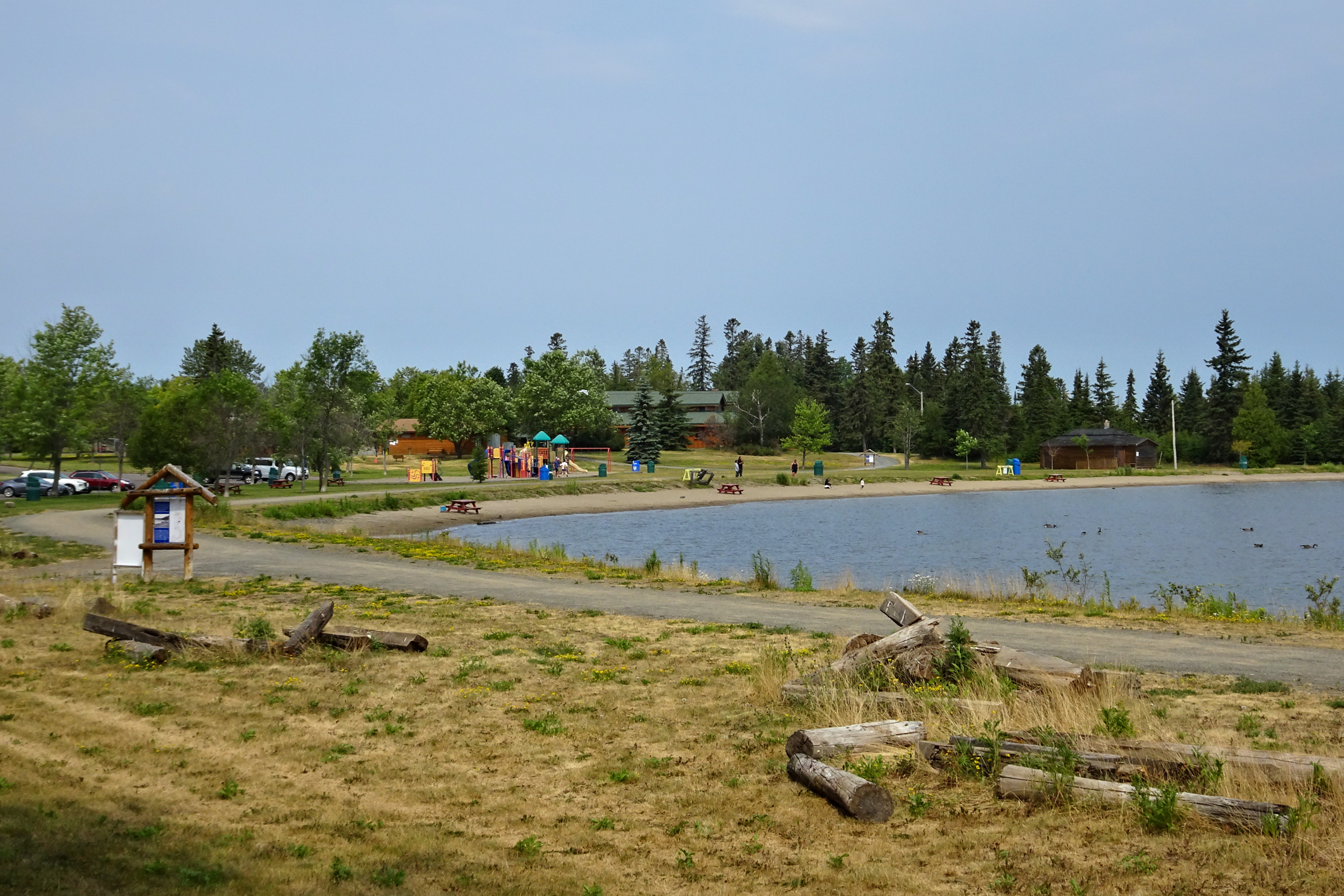
- Interactive map of Chippewa Park
- Type: Protected Area and Public Park
- Location: Thunder Bay, Ontario, Canada
- Coordinates: 48°20′00″N 89°12′40″W
- Area: 1.09 km² (270 acres)
- Created: 1921
- Operator: City of Thunder Bay - Parks and Recreation

Chippewa Park is located on the shore of Lake Superior, south of Thunder Bay, Ontario, Canada. From May Long Weekend to Labour Day Weekend (Canadian dates) the park operates a children's amusement park which features a C. W. Parker carousel that was built between 1918 and 1920. There was also a wildlife park that was home to a number of animals native to Northwestern Ontario. The zoo was closed to the public in 2017. There is a public beach and views of the "Sleeping Giant". Chippewa Park also has cabin accommodation, RV sites and tenting sites.

== Carousel ==
The Chippewa Park Carousel was built between 1918 and 1920 by the C.W. Parker Carnival and Supply Co., and bought by the Fort William Parks Board in 1934. It is one of very few intact surviving carousels of its style, featuring hand-carved wooden horses and decorations. The Carousel was designated under the Ontario Heritage Act in 1991.

After nearly a century of use, plans were developed by the Friends of Chippewa Park in 2016 to restore and rehabilitate the carousel. The work was funded from grants and community donations, and the carousel began running again in June 2022. As of 2025, there are plans to build an enclosure to further protect the carousel and to allow it to operate year-round.

== Zoo ==
The zoo at Chippewa Park was established in 1923, featuring at that time a squirrel and a raccoon. Generally animals kept at Chippewa Park were those native to the area. Major renovations to the zoo were carried out in 1953 and 1974. The zoo was permanently closed in 2017. Many of the animals still in exhibits at the time were transferred to other facilities, while others continued to be fed and cared by City staff. Since December 1, 2022, the former zoo facility has been home to Thunderbird Wildlife Rescue.

== Current activities ==
Chippewa Park is currently a public park maintained by the City of Thunder Bay, with a public beach, cabin accommodation, and RV and tent sites. Amusement rides, including the restored carousel, are open during summer months, as are concessions. The Pavilion, constructed in the 1920s, is available for rentals.

The Park is regularly the site of events such as the Thunder Bay Kite Festival.
