= Deer Lake (British Columbia) =

Lake in British Columbia, Canada

- Aerial view of Deer Lake in 2026

- Location in Metro Vancouver
- Location: Burnaby, British Columbia
- Coordinates: 49.236655°N 122.977395°W
- Basin countries: Canada

Deer Lake is a lake in central Burnaby, British Columbia, Canada. It is home to a wide variety of flora and fauna and features a number of walking trails. These trails connect the lake and its surrounding forests and fields to a number of amenities, including a boat launch, picnic sites, a playground, washrooms, the Burnaby Art Gallery, Shadbolt Centre for the Arts, Burnaby Village Museum, and Century Gardens, as well as the surrounding community and long trails for walking.

Artist residencies are operated by the City of Burnaby out of heritage properties on and near the lake.

== Culture ==
The north side of Deer Lake Park, with Deer Lake at its centre, is home to several municipally run arts and culture destinations. The Burnaby Art Gallery, housed within Fairacres Mansion, exhibits historical and contemporary art and cares for the City of Burnaby Permanent Art Collection. The Shadbolt Centre for the Arts is a multi-purpose community arts facility providing public exhibits, performances, festivals, and arts classes year-round. Major concerts and festivals are held in the park immediately south of Shadbolt Centre. Burnaby Village Museum contains a combination of heritage and replica buildings depicting life in the region in the 1920s, and includes the vintage C. W. Parker Carousel.

There are several works of public art in the park, including sculpture by Thomas Cannell, Bodo Pfeifer, Nathan Lee, and Keith Rice-Jones.

== Activities ==
Deer Lake Boat Rentals offers canoe, kayak, pedal boat, and rowboat rentals to the public during the summer months. Gas or electric motors are not allowed on this lake.

== History ==
Deer Lake Boat Rentals

Deer Lake lily on July, 2008

Deer Lake and the surrounding park is a highly altered habitat. The vegetation natural to the area is temperate rainforest dominated by conifers such as Tsuga heterophylla, Pseudotsuga menziesii, and Thuja plicata. Most of this forest, whose trees were considered particularly tall for the Lower Mainland, was logged in the first few years of the 20th century. While rainbow trout, sculpin, and crayfish were likely native to Deer Lake, most of the aquatic animals are introduced species. These invasive species include bullfrog, ictalurid catfish and carp.

The Legend of Deer Lake, as told by E. Pauline Johnson, is a Coast Salish tale about a hidden waterway between False Creek and Deer Lake. It was discovered by the first chief Capilano, who speared a king harbour seal in False Creek with his elk antler spear with western red cedar line. The seal escaped through a hidden underground creek, and he spent months looking for it by the shore. One day he was beckoned inland by what turned out to be the flames of a forest fire. On the shore of Deer Lake he found the remains of the seal and recovered his spear, and with it, his prowess as a hunter.

Today there is a condominium development overlooking the lake near where Oakalla Prison, a maximum security prison farm, once existed.

Deer Lake School (K-12) located nearby and is named for the lake.

== See also ==
- List of lakes of British Columbia
