= C. W. Parker =

American carousel manufacturer (1864–1932)

Charles Wallace Parker (1864–1932), was an American manufacturer of carousels (merry-go-rounds). He was self-titled the "Amusement King". He also called himself "Colonel Parker" although he never served in the military.

== Early life ==
Parker was born in 1864 in Griggsville, Illinois; the family moved to Abilene, Kansas in 1869.

Parker's first venture into the amusement business was purchasing a traveling shooting gallery, a type of carnival game. After touring the area with the gallery, he constructed one of his own, improved, design.

== C. W. Parker Amusement Company ==
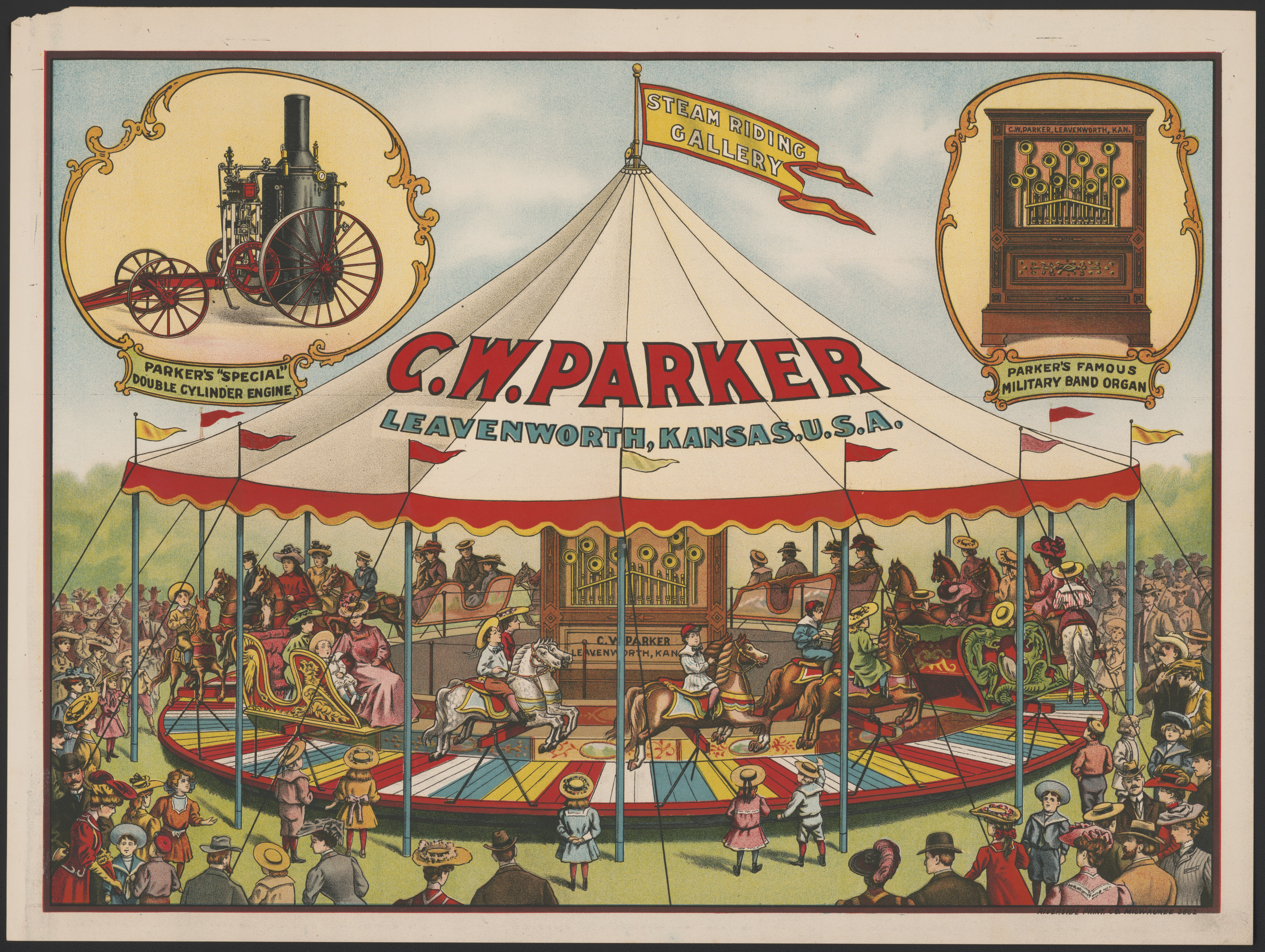
1910 poster advertising C.W. Parker's steam engine, band organ, and track carousel

Parker bought his first carousel, an Armitage–Herschell Company track-style machine in 1892. After operating this machine for two years, he built his own machine and started the Parker Carnival Supply Company in Abilene. He began manufacturing jumping carousels, first powered by steam, and later by electricity. The carving on the wooden carousel horses became increasingly elaborate.

The company was renamed the C. W. Parker Amusement Company in 1896. The company also built shooting galleries and Ferris wheels, but its primary business was the production of carousels.

By 1905, Parker was running four full-sized traveling carnivals. In 1911, he moved his company to a bigger factory in Leavenworth, Kansas. He built hundreds of traveling carousels (known as "Carry-Us-Alls") for the carnival circuit, as well as four or five "Superior Park Model" carousels for permanent installation in amusement parks. The Jantzen Beach Carousel ("Superior Park Model #2") in Oregon is the only one of these still in existence. C.W. Parker personally supervised the installation of the carousel at Jantzen Beach Amusement Park in 1928.

Around 1925, the company started producing carousels with aluminum horses rather than wood.

The C. W. Parker Amusement Company produced approximately 1,000 carousels.

== Legacy ==
C. W.'s son, Paul Parker, also manufactured carousels, running the company from 1930 to 1955.

The C.W. Parker Carousel Museum in Leavenworth features a 1912 Parker carousel (#118) and a Parker metal carousel (#834).

In 2019, a 1930s Parker carousel (#600) formerly located at Roaring Rapids Pizza in Eugene, Oregon, was donated to the now-defunct International Museum of Carousel Art owned by the Perron family.

== See also ==
- Lander Park Carousel, built c. 1898–1901, located in Abilene
- City of Waterloo Carousel, a 1911 Parker two-row portable carousel (#53)
- Pueblo City Park Carousel, built in 1911 (#72)
- Crossroads Village (Michigan), site of a Parker Ferris wheel and 1912 Parker carousel (#108/#234/#332)
- C. W. Parker Carousel No. 119, built in 1912, located in Burnaby, British Columbia, Canada
- Chippewa Park, site of a c. 1917–1921 Parker carousel
- C. W. Parker Carousel No. 825, built in 1950, located in Faulkton, South Dakota, United States
