= Gary Lee-Nova =

- Born: Gary Nairn; June 26, 1943 (age 83); Toronto, Ontario, Canada
- Education: Vancouver School of Art (now Emily Carr University) (1960–1961), (1962–63) and at Coventry College, England (1961–1962)
- Known for: Painter, sculptor, filmmaker, multimedia artist; at Emily Carr University of Art and Design, Vancouver, Chairperson Interdisciplinary Studies Division (1984–1988), lecturer in linguistics, semiotics and media history for 7 years and an instructor in Drawing and Computer Applications for about 25 years (retired 2008)

Gary Lee-Nova (June 26, 1943), born Gary Nairn, is a Canadian painter, printmaker, sculptor, and filmmaker.

== Biography ==
Lee-Nova was born in Toronto, Ontario; his father was an air force bombardier and navigator, his mother was a teacher.

In his early art career, Lee-Nova spent 15 months in England as a student at Coventry College (1961–1962) and was introduced by his fellow students and teachers to a wider vision of art-making than was available at art school in Canada at the time.

As an adolescent and young adult, Lee-Nova had several hero figures, both writers: the American William S. Burroughs, and the Canadian Marshall McLuhan. He has studied, collected, and corresponded with Burroughs, and sometimes also carried Burroughsian thinking in new directions in his art-making, Lee-Nova has said. McLuhan's words about electronic media also made him an enthusiast of the computer in his art. He has also said that his thinking about art was aided by the use of hallucinogenic drugs as well as by what he calls philosophies such as Zen Buddhism that were becoming popular in the 1950s.

Early in his exhibition history, Lee-Nova held a joint show in Vancouver with Claude Breeze who assisted him in his development. He started making films in 1965 and produced Steel Mushrooms in 1967 in collaboration with Dallas Selman. In 1967, he showed paintings and drawings in Toronto at the Carmen Lamanna Gallery and received praise from critic (and Vancouver Art Gallery director (1963–1967)) Richard Simmins who said he was the most promising painter from the west coast he had seen in recent years. In 1968, he showed at the Vancouver Art Gallery with Michael Morris Prisma: an environment, described by reviewer Marguerite Pinney as a strange and curious summer house with programmed light, music and colour.

In Vancouver, he was a co-founder of the Image Bank (with Michael Morris and Vincent Trasov) and active in the Sound Gallery (circa 1965) and Intermedia (1967–1972). He also worked with the spectrum as a motif and thereby began the Image Bank's Colour Bar Research project. In addition, Lee-Nova was involved with the New York Corres-Sponge Dance School of Vancouver, and worked under the fictitious name of Artimus Rat or Art Rat. The artist also performed Art Rat as a mascot character with a rodent mask that covered his entire head. The mask was created with the assistance of artist Kate Craig.

Lee-Nova continued to be a key figure on the West Coast Scene in the early 1970s, working with electronic media and film as well as painting and printmaking. He continued to work on projects that might take years to execute, or be created with other artists. For instance, his Out to Metric (1975) in the Vancouver Art Gallery collection, was made in collaboration with artist Alan Miller. It was created at the time the metric system was replacing the Imperial system of measurement in Canada and mocks the change that was occurring in the language about measurement through its construction. It used about 1400 yardsticks made into a partial room eight feet high. Lee-Nova said about the work:

"The work is an expression of an aspect of the nature of language. I regard a system of measurement as a language system.

Lee-Nova's work has been exhibited at galleries such as the Vancouver Art Gallery, Bau-Xi Gallery (Toronto), University of Saskatchewan, the Western Front, the Morris and Helen Belkin Art Gallery, the Burnaby Art Gallery, the National Gallery of Canada, the Demarco Gallery (Edinburgh) and the Paris Biennale. His papers are in the Gary Lee-Nova Fonds, Morris and Helen Belkin Art Gallery, Vancouver. In 2021 the Burnaby Art Gallery held a survey exhibition titled Gary Lee-Nova: Oblique Trajectories of his work, accompanied by a publication.

He has been a teacher at the Emily Carr University of Art and Design, Vancouver, Chairperson Interdisciplinary Studies Division (1984–1988), lecturer in linguistics, semiotics and media history for 7 years and an instructor in Drawing and Computer Applications for about 25 years (retired 2008). In 2018 he received the title Professor Emeritus.

== Selected public collections ==
- Agnes Etherington Art Centre, Kingston
- Canada Council Art Bank, Ottawa
- Institute of Contemporary Arts (ICA), London, England
- Museum London, Ontario
- National Gallery of Canada, Ottawa
- The Robert McLaughlin Gallery, Oshawa
- Vancouver Art Gallery
- Burnaby Art Gallery
