= City of Waterloo Carousel =

- U.S. National Register of Historic Places
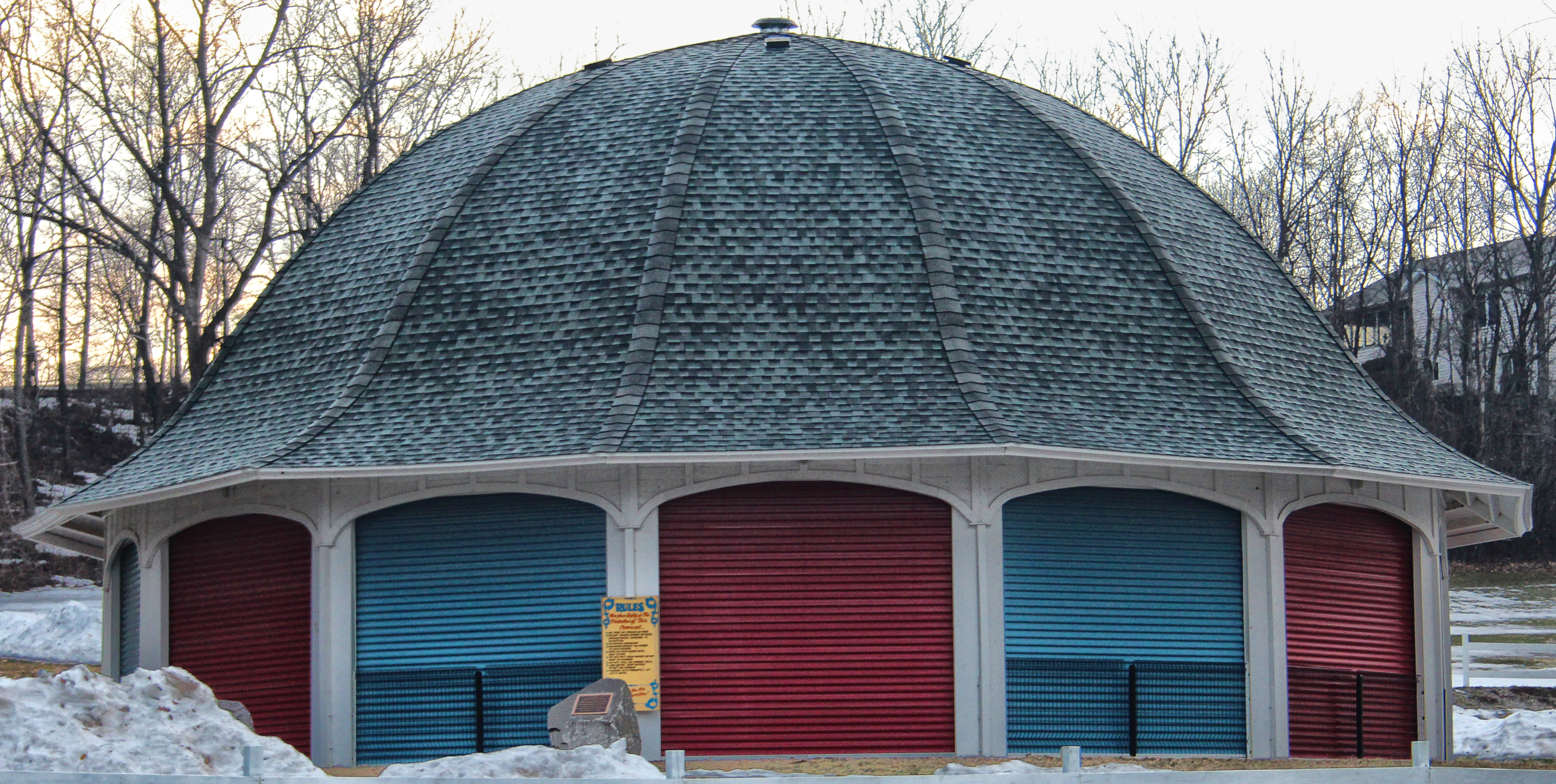
- City of Waterloo Carousel
- Location: 500 Park Avenue, Waterloo, Wisconsin
- Coordinates: 43°10′49″N 88°59′05″W
- Area: 1 acre (0.40 ha)
- Built: 1911
- NRHP reference No.: 97000890
- Added to NRHP: August 15, 1997

The City of Waterloo Carousel is located in Waterloo, Wisconsin.

== History ==
The carousel was built by the C.W. Parker Amusement Company. It was owned by the Curtis Brother Carnival based out of Cuba City, Wisconsin until 1925 when it was purchased by the City of Waterloo. After arriving in Waterloo, the carousel was placed in Fireman's Park. It remains in the park, though it has been moved to a different location within it after it was damaged from flooding. The carousel was added to the State and the National Register of Historic Places in 1997.

== See also ==
- Amusement rides on the National Register of Historic Places
