= Sherbrooke Museum of Fine Arts =

- Musée des beaux-arts de Sherbrooke
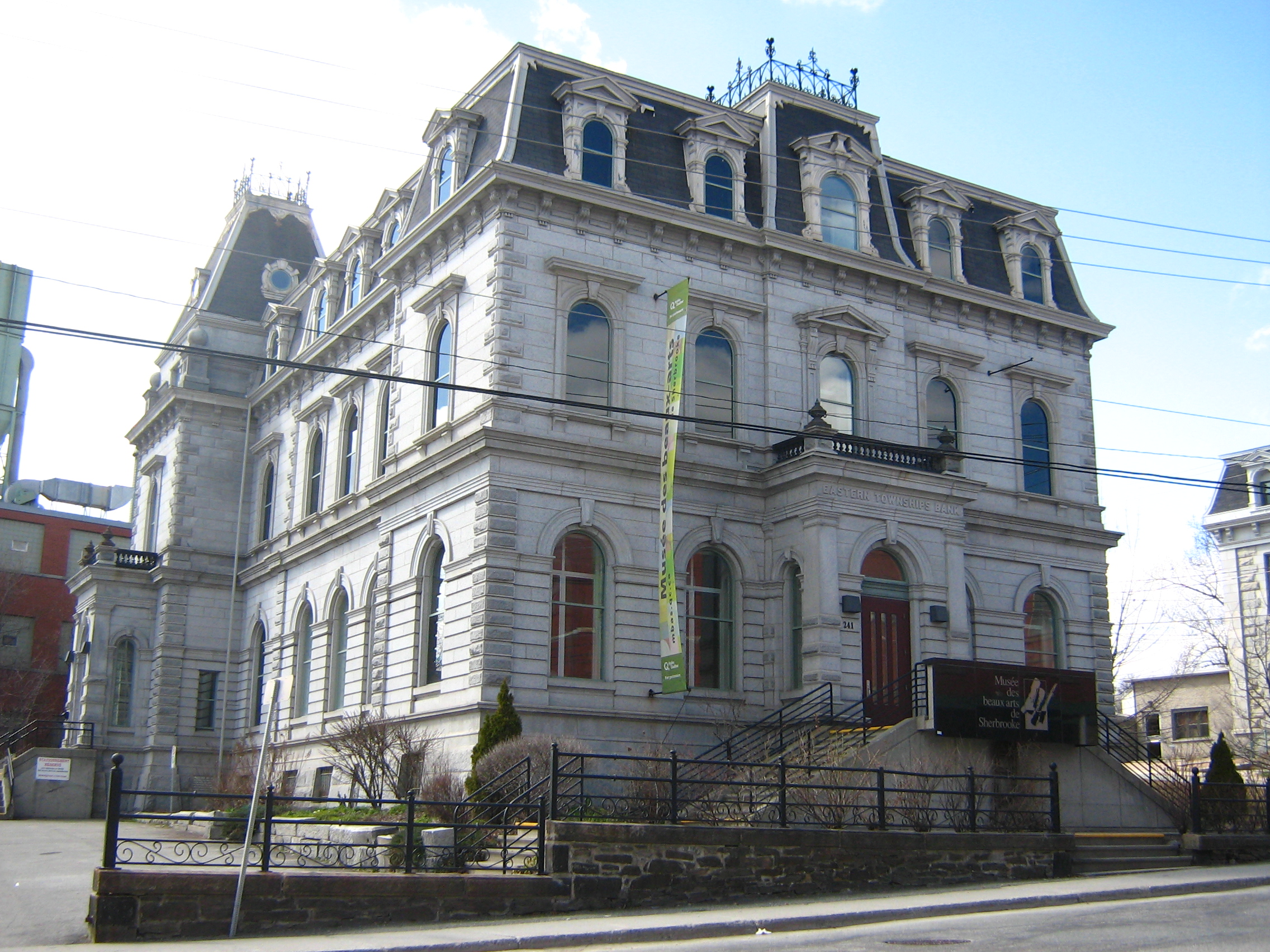
- The Sherbrooke Museum of Fine Arts located within the former Eastern Townships Bank
- Established: 1982
- Location: 241, rue Dufferin; Sherbrooke, Quebec; J1H 4M3
- Coordinates: 45.4051°N 71.8947°W
- Type: Art museum
- Collection size: 4,600
- Director: Cécile Gélinas
- Curator: Sarah Boucher
- Website: mbas.qc.ca/en

The Sherbrooke Museum of Fine Arts (French: Musée des beaux-arts de Sherbrooke) is an art museum in Sherbrooke, Quebec, Canada. It is located at 241 Dufferin Street in downtown Sherbrooke.

The museum receives funding from the City of Sherbrooke, the Quebec Ministry of Culture and Communications and from its members.

== History ==
The Sherbrooke Museum of Fine Arts was founded in 1982 by local art lovers. It is the main institution in the Estrie region for the display and conservation of art. It was accredited by the Quebec Ministry of Culture and Communications in March 1990. In 1996, it relocated to the former head office of the Eastern Townships Bank, a building constructed in 1876. The building was completely renovated to convert it into a museum.

== Collection and exhibits ==
The Sherbrooke Museum of Fine Arts has over 4,600 works in its collection.

There are three rooms in the museum, one on each floor of the building. On the third floor is a permanent exhibit entitled "Spaces and Landscapes", and is dedicated to the work of Frederick Simpson Coburn as well as a contemporary art collection donated by Luc LaRochelle.

The other two rooms present ten temporary exhibits per year. The works at the museum consist of works by local artists from the Eastern Townships region, works inspired by the Eastern Townships, and national and international native art.
