= Terrance Houle =

Canadian artist of Native American descent

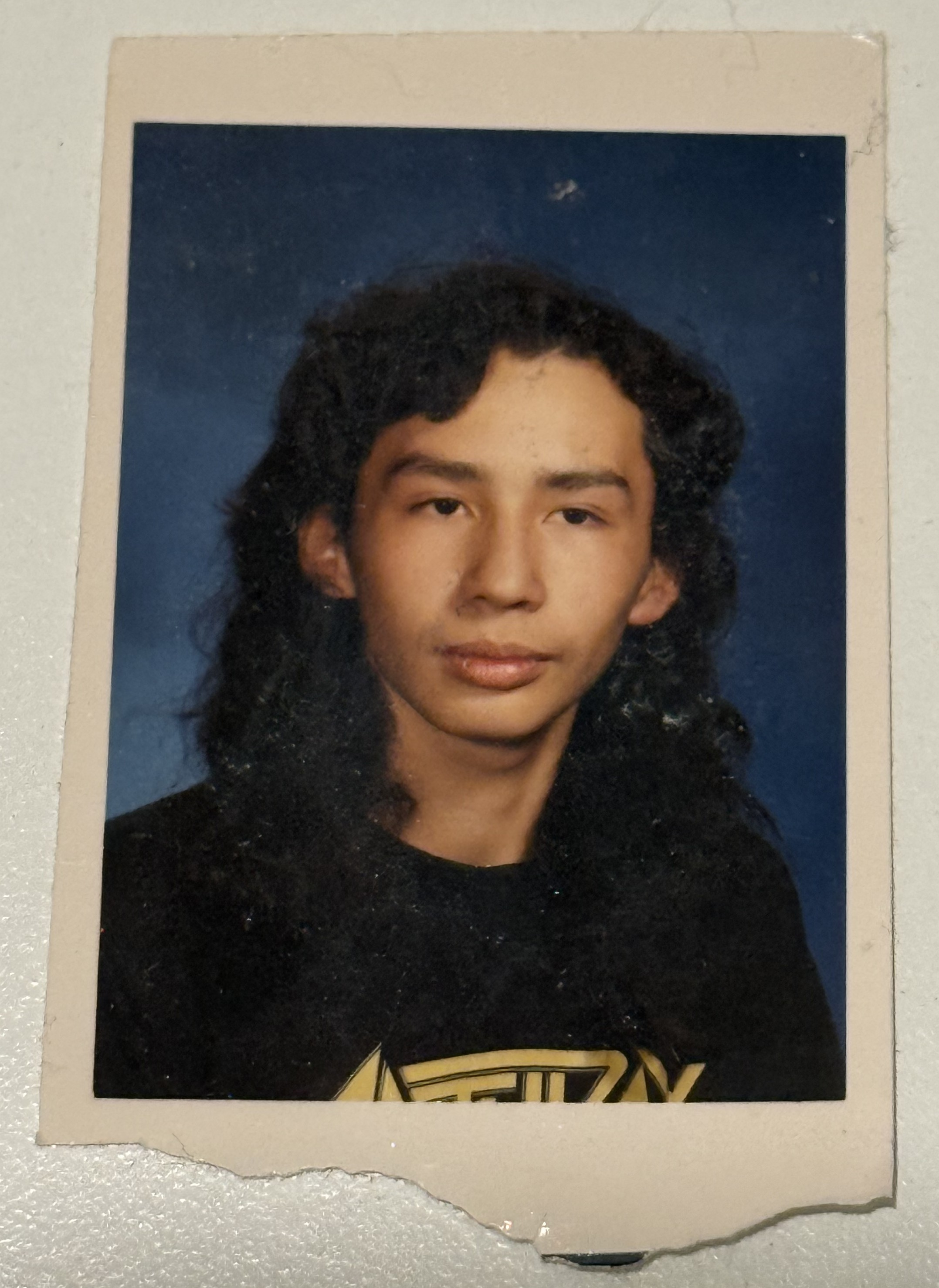
Happy Birthday, portrait of the artist

Terrance James Houle (born 1975) is an internationally recognized Canadian interdisciplinary artist and member of the Kainai Nation with ancestry from the Sandy Bay First Nation in Manitoba. His mother is Maxine WeaselFat from the Kainai Nation, and his father is Donald Vernon Houle from the Sandy Bay First Nation and a member of the Canadian Aboriginal Veterans. His parents are 3rd-generation residential school survivors. They reside on the Kainai Nation reserve in Alberta, Canada. Houle is based in Calgary, Alberta.

Houle has created art in multiple media, including photography, painting, installation, performance, music, video, and film. The subject and themes of his art range from subversive to humorous absurdity to solemn and poetic artistic expressions. His work often relates to the physical body as it investigates issues of history, colonization, Indigenous identity and representation in popular culture, as well as conceptual ideas based on memory, home, and reserve communities.

He co-directed a short animation, with his daughter which has toured to film festivals in Vancouver, Toronto, Los Angeles, New York, Oxford, and New Zealand. The film won the prestigious Golden Sheaf Indigenous Award at the Yorkton Film Festival. His daughter was only 17 years old at the time of the award.

== Early life and education ==
Houle was born in 1975 in Calgary, Alberta, Canada. From 1971 to 1996, his father was an army sergeant in the Canadian Armed Forces, and the family moved often. This constant relocation reinforced the importance of his Indigenous identity and background, which formed the basis of his art practice. Houle earned a BFA degree in fibre & textiles from the Alberta College of Art and Design in 2003.

== Personal life ==
Growing up, Houle and his family traveled across North America attending ceremonies and dancing in powwows. He has a daughter, who is a registered member of the Kainai Nation and is of Saulteaux, Chinese, and Romanian descent.

== GHOST DAYS ==
Since 2014, Houle has been working on an ongoing collaborative project titled GHOST DAYS. The project evokes colonial and non-colonial histories that exist in the light of night, as in the darkness of the day, and awakens a collaboration with artists, audience, and spirit. GHOST DAYS has been realized through performances, a blog, music tracks on SoundCloud and Bandcamp, and a feature-length film hosted by Vimeo and represented by Vtape. The film was shot at IXL Brick Factory Medalta Clay Historical, Medicine Hat, Alberta.

== Art collections ==
His artwork Your Dreams Are Killing My Culture (2009) was acquired for the permanent collection of the National Gallery of Canada in 2011. Houle's work is also included in the permanent collections of the Glenbow Museum, the Art Gallery of Greater Victoria, The Art Gallery of Alberta and the Alberta Foundation for the Arts.

== Awards ==
Houle and his daughter won the prestigious Golden Shear Indigenous Award in 2021 from the Yorkton Film Festival for their short animation. In 2004, he received the Enbridge Emerging Artist Award presented at the Mayors Luncheon for the Arts, City of Calgary, Alberta. He was awarded Best Experimental Film at the 2004 imagineNATIVE Film and Media Festival in Toronto, Ontario. In 2003, he was an invited participant in the Banff Centre for the Arts program, Communion and Other Conversations Artist in Residency Program, in Banff, Alberta.

== Solo exhibitions ==
- 2010 Friend or Foe, Or Gallery, Vancouver, BC
- 2009–2010 Givn'r - York University, Toronto, ON; Plug-in Gallery, Winnipeg, MB; Thunder Bay Art Gallery, Thunder Bay, ON. This touring exhibition was a survey of Houle's work from 2003 to 2009.
- 2009 Things May Appear Larger - Red Shift Gallery, Saskatoon, SK
- 2008 85.11.16 - Skew Gallery, Calgary, AB
- 2005 Remember In Grade…- The New Gallery +15 Window, Calgary, AB
- 2003 Kipi-Dapi-Pook-Aki, Taking Back Control – Glenbow Museum, Calgary, AB
- 2003 A Little Western - +15 Window Project, Truck Gallery, Calgary, AB

== Group exhibitions ==
- 2010 SKIN, National Museum of the American Indian, New York, NY
- 2009 Friend or Foe, SAW Gallery, Ottawa, and Or Gallery, Vancouver, BC
- 2009 REZIDENTS, Open Sky Gallery, Fort Simpson and Neutral Ground, Regina (2010) and Neutral Ground, Regina, SK
- 2009 The World Upside Down, Art Gallery of Victoria, BC
- 2009 Face the 2 Nation, Art Gallery of Alberta, Edmonton, AB
- 2009 Photo LA 2008, SKEW Gallery, Los Angeles, CA
- 2009 Photo Miami 2007, SKEW Gallery, Miami, FL
- 2007 Alberta Biennial of Contemporary Art: Living Utopia and Disaster, Art Gallery of Alberta, Edmonton, AB
- 2006 Wagon Burner This! Princess Moonrider That!, A Space Gallery, Toronto, ON
- 2006 The Bodies That Were Not Ours, Linden St. Kilda Centre for the Contemporary Arts, Melbourne, Australia
