= Burnaby Village Museum =

Burnaby Village Museum & Carousel

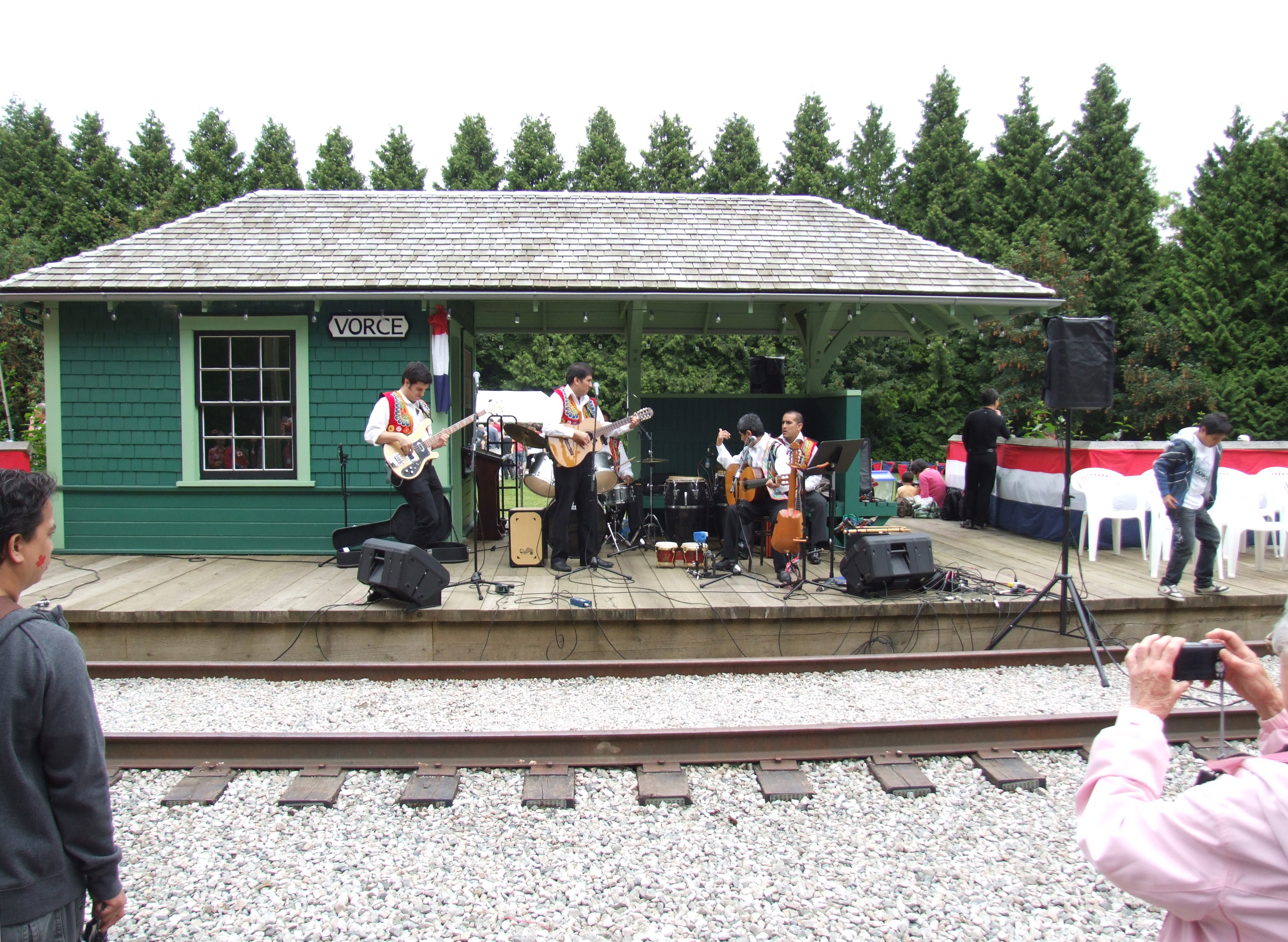
- Location: 6501 Deer Lake Avenue, Burnaby, British Columbia, Canada
- Coordinates: 49.2391°N 122.9661°W
- Type: open-air museum
- Website: www.burnabyvillagemuseum.ca

The Burnaby Village Museum, previously known as the Heritage Village, is an open-air museum in Burnaby, British Columbia, Canada, located at Deer Lake Park. It is open seasonally from May to September and opens for special events taking place September to March. The Burnaby Village Museum is a reconstructed 1920s village, containing 31 full scale buildings with staff interpreters and educators welcoming visitors and giving demonstrations in the homes, shops and businesses. The museum spans 10 acres (4 ha) of land. Some of the buildings are original heritage buildings, moved from other locations in the community and restored. Others are replica buildings, created to house specific displays and artifacts, including a 1912 B.C. Electric Railway interurban tram. The museum is also known for the 1912 C. W. Parker Carousel, available for visitors to ride.

== History ==
Burnaby Village Museum, opened as Heritage Village, was built in 1971 as a commemorative project of the 100th anniversary of the Province of British Columbia joining Confederation with Canada. The original layout of the Museum depicted a single street and manor house (Elworth) spread across 4.3 acres, which intended to illustrate how a small BC pioneer village may have looked around the turn of the 20th century.

On November 19, 1971, the official opening of the museum took place, officiated by Roland Michener, then governor general of Canada. Over 15,000 visitors attended the museum during its special three-day opening. It opened for its first season in 1972, and included several shops located in replica buildings on the main street, and the "manor house" (the 1922 home of the Bateman family, today known as Elworth). Livestock was part of the display, including horses who were shod in the blacksmith shop. An early promotional brochure promised visitors they would be able to "smell the burning hoof."

After the initial construction and fabrication of the Museum, the Museum continued to grow, adding new exhibits and buildings every year. Throughout the 1980s, the Municipality of Burnaby and Century Park Museum Association worked together on plans to acquire more land to expand administration and exhibit spaces. By the end of the decade the museum’s size had doubled, and a bridge was being built across Deer Lake Brook to accommodate a new entrance and development of a rural zone. After the Municipality of Burnaby took over the administration of the Museum in 1990, staff and volunteers created exhibits and programs representing Burnaby, with emphasis on the 1920s. It has since grown to a 10-acre (4 ha) heritage site and major attraction in the Metro Vancouver.

On July 5, 1975, the B.C. Society of Model Engineers opened the Burnaby Central Railway, a 7 1/2 in (190.5 mm) gauge ridable miniature railway located in the present-day Meadow area, next to the Interurban Tram Barn. The same year, a Chinese Herbalist display was opened, and a 1911 bachelor's house built by Burnaby resident Tom Irvine was moved to the site.

In 1976, the Royal Bank building from Britannia Beach was moved to the Village, as well as a 1927 Burnaby heritage building set up as a real estate and surveyor's office. In partnership with the Japanese-Canadian Citizens Association, an ofuro (Japanese bathhouse) display was opened at the Village in 1977. The replica ofuro was built to commemorate the arrival in B.C. of the first Japanese immigrant in 1877. The Vorce B.C. Electric railway station was also acquired in 1977.

In 1979, the Heritage Village became the set for the Canadian/German co-production of the 26-part TV series Huckleberry Finn and His Friends.

In 1984, the museum's name was changed from "Heritage Village" to "Burnaby Village Museum" to reflect its role as Burnaby's community museum. Iredale Partnership was hired in 1985 to create an expansion concept for Burnaby's Municipal Council to consider. The plan was completed in 1986, and accepted by Council in 1987. At that time, the site was expanded to approximately 9 acres, with new lands across Deer Lake Brook made available to the museum to expand, and to create a new entrance facility and administration building.

In 1987 the Seaforth School display was opened at the Village, with the restored 1922 school open to the public. By 1989, the popular "3R's" school program was being offered on a regular basis at the schoolhouse. In 1988, the 1893 Jesse and Martha Love farmhouse was acquired and moved to the museum, to be part of the "rural zone" display established in the newly acquired museum space across Deer Lake Brook.

That same year, the PNE's historic carousel was decommissioned. The Friends of the Carousel were formed to raise the money to purchase and restore the 1912 carousel. Burnaby promised to provide a building for the carousel at the Burnaby Village Museum.

In 1990, the Municipality of Burnaby took over operation of Burnaby Village Museum from the Century Park Museum Association. The following year, the Burnaby Central Railway closed, relocating to Confederation Park in North Burnaby.

In 1993, the C.W. Parker Carousel was officially opened, housed in the newly constructed Don Wrigley Pavilion. The museum's popular "Business as Usual" school program was launched in 1999, with "Home Sweet Home" following soon behind in 2000. In 2000, the museum opened its "Stride Studios" temporary exhibit gallery, allowing for temporary exhibits that explored topics beyond Burnaby in the 1920s to be featured as part of the visitor experience.

In 2001, the museum's 1912 British Columbia Electric Railway interurban tram was moved to a warehouse for a 5-year restoration project by the Friends of Interurban 1223. Prior to this, the car was on display at the Edmonds Bus Loop and was heavily vandalized, thus necessitating restoration. In 2007, the restored Interurban 1223 was returned to the museum, and installed in the newly constructed tram barn. Vorce station was constructed adjacent to the tram barn, and was restored to its original appearance in 2008.

The Burnaby Village Museum was an official stop for the Olympic Torch Relay in 2010. In celebration of the 40th anniversary of the museum, Burnaby City Council agreed to offer free admission to museum visitors for the 2011 summer and Christmas seasons.

== Permanent exhibits ==
The following is from the Burnaby Village Museum Visitors Map.

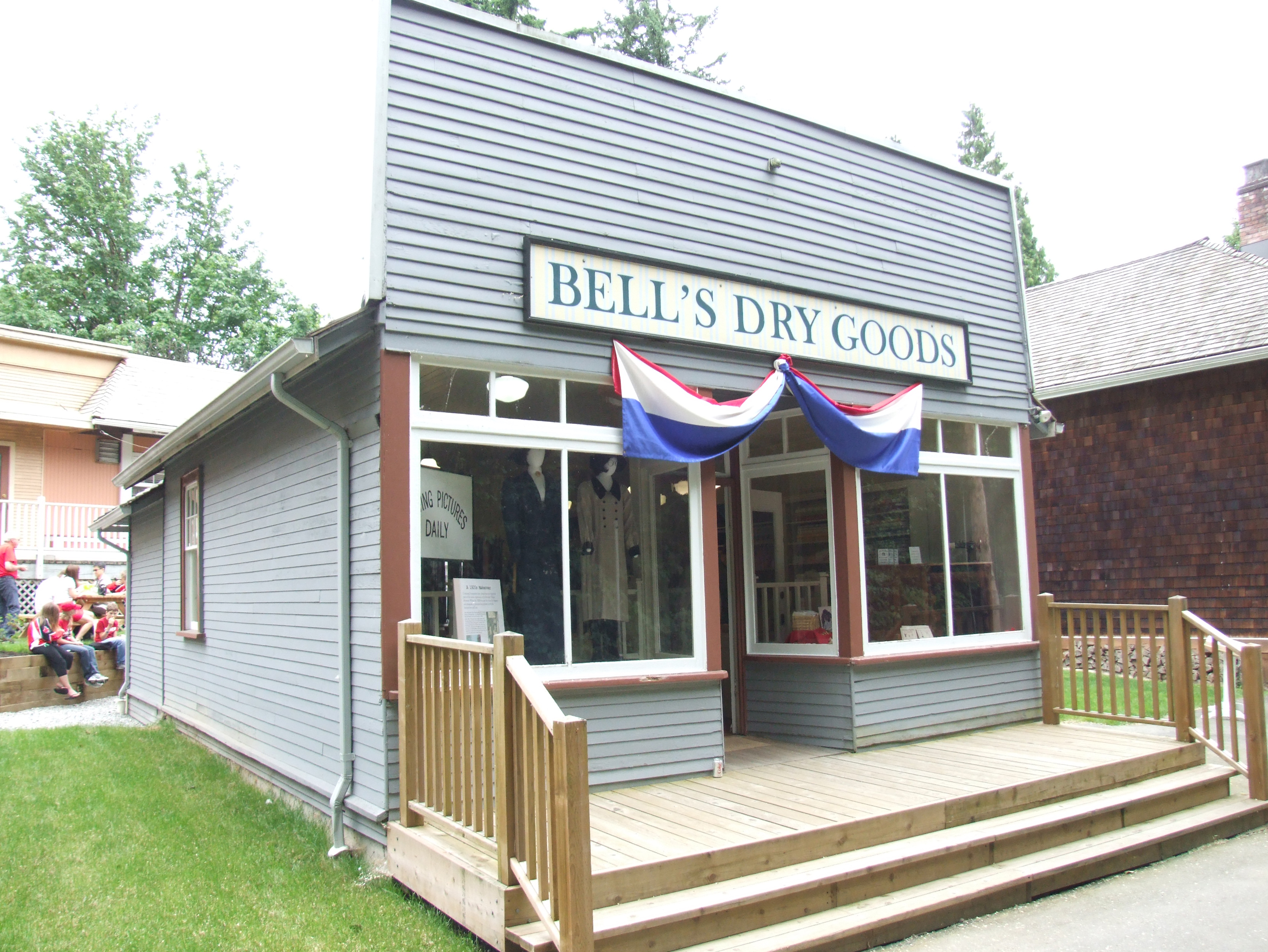
Bells Dry Goods operated between 1922 and 1937.

- Tom Irvine's House – 1911 Bachelor's house.
- Church – replica 1920s church, often used today for weddings.
- War Memorial Fountain – 1923 fountain erected by the Burnaby Civic Employees Union in front of Burnaby's Municipal Hall.
- Vorce Tram Station – This original 1911 station from the Burnaby Lake interurban line was restored to its original appearance in 2008.
- Interurban 1223 Tram Barn – A restored 1912 B.C. Electric Railway interurban tram, complete with information about the history of the BCER and its role in the development of Burnaby.
- C.W. Parker Carousel – A restored 1912 vintage carousel. Each horse is a work-of-art that was hand-carved and painted. Visitors can ride on the carousel for a small fee.
- Elworth – The 1922 home of Burnaby's Bateman family. It was once part of the exclusive Deer Lake neighbourhood.
- Elworth Garage – The original garage of the Elworth home.
- Drugstore – An example of a typical 1920s drugstore in Burnaby.
- McKay Barbership – A 1920s barbershop, modelled after Burnaby's McKay barbershop that operated on Kingsway.
- The Stride Studios – A temporary exhibit gallery that features a different special exhibit each year. In 2011, the gallery hosts "Prints from CPR Magic Lantern Slides, 1885–1930," curated by Michael Lawlor and Bill Jeffries and circulated by the Simon Fraser University Gallery.
- Burnaby Lake General Store – A 1920s General Store, based on an actual store from Burnaby.
- Royal Oak Garage – Based on a 1925 garage on Kingsway in Burnaby.
- Optometrist
- Central Park Theatre – Silent movies from the 1920s are played in the theatre.
- Old Curly Locomotive – The oldest surviving steam locomotive in British Columbia, used in the 1880s to build part of the Canadian Pacific Railway.
- Wagner's Blacksmith Shop – A working blacksmith shop, based on a 1925 Burnaby business.
- Steam Equipment – Examples of how steam was once used to power sawmills and industrial equipment.
- Steam Donkey – Steam donkeys were used to move logs in the forest by winching steel ropes.
- Log Cabin – A reproduction log house. Burnaby's first settler, William Holmes, built a log cabin in 1860.
- Japanese Ofuro – A replica Ofuro (bathhouse), built in 1977 to commemorate the arrival in B.C. of the first Japanese immigrant in 1877.
- Dow, Fraser & Co. Real Estate Office – A 1927 building originally a grocery store annexe.
- Royal Bank – Constructed in Britannia Beach in 1950, this Royal Bank building is set up to look like Burnaby's Royal Bank, which opened in 1921.
- Treble Clef Phonographs – A 1920s music shop with an operating player piano.
- The Burnaby Post – The working print shop representing the offices of Burnaby's weekly paper, the Burnaby Post.
- Way Sang Yuen Wat Kee – The contents from this replica Chinese herbalist's shop came from a store which operated in Victoria from about 1900 to 1971.
- The Home Bakery – The original "Home Bakery" was located on Kingsway, just east of Boundary Road.
- Bandstand – The museum's bandstand is based on the Central Park bandstand, built in 1895 and used until the 1920s.
- Vancouver Heights Sheet Metal Works – This little building was once a shed used for horseshoeing on Burnaby's Lubbock Farm. Today, it houses tinsmithing tools used to make a variety of items out of sheet metal.
- Bell's Dry Goods – This original store building, built circa 1922, housed the dry-goods business of Flora and William Bell until 1937.
- Seaforth School – A school building opened in Burnaby in 1922 with 20 students. It was located on the north side of Burnaby Lake at Government Street and Piper Avenue.
- Jesse Love Farmhouse – The 1893 farmhouse of Jesse and Martha Love.

== Affiliations ==
The museum is affiliated with the BC Museums Association, Canadian Museums Association, and the Canadian Heritage Information Network

== See also ==
- Burnaby Art Gallery in the same park
