= AMS Art Collection =

The AMS Art Collection, or AMS Permanent Collection, is a Canadian art collection owned by the Alma Mater Society, a student organization of the University of British Columbia. The collection is one of only two university student-owned permanent art collections in Canada. It includes paintings by major Canadian artists, including E.J. Hughes, Lawren Harris, Iain Baxter&, Roy Arden, Takao Tanabe, Ann Kipling, Roy Kiyooka, Jack Shadbolt, Toni Onley, Elizabeth Wyn Wood, Lawrence Paul Yuxweluptun, Tom Burrows, and so forth. The collection was valued at around $4 million CAD in 2017.

== History ==
The collection's history begins in 1940, when a UBC professor in English Department, Hunter Lewis approached the AMS with an idea of creating student governed art collection. The collection was primarily meant to decorate the walls of the newly opened Brock Hall on campus. In 1948, E.J. Hughes' painting, Abandoned Village, Rivers Inlet, BC (1947) was purchased by the AMS as a first piece of Brock Art Collection, a predecessor of the AMS Art Collection.

Under B.C. Binning’s management since 1958, the collection has acquired 23 artworks by important Canadian artists, in order to establish the Brock Hall Art Collection as a Canadian landmark. After Binning's departure from the Brock Hall Art Committee in 1969 due to his retirement, however, the collection has stared to receive less care than it used to be under the quick change in leadership and slow selection process of the new committee. Despite the highly attempted acquisitions in post-Binning's era, exemplified by Alvin Balkind's suggestion to purchase a controversial piece, Bagged Landscape (1965–69) by Iain Baxter&, the overall collection was still dominated by the conservative ideology that the landscape and abstracted figurative paintings hallmark the history of Canadian Fine Art.

Especially since 1960, the collection has been under the constant risk of vandalization and theft. The collection was moved to the then-new Student Union Building [SUB] in 1970 to be only shown in the art gallery there. Despite this effort, in 1974, there was a supposed heist. The Ubyssey reported 8 to 18 missing or stolen works. Because of poor record-keeping, the Brock Hall Art committee was unable to identify which artworks had actually been stolen.

In 1982, this gallery space was turned into a lounge by following the suggestion made by the Student Administrative Committee. According to the gallery president in 1988, Sara Mair, the collection was deteriorating due to lack of interest. She reports six artworks newly missing possibly before new humidity controlled vault was built in the SUB to store this collection. At this point, there were 56 paintings in this collection. While the security and storage condition have eventually improved, the observed lack of interest prevailed for following decades. According to Vancouver Courier's report in 2007, the art gallery commissioner for the student society said that there was no permanent places to display this 67-piece collection. The society therefore was displaying several pieces from the collection whenever possible.

== Hatch Art Gallery ==
In 2015, construction of the new student building, the AMS Student Nest, was completed and collection was moved to the vault therein. The collection is occasionally on display at Hatch Art Gallery, a student organized gallery space inside the Nest. The collection is also primarily managed by the AMS Art Gallery Manager and student volunteers at the Hatch Art Gallery.

Alongside works from the AMS Art Collection, the Hatch's annually programmed exhibitions feature work submitted by UBC community members, and are presented in partnership with other clubs and organizations on and off campus, such as yearly exhibitions with the AMS Sexual Assault Support Center and the production of a zine in collaboration with Centre A and Yarrow Intergenerational Society for Justice.

== History of selected collection pieces ==
=== Abandoned Village, Rivers Inlet, B.C. (1947) by E.J. Hughes ===
This landscape painting joined the collection in 1948 as a first piece Brock Hall Art Collection. The AMS paid 150 dollars for this oil painting "with the aid of funds donated by Lawren S. Harris and the graduating class of that year." This particular piece was valued at 900,000 dollars in the 2017 report. Despite its important in the history of AMS Art Collection, the AMS Council's Ad-Hoc Committee for the Sale of Hatch Art Planning and Execution (SHAPE) planned on selling this piece as a part of 2017 referendum, which allowed AMS the sale of up to 4 pieces from the collection. After a series of delays, it was decommissioned in 2022 alongside South of the Coppermine by A.Y Jackson and Northern Image by Lawren Harris, and subsequently sold through the Heffel Gallery for $1,801,250.

=== Passiflora V (1963) by Roy Kiyooka ===
This piece by Roy Kiyooka, an oil painting with some collage element on masonite was first exhibited at the Fifteenth Annual Contemporary Exhibition and Sale organized by the Women's Auxiliary to the Vancouver Art Gallery in 1963. The Brock Hall Art Committee purchased this piece for five-hundred dollars from New Design Gallery, which was one of the first Canada's contemporary art galleries located at 1157 West Pender Street in Vancouver at the time. Passiflora V officially joined the collection in 1965, on the same year when Kiyooka became an associate member of the Royal Canadian Academy of Arts and represented Canada at the Eighth São Paulo Biennial in Brazil, where he won a silver medal.

== Selected exhibition loans ==
- 1965 at Vancouver Art Gallery
- 1974 at the SUB Art Gallery
- 1988 The Alma Mater Society Art Collection at AMS Gallery
- 2015-16 Yours, Mine, Ours: The AMS Permanent Collection at AHVA Gallery and Hatch Art Gallery
- 2019 Contesting Paradise: BC Landscapes in the Permanent Collection at Hatch Art Gallery
- 2020 "The Works of the AMS Art Collection (yes, all of them)" - cancelled due to COVID-19 pandemic
