= B. C. Binning =

Canadian painter (1909–1976)

- Born: Bertram Charles Binning; February 10, 1909; Medicine Hat, Alberta
- Died: March 16, 1976 (aged 67)
- Education: Vancouver School of Art with F. H. Varley and C. H. Scott; New York, Art Students League (1939) with Yasuo Kuniyoshi and others; London with Henry Moore; New York with Amédée Ozenfant
- Spouse: Jessie Wyllie (married 1936)
- Awards: Officer, Order of Canada (1971); elected member in 1966, Royal Canadian Academy of Arts

Bertram Charles Binning OC RCA (10 February 1909 in Medicine Hat, Alberta – 16 March 1976 in Vancouver, British Columbia), known as B. C. Binning, was best known for his drawings until 1946 when he first exhibited his semi-abstract paintings.

== Career ==
In 1949, when he was teaching at the Vancouver School of Art (today's Emily Carr University of Art and Design), he was invited by Fred Lasserre, the first director of the School of Architecture at The University of British Columbia (U.B.C.) to come and teach art to the architecture students. Binning, from a family of architects, believed that art, architecture and life were intimately connected.

Binning invited Richard Neutra, one of the leading architects in the Modernism movement in California, to lecture in Vancouver in 1949 and 1953. He and his culturally aware wife Jessie (Wyllie) Binning (1906–2007) provided many opportunities in their home for artists, writers and architects to socialize.

Bert and Jessie Binning fostered close ties with the most recognized figures in art in Vancouver. They were friends with Lawren S. Harris and his wife, artist Bess Harris. Those in his academic circle of intimates from art school were Gordon A. Smith and his wife Marion Smith, Orville Fisher, Fred Amess, John Koerner, Jack Shadbolt and his wife Doris Shadbolt, Lionel Thomas, and also Bruno Bobak and his wife Molly Lamb Bobak. Binning wanted to introduce modernist architecture and "futuristic" urban and regional design, which were taking hold of Europe and the United States, to British Columbia.

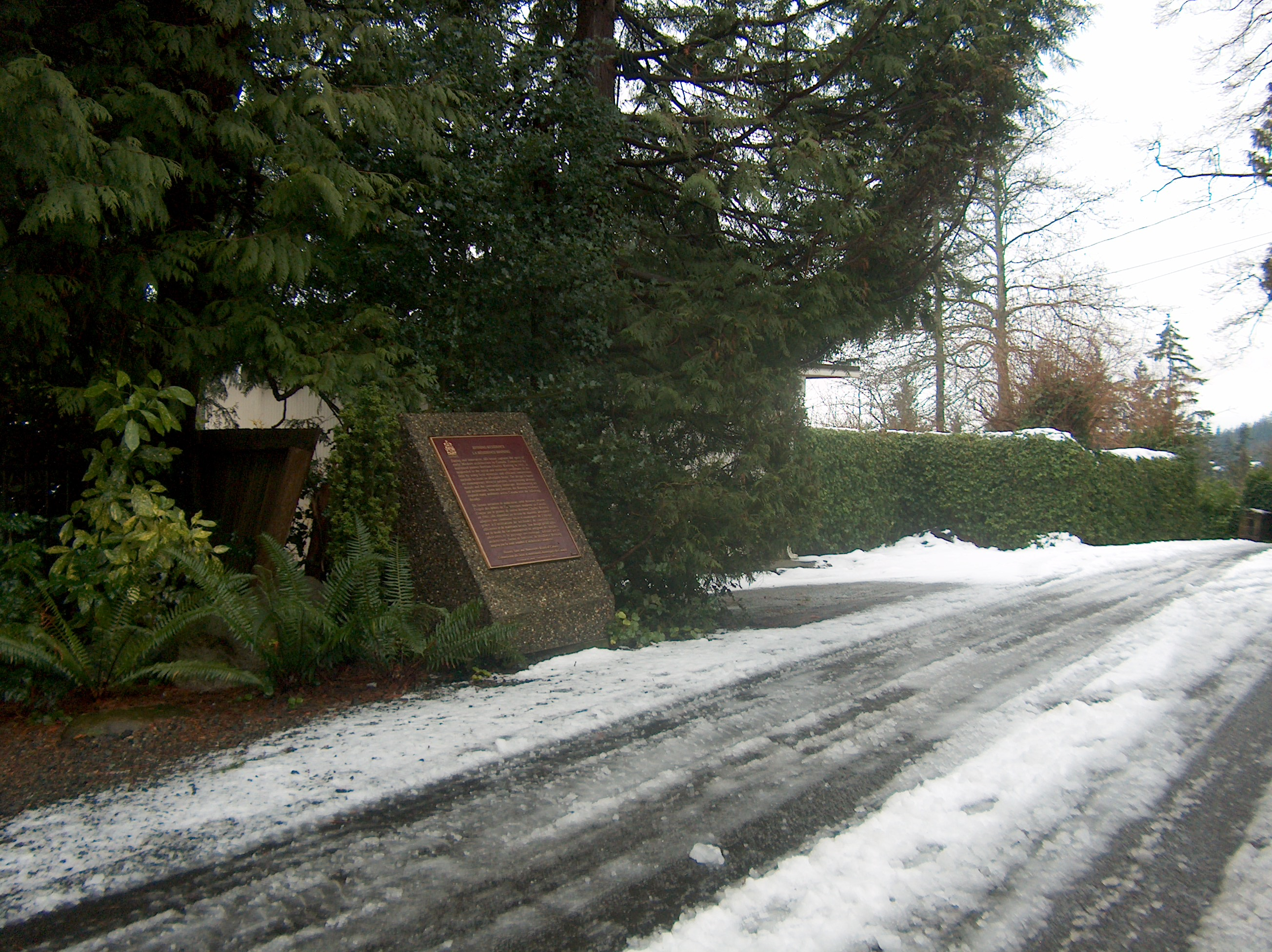
Plaque in front of the B.C. Binning house in West Vancouver

Binning revealed his lifestyle and experiences in drawings like a friend cutting a dog's hair or a picnic view from a high perch.

His paintings are internationally recognized and exhibited regularly. They are composed from his weekends sailing the British Columbia Coast with his wife. The celebratory touches are often primary colours. The expanses of painted shapes are purely those of the coast he knew.

In 1946, Binning helped to found the Art in Living Group, which in 1949 had a major show, Design for Living, at the Vancouver Art Gallery. In 1954, works by Binning, along with those of Paul-Émile Borduas, and Jean-Paul Riopelle represented Canada at the Venice Biennale.

His visits to Japan and personality made him a relevant figure in the negotiations for the Nitobe Garden at U.B.C. He founded and presided over the U.B.C. Festival of the Contemporary Arts, a mold-breaking yearly avant-garde celebration spanning the decade of the 1960s in Vancouver, at the peak of which Marshall McLuhan spoke in 1964.

Binning headed and founded the Department of Fine Arts at U.B.C. He presented many papers internationally; was on advisory boards; received innumerable grants, awards, fellowships, one-person shows and retrospective exhibitions. He became an Officer of the Order of Canada in 1971. Binning retired in 1974, and died in 1976.

In 1997, the Bauhaus-influenced Binning Residence Binning designed for himself in 1941 in West Vancouver was declared a National Historic Site of Canada. His widow, Jessie, surviving him by three decades, had lived and managed his legacy there until then. When Jessie died in 2007 at the age of 101, the ownership and management of the house transferred to The Land Conservancy of British Columbia (TLC). In 2013, TLC ran into financial difficulties and attempted to sell the house. After a protracted legal battle, TLC was ordered by the Supreme Court of British Columbia to return the house to the Estate of Jessie Binning. In 2015, the house was purchased by Jesse Saniuk, a local philanthropist and president of Four Sails Realty Inc. The house is currently being restored by its owner. Binning's work continues to be shown regularly in Metro Vancouver - lately at the Vancouver Art Gallery, Burnaby Art Gallery and West Vancouver Museum; and is part of The Artists4Kids Trust.

== Education ==
Binning started his studies in 1927 at the Vancouver School of Decorative and Applied Arts (shortly to become the Vancouver School of Art) under Frederick Varley and later taught at the school. In 1938–1939, he took a year's leave of his teaching duties to study in London, England under Mark Gertler, Bernard Meninsky and, most significantly, Henry Moore. Upon his return to North America, he spent a brief period studying in New York at the Art Students League.

== Selected commissions ==
- 1952: painted murals, O'Brien Advertising Centre, Vancouver
- 1952/53: interior architectural composition, B.C. Electric (Dal Grauer Substation, Vancouver)
- 1956: mosaic wall tile and facade colour scheme, B.C. Electric Building, Vancouver
- 1958: mosaic mural, Imperial Bank of Commerce, Vancouver
- 1963: colour design of Port Mann Bridge over Fraser River, B.C.

== Selected collections ==
- Art Gallery of Ontario, Toronto
- Dalhousie University Art Gallery, Halifax
- Morris and Helen Belkin Art Gallery, University of British Columbia
- National Gallery of Canada, Ottawa
- Musée national des beaux-arts du Québec, Québec
- Robert McLaughlin Gallery, Oshawa
- University of Lethbridge Art Gallery
- Vancouver Art Gallery
- West Vancouver Museum

== Bibliography ==
- Bradfield, Helen (1970). Art Gallery of Ontario: the Canadian Collection. Toronto: McGraw Hill. ISBN 0070925046. Archived from the original on June 7, 2020.
- Nasgaard, Roald (2008). Abstract Painting in Canada. Douglas & McIntyre. pp. 128–131. ISBN 9781553653943.
- Rogatnick, Abraham (2006). A Passion for the Contemporary. B. C. Binning. Vancouver: Douglas & McIntyre. ISBN 978-1-55365-171-0.
- Thom, Ian M. (2006). B.C. Binning. Vancouver: Douglas & McIntyre.
- Weder, Adele (2006). The House. B.C. Binning. Vancouver: Douglas & McIntyre.
