= Audain Prize for the Visual Arts =

Visual art award

- Description: Annual award for a distinguished Canadian artist
- Sponsored by: Audain Foundation
- Country: Canada
- Presented by: Audain Art Museum

The Audain Prize for the Visual Arts (Audain Prize) is an annual award that recognizes a distinguished Canadian artist. Worth $100,000, it is one of Canada's most significant honours for the arts. The prize is supported by the Audain Foundation and presented by the Audain Art Museum.

== History ==
The Audain Prize was established in 2004 by Michael Audain, Chair of the Audain Foundation. In 2019, the prize amount was increased to $100,000, bringing it in line with the Giller Prize and the Sobey Art Award, and renamed (previously the Audain Prize for Lifetime Achievement in the Visual Arts). From 2004 to 2018, the Audain Prize was funded by the Audain Foundation and administered by the Vancouver Art Gallery, in conjunction with the VIVA Awards. Since 2019, the Audain Prize continues to be supported by the Audain Foundation but is now administered by the Audain Art Museum.

== Selection ==
An independent jury, composed of volunteers of the visual arts community, brings forth nominations, discusses, and then selects a recipient. Typically included are Directors or Chief Curators, and one past prize recipient.

One recipient is selected annually, although in 2013, the jury made an exception and selected two recipients - Gathie Falk and Takao Tanabe. In 2020, as a result of the negative impact of the COVID-19 pandemic on the arts community, it was decided to allocate the prize monies to artist-run centres in British Columbia.

== Recipients ==
- Ann Kipling (2004)
- Edward J. Hughes (2005)
- Eric Metcalfe (2006)
- Gordon Smith (2007)
- Jeff Wall (2008)
- Liz Magor (2009)
- Robert Davidson (2010)
- Rodney Graham (2011)
- Marian Penner Bancroft (2012)
- Takao Tanabe and Gathie Falk (2013)
- Fred Herzog (2014)
- Michael Morris (2015)
- Paul Wong (2016)
- Carole Itter (2017)
- Susan Point (2018)
- Stan Douglas (2019)
- 12 Artist Run Centres (2020)
- James Hart (2021)
- Ian Wallace (2022)
- Dana Claxton (2023)
- Rebecca Belmore (2024)
- Brian Jungen (2025)
- Steven Shearer (2026)
