= Michael Audain =

Canadian home builder (born 1937)

Michael James Audain
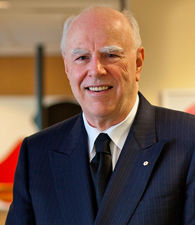
- Born: July 31, 1937 (age 89); Bournemouth, Dorset, England
- Education: University of British Columbia
- Occupation: Home builder
- Known for: Chairman of Polygon Homes Ltd. and Arts Philanthropy
- Spouse: Yoshiko Karasawa
- Children: 2

Michael James Audain, OC OBC (born July 31, 1937) is a Canadian home builder, philanthropist and art collector. He is the Chairman and major shareholder of the privately held Polygon Homes Ltd., one of the largest multi-family builders in British Columbia.

== Early life and education ==
Audain was born in Bournemouth, England. His father was a retired British Army officer, while his mother had a career as a London dress model.

Audain attended numerous schools in the United Kingdom due to frequent moves by his split-up family during World War II. His first nursery school was named St. Georges, located on Castle Street in Farnham, Surrey, while his first boarding school was called Melbreck Preparatory School situated in the countryside outside Farnham. Later, he attended Eagle House near Sandhurst in Berkshire.

In Canada, Audain attended Glenlyon School (now Glenlyon Norfolk School) and University School (now St. Michael's University School). Both are situated in Victoria, British Columbia. Later, he was sent to Trinity College School in Port Hope, Ontario.

In terms of higher education, Audain attended the University of Lyon in France, where he acquired a Diploma in French Civilization in 1959. At the University of British Columbia he earned a Bachelor of Arts in 1962, a Bachelor of Social Work in 1963, and a Masters in Social Work in 1965. He later attended the London School of Economics and Political Science as a Ph.D. student but did not submit a thesis. In 1977, Audain obtained a Certificate in Farm Management and Rural Appraisal from the University of California, Davis.

== Career ==
In the early 1970s, Audain established a reputation for himself as one of Canada's leading housing policy experts. After moving from the position of Director of Community Relations at the Ontario Housing Corporation in Toronto (now Ontario Mortgage and Housing Corporation) in 1969, he was appointed Housing Program Director at the Canadian Council on Social Development in Ottawa where he conducted a number of research studies on housing issues, most notably a national study on housing for the elderly, which was published as a book called Beyond Shelter. In Ottawa he also started and became editor of a quarterly publication called Housing and People.

In late 1973, Audain was called to the British Columbia government in Victoria by Premier David Barrett and appointed Special Advisor to the Minister of Housing, with the task of setting up a housing ministry. During this period he initiated policies that resulted in a significant increase in social and cooperative housing throughout British Columbia. To aid the process, he negotiated the purchase of Dunhill Development Ltd. which became the Housing Corporation of British Columbia and today is known as BC Housing.

After a term as chairman of the Provincial Commission on Mobile Homes, which published a well-received report, in 1976 Audain established a company called Audain Planning Ltd. to undertake research and provide advice on housing policy across Canada. Later in 1994 he was appointed by Premier Michael Harcourt as co-chairman of the Commission of Affordable Housing Options, which held public hearings and whose report ultimately played a significant role in revising municipal government's attitudes to so-called "illegal suites" and a host of other housing related matters.

From 1977 to 1979, Audain taught as a sessional lecturer at the University of British Columbia's School of Urban and Regional Planning (now the School of Community and Regional Planning).

In September 1980 Audain was appointed Executive Vice President of Polygon Properties Limited, becoming a partner in the firm. Then in 1988 he was appointed President, and in 1992 Chairman of Polygon Homes Ltd. He has continued to serve as Chair of the Board since Neil Chrystal's appointment as President in 2003.

=== Polygon Homes Ltd. ===
The history of Polygon Homes Ltd. started in 1980 when Audain was invited by W.K. Paulus to become the Executive Vice President and a partner in a company that owned an interest in three rental apartment properties. Initially, Audain built residential communities for housing cooperatives and non-profit organizations, but in 1983 he started building townhomes and apartments for the market. The company expanded in 1988 when Paulus sold his interest to Laing Property Corporation.

After Laing Property Corporation was taken over by P&O Limited, a British conglomerate, Audain and his partner Rick Genest negotiated the acquisition of all the shares in the company in 1992, with Polygon becoming 100 percent British Columbia owned and managed. After Genest's death as a result of a highway accident in 2002, Neil Chrystal became a major shareholder in the company and assumed the title of President and CEO. Since 1980, Polygon Homes Ltd. and its affiliated single-family builder Morningstar Homes Ltd. have completed the construction of over 34,000 homes in Metro Vancouver.

== Visual Arts ==
Audain has been a supporter of the visual arts in British Columbia and beyond. In 1992 he joined the board of trustees of the Vancouver Art Gallery and with a brief interregnum has been involved in the affairs of the Gallery until finishing his term as Chair of the Vancouver Art Gallery Foundation in 2014. He served as the Association's President/Chair from 1996 to 1998.

In 2005, Audain was appointed to the board of trustees of the National Gallery of Canada, and then as chair from 2009 to 2012. Reappointed as a Director of the National Gallery of Canada Foundation from 2019 to 2022, and now as Director Emeritus.

=== Audain Collection ===
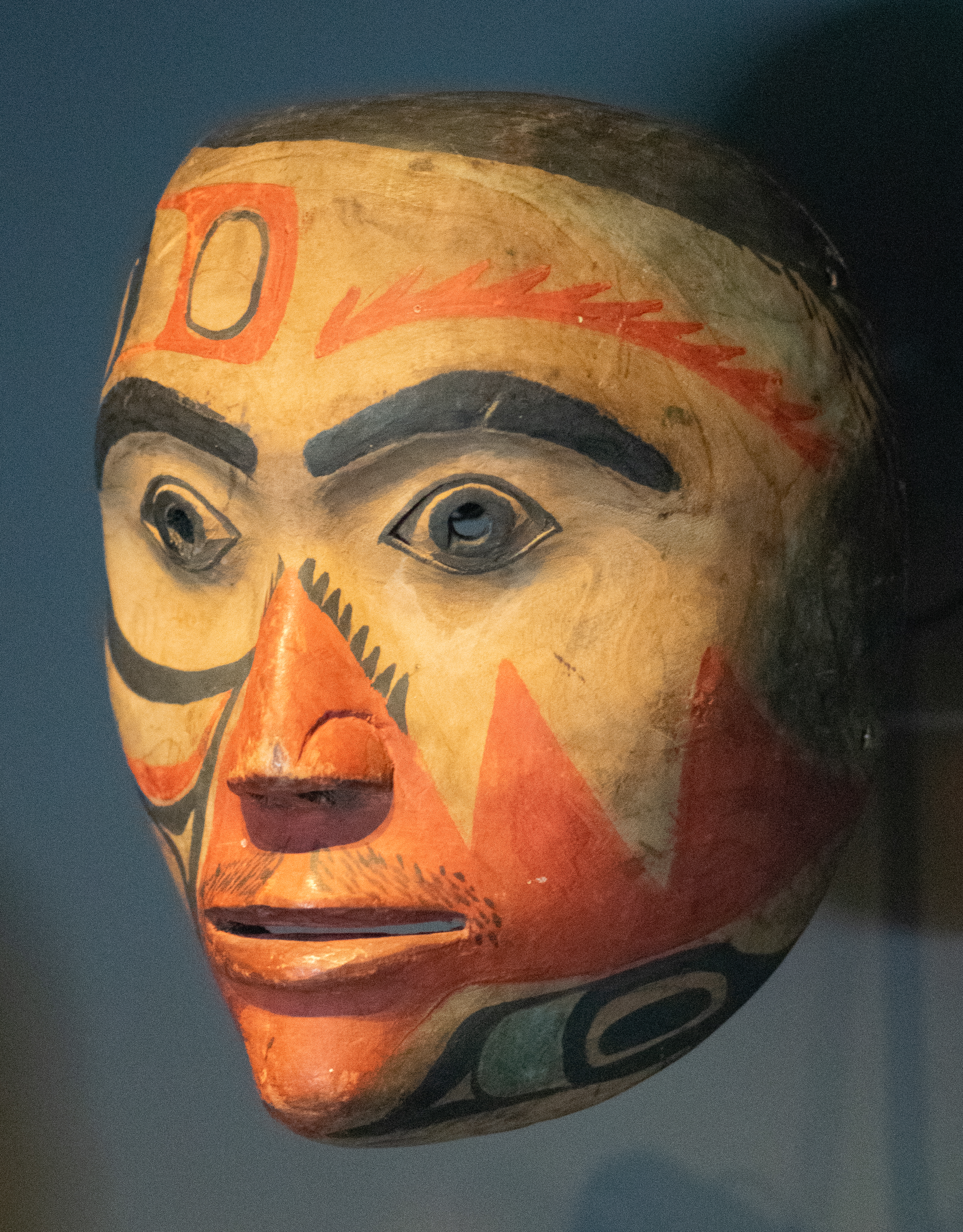
1860 Tsimshian portrait mask at Audain Art Museum

Audain and his wife Yoshiko Karasawa amassed a significant art collection which is considered among Canada's most outstanding. Particularly strong was a large group of Northwest Coast Indigenous Peoples masks which had been brought back to British Columbia from the United States and Europe, the acquisition and subsequent donation of a Potlach Figure to the U'Mista Cultural Centre in 2008; a major collection of Emily Carr's works, Canada's most important collection of Mexican modernist works, and one of the leading collections of Quebec artist Jean Paul Riopelle. The collection was in part exhibited at the Vancouver Art Gallery in late 2012 and early 2013. Nearly 140 works from this collection were installed at the Audain Art Museum in preparation for its opening in March 2016, and were subsequently donated to form the basis of the Museum’s permanent collection.

In early 2022, Audain and Karasawa donated eight works by another Québec artist, Paul-Émile Borduas to the Musée national des beaux-arts du Québec.

Audain has also commissioned works from a number of British Columbia artists (personally or through Polygon) to allow them to develop their talents, including: James Hart, Robert Davidson, Xwalacktun, Susan Point, Paul Wong, Marianne Nicolson, and Jay Simeon to name a few.

=== Audain Art Museum ===
In September 2012, Audain was invited to Whistler, British Columbia to discuss establishing a museum for his family collection. Less than a year after his visit, the 56,000 square foot Audain Art Museum building designed by Patkau Architects commenced construction on land donated by the Resort Municipality of Whistler for a 199-year lease. Adjacent to Whistler Village, the Audain Art Museum officially opened to the public on March 12, 2016 and houses a portion of the Audain Collection, a gallery dedicated to 15 works by E. J. Hughes, as well as offers spaces for special exhibitions. It is the only museum in Canada with a permanent collection that exclusively represents the artists of its home province. The Museum published a book by Ian M. Thom titled Masterworks from the Audain Art Museum, Whistler.

The Audain Art Museum Foundation was subsequently created to raise an endowment fund of $25 million (now increased to $50 million) to support the operations of the Audain Art Museum. This registered not-for-profit charitable corporation is governed by a Board of Directors chaired by Audain. By mid-2024, the endowment fund goal of just under $50 million has been realized through donations by persons and companies called the Museum’s “Founders”.

=== Jean Paul Riopelle Foundation ===
Passionate about the legacy of Quebec artist Jean Paul Riopelle (1923-2002), Audain announced on October 3, 2019 the creation of the Jean Paul Riopelle Foundation. Serving as Chairman, Audain is joined on the board by Riopelle’s eldest daughter, business executives, art historians, and collectors dedicated to celebrating the contribution of the artist to international art history. The Foundation will also serve as a centre of scholarship in the documentation, publication and discourse on the oeuvre of Jean Paul Riopelle.

October 7, 2023 marked the centenary of Riopelle’s birth and the Foundation has collaborated for over an entire year with cultural and government partners to provide a multitude of opportunities to acknowledge his contribution to the visual arts.

On May 4, 2024 the groundbreaking for the Espace Riopelle pavilion at the Musée national des beaux-arts du Québec confirmed the collaboration between the MNBAQ, provicial and federal levels of government, and several Foundation members to create and build a new pavilion that will house a permanent collection of the artist’s work. The new pavilion was inaugurated on October 21, 2026.

== Philanthropy ==
=== Audain Foundation ===
Audain chairs the Board of the Audain Foundation, which was established in 1997 to support the visual arts in British Columbia with grants and endowments for capital projects and exhibitions at major public art galleries and educational institutions. More recently, the Foundation has expanded its scope to include wildlife interests, including start-up funding for the new Grizzly Bear Foundation.

The Audain Foundation has supported many initiatives, among them: the Audain Endowment for Contemporary Canadian Art and the Audain Curator of Indigenous Art at the National Gallery of Canada (in recognition of this support, together with donations for special projects, collections and operations, the contemporary exhibition space is named La Salle Audain); the Audain Curator of British Columbia Art, the Audain Emerging Artists Acquisition Fund, and the Post-Secondary Student Engagement in BC Program and the capital campaign for the new gallery building project at the Vancouver Art Gallery; the Audain Curator of First Nations Art Endowment Fund for the Art Gallery of Greater Victoria; the Audain Professorship in Contemporary Art Practice of the Pacific Northwest and the Audain Gallery and Atrium at the University of Victoria; the Audain Endowment for Curatorial Studies, the Audain Art Centre, the commissioning of the Reconciliation Pole by James Hart, and the Audain Chair in Historical Indigenous Art at the University of British Columbia; the donation of a Nuu-chah-nulth ceremonial club from Captain James Cook's collection, and the Audain Gallery at the Museum of Anthropology; a gift to support Northwest Coast art studies and the Audain Visual Artists-in-Residence Program/School for the Contemporary Arts at Simon Fraser University (recognized with naming the main exhibition space the Audain Gallery); the acquisition of a Bill Reid masterpiece for the Royal British Columbia Museum; the annual Emerging Artist Scholarship at YVR Art Foundation; the Audain Art Studio at Brentwood College; the Audain Great Hall at the Bill Reid Gallery of Northwest Coast Art; the Gordon Smith Gallery of Canadian Art; the Audain Distinguished Artist-in-Residence Program and the Audain Faculty of Visual Arts at Emily Carr University of Art and Design; the Audain Chief Curator Endowment Fund and the new building for The Polygon Gallery (previously Presentation House Gallery) in North Vancouver; the Arts Umbrella capital campaign for a new building; and an endowment to build children’s and youths’ arts programs in underserved communities [commitment acknowledged through the naming of the “Audain School of Art & Design”]; the Audain Art Museum building and art acquisitions; and the public art program at the new St. Paul's Hospital, and the building of Espace Riopelle pavilion at the Musée national des beaux-art du Québec (MNBAQ).

In 2004, the annual Audain Prize for the Visual Arts was established to recognize the outstanding achievements of British Columbia's senior artists. The $100,000 award is now administered by the Audain Art Museum. In conjunction with the Audain Prize, the Foundation provides five $7,500 Audain Travel Awards to young artists enrolled in a full-time arts program at the undergraduate or graduate level.

=== Grizzly Bear Foundation ===
A close encounter with a grizzly bear (Ursus arctos) and her three cubs inspired Audain to establish and fund a registered charitable organization in 2016, dedicated to the welfare of grizzly bears. The Grizzly Bear Foundation supports the conservation and preservation of grizzly bears through research and public education. It commissioned a Board of Enquiry to travel the province of British Columbia in the fall of 2016 to seek information from individuals and organizations that have an interest in the grizzly bear. The report summarizing the findings of this Enquiry was submitted to the Provincial Government in March 2017 led to the termination of the infamous Grizzly Bear Trophy Hunt.

== Personal life ==
During the 1960s, Audain led a colourful life as a social activist. At the University of British Columbia he founded and was President of the Nuclear Disarmament Club, which among other initiatives, organized peace marches. In 1962, Audain organized the largest peace march in Vancouver since the 1930s. Also at the University of British Columbia, together with a group of faculty members, Audain founded The Penthouse Radical Society, which met monthly on the top floor of the Faculty of Arts Buchanan Building to discuss social and economic issues.

Audain also served as an editor of the international magazine, Our Generation Against Nuclear War.

Audain was a delegate to the 1961 founding convention of Canada’s New Democratic Party.

In the summer of 1961, he was a Freedom Rider in the United States south, and was sentenced in Jackson, Mississippi to a jail term and a $250 fine. He served part of his sentence in the city jail in Jackson, as well as the Mississippi State Penitentiary at Parchman.

Together with a group of University of British Columbia faculty, Audain was instrumental in founding the BC Civil Liberties Association in 1962.

Audain authored and published his second book in 2021, a memoir entitled One Man in His Time, and a third book in 2023 featuring images and background stories regarding his art collection over many years, entitled Pictures on the Wall.

== Awards and honours ==
1. Queen's Golden Jubilee Medal (2002)
2. Order of BC (2007)
3. Order of Canada (2009)
4. Queen's Diamond Jubilee Medal (2012)
5. Ordre des mécènes a Québec – see Michael Audain and Yoshiko Karasawa
6. King Charles III Coronation Medal (2024)
7. National Battlefields Commission Medal (2024)
8. Freedom of City of Vancouver (2025)

=== Honorary degrees ===
1. Emily Carr University of Art and Design (2005)
2. Simon Fraser University (2005)
3. University of Victoria (2009)
4. University of British Columbia (2014)
5. Vancouver Island University (2017)
6. St. Mark’s College (2023)

=== Industry ===
Audain is a past Chairman of the Business Council of British Columbia, and a past President of the Urban Development Institute Pacific Region.

1. Builder of the Year Award – Urban Development Institute Pacific Region (1987)
2. Homebuilders Association Vancouver Hall of Fame (2005)
3. Business Laureate of the British Columbia Hall of Fame] (2009)
4. Member Urban Development Institute Hall of Fame (2012)
5. The Fraser Institute Founder's Award (2021)

=== Culture ===
1. Edmund C. Bovey Award – Business for the Arts (2004)
2. British Columbia Museums Association Award for Distinguished Service (2005)
3. Simon Fraser University President's Distinguished Community Leadership Award (2008)
4. Greater Vancouver Board of Trade Community Leadership Award (2008)
5. Vancouver Biennale Philanthropy in the Arts Award (2011)
6. Vancouver Mayor's Arts Award for Philanthropy (2012)
7. Royal Canadian Academy of Arts Medal (2013)
8. Greater Vancouver Board of Trade Rix Award for Engaged Community Citizenship (2017)
9. Canadian Museums Association President's Award (2017)
10. Royal Architectural Institute of Canada, Metro Vancouver Chapter, Architecture Advocacy Award (2017)
11. Alma Mater Society, University of British Columbia Great Trekker Award (2019)
12. Award of Distinction, alumni UBC Association (2025)
