= Ann Kipling =

Canadian artist (1934-2023)

- Born: Barbara Ann Kipling; 1934; Victoria, British Columbia
- Died: August 30, 2023 (aged 88–89); Vernon, British Columbia
- Spouse: Leonhard Epp

Ann Kipling L.L.D (1934 – August 30, 2023) was a Canadian artist who created impressionistic portraits and landscapes in drawings and prints on paper from direct observation.

Kipling's distinctive style of overlapping, temporally suggestive linework was formed through her working process, which involved drawing her subject over time, recording subtle shifts in movement in the sitter or landscape during that period. Her work is characterized by a flat sense of space, where lines are used to frame a vibrating and gestural idea of her subject, rather than a direct representation of form. While not directly connected to any art movement in particular, connections can be made to Chinese landscape painters and the watercolours of Paul Cézanne. Using colour minimally, her primary media was etching, drawing, watercolours, pen, pencil, pastels and pencil crayons. She lived and worked in Falkland, British Columbia, a location which serves as a focus for her landscapes.

== Early life and education ==
From 1955 to 1960, Kipling studied at the Vancouver School of Art (now Emily Carr University of Art and Design). She studied with Jan Zack, Herbert Siebner, and Rudy Kovak before gaining her footing as an artist in the 1960s–1970s, most notably with her first solo show at the Vancouver Art Gallery in 1971. In the 1960s, she moved to the Lynn Valley where she lived and worked for a number of years. During this period her interest in depictions of natural phenomenon grew, and she began developing her individual style which involved working in extended sessions for her plein air landscapes and sittings with models for portraiture.

== Later work ==
Kipling described her practice as follows, "When I am drawing from the figure or the landscape, I am fascinated by the change, movement, energy and transformation of form in a seemingly static situation" (Ann Kipling, 2003, For the Record, Drawing Contemporary Life). She showed regularly in group and solo shows in Canada from the 1970s to the present day. In 2009 she made 141 drawings, mostly of the mountains around Falkland, British Columbia, which were the focus of her 2011 exhibition at the Burnaby Art Gallery (Burnaby, British Columbia), The Solitudes of Place: Recent Drawings by Ann Kipling. Her common tools of the trade are a drawing board, graphite, coloured pencils, pens and BFK Rives paper. Her works are commonly titled based on the day they are made, rather than the location, creating a sense of chronological unfolding or journaling in her oeuvre.

She has works in the permanent collection of the National Gallery of Canada, The Burnaby Art Gallery, the Audain Art Museum and in private and public collections across the nation. In 1995, she had a retrospective at the Vancouver Art Gallery. In 2004 she was the first recipient of the Audain Prize (named after Michael Audain). In 2017, her work was included in the exhibition, The Ornament of a House: Fifty Years of Collecting at the Burnaby Art Gallery.

== Personal life ==
In 1961, Kipling married German-Canadian sculptor Leonhard Epp (1932–2018). She has lived in Sunshine Falls, British Columbia, and Falkland, British Columbia. She was a dedicated Tai Chi and yoga practitioner.

== Selected solo exhibitions ==
- 1971 Drawings by Ann Kipling (travelling show), Vancouver Art Gallery, Vancouver
- 1976 Ann Kipling (travelling show), Vancouver Art Gallery, British Columbia
- 1980 Ann Kipling: Recent Landscapes (travelling show), Art Gallery of Greater Victoria, Victoria, British Columbia
- 1982 Ann Kipling: Prints (travelling show), Art Gallery of Greater Victoria, Victoria, British Columbia
- 1987 Ann Kipling (show of portraits), Art Gallery of Greater Victoria, Victoria, British Columbia, toured to Vancouver Art Gallery and the Kelowna Art Gallery
- 1991 Three Decades: Ann Kipling, Vernon Art Gallery, Vernon, British Columbia
- 1995 Ann Kipling (travelling show), Vancouver Art Gallery, Vancouver
- Ann Kipling: Prints, 1958–1967 (travelling show), Kamloops Art Gallery, Kamloops, British Columbia
- Ann Kipling: Prints & Drawings, Vernon Art Gallery, Vernon, British Columbia
- 2000 Ann Kipling: Prints (traveling show), Kamloops Art Gallery, Kamloops, British Columbia
- 2011 The Solitudes of Place: Recent Drawings by Ann Kipling, Burnaby Art Gallery, Burnaby, British Columbia
- 2014 Ann Kipling: The Falkland Drawings: a thirty-five-year survey, Kelowna Art Gallery (Kelowna, British Columbia)

== Awards ==
- 2008 Honorary Doctorate, Emily Carr University, Vancouver
- 2004 Audain Prize for Lifetime Achievement in the Visual Arts
- numerous Canada Council Grants, including the Victor Martyn Lynch-Staunton Award in 1987
- 1993 Project Assistance for Visual Arts, British Columbia Cultural Services grant
- 1960 and 1964 Koerner Foundation grant
- Emily Carr Scholarship
- Vancouver School of Art Travel Scholarship
