= Lionel Thomas =

Lionel Thomas may refer to:

- Lionel Thomas (cricketer)
- Lionel Thomas (artist)

== See also ==
- Lionel Beaumont-Thomas, Welsh businessman, British Army officer and politician
