= Alma Mater Society =

Alma Mater Society may refer to:

- Alma Mater Society of Queen's University
- Alma Mater Society of the University of British Columbia

== See also ==
- Alma mater
