= West Vancouver Art Museum =

Museum in Vancouver, British Columbia

Coordinates: 49.3304°N 123.1598°W

The West Vancouver Art Museum is dedicated to building awareness of diverse forms of contemporary and historical art, architecture and design. It is established in 1994 and housed in the historic Gertrude Lawson house in West Vancouver, British Columbia, Canada. Through its exhibitions, programs and community initiatives, the Museum engages audiences with ideas and visions that resonate both within the local community and the broader cultural conversations. Its permanent collection includes work by B.C. Binning, Gordon A. Smith, Jeff Wall, Takao Tanabe, Emily Carr, Selwyn Pullan and John Fulker. Recent exhibitions at the Museum include Patkau Architects: Matter Made Material and Continuing the Ceremony: Chief Dr. Janice George and Students.

West Coast Modern Week, from its early West Coast Modern Home Tours established in 2006 to the current expanded program, features an extensive lineup of events, including lectures, panels, exhibitions and tours. The Home Tour has featured more than 70 notable architectural projects across West Vancouver, engaging the community with design innovations ranging from mid-century modernism to contemporary architecture, including homes designed by prominent Canadian architects such as Arthur Erickson, Ron Thom, Paul Merrick, and others.

West Vancouver Art Museum is operated by the District of West Vancouver and is directed by curator, Pantea Haghighi. It was formerly directed by Darrin Morrison from 2005 to 2020 and by Hilary Letwin from 2021 to 2024.
