= Scorned as Timber, Beloved of the Sky =

Painting by Emily Carr

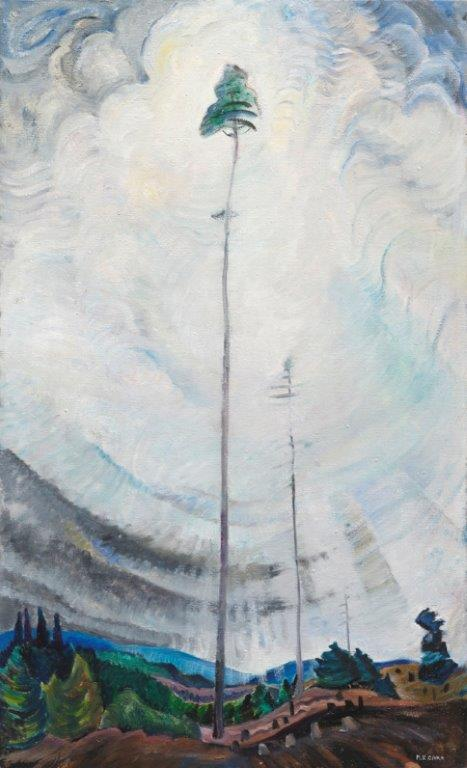
- Artist: Emily Carr
- Year: 1935
- Medium: Oil on canvas
- Dimensions: 112.0 cm × 68.9 cm (44.09 in × 27.13 in)
- Location: Vancouver Art Gallery, Vancouver

Scorned as Timber, Beloved of the Sky is a painting by Canadian painter Emily Carr. It is oil on canvas, and is part of the collections at the Vancouver Art Gallery. It was painted in 1935.

== Background ==
Carr had focused on dense compositions of forest scenes in the early 1930s, such as 1932's Forest, British Columbia. Art historian and Carr biographer Doris Shadbolt wrote that the painter was "clearing her thoughts for her emerging new phase of creation" in this period. The painting is one of a series of landscapes depicting human destruction of the land that Carr painted in the 1930s, including Stumps and Sky (1934), Logger's Culls (1935), Above the Gravel Pit (1937), and Odds and Ends (1939). It was likely inspired by logged areas in southern Vancouver Island, which Carr travelled extensively. Carr had purchased a caravan in 1934, which she used to relocate to areas around Victoria.

== Description ==
Scorned depicts a scene from forested land after a logging operation. Visible in the lower portion are bare ground and stumps from cut trees. The focus of the painting is an isolated coniferous tree, left behind by the logging crew. Two more similar trees are visible in the background. The tree is highlighted with heavy painterly and gestural brush stokes depicting clouds and atmosphere.

== History ==
The painting was first shown at the Vancouver Art Gallery as part of an exhibition of 28 pieces in October of 1938. For sale for $225, the painting failed to sell. As part of her will, Carr, who died in 1945, created the Emily Carr Trust. Scorned was included in the collection of the Trust, which allowed the sale and loan of Carr paintings, providing the profits went to art education in British Columbia. In 2014, the Vancouver Art Gallery placed the painting in an exhibition with the work of photographer Edward Burtynsky in the context of industrial landscapes and environmental degradation.

== Influence ==
Author and artist Douglas Coupland recreated Scorned in his series of digitally altered versions of Canadian nature paintings in 2011. Musician Neko Case used the painting's title for two tattoos; the work is one of her favourite paintings. Both artists are graduates of the Emily Carr University of Art and Design.
