= Paul Goranson =

Canadian artist (1911–2002)

- Born: Paul Alexander Goranson; April 27, 1911; Vancouver, British Columbia
- Died: August 3, 2002 (aged 91); Vancouver, British Columbia
- Education: Vancouver School of Art; British Columbia College of Art with F. H. Varley; Art Students League of New York with Robert Brackman and Will Barnett
- Known for: Painting; mural
- Title: Official war artist

Paul Goranson (April 27, 1911 – August 3, 2002) was an official Canadian war artist with the Royal Canadian Air Force and was noted for the exactness of his pictures and the fearless way he worked under fire during World War II. He painted both the men and their machines.

== Biography ==
Goranson was born in Vancouver, British Columbia, in 1911. After attending the Vancouver School of Art (today Emily Carr University of Art and Design) and the British Columbia School of Art (1931–1934) where he received full training in drawing the figure from F. H. Varley. Goranson then worked as a portrait artist and commercial artist.

With fellow Vancouver artists Orville Fisher and E. J. Hughes (the trio called themselves the Western or West Coast Brotherhood, echoing the Pre-Raphaelite Brotherhood), he painted several mural paintings. Drawing inspiration from the bold colours of the Mexican artist Diego Rivera and from the heroic style of the American Thomas Hart Benton, the trio executed a series of large panels for a cabaret restaurant in Vancouver's Chinatown and murals for a church. They then produced a series on the industries of British Columbia for a 12-part mural at the British Columbian pavilion at the 1939 San Francisco World's Fair, the Golden Gate International Exposition. Goranson also worked on murals at the Malaspina Hotel, Nanaimo, later covered over by renovation work.

As a graphic artist and printmaker of merit, Goranson joined the Canadian Society of Graphic Art. He also taught drawing at the Vancouver School of Art at nights (1936–1941) and taught print-making, during the summers from 1937 to 1940. In 1941, Goranson had a solo exhibition at the Vancouver Art Gallery.

Posted to Newfie (1942), watercolour. In the collection of the Canadian War Museum.

In 1941, he joined the Royal Canadian Air Force and two years later—after receiving his commission as an Official Second World War artist —became the first Air Force artist to be sent overseas. He was taught by looking at the work of Carl Schaefer and Charles Comfort.

On Goranson's trip to England in 1943, his ship, the 5,000-ton banana boat SS Tucurinca, was torpedoed south of Iceland. The torpedo struck in the evening while Goranson was sketching, but the passengers and crew were rescued and taken to Glasgow, Scotland. Goranson used this experience to sketch himself in an open boat.

While overseas he painted Bomber Command activities before going to Tunisia and Italy in August 1943. From July 1944 to spring of 1945, he painted scenes with the Tactical Air Force in Northwest Europe. He remained overseas until 1947 because he felt he had work to complete. Goranson said the war launched him as an artist.

The artist spent two years in Ottawa after the war, then, finding no work in Toronto, he went to New York where he ran a company which provided window displays for department stores such as Macy's and Gimbels. From 1966 until his retirement in 1986, he worked at the Metropolitan Opera as a scenic artist with artists and designers such as Marc Chagall. After he retired in 1986 at the age of 75, he returned to live in Vancouver. In 2000, his work was included in the Canadian War Museum's major exhibition Canvas of War: Masterpieces from the Canadian War Museum.

Goranson died in Vancouver in 2002, at the age of 91.

== Collections and archives ==
His work is in the National Gallery of Art, London, England; the Brooklyn Museum, New York; the National Gallery of Canada, Ottawa; and the Canadian War Museum (which holds 131 of his works on permanent display).

In the Vancouver Art Gallery library, there is a three page letter from Goranson to Gallery Director Jerrold A. Morris, dated February 19, 1950, in which he talked about his life and artwork.
