= Orville Fisher =

Canadian artist (1911-1999)

- Born: Orville Norman Fisher; November 24, 1911; Vancouver, B.C.
- Died: July 13, 1999 (aged 87); Langley, B.C.
- Education: Vancouver School of Art (graduated 1933) with F. H. Varley and Jock Macdonald; B.C. College of Arts
- Known for: Official Canadian War Artist, muralist, painter, graphic artist

Orville Fisher (November 24, 1911 – July 13, 1999) was an Official Canadian war artist, muralist, graphic artist and painter. He was the only Allied war artist to take part in the D-Day invasion of Normandy. He came ashore with the 3rd Infantry Division of the Canadian Army at Juno Beach, and depicted the turmoil of war in his drawings and art work.

== Career ==
Born in Vancouver, B.C., Fisher attended the Vancouver School of Art (today the Emily Carr University of Art and Design), graduating in 1933, studying with F. H. Varley from whom he received training in drawing the figure, and Jock Macdonald. Afterwards, he went to the British Columbia College of Arts (1931-1934).

With fellow Vancouver artists Paul Goranson and E. J. Hughes (the trio called themselves the Western or West Coast Brotherhood, echoing the Pre-Raphaelite Brotherhood), he painted several murals. Inspired by Diego Rivera and Thomas Hart Benton, the trio executed a series of large panels for a cabaret restaurant in Vancouver's Chinatown and murals for the First United Church, then murals at the Malaspina Hotel in Nanaimo. They then produced a series on the industries of British Columbia for a 12-part mural at the British Columbian pavilion at the 1939 San Francisco World's Fair, the Golden Gate International Exposition.

== War work ==
At the outbreak of the Second World War in 1939, Fisher joined the army in the Corps of Royal Canadian Engineers. He was employed as a sapper and service artist until he joined the infantry. In 1943, he was transferred to officer training and made an Official Second World War artist.

On June 6, 1944, Fisher came ashore with the 3rd Canadian Division at Mike Beach near Courseulles-sur-Mer (at the eastern part of Juno Beach). As he was landing, he realized that the art supplies he carried might drown him and threw them away. When he arrived on the beach, he had only tiny pads of "waterproof paper strapped to his wrist and a charcoal pencil". Fisher stayed with the 3rd Division until it reached Nijmegen in the Netherlands, then he returned to the front at Rotterdam, where he worked until the war ended.

He made 246 images of the battle and related subjects which are now part of the permanent collection of the Canadian War Museum in Ottawa. They have a sense of immediacy from being observed close to the time of painting.

== Later life ==
After the war, Fisher returned to Vancouver where he began a teaching career at the Vancouver School of Art which lasted 30 years; he taught painting and was head of the Graphics department as well as continuing to work as a muralist, graphic artist, and painter. Through his war work, he became friendly with Charles Comfort and later assisted him with a mural for the Toronto-Dominion Bank in Vancouver. He also painted five murals for the lobby of the B.C. Electric Building. Fisher died in July 1999 at 88 years old in Langley, B.C.
