= Gordon A. Smith =

English-born Canadian artist (1919–2020)

- Born: Gordon Appelbe Smith; June 18, 1919; East Brighton, England
- Died: January 18, 2020 (aged 100); West Vancouver, British Columbia, Canada
- Known for: Painter, printmaker, sculptor and teacher
- Spouse: Marion Fleming (m. 1941)
- Awards: Order of Canada, Governor General's Award in Visual and Media Arts, Audain Prize for Lifetime Achievement in the Visual Arts

Gordon Appelbe Smith CM RCA (June 18, 1919 – January 18, 2020) was an English-born Canadian artist, known for expanding the dialogue between abstraction and representation, working with mediums such as painting, printmaking, and sculpting. Smith taught with contemporaries Bruno Bobak, B.C. Binning and Jack Shadbolt at the Vancouver School of Art (now Emily Carr University of Art and Design) for 10 years, then for 26 years at the University of British Columbia before retiring in 1982 to paint full-time.

== Early life and education ==
He was born Gordon Appelbe Smith in East Brighton, England. His father, William George Smith, was an amateur watercolourist. He took Gordon and his brother Donald on frequent visits to the National Gallery, London and to the Tate. He attended the Harrow County School for Boys where Gordon received four years of formal art training and several prizes for his art. In 1933, Smith's parents separated. His mother Daisy Smith took the boys to live in Winnipeg, Manitoba, Canada.

In 1935, he studied at the Vancouver Normal School and Vancouver School of Art, then, from 1937 to 1940, he studied art at the Winnipeg School of Art. In 1939, during his third year of art school, Smith enrolled in the Royal Winnipeg Rifles. Before going overseas for war service, he took a vacation in Vancouver where he met and married Marion Fleming. In 1942, he joined the Princess Patricia's Canadian Light Infantry. He was first a lieutenant, then a Platoon Commander and then the Intelligence Officer. In 1943, he was badly injured while landing at the beach in Leon Forte, Sicily.

== Art career ==
In 1944, Smith returned to Vancouver where the Vancouver Art Gallery had a solo show for the work he produced overseas. He also attended the Vancouver School of Art in the same year to complete the fourth year of his art degree. From 1945 to 1954, Smith taught at the Vancouver School of Art. In 1947, he had his second solo show at the Vancouver Art Gallery. In 1951, he studied at the California School of Fine Arts with Elmer Bischoff and learned of American artists such as Clyfford Still, Richard Diebenkorn and others. In 1957, he went to Harvard to study and met Walter Gropius, the architect who founded the Bauhaus School. In the mid-to-late fifties, he painted abstractions with thick black-line grids and structures, but his work constantly evolved later.

In 1960, he was chosen to represent Canada at the São Paulo Biennial. In 1965, at the request of Arthur Erickson, Smith designed two murals for Erickson's new Simon Fraser University campus building. The work, titled Mosaic Mural, is permanently installed along the sides of the west academic quadrangle. For EXPO '70 in Osaka, Japan, he was commissioned by Erickson to create an artwork for the Canadian Pavilion. After this project and trips to Egypt, the U.S. and Europe, Smith developed his Seawall series with a composition composed of horizontal bands and used it for ocean vistas.

In 1956, Smith was invited to train teachers in the new faculty of education at UBC. He taught for 26 years there until retiring in 1982, then formed the foundation Artists for Kids Trust, to benefit children’s art education.

== Awards and honours ==
In 1995, Smith won the "Structure with Red Sun Award". He was named a member of the Order of Canada in 1996. He was an Education Professor Emeritus at the University of British Columbia (UBC). In 2007, he received the Audain Prize for Lifetime Achievement in the Visual Arts. In March 2009, at the National Gallery of Canada in Ottawa, he was named a laureate and presented with the Governor General's Award in the Visual and Media Arts. He was made a member of the Royal Canadian Academy of Arts

== Collections ==
Smith's works are included in the collections of the following museums:

- Musée national des beaux-arts du Québec
- National Gallery of Canada in Ottawa
- the Smithsonian Institution in Washington D.C.
- Victoria and Albert Museum in London, England
- Vancouver Art Gallery

In 2009 his massive wall sculpture Beach Tangle was installed in the lobby of the West Vancouver Community Centre, one of the venues for celebration during the 2010 Winter Olympic Games.

== Personal life ==
In 1953, Gordon and Marion Smith moved to the North Shore of Vancouver into their first commissioned house from the architect Arthur Erickson. The need for a larger studio space prompted them to move to a second new house in West Vancouver, commissioned by friend Erickson in 1966. After Marion's death in 2009, Smith continued to live and work in their home. He died in Vancouver on January 18, 2020, at the age of 100.
