= Paul Wong (artist) =

Canadian artist and curator

Paul M Wong
- Paul Wong with the book Enemy Alien: Tamio Wakayama
- Born: 20 November 1954 (age 71); Prince Rupert, British Columbia, Canada
- Known for: Video artist, multimedia artist
- Website: Paul Wong Projects

Paul Wong (born November 20, 1954) is a Canadian visual and media artist and curator based in Vancouver, British Columbia. He is the inaugural Parliamentary Visual Artist Laureate of Canada, appointed in 2026 for a two-year term beginning September 1.

Wong is a pioneering figure in Canadian video and media art and an important figure in the development of artist-run culture in Canada. He was a member of the Mainstreeters, a Vancouver-based artist collective active in the 1970s and early 1980s, and a co-founding director of the Satellite Video Exchange Society, now VIVO Media Arts Centre, established in 1973. He is the director of On Main Gallery.

His interdisciplinary practice encompasses film, video, photography, installation, sculpture, performance, public art, neon art, printmaking and writing. His work has explored identity, race, sexuality and the body, and has challenged conventional boundaries between art, media and public space.

Wong's work has been exhibited internationally, including at the Museum of Modern Art in New York, the National Gallery of Canada and the Venice Biennale. He has received the Governor General's Awards in Visual and Media Arts, the Audain Prize for Lifetime Achievement in the Visual Arts and numerous other honours.

== Collections ==
Wong's works are held in public collections including the National Gallery of Canada, the Museum of Modern Art in New York, the Canada Council Art Bank, the Audain Art Museum in Whistler, the Vancouver Art Gallery, and the Whitney Museum of American Art in New York.

== Awards and honours ==
- 1992 — Canada Council Bell Canada Award in Video Art.
- 2002 — Transforming Art Award from the Asian Heritage Foundation; Wong was the inaugural recipient.
- 2003 — Trailblazer Expressions Award; Wong was the inaugural recipient.
- 2005 — Governor General's Awards in Visual and Media Arts.
- 2008 — Best Canadian Film or Video Award at the Toronto Reel Asian International Film Festival for Perfect Day.
- 2016 — Audain Prize for Lifetime Achievement in the Visual Arts.
- 2022 — Occupying Chinatown, a book by Wong, Debbie Cheung and Christopher Lee, was a finalist for the City of Vancouver Book Award.
- 2023 — Outstanding Artist Award from the Federation of Gay Games.
- 2023 — Honorary Doctorate of Letters (honoris causa) from Emily Carr University of Art and Design.
- 2024 — Reel Asian Fire Horse Award.
- 2024–2025 — University of British Columbia Artist in Residence in the Department of Art History, Visual Art and Theory.
- 2026 — Roderick Haig-Brown Regional Prize at the BC and Yukon Book Prizes for Enemy Alien: Tamio Wakayama, which Wong edited.
- 2026 — Appointed the inaugural Parliamentary Visual Artist Laureate of Canada for a two-year term beginning September 1, 2026.

== Selected projects ==
=== Confused: Sexual Views (1984) ===
A four-channel video installation consisting of approximately nine hours of interviews with 27 people discussing sexuality, bisexuality, intimacy, relationships and desire. The work was commissioned by the Vancouver Art Gallery for its video space, but the Gallery cancelled the exhibition shortly before its scheduled opening, with director Luke Rombout declaring the work "not art". The cancellation triggered a major censorship controversy, generating widespread media attention and protests, and led to a two-year legal battle between Wong and the Gallery. The controversy galvanized artists and supporters across Canada and became a focal point for anti-censorship advocacy. Although Wong ultimately lost the court battle, he subsequently boycotted the Vancouver Art Gallery for 18 years. In 2002, the Gallery acquired Confused: Sexual Views for its permanent collection and exhibited the work.

=== 5 (2010) ===
A series of five site-specific installations presented during the 2010 Olympic and Paralympic Winter Games in Vancouver, commissioned by the City of Vancouver through its Olympic and Paralympic Public Art Program.

=== Mainstreeters: Taking Advantage, 1972–1982 (2015) ===
An exhibition, website and publication examining the Mainstreeters, a Vancouver-based artist collective of which Wong was a member. The project brought attention to an under-recognized chapter of Vancouver art history and documented the group's experimentation with video, photography, performance and alternative culture.

=== Five Octave Range (2017) ===
A site-specific four-channel video installation commissioned by Vancouver Opera for the 2017 Vancouver Opera Festival. The work featured four singers and explored vocalization, gesture, repetition, resonance and abstraction.

=== Mother's Cupboard (2018) ===
A series of photographs documenting a collection of Chinese herbs and medicines stored in jars by Wong's mother, Suk-Fong. The work was commissioned through the City of Vancouver's Public Art Program and developed as part of Occupying Chinatown.

=== Occupying Chinatown (2018–21) ===
A multidisciplinary project originating in Wong's year-long residency at the Dr. Sun Yat-Sen Classical Chinese Garden, exploring Chinese-Canadian identity, family history, memory and Vancouver's Chinatown. The project resulted in exhibitions, public art, performances and events, as well as the 2021 bilingual book Occupying Chinatown, which documents several of Wong's major works and his engagement with Chinese-Canadian communities. The book was a finalist for the City of Vancouver Book Award in 2022.

=== Enemy Alien: Tamio Wakayama (2025–26) ===
A major exhibition of photographer Tamio Wakayama at the Vancouver Art Gallery, curated by Wong. Wong also edited the accompanying book, Enemy Alien: Tamio Wakayama, published by the Vancouver Art Gallery and Figure 1 Publishing. The book won the 2026 Roderick Haig-Brown Regional Prize at the BC and Yukon Book Prizes.

== Television ==
Wong has worked in television as an artist, filmmaker and performer. His television appearances include Adrienne Clarkson Presents, Through the Lens, Diversity, Studio 4 and Breakfast Television.

In 1996, Wong appeared as the Wiry Man in "Hell Money", the nineteenth episode of the third season of the American television series The X-Files. The episode premiered on March 29, 1996, and was filmed in Vancouver.

Wong has also created television works addressing racism, immigration and Chinese Canadian identity. In 2000, he created Refugee Class of 2000, a series of three television advertisements commissioned by the Canadian Race Relations Foundation as part of its Unite Against Racism campaign. The advertisements began airing nationally in January 2000 and featured 34 Grade 12 students from Sir Charles Tupper Secondary School in Vancouver.

In 2019, Wong created 限华 Chinese Only Television Bumpers, a series of six ten-second television bumpers addressing Chinese Canadian history and identity. The works were subsequently included in the exhibition Whose Chinatown? at Griffin Art Projects.

In 2024, Wong revisited his involvement with The X-Files in Hell Money, The X-Files: An Homage to Graeme Murray, a multimedia installation presented as part of The Prop House: A Collection of One Million Objects at Griffin Art Projects. The work reflected Wong's continued engagement with television and film production within his artistic practice.
