= On Main Gallery =

- Established: 1985
- Location: Main Street, Vancouver, British Columbia, Canada
- Type: art gallery
- Director: Paul Wong
- Curator: By Committee
- Website: On Main Gallery

On Main Gallery is a contemporary art center in Vancouver, BC, with a focus on Canadian artists. The organization presents projects in both conventional and unconventional art spaces, with many projects shown off-site, or in non-traditional gallery settings.

== History ==
Established in 1985 as On Edge (On The Cutting Edge Productions Society), the society came out of a direct response to the lack of initiatives in presenting contemporary media arts around issues of diversity and interdisciplinary practices. On Edge played a role in the careers of many emerging, mid-career, and established artists, exhibiting shows locally, nationally, and internationally. In addition, the gallery participated in key conferences and symposiums, and worked as advisors and consultants to organizations and educational institutions around issues of diversity and new media art practices.

In 2007, On Edge rebranded to On Main, shifting focus towards on the local community of Vancouver art and artists. The gallery emphasized collaborations and partnerships with both non-profit and private sectors, and these partnerships have been helping the gallery with outreach to new audiences and communities. On Main partnered with the City of Vancouver, InTransitBC, the City of Richmond, and the 2010 Winter Olympics, producing and presenting public art projects in new ways to an audience of hundreds of thousands.
