= Alma Mater Society of the University of British Columbia Vancouver =

- Abbreviation: AMS of UBC Vancouver
- Formation: October 15, 1915
- Type: Student Society
- Legal status: Non-profit society
- Headquarters: 6133 University Blvd. Vancouver, BC, Canada
- Location: Vancouver, British Columbia
- Members: approx. 60,000
- President: Dylan Evans
- Board of directors: AMS Student Council
- Budget: $34 Million CAD
- Staff: 690
- Volunteers: approx. 100
- Website: www.ams.ubc.ca

The Alma Mater Society of the University of British Columbia Vancouver (otherwise referred to as the Alma Mater Society or the AMS) is the student society of UBC Vancouver and represents more than 60,000 undergraduate and graduate students at UBC's Vancouver campus and their affiliated colleges. The AMS also operates student services, businesses, resource groups and clubs. The AMS is a non-profit organization that exists to advocate for student viewpoints and ensure the needs of students are met by the University Administration and the Provincial and Federal governments. The Alma Mater Society is composed of a number of constituency organizations for undergraduate students, and works closely with the Graduate Student Society of UBC.

== Governance ==
The highest decision-making body of the AMS is the Student Council. Meeting every two weeks during the Academic Year, and every month during the summer, this body has representatives from each of the Schools and Faculties of UBC, the affiliate colleges: Regent College, Vancouver School of Theology, and St. Mark's College, Vancouver as well as the six members of the Executive, and several non-voting positions including the two representatives of the Student Senate Caucus, the two Vancouver student members of the UBC Board of Governors, the Student Services Manager, and the Ombudsperson. Voting members of Council are the Directors of the Society (as defined under the Society Act of British Columbia) and are responsible for all high-level financial and legal decisions made by the AMS - including the overseeing of internal procedures (known as the Code of Procedure), a $34 million budget, and the Student Union Building (known as the AMS Nest Building).

The operations of the AMS are governed by a six-member Executive, as well as a professional Managing Director, and the Senior Manager of Student Services. The Executive consists of the President, the Vice-President Academic and University Affairs, the Vice-President Finance, the Vice-President Administration, the Vice-President External Affairs, and the Vice-President Student Life (added in 2025). Members of the Executive are elected in a campus-wide election each March, along with five Senators-at-Large to the UBC Senate, and two student representatives to the UBC Board of Governors.

=== Elections ===
Until February 2004, candidates running for Executive positions ran as part of a slate. The 2005 AMS election was the first election which the AMS saw electoral candidates run as independents. Past slates included Students for Students (more right-leaning candidates with strong support from athletes, fraternities and residences), Action Now/Students' Voice/SPAN-Student Progressive Action Network (more left-leaning candidates with strong support from students living off-campus, the safety community and resource groups) and the Radical Beer Faction (the longest-running slate in AMS history).

The AMS elections have been characterized by low turnout. A number of initiatives have been undertaken to improve the level of engagement with the student society, and increase turnout levels. Voter Funded Media and the introduction of Condorcet method style voting for executive positions. Turnout in the 2009 election improved to 14.4%. Most recently, a 2013 Elections when the continuation of UPass was put on the referendum, AMS recorded a historic high of voter turnout was 43.9%

=== Clubs & Societies ===
The AMS oversees over 400 student clubs. The Clubs & Societies Committee sets out procedures for constituting clubs and manages use of space by clubs within the Student Union Building as well as the general operation of AMS Clubs. They have the power to constitute or de-constitute a club, as well as direct a club to take actions in order to ensure rules and regulations are followed accordingly.

The committee is chaired by the Vice President Administration of the AMS. It also has several AMS Directors and member at large sitting in the committee.

== Initiatives and services ==
One of the major projects that the AMS has undertaken is the New SUB Project in order to increase available space for student activities by 50% compared to the old Student Union Building. The initiative was approved by referendum in April 2008 and construction began in 2012. The building is funded by an incremental increase in student fees, which supplied roughly $80 million for the construction of the building. More commonly referred to as the AMS Nest, or simply the Nest, the building has 250,000 square feet (23,000 m^{2}) of space, costing about $108.3 million (with $25 million from the university). The building opened during the summer of 2015.

The AMS runs many services for students on the UBC campus, including the Sexual Assault Support Centre (SASC), AMS Peer Support, the AMS Advocacy Office, the AMS Food Bank, AMS Tutoring, AMS Housing, AMS Entrepreneurship Hub (eHub), AMS Health and Dental, and Safewalk, a service for escorting students on campus safely. In addition, the AMS lobbies local and provincial governments and institutions for the benefit of the student body. For example, the AMS lobbied against the $16 million funding cuts to B.C. post-secondary institutions in 2009.

On September 25, 2012, the AMS founded Get OnBoard BC, a coalition of transit stakeholders in the Metro Vancouver region to lobby for increases to public transit funding. The organization continues to exist today as a separate registered not for profit under the BC Societies Act.

== Representation ==
By paying student fees, a student becomes a member of the AMS. Membership entitles students to vote in AMS elections and referendums, and utilize the many services that are provided by the student society and the university.

In addition to being a member of the AMS, any UBC student is a member the respective constituent society that represents all the students in a given faculty. These groups, including the Arts Undergraduate Society, Science Undergraduate Society, Commerce Undergraduate Society and Engineering Undergraduate Society (the big four), as well as the hold the elections for their respective seats on AMS Council. Unlike the undergraduate programs with direct elections, Graduate Student seats on AMS council are appointed by the council of the Graduate Student Society, which is recognized by the University as the representative body of graduate students.

The AMS was a founding member of the Canadian Alliance of Student Associations. Due to scandal, the AMS withdrew from CASA in the late 1990s, but later rejoined. In 2008, AMS Council voted to step down to Associate Membership, citing concerns over centralized control, costs and value. In October 2009, AMS Council voted to withdraw entirely from the Canadian Alliance of Student Associations, however, this decision was overturned on March 31, 2010, until the AMS ultimately withdrew entirely in November 2011. The AMS is currently affiliated with the Undergraduates of Canadian Research Intensive Universities and voted to become a full member of the federal student coalition in May, 2021.

On December 1, 2013, the AMS formally founded the Alliance of British Columbia Students, a not for profit confederation of British Columbia student societies advocating for a better post-secondary landscape in BC. The organization at the time represented nine student associations. The AMS voted to leave the ABCS in 2015. Though the AMS is not affiliated with any provincial student federation, it has worked with the Simon Fraser Student Society and the BC Federation of Students to lobby the provincial government.

== See also ==
- List of British Columbia students' associations
- AMS Art Collection
