= Takao Tanabe =

Canadian artist (born 1926)

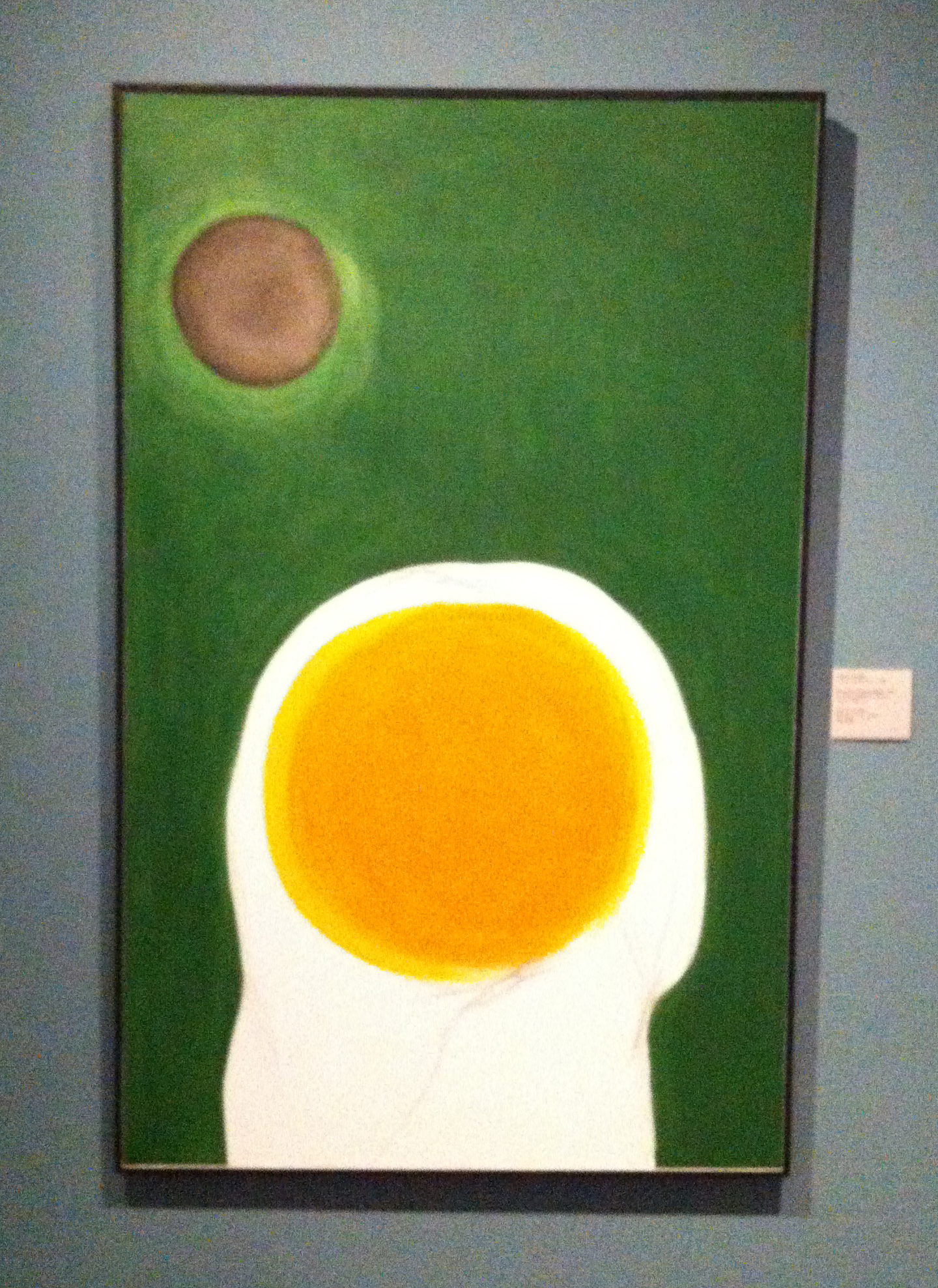
- Egg and Moon by Takao Tanabe; Art Gallery of Nova Scotia
- Born: Takao Izumi; 16 September 1926 (age 100); Seal Cove, British Columbia, Canada
- Education: Winnipeg School of Art, Winnipeg, Manitoba (1946–1949), studying with Lionel LeMoine FitzGerald, and Joseph Plaskett; Brooklyn Museum Art School, New York City, New York with Hans Hofmann (1951) and Reuben Tam (1951–1952); Central School of Arts and Crafts, London, UK (1953–1954); studied Sumi-e and calligraphy at Tokyo University in Japan
- Spouse: Anona Thorne
- Awards: Order of Canada, Order of British Columbia, Governor General's Awards in Visual and Media Arts; Audain Prize for Lifetime Achievement in the Visual Arts,
- Elected: Member, Royal Canadian Academy of Arts

Takao Tanabe, CM OBC RCA (born 16 September 1926) is a Canadian artist who painted abstractly for decades, but over time, his paintings became nature-based.

== Biography ==
Born Takao Izumi in Seal Cove, today part of Prince Rupert, British Columbia, the son of a commercial fisherman, where he was the fifth of seven children. Tanabe and his family were interned with other Japanese-Canadians in the British Columbia interior during World War II. They were relocated first to a camp at Hasting Park in Vancouver and Lemon Creek in the Kootenays in the summer of 1942, where they were expected to build their own internment camp.

Tanabe attended the Winnipeg School of Art, Winnipeg, Manitoba (1946–1949), initially enrolling in a sign painting class as it would provide him with employable skills before becoming fascinated with art's potential outside of a commercial context. Tanabe studied in this period with Joseph Plaskett, who introduced the young artist to the work of Pablo Picasso and Henri Matisse and became a friend of Tanabe's for life. He then studied at the Brooklyn Museum Art School, New York City, New York with Hans Hofmann (1951) and Reuben Tam (1951–1952). Upon returning to Vancouver in 1952, Tanabe took up mural painting and completed his first commissioned work, a mural for the University of British Columbia Art Gallery entitled The World We Live In in 1953. Tanabe received an Emily Carr Scholarship that same year; the news was delivered to him in a phone call from Lawren Harris. He went to the Central School of Arts and Crafts, London, UK (1953–1954) and during that time travelled widely in Europe. From 1959 to 1960, he studied Sumi-e and calligraphy at Tokyo University in Japan on a Canada Council Scholarship.

His works are in public and private collections, including the Audain Art Museum, the National Gallery of Canada, the Glenbow Museum, the Vancouver Art Gallery, the Canada Council Art Bank, the Art Gallery of Greater Victoria and the Art Gallery of Ontario.

== Career ==
His art has gone through many different phases. In his "inscapes" (he called his paintings after a term used by Gerard Manley Hopkins) of the late 1950s, Tanabe explored his memories of lit interiors, painting them abstractly and expressing them with calligraphic signs. His works of this period often blur the line between figurative and abstract painting.

From 1961 to 1968, Tanabe taught at the Vancouver Art School. Throughout the 1960s, he became well-established in the Vancouver art world and continued to exhibit his work across Canada, painting more large-scale murals in Ottawa, Winnipeg, Regina, and Edmonton. In 1968, he worked in Philadelphia, moving in 1969 to New York City where he lived until 1972. In New York, he painted hard-edge geometric abstracts. From 1973, he was head of the art program and artist-in-residence at the Banff Centre for the Arts. By then, he consciously considered landscapes as a subject, while progressively eliminating references to the specific. In 1980, he returned to British Columbia where he lives and works on Vancouver Island. He is considered today a painter who primarily evokes the landscape of British Columbia in minimalist but detailed paintings.

In 2005, a major retrospective of his work curated by Ian Thom was organized and circulated by the Art Gallery of Greater Victoria and Vancouver Art Gallery.

In 2014, Tanabe said:

...I try to avoid brush marks so that it looks as though the paint has just floated on...

== Major solo exhibitions ==
- Takao Tanabe: Inside Passage (2026), retrospective co-curated by the Audain Art Museum in Whistler, BC; National Gallery of Canada and Art Gallery of Greater Victoria, British Columbia
- Early Works (2025), Equinox Gallery, Vancouver, British Columbia
- Printmaker (2023), Kelowna Art Gallery, Kelowna, British Columbia
- A Modern Landscape (2021), West Vancouver Art Museum, West Vancouver, British Columbia
- Sumie: Ink Brush Paintings (2016), Nikkei National Museum & Cultural Centre, Burnaby, British Columbia
- Chronicles of Form and Place: Works on Paper (2011), Burnaby Art Gallery (touring exhibition, to McMaster Museum of Art, Hamilton; Nanaimo Art Gallery; The Reach, Abbotsford)
- Mountains in Winter (2009), Whyte Museum of the Canadian Rockies, Banff (touring exhibition, to Penticton Art Gallery; West Vancouver Art Museum)
- Takao Tanabe (2005), Vancouver Art Gallery (touring exhibition, to Art Gallery of Greater Victoria; Art Gallery of Nova Scotia, Halifax; McMichael Canadian Art Collection, Kleinburg, Ontario)

== Awards and honours ==
- Member of the Order of Canada
- Order of British Columbia
- Two honorary doctorates
- Governor General's Award in Visual and Media Arts
- Member, Royal Canadian Academy of Arts
- Audain Prize for Lifetime Achievement in the Visual Arts (2013)

== Record sale prices ==
At the Heffel auction of Post-War & Contemporary Art, May 23, 2024, Lot 004, Nootka 1/91: in Hanna Channel, acrylic on canvas, 27 x 59 in, 68.6 x 149.9 cm, Estimate: $60,000 - $80,000 CAD, Sold for: $451,250 (including Buyer's Premium).
