= Jim Hart (artist) =

Canadian sculptor

Jim Hart 7IDANsuu (Haida)
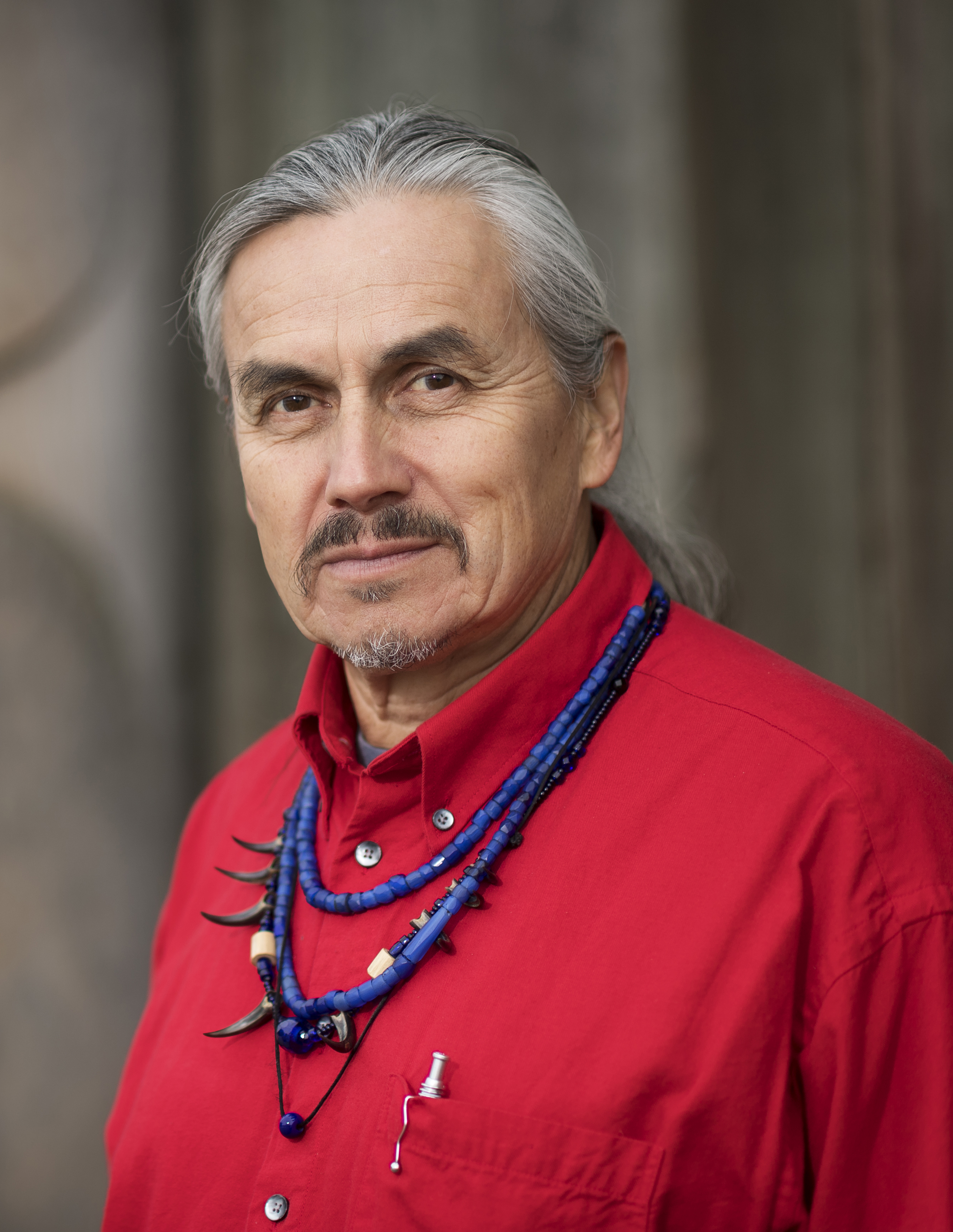
- Hart in 2017
- Born: 1952 (age 73–74); Masset, Haida Gwaii, British Columbia
- Occupations: Hereditary Chief of Haida; Carver
- Known for: Working in bronze and wood
- Notable work: Reconciliation Pole – UBC, 2017; Frog Constellation – SFU, 1995
- Awards: Officer of the Order of Canada (2023); Order of British Columbia (2003)

James Hart OC OBC RCA (Haida: 7IDANsuu, pronounced /ʔiː.dæn.suː/; born in the early 1950s) is a Canadian and Haida artist and a chief of the Haida Nation.

== Biography ==
Hart was born in Masset, Haida Gwaii, British Columbia. His mother, Joan Hart, is the granddaughter of Charles Edenshaw. His father was European, allowing Hart to escape the Canadian Indian residential school system that many Haida of his time were sent to. Instead, he grew up with his grandparents and became a fisherman.

Hart discovered his passion for Haida art in high school. He began carving seriously in 1979. Hart first apprenticed with Robert Davidson in 1978 to help construct a set of totem poles. From 1980 to 1984 he became an assistant to Bill Reid in Vancouver, who by then was too seriously afflicted with Parkinson's disease to do much of his own carving. He began his work with Reid by putting the finishing details on The Raven and the First Man, a centerpiece of the Museum of Anthropology at UBC, and he also assisted on Reid's Spirit of Haida Gwaii / The Jade Canoe.

Hart lives in both Vancouver and Haida Gwaii. In Haida Gwaii, he is known as ˀIdansuu, a hereditary chief name that he received in 1999 after it had earlier been held by Charles Edenshaw. As chief he belongs to the Hereditary Chiefs Council of the Haida Nation.

== Works ==
Hart was the first Northwest Coast artist to use bronze, beginning in 1982, and he has also made works in silver and gold. In 1988, he supervised the construction of the Haida house in the Canadian Museum of Civilization.

A 1995 wood sculpture that Hart considers to be his equivalent of a doctoral thesis, Frog Constellation, depicts two people on the back of a giant frog; it was installed in 2012 on the campus of Simon Fraser University. The Dance Screen, a large wood carving that he began designing in 2009, was installed in 2012 as a temporary exhibit in the Vancouver Art Gallery. Jim Hart's The Dance Screen (The Scream Too) was put on permanent display at the Audain Art Museum in Whistler and inaugurated in 2018. Another of Hart's works, a totem pole called the Respect to Bill Reid Pole, is part of the outdoor Haida village at the Museum of Anthropology at UBC. A bronze sculpture by Hart, The Three Watchmen, is part of the collection of the National Gallery of Canada, and can now be found at the Plains of Abraham in Quebec.

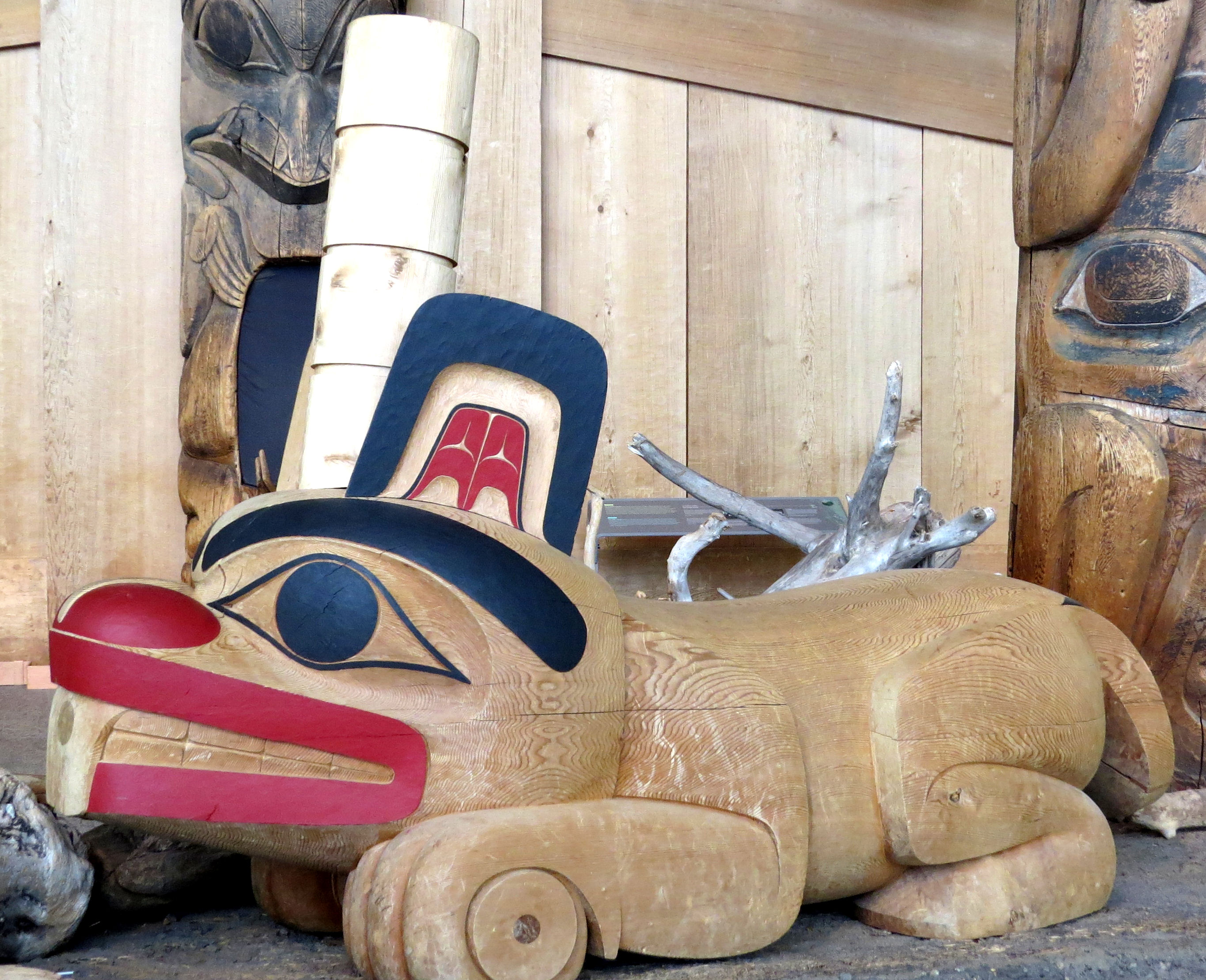
Beaver "Manda", 1995, Canadian Museum of History

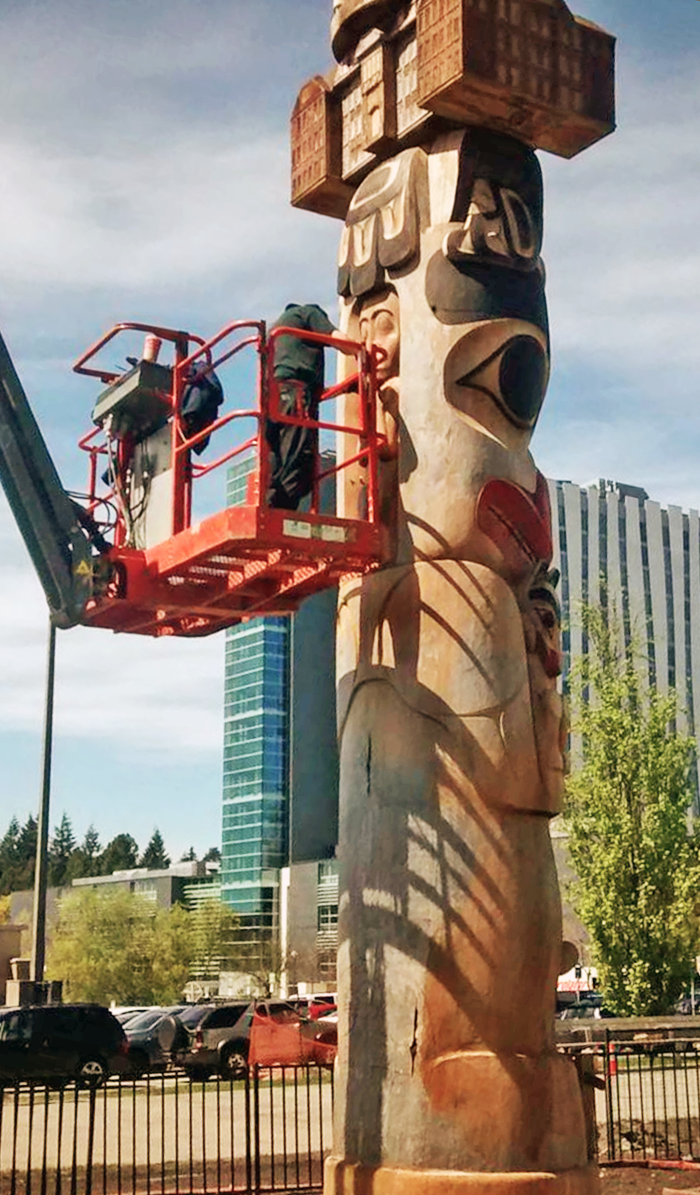
7idansuu carving the Reconciliation Pole at UBC

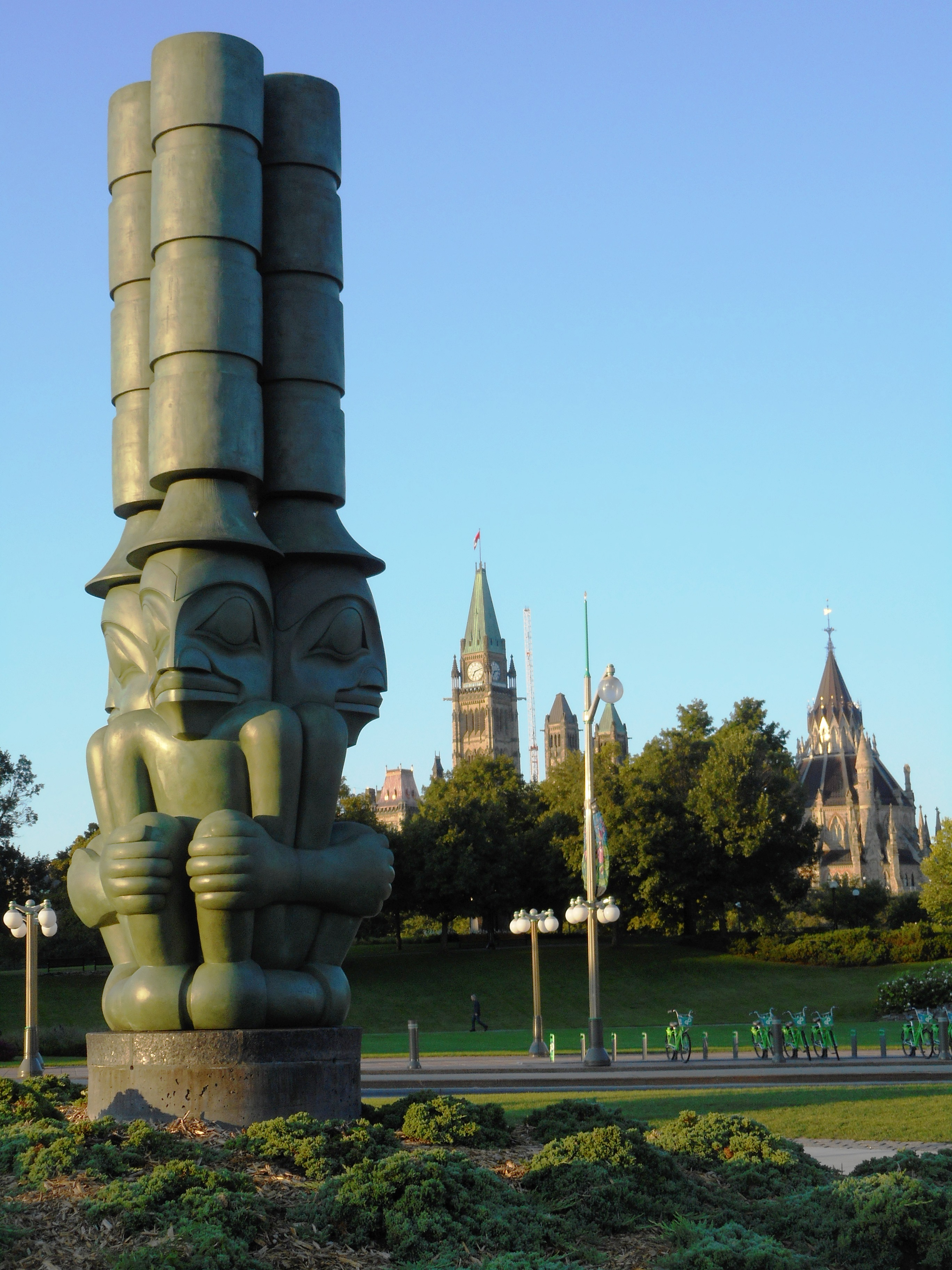
The Three Watchmen, Ottawa

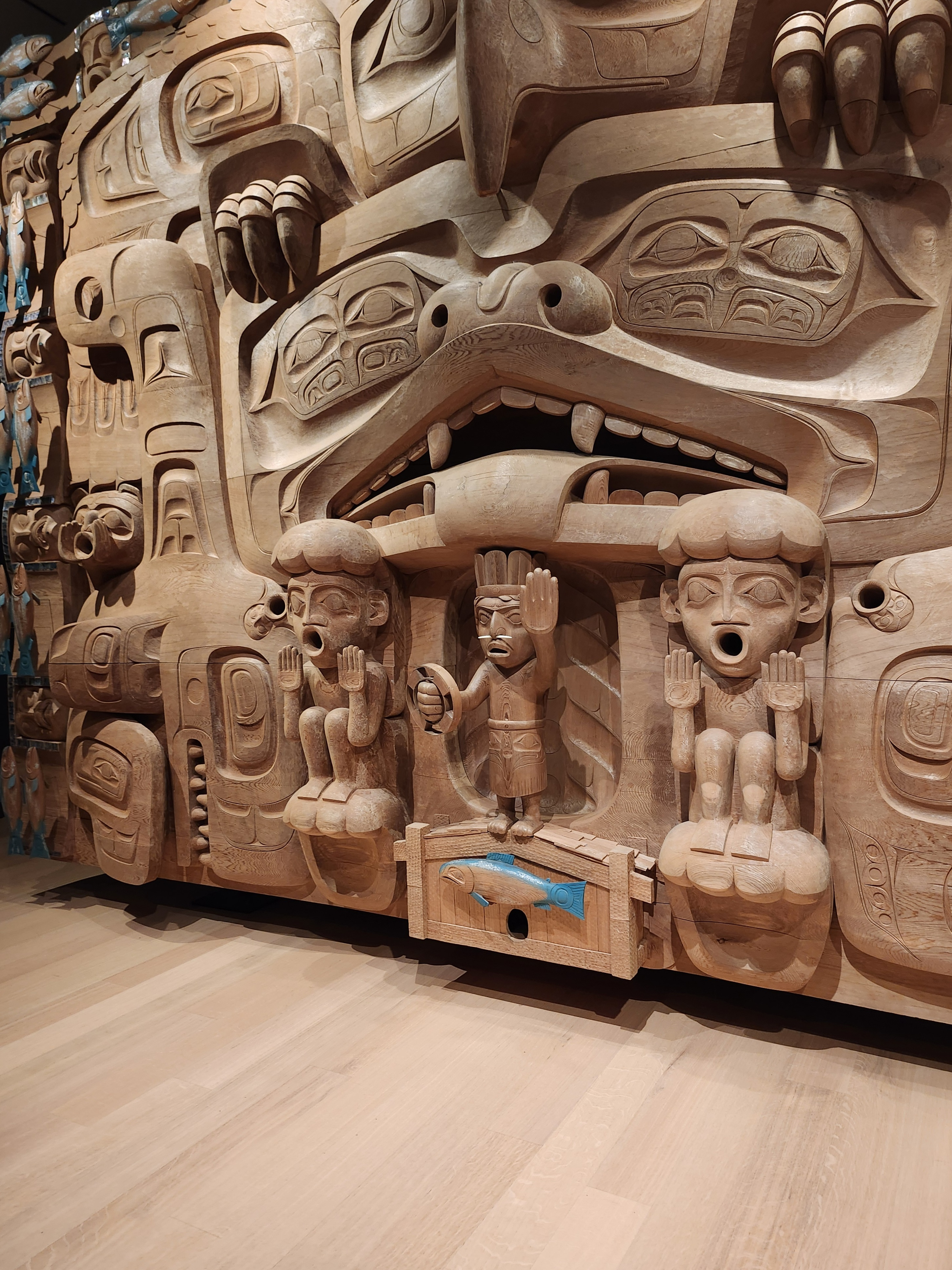
The Dance Screen (The Scream Too), Audain Art Museum

== Awards and honours ==
Hart was awarded the Order of British Columbia in 2003 and was appointed to the Order of Canada in June 2023. He received a Queen's Diamond Jubilee Medal in 2013.

He holds an honorary doctorate from the Emily Carr University of Art and Design and was also awarded an honorary degree from Simon Fraser University in 2017.
