= Fred Herzog =

Canadian photographer (1930–2019)

- Herzog in 2015
- Born: Ulrich Herzog; September 21, 1930; Stuttgart, Germany
- Died: September 9, 2019 (aged 88); Vancouver, British Columbia
- Known for: Colour photographer, who captured Vancouver street scenes
- Awards: Audain Prize for Lifetime Achievement in the Visual Arts; 2014
- Website: www.equinoxgallery.com/artists/portfolio/fred-herzog

Fred Herzog D.F.A. (September 21, 1930 – September 9, 2019) was a German-born Canadian photographer, who devoted his artistic life to walking the streets of Vancouver as well as almost 40 countries with his Leica, and various Nikon, Kodak and Canon, photographing – mostly with colour slide film – his observations of the street life with all its complexities. Herzog did not achieve critical recognition until the 1990s, when his unusual early use of colour in art photography was recognized. He became celebrated internationally for his pioneering street photography, his understanding of the medium combined with, as he put it, "how you see and how you think" created the right moment to take a picture.

== Life and career ==
Fred was born Ulrich Herzog in Stuttgart, Germany, in 1930 and spent his childhood in Rottweil, Germany. He lost both of his parents during the war, and in 1946 Herzog went to work as an apprentice in his grandparents' hardware store. Disillusioned by the ravages of war and the situation in Germany, he emigrated to Canada in 1952 and settled in Vancouver in 1953. Herzog's first camera was given to him by an uncle who also had an interest in photography. The first camera he purchased was a Kodak Retina. During the next several years. Herzog studied photography magazines while working aboard ships for the CPR steamship line, and in 1957 he was hired as a medical photographer at St. Paul's Hospital. In 1961, he became the head of the Photo/Cine Division in the Department of Biomedical Communications at UBC, and in 1970 was appointed associate director of the department. Herzog was also hired as an Instructional Specialist in the Fine Arts Department at Simon Fraser University in 1967, and in 1969 became an instructor in the Fine Arts Department at UBC.

Herzog had a walking route through Vancouver that enabled him to build friendships with other photographers and neighbourhood residents and gave him an acute understanding of the daily life and soul of Vancouver. Over the course of several decades, Herzog produced a substantial body of colour photographs, taking urban life, second-hand shops, vacant lots, neon signage and the crowds of people who have populated city streets over the past years as his primary subjects. Herzog's use of colour was unusual in the 1950s and 60s, a time when fine art photography was almost exclusively associated with black and white imagery. Additionally, Herzog photographed using Kodachrome slide film that was notoriously difficult to print. For decades he remained virtually unknown until his mid-seventies when printing technology caught up, allowing him to make archival pigment prints that matched the exceptional colour and intensity of the Kodachrome film. By this time, Herzog had accumulated 100,000 or so colour slides that could at last be reproduced properly.

A retrospective exhibition, Fred Herzog: Vancouver Photographs, was held at the Vancouver Art Gallery in 2007 and was the first major recognition of Herzog's body of work. Herzog exhibited his work both in Canada and internationally, including the exhibitions Fred Herzog: Photographs, C/O Berlin, Germany (2010), Fred Herzog: A Retrospective, Equinox Gallery, Vancouver (2012), Eyes Wide Open! 100 Years of Leica Photography, Haus der Photographie, Hamburg, Germany (2015), Photography in Canada, 1960–2000, National Gallery of Canada, Ottawa (2017), and many others. In 2010 Herzog received an Honorary Doctorate from Emily Carr University of Art and Design, and in 2014 he received the Audain Prize for Lifetime Achievement in the Visual Arts. An artist profile on Herzog was featured on the Knowledge Network for the series Snapshot: The Art of Photography II in 2011. In 2014, Herzog's photograph Bogner's Grocery (1960) was released as a limited edition stamp as part of Canada Post's Canadian Photography Series.

Herzog died on September 9, 2019, at age 88.

== Publications ==
- Fred Herzog: Vancouver Photographs. Vancouver: Douglas & McIntyre; Vancouver Art Gallery, 2007. ISBN 978-1-55365-255-7. Edited by Grant Arnold and Michael Turner.
- Fred Herzog: Photographs. Vancouver: Douglas & McIntyre, 2011. ISBN 978-1-55365-558-9. With essays by Claudia Gochmann, Sarah Milroy, Jeff Wall and Douglas Coupland.
- Fred Herzog: Photographs. Berlin: Hatje Cantz, 2011. ISBN 978-3-7757-2811-9. Curated by Stephen Waddell and Felix Hoffmann and edited by Hoffmann. Text in English and German.
- Fred Herzog: Modern Color. Berlin: Hatje Cantz, 2017. ISBN 978-3-7757-4181-1. With essays by David Campany and Hans-Michael Koetzle.
- Photography in Canada, 1839–1989: An Illustrated History. Toronto: Art Canada Institute, 2023. ISBN 978-1-4871-0309-5 Sarah Bassnett and Sarah Parsons.

== Exhibitions ==
- Fred Herzog: Vancouver Photographs, Vancouver Art Gallery, Vancouver, British Columbia, Canada, 2007.
- Fred Herzog: Photographs, C/O Berlin, Berlin, Germany, 2010.
- Fred Herzog: A Retrospective, Equinox Gallery, Vancouver, British Columbia, Canada, 2012.
- Eyes Wide Open! 100 Years of Lucia Photography, Haus der Photographie, Hamburg, Germany, 2015.
- Photography in Canada, 1960–2000, National Gallery of Canada, Ottawa, Ontario, Canada, 2017.

== Awards ==
- 2014: Audain Prize for Lifetime Achievement in the Visual Arts, Audain Art Museum, Canada

== See also ==
- List of German Canadians
