= Lionel Thomas (artist) =

Canadian artist (1915–2009)

- Born: Lionel Arthur John Thomas; April 3, 1915; Toronto, Ontario
- Died: May 6, 2005 (aged 90); Sechelt, British Columbia
- Education: Ontario College of Art (1936-37), the Hans Hofmann School of Fine Arts (1947) and the California School of Fine Arts (1949)
- Known for: abstract painting; public artworks in Vancouver, B.C., educator
- Spouse: Patricia (nee Simmons) b.1919 (artist) (m. 1940)

Lionel Thomas (April 03, 1915 – May 06, 2005) was a painter, muralist, designer, sculptor, printmaker and educator. He was best known for the public artworks he, often with his wife Patricia (née Simmons), created for architecture in Vancouver and elsewhere. He taught for almost four decades at two art schools, first at the Vancouver School of Art (now Emily Carr University of Art and Design) and then at the University of British Columbia.

== Career ==
Thomas was born in Toronto, Ontario. He studied at several different art schools, among them the Ontario College of Art (1936–37). Having met his wife in Toronto, they moved to Vancouver in 1940 where he taught at the Vancouver School of Art (now Emily Carr University of Art and Design) (1944–1950). While there, he won two scholarships at the graduate level. The first in 1947 took him to the Hans Hofmann School of Fine Arts in Provincetown, the second in 1949, took him to the California School of Fine Arts in San Francisco where he studied with Mark Rothko and Ernst Mundt. These courses of study interested him in abstraction and design. When he returned to Vancouver, he taught at the School of Architecture, University of British Columbia (UBC) (1950–1959), and as an associate professor in Fine Arts at UBC until 1981.

He exhibited nationally and internationally during the 1940s-1970s including at the Seattle Art Museum (1943 and 1952), the Vancouver Art Gallery, and at the Montreal Museum of Fine Arts (1949), Hart House, University of Toronto (1950), the National Gallery of Canada (1953), in the São Paulo Biennial (1954), in New Delhi, India, (1957) and at the University of San Francisco (1960), among others.

In 1954, he received his first architectural commission to paint an 18 x 27 foot mural on linen for the Mercantile Bank of Canada in Vancouver which shifted his practice towards public art. From then on, he and his wife collaborated on combining the disciplines of architecture and fine art, and with other artists, worked at introducing these ideals of the modern art movement to Vancouver.

Later, he explored an interest in astronomy and outer space. In 2005, the University of British Columbia's Morris and Helen Belkin Art Gallery, Vancouver helped organize an exhibition featuring Lionel and Patricia Thomas' works. He died in 2005. In 2010, the West Vancouver Art Museum organized Lionel Thomas: Abstractions 1949–1990, an exhibition of his nature-inspired abstractions.

== Commissions ==
- Water Screen (1968), Lighting Fixtures (1968), The Big Tree (1968) [carved entrance doors], all at the Royal British Columbia Museum, Victoria, BC;
- Canada Geese, bronze fountain (1957), Edmonton City Hall, AB;
- Symbols from the Humanities (1963), enamelled cloisonne doors, St. Thomas More College, University of Saskatchewan, Saskatoon, SK;
- "The Whole Man" (1960),York University, Toronto, ON;
- "Christ the King" (1958), smalti mosaic mural, St. Paul's College, University of Manitoba, Winnipeg, MN
- "The Lion and St. Mark" (1957) on the exterior of St. Mark's College and Symbols for Education (1958), UBC, a collaboration with Patricia Thomas;

Patricia and Lionel Thomas worked on a number of artworks together including the mosaic for the Vancouver Public Library (no longer existing).

== Selected public collections ==
- National Gallery of Canada;
- Art Gallery of Greater Victoria, BC;
- Morris and Helen Belkin Art Gallery, UBC;
- Simon Fraser University (Burnaby);
- Vancouver Art Gallery;
- University of Victoria;
- West Vancouver Museum;

== Memberships ==
- Canadian Group of Painters;
- B.C. Society of Fine Arts (Member 1946–1957);
- Federation of Canadian Artists (Founding Member 1941);
- Royal Canadian Academy of Arts (ARCA 1960);

== Selected awards ==
- 1949, Emily Carr Trust Fund, Scholarship;
- 1952, Pacific Northwest Artists Exhibition Award, Seattle, WA, USA;
- 1956, Royal Architectural Institute of Canada, Gold Medal;
- 1981, Elected member of the Accademia Italia degli Arti e del Lavoro, Parma, Italy;
