= Audain Art Museum =

Art museum in Whistler, Canada

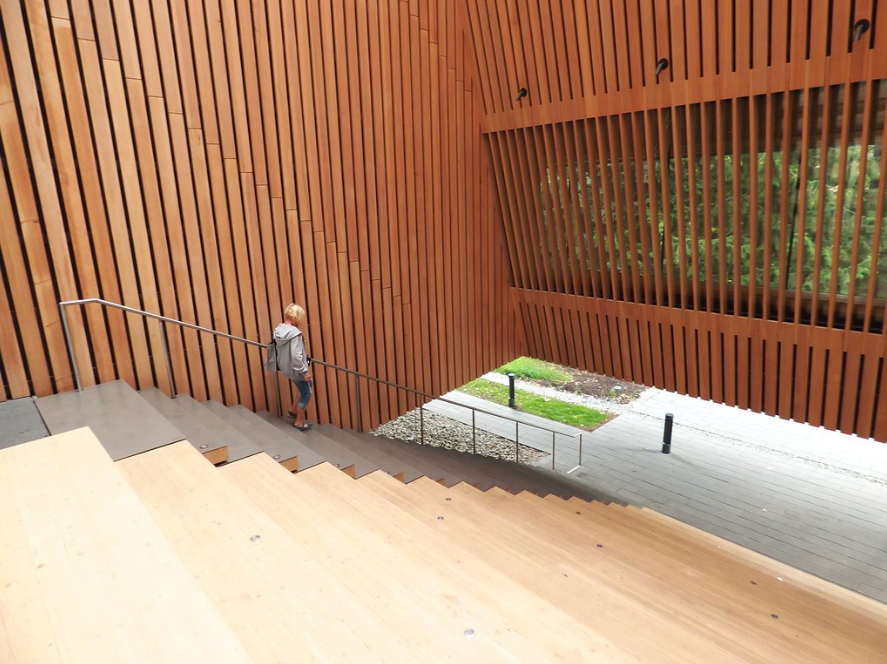
- View at the Audain Art Museum
- Established: 2016
- Location: Whistler, British Columbia, Canada
- Coordinates: 50.1179°N 122.9531°W
- Type: Art museum
- Key holdings: Emily Carr, Dana Claxton, Stan Douglas, Rodney Graham, E.J. Hughes, Marianne Nicolson, Gordon Smith, Jack Shadbolt, Jeff Wall
- Collections: Artworks from coastal British Columbia
- Collection size: 200
- Founder: Michael Audain
- Architect: Patkau Architects
- Website: audainartmuseum.com

The Audain Art Museum is a 56,000-square-foot private museum located in Whistler, British Columbia, Canada, that houses the private art collection of Michael Audain. Designed by Patkau Architects and opened to the public in 2016, it holds a comprehensive permanent collection of British Columbian art.

== Design ==
The site is moderately forested with mature spruce and cedar trees. In an effort to preserve the site's ecology only a single tree was removed during the initial phase of construction. The design is intended to blend into the existing site. Its cladding "is an intentionally recessive colour—it recedes into the shadows, and that's our view of the appropriate relationship between it and the context".

The museum's design was shaped by its function as a gallery, by the challenging site in the Fitzsimmons Creek floodplain which poses a flood risk, and the enormous amount of annual snowfall Whistler receives.

=== Awards ===
- 2017 Wood Design Honor Award
- 2017 AIBC Lieutenant Governor of British Columbia Medal in Architecture
- 2017 Azure AZ Award
- 2017 Canadian Wood Council Design Award
- 2018 RIBA Award for International Excellence
- 2018 Governor General's Medal in Architecture
- 2018 AIA Award – Architecture

== Permanent collection ==
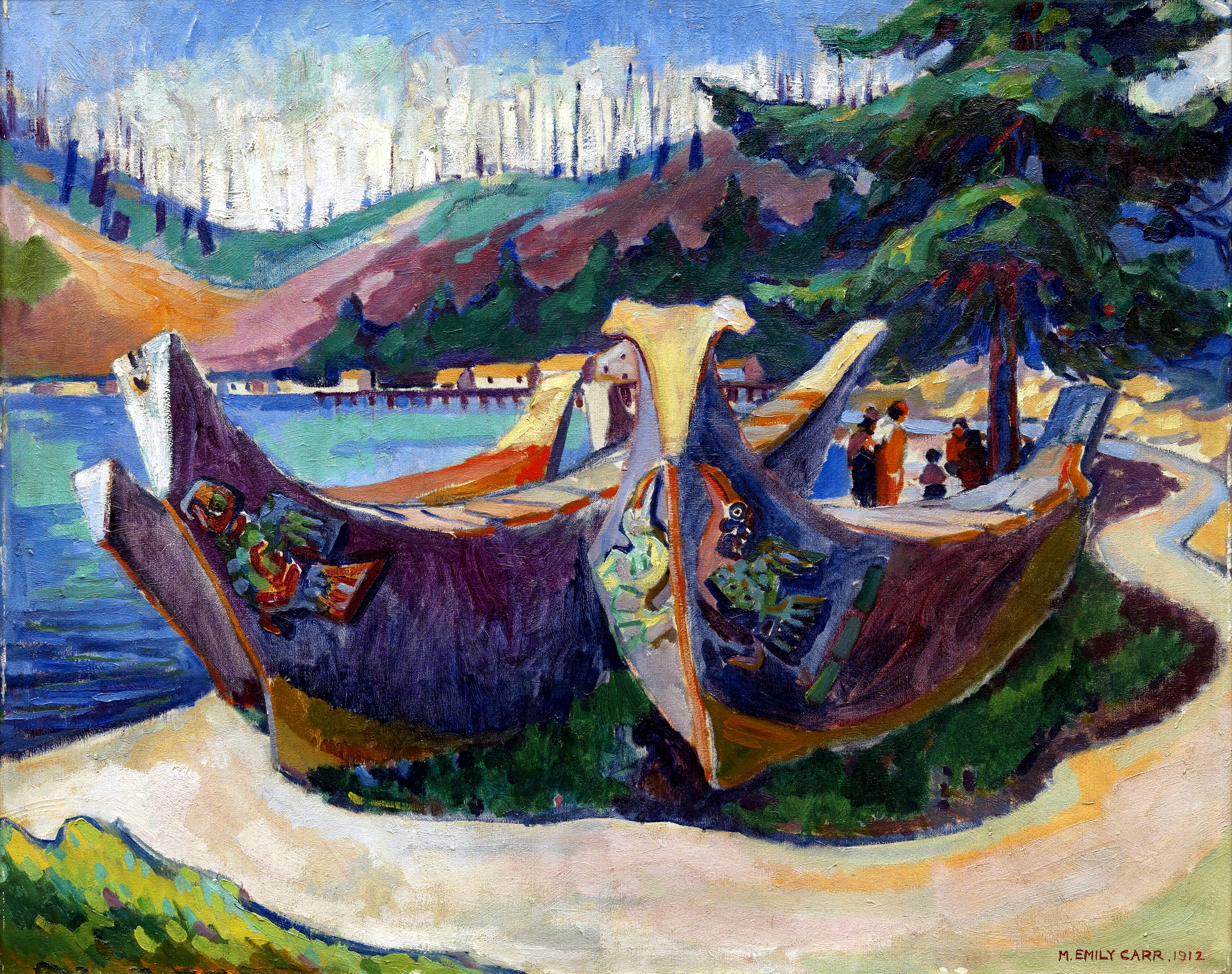
First Nations War Canoes in Alert Bay by Emily Carr (1871–1945), in the museum collection

The Audain Art Museum displays a permanent collection of over 300 works of art from coastal British Columbia. The works span from the 18th century to the modern era and present day, containing a collection of Northwest Coast First Nations masks, a collection of works encompassing all periods of Emily Carr's artistic career as well as art by important post-war modernists such as E.J. Hughes, Gordon Smith and Jack Shadbolt. The collection also showcases art by internationally renowned contemporary British Columbia artists including Jeff Wall, Dana Claxton, Marianne Nicolson, Rodney Graham and Stan Douglas, among others.

=== Accessibility ===
All public areas of the museum are wheelchair-accessible.

== Past exhibitions ==
Since its inception, the Audain Art Museum has hosted numerous temporary exhibitions, displaying a variety of artworks.

- January 21 – May 22, 2017 Fred Herzog: Shadowlands.
- June 10 – October 16, 2017 Edward Burtynsky: The Scarred Earth.
- March 9 – April 9, 2018 Shawn Hunt: Transformation.
- March 30 – June 11, 2018 Beau Dick: Revolutionary Spirit.
- June 30 – September 17, 2018 POP.
- October 6 – January 28, 2019 Ancestral Modern: Australian Aboriginal Art from the Kaplan & Levi Collection.
- February 16 – May 6, 2019 Tales of an Empty Cabin: Somebody Nobody Was…
- May 18 – August 26, 2019 Artistry Revealed: Peter Whyte, Catharine Robb Whyte and Their Contemporaries.
- September 21 – January 20, 2020 Emily Carr: Fresh Seeing – French Modernism and the West Coast.
- February 8 – October 18, 2020 The Extended Moment: Fifty Years of Collecting Photographs.
- June 10 – September 6, 2021 Itee Pootoogook: Hymns to the Silence.
- October 23, 2021 – February 21, 2022 Riopelle: The Call of Northern Landscapes and Indigenous Cultures.
- April 2 – August 14, 2022 Wolves: The Art of Dempsey Bob.
- September 17, 2022 - January 8, 2023 Out of Control: The Concrete Art of Skateboarding
- January 28 - May 15, 2023 The Collectors' Cosmos: The Meakins-McClaran Print Collection
- April 1 - June 11, 2023 Svava Tegesen: Ornamental Cookery
- June 24 - October 9, 2023 Manabu Ikeda: Flowers from the Wreckage
- September 23, 2023 - January 29, 2024 Karin Bubaš: Garden of Shadows
- November 25, 2023 - May 6, 2024 Gathie Falk: Revelations
- April 21 - September 9, 2024 Otherwise Disregard - Capture Photography Festival
- June 29 - October 14, 2024 Tom Thomson: North Star
- October 4, 2024 - January 27, 2025 Russna Kaur: Pierced into the air, the temper and secrets crept in with a cry!
- November 23, 2024 - May 5, 2025 Curve! Women Carvers on the Northwest Coast
- April 27 - September 15, 2025 The Coast Mountains: Recent Works by Edward Burtynsky

== Governance ==
The Audain Art Museum is incorporated under the Canada Not-for-profit Corporations Act, effective October 4, 2012, and is a Registered Charity. The Museum's Board of Trustees serves as its governing body.
