= Doris Shadbolt =

Canadian art historian (1918–2003)

Doris Shadbolt, née Meisel OC LL. D. D.F.A. (November 28, 1918 – December 22, 2003) was an art historian, author, curator, cultural bureaucrat, educator and philanthropist who had an important impact on the development of Canadian art and culture.

== Early life and education ==
Doris (née Meisel) Shadbolt was born to parents Rufus Meisel and Ann Hamacher Meisel on November 28, 1918, in Preston, Ontario, Canada. Doris grew up and was educated with her two sisters, Grace and Ruth, in Ontario. She later attended the University of Toronto where she received an Honours Bachelor of Arts, Magna Cum Laude, specializing in Fine Arts under the direction of both Charles Comfort and John Alford.

== Career within Canadian art institutions ==
Graduating with an Honours BA from the University of Toronto in 1941, her first position was research assistant from 1942 to 1943 at the Art Gallery of Ontario, then known as the Art Gallery of Toronto. From 1943 to 1945, she worked at the National Gallery of Canada in Ottawa as an assistant to Director Charles Comfort and worked with colleague Walter Abel, founder of the magazine, Canadian Art. It was during this time she met her future husband, Jack Shadbolt. Although offered a Fellowship at Columbia University in New York, she chose to marry Jack Shadbolt in 1945. From 1948 to 1949, Doris lived with her husband in New York, where she worked at the Metropolitan Museum of Art. While in New York, she studied under art historian Meyer Shapiro, a Columbia professor who impressed upon her that "art is vitally connected to the social context of the time." This learning, as well as Doris and Jack's involvement in the New York art community, changed Doris's art philosophy and influenced her later work as a curator, educator and writer. In 1950, she moved with her husband, painter Jack Shadbolt, to Vancouver, British Columbia.

After moving to Vancouver, Shadbolt started her 25-year career with the Vancouver Art Gallery as a volunteer, then director of education. In 1963, she was moved into the role of Curator. From 1967 to 1975, Shadbolt served as the senior curator, then associate director, and was responsible for the Vancouver Art Gallery's collections and exhibition program. Under her direction as curator, the Vancouver Art Gallery became known on both the national and international art scenes for experimental and leading-edge exhibitions.

During her term at the Vancouver Art Gallery, Doris Shadbolt curated several groundbreaking exhibitions, beginning with "The Nude in Art" in 1965. This was followed by "Images for a Canadian Heritage" in 1966. The following year in 1967, a pivotal exhibition called "Arts of the Raven" opened with the intention to "nourish, sustain a regional culture." For the first time, this exhibition showcased First Nations works as art within a gallery setting, a divergence from the historical inclusion of these objects as artifacts in an anthropological setting. This show was so successful that, for the first time, a full-page review of a Vancouver Art Gallery exhibition was included in the New York Times.

In 1969, out of her work at the Canadian Eskimo Art Council, "Masterworks for the Canadian North, Sculpture of the Inuit" exhibition opened. This was a particularly difficult exhibition to curate as it was designed for international travel, subsequently opening in Copenhagen, London, Paris, Moscow, Leningrad, Philadelphia and Montreal.

In 1970, Shadbolt opened "New York 13" at the Vancouver Art Gallery, the idea borne from Doris's desire for Vancouver to be exposed to the "expanding edge of artistic sensibilities at the time." This exhibition introduced Vancouver to contemporary artists, including Robert Morris, Jasper Johns, Claes Oldenburg and Andy Warhol. This international exposure for the Vancouver art community was furthered with the 1971 exhibition of the "Los Angeles Six.".

In 1971, the "Centennial Exhibition of Emily Carr" opened. In 1973, "Sound Sculpture" was exhibited, followed by "The Art of Bill Reid" in 1974.

== Writing career ==
In 1975, Shadbolt left the Vancouver Art Gallery to pursue art research and writing. In 1980, her first book called The Art of Emily Carr was published as a biography of Emily Carr which is still "one of the most important scholarly works on the artist". This book was followed in 1986 by her biography Bill Reid which won the 1987 Hubert Evans Non-Fiction Prize. In 1990, an additional book was published by Shadbolt called Emily Carr. At 84 years of age, Doris Shadboldt published her final book on Emily Carr, called Seven Journeys: the sketchbooks of Emily Carr (2002). Shadbolt's books are considered important reference material for these British Columbian artists.

== Awards ==
Doris Shadbolt won several awards for her non-fiction as well as honorary doctorate degrees from Simon Fraser University, the University of British Columbia, and Emily Carr University of Art and Design. In addition to becoming an Officer of the Order of Canada in 1976, she received the Governor General's Award in Visual and Media Arts in 1990. Doris Shadbolt received numerous additional awards for her contributions to literature and the arts:

- Officer of the Order of Canada, 1973
- Award of Merit, Canadian Museums Association, 1980
- Medal of the Royal Canadian Academy, 1986
- BC Annual Book Award (2), 1987, for Bill Reid
- Distinguished leadership Award, Simon Fraser University President's Club, 1988
- Governor General's Awards in Visual and Media Arts, 2000

== Other interests ==
Longtime residents on Capitol Hill in Burnaby, the Shadbolts also maintained a summer home on Hornby Island where they were active in the artists colony there. A passionate collector of B.C. ceramics, she bequeathed her 170-piece collection of pottery by Wayne Ngan, Glenn Lewis, Tam Irving, and others to the Morris and Helen Belkin Art Gallery. Beginning in the 1950s, Shadbolt designed silver jewelry, exhibiting at the New Design Gallery in 1961. Her sculptural abstract forms were inspired by natural forms and African art.

== Community contributions ==
In 1988, Doris and Jack Shadbolt established the Vancouver Institute for the Visual Arts (VIVA). This organization, renamed the Jack and Doris Shadbolt Foundation in 1998, recognizes two local Vancouver artists each year with an award of $10,000, and awards an outstanding contributor to British Columbia culture with $50,000 every five years.

The Shadbolt Centre for the Arts, located in Burnaby, British Columbia, is named after Jack and Doris Shadbolt.

== Selected works ==
- The Art of Emily Carr . Published by Douglas & McIntyre & Clarke Irwin, 1979 (book); reprinted as paper-back 1988
- Bill Reid. Published by Douglas & McIntyre, 1986 (book); re-printed in soft cover 1988
- Emily Carr. Douglas & McIntyre, 1990
- Seven Journeys: The Sketchbooks of Emily Carr. Douglas & McIntyre, 2002
- Shadbolt, Doris and Boulet, Roger. Watercolours and Drawings of Emily Carr. Victoria: Art Gallery of Greater Victoria, 1977.
- Nancy Riley and Doris Shadbolt, Wayne Ngan: Island Potter, DVD, Directed by Nancy Riley. CBC, 1980, DVD.

== Board member and committee representations ==
- First Canadian Film Development Corporation, Board Member
- Canadian Craft Museum, Board Member
- Canada Council, Board Member
- Canadian Cultural Property Export Review Board, Member
- São Paulo Biennale International Jury, 1968
- Canadian Massey Awards Jury, 1970
- Canada Council Periodicals Committee, 1971-1973
- First Canadian Postage Stamp Design Committee, 1969-1972
- Canadian Eskimo Art Council, Affiliate, 1967-1973
- Canadian Film Development Corporation, board member, 197-1975
- National Museums of Canada, Museums Assistance Program, Grants Committee, 1980-84
- Society for Critical Art Publications, board member, 1985-1988 Canada Council Arts Advisory Committee, 1985-1988
- Vancouver Art Gallery Acquisitions Committee
- Art for Public Places Sub-Committee (City of Vancouver)

== Honorary degrees ==
- Simon Fraser University, 1994
- Emily Carr University of Art and Design, 1995
- University of British Columbia
