= E. J. Hughes =

Canadian painter (1913–2007)

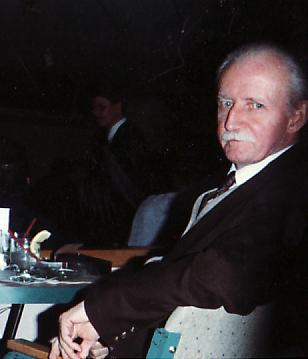
- Born: Edward John Hughes; February 17, 1913; North Vancouver, British Columbia, Canada
- Died: January 5, 2007 (aged 93); Duncan, British Columbia
- Education: Vancouver School of Applied Art and Design, graduated 1933
- Known for: Painter
- Spouse: Rosabel Fern Irvin Smith (m. 1940) (d. 1974)

Edward John Hughes CM OBC RCA (February 17, 1913 – January 5, 2007) was a Canadian painter, known for his images of the land and sea in British Columbia.

== Early career ==
Hughes was born in North Vancouver, British Columbia, Canada, and spent a significant part of his childhood in Nanaimo, British Columbia. Raised during the Depression, he studied at the Vancouver School of Decorative and Applied Arts where he graduated in 1933. His talent was recognized early. One of his teachers was Frederick Varley of the Group of Seven, and another member, Lawren Harris, recommended him for the inaugural Emily Carr Scholarship in 1947.

In 1934, he formed a partnership with the muralist Paul Goranson and Orville Fisher in a commercial art firm.

== World War II ==
When World War II began in 1939, he enlisted with the Royal Canadian Artillery as a gunner and was posted to England. From 1943 to 1946, he served as one of Canada's Official Second World War artists. Hughes traveled to England, Wales, Alaska and Kiska Island where he depicted ordinary men caught up in this worldwide event. He produced well over a thousand drawings, many watercolours, oil sketches and almost 30 paintings. One curator calls his work between 1940 and 1946 for the Canadian war records perhaps the "most significant body of work by a Canadian artist in the Canadian War Museum".

== Post-War period ==
After being discharged from the military in 1946, he returned to Victoria, on the west coast of Canada, with his wife Fern and settled initially in Victoria. In 1951, they moved to Shawnigan Lake on Vancouver Island, where he enjoyed the quiet rural community. At first, he concentrated on waterfront subjects near his home. Hughes spent much of the remainder of his life living on Vancouver Island where he pursued a lifelong study of the island, the province and its landscape as a professional artist.

In the 1950s, Hughes' reputation grew, especially after he signed an exclusive contract to sell all his work to Dr. Max Stern, the owner of the Dominion Gallery in Montreal in 1951. Stern encouraged him to expand his range of subject matter. In 1954, he was one of eighteen Canadian artists commissioned by the Canadian Pacific Railway to paint a mural for the interior of one of the new Park cars entering service on the new Canadian transcontinental train. Each of the murals depicted a different national or provincial park; Hughes' was Tweedsmuir Provincial Park. In 1992, Canada Post used one of his images ("Christie Pass, Hurst Island, B.C.") on a stamp commemorating 125 years of Confederation.

Hughes died of cardiac arrest in Duncan, BC at the age of 93.

== Legacy ==
Hughes' paintings are best known for their strong and appealing images of the landscape and seascape of British Columbia. Jack Shadbolt described Hughes as "the most engaging intuitive painter of the BC landscape since Emily Carr." His distinctive style of painting is marked by the use of flattened space, skewed perspective, and simplified shapes. The paintings combine compelling clarity with a sense of the unknown and an appreciation for his natural surroundings. His sources are many, among them Jan Vermeer, his favorite artist, and the Mexican muralists, such as Diego Rivera.

Hughes was elected to the Royal Canadian Academy of Arts in 1969. Hughes was awarded with Honorary Doctorates from the University of Victoria in 1994 and the Emily Carr Institute of Art and Design in 1997. In 2001, he received the Order of Canada and, in 2005, he was awarded the Order of British Columbia. Both of these awards cited his dedication to representing Canada with passion and originality.

The Vancouver Art Gallery has the most extensive holding of Hughes' work in public hands and mounted a major retrospective exhibition in 2003, curated by Ian M. Thom.

== Record sale prices ==
His painting Lake Okanagan was purchased at a rural Ontario yard sale for C$200. Six years later, in 2007, the purchaser sold it at auction for $402,500. In November 2018, his painting Fishboats, River Inlet sold for $2,041,250 CAD (premium included) at the Heffel Auction. On November 19, 2025, the Hughes painting Entrance to Howe Sound sold at auction for $4.8 million CAD, breaking the record for the highest price ever paid for an artwork by a B.C. artist, and becoming the fourth most expensive Canadian artwork sold at auction. In spring 2026, E.J. Hughes's Coastal Boats Near Sidney, BC (1948), consigned by the Emily Carr University of Art + Design to benefit student awards, soared to $5,701,250 and established a new auction record for the artist.

== Books ==
- E. J. Hughes, by Ian M. Thom (Senior curator, Vancouver Art Gallery). A 226-page hardcover book published by Douglas & McIntyre and the Vancouver Art Gallery in 2002. ISBN 1-55054-899-9. This book was the catalogue for the E. J. Hughes exhibition which was seen at the Vancouver Art Gallery and later at the McMichael Canadian Art Collection in Kleinburg, Ontario, and the Art Gallery of Greater Victoria.
- A Journey with E.J. Hughes, By Jacques Barbeau, 2005 180-page hardcover, Douglas & McIntyre. ISBN 1-55365-153-7
- E.J. Hughes: The Man and His Art, by Jane G. Cole (Art Professor, Vancouver Island University), 2009 Nanaimo Art Gallery. 32-page paperback. This biography was published to coincide with the release of a number of Giclée prints from the Estate of E.J. Hughes. ISBN 0-9812-6260-0, 978-0-9812-6260-4
- EJ Hughes Paints Vancouver Island, by Robert Amos (2018), 204-page hardcover book published by TouchWood Editions. ISBN 9781771512558 The book was a finalist for the 2019 BC and Yukon Book Prizes and the 2019 City of Victoria Butler Book Prize.
- E. J. Hughes Paints British Columbia, by Robert Amos (2019), 204-page hardcover book published by TouchWood Editions. ISBN 9781771513104
- The E.J. Hughes Book of Boats, by Robert Amos (2020), 88-page hardcover book publisher by TouchWood Editions. ISBN 9781771513364 This book was the winner of the 2021 BC and Yukon Book Prizes Bill Duthie Booksellers' Choice Award.
- E. J. Hughes: Canadian War Artist, by Robert Amos (2022), 216-page hardcover book publisher by TouchWood Editions. ISBN 9781771513852 The book was the winner of the 2023 Basil Stuart-Stubbs Prize for Outstanding Book on British Columbia, the 2022 PubWest Book Design Awards Gold Medal for Historical / Biographical Book, and was a finalist for the City of Victoria Butler Book Prize.
- E. J. Hughes: Life at the Lake, by Robert Amos (2023), 112-page hardcover book publisher by TouchWood Editions. ISBN 9781771514194

== Film ==
- E.J. Hughes Restoration: Triumph Over Hard Times, is a 2009 documentary on the life of E.J. Hughes and the restoration of his Malaspina mural, a large 9x12 foot work of art now worth over 4 million dollars. The documentary was nominated for a Leo Award, and won a Gold Remi from the Houston International Film Festival.
- The Painted Life of E.J. Hughes, is a 2025 Knowledge Network documentary directed by Jenn Strom and produced by Kevin Eastwood about Hughes's life that gives particular focus to his shyness and reclusiveness as an artist. The film premiered at the 2025 Vancouver International Film Festival and was released in theatres in February 2026.

== Bibliography ==
- MacDonald, Colin (1968). A Dictionary of Canadian Artists (First ed.). Ottawa: Canadian Paperbacks Publishing. ISBN 0919554113.
- Thom, Ian M. (2002). E. J. Hughes. Vancouver: Douglas & McIntyre, Vancouver Art Gallery.
