= Jack Shadbolt =

Canadian painter (1909–1998)

Jack Leonard Shadbolt
- Born: February 4, 1909; Shoeburyness, England
- Died: November 22, 1998 (aged 89); Burnaby, British Columbia
- Education: Frederick Varley at the Vancouver School of Art
- Known for: painter
- Spouse: Doris Meisel (m. 1945)

Jack Leonard Shadbolt, CM OBC (February 4, 1909 – November 22, 1998) was a Canadian painter.

== Early life ==
Born in Shoeburyness, England, Shadbolt came to Canada with his parents in April 1911. He was raised in Victoria, British Columbia. He studied at the Art Students' League in New York City (1948) and in London (1937) and Paris (1938). From 1928 to 1937, he taught in high schools in Duncan, British Columbia and Vancouver, British Columbia. Starting in 1938, he taught and studied with Frederick Varley at the Vancouver School of Art.

He married Doris Meisel in 1945 and the couple moved to Burnaby, a suburb of Vancouver, in 1950.

== War artist ==
In 1942, during World War II, Jack Shadbolt enlisted in the army. In 1944, he sketched and painted in the prisoner-of-war camp at Petawawa, Ontario. He was transferred in 1945 to London, where he served as an administrative officer for the official Canadian War Art Program.

== Later years ==
After the war, Shadbolt returned to his faculty position at the Vancouver School of Art (VSA). When he retired in 1966, he was the head of painting and drawing section. He devoted more time to painting as well as to writing poetry which was published with his drawings in 1973 in "Mind's I: Jack Shadbolt" (McClelland and Stewart Ltd.). In 1984, Scott Watson for the Vancouver Art Gallery organized the major exhibition titled Jack Shadbolt: Act of Painting.

In 1987, Shadbolt and his wife founded the Vancouver Institute for the Visual Arts, a charitable foundation to provide grants to individuals in support of their artistic endeavours. The foundation was later renamed The Jack and Doris Shadbolt Foundation for the Visual Arts.

== Recognition ==
In 1956, works by Shadbolt along with those of Louis Archambault and Harold Town represented Canada at the Venice Biennale. In 1972, he was made an Officer of the Order of Canada. In 1990, he was awarded the Order of British Columbia. Throughout his life, Shadbolt continued to advance the boundaries of his art.

On 24 August 2001, Canada Post issued 'The Space Between Columns #21 (Italian), 1965, Jack Shadbolt' in the Masterpieces of Canadian art series. The stamp was designed by Pierre-Yves Pelletier based on an oil painting "'The Space Between Columns #21 (1965) by Jack Shadbolt. The $1.05 stamps are perforated 13 X 13.5 mm and were printed by Ashton-Potter Limited.

The Shadbolt Centre for the Arts located at Deer Lake Park was named after Jack Shadbolt and offers performing and visual arts programs for people of all ages as well as facilitates Royal Conservatory of Music examinations.

== Selected works ==
- 1961 — Dark Gardens
- 1961 — Villa in the Countryside
- 1963 — Bush Pilot in Northern Sky, mural at Edmonton International Airport
- 1968 — In Search of Form
- 1970 — Miracle Of Birds
- 1970 — Man Of Symbol
- 1970 — Night Fears
- 1971 — Adjustable Venus
- 1971-1972 — To Old Gardens
- 1972 — Guardian
- 1972 — Little Wolf
- 1972 — Little Bride
- 1972 — Daughter Of Chiefs
- 1972 — Ritual Of The Arrow
- 1972 — World Behind
- 1972 — Place
- 1973 — Mind's I
- 1973 — The Way In
- 1973 — Lost World
- 1974 — Mystery Of Flower
- 1974 — Bride
- 1974 — Galaxy
- 1974 — Sinbad's Voyages
- 1974 — Transformations No. 3
- 1976 — Variation On A Kwakiutl Ghost Mask
- 1976 — India Suite
- 1976 — Transformations No. 5
- 1976-1977 — Lodi Gardens
- 1976-1977 — Morning East
- 1977 — Trees And Rock
- 1977 — Erotic Landscape
- 1977 — Dark Landscape
- 1977 — Classic Landscape
- 1977 — Mountain Summer (End Flight)
- 1977 — For Vladimir
- 1977 — Sea Edge Nocturne
- 1977 — High Country Event
- 1977 — High Range Country
- 1977 — Event On The Rocks
- 1981 — Act of Art

== See also ==
- Canadian official war artists
- War artist
- War art
