= Emelina Soares =

Qatari-born Indian artist, art historian and educator

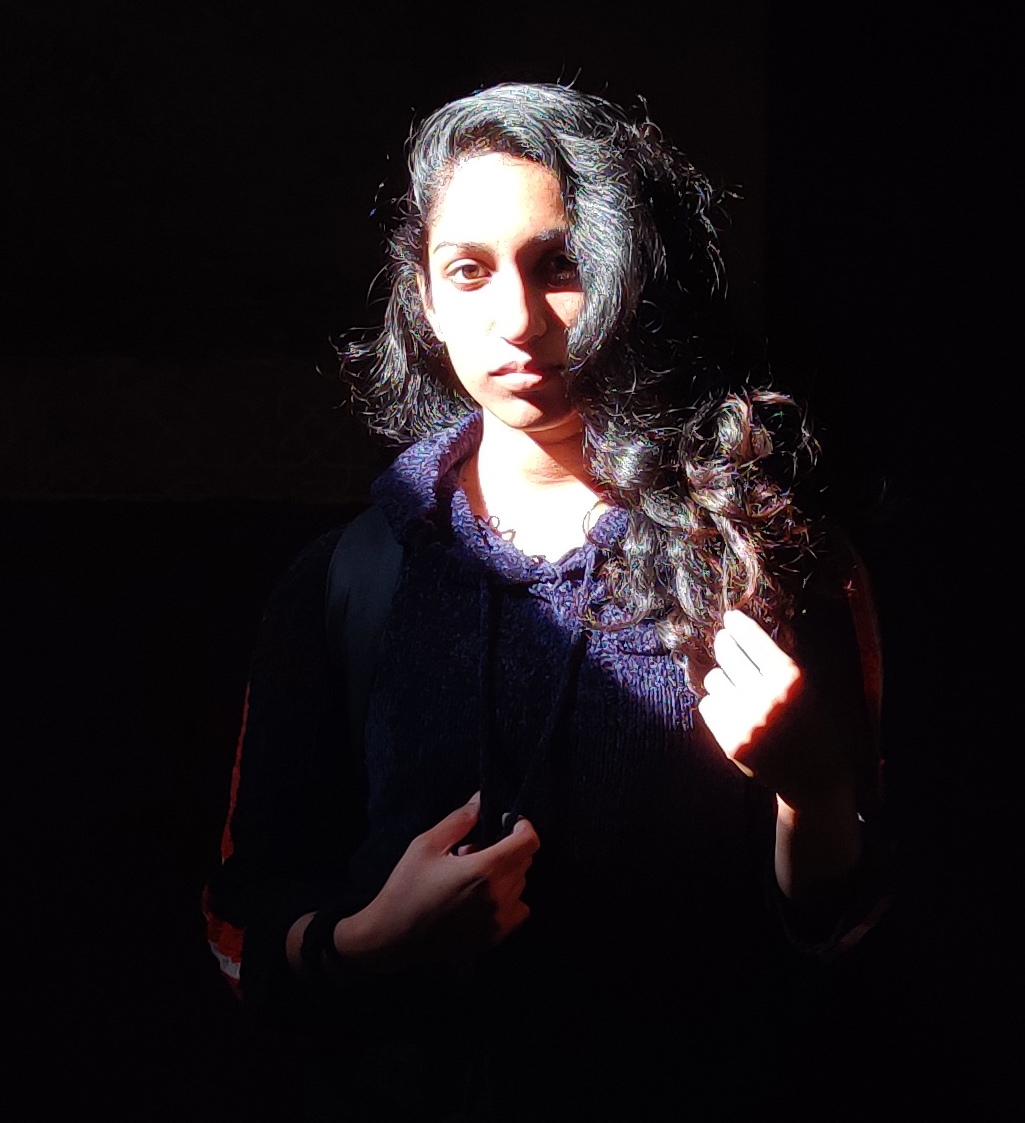
- Born: 1993 (age 32–33); Doha, Qatar
- Education: Emily Carr University of Art and Design, MFA University College of London, MA Virginia Commonwealth University, BFA

Emelina Soares (born 1993) is an Indian artist, art historian, and educator who uses site-specific installation, animation, projection, drawing, printmaking, and sculpture. Common themes of her works include ecology, ethology, migration, and cultural exchanges.

== Early life and education ==
She completed her BFA from Virginia Commonwealth University Qatar, in addition with an MA from the University College of London Qatar under Hamad Bin Khalifa University and an MFA from Emily Carr University of Art and Design.

== Art practice ==
=== Research ===
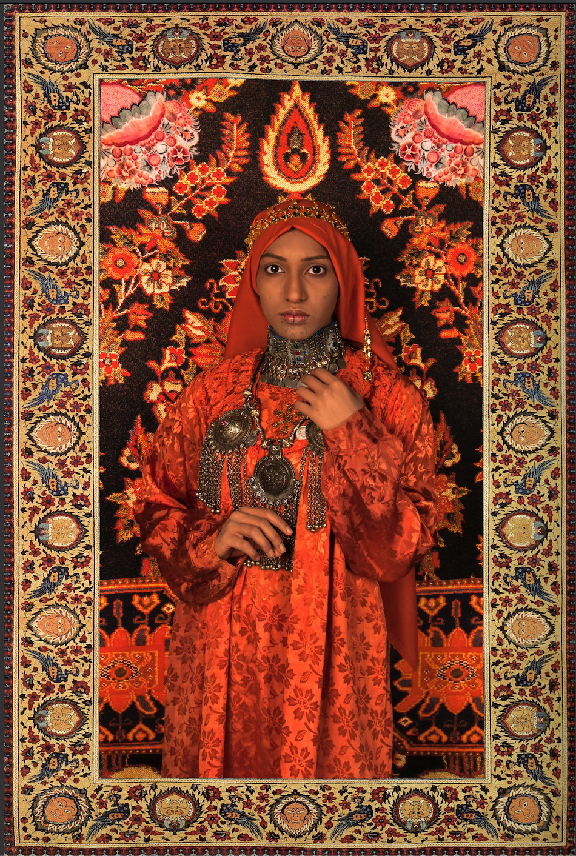
Recontextualizing Saint Thomas created by Soares

Soares used oriental references as inspiration, combined with prominent saints from India, the Middle East and Portugal to create contemporary appropriations in the series of recontextualizing saints. Her practice explored patterns of carpets in combination with sand from the dunes of Qatar, and natural dyes from India, to create ephemeral Sand Carpets. The changing patterns of the carpets due to guests walking on the piece reflects her multinational identity.

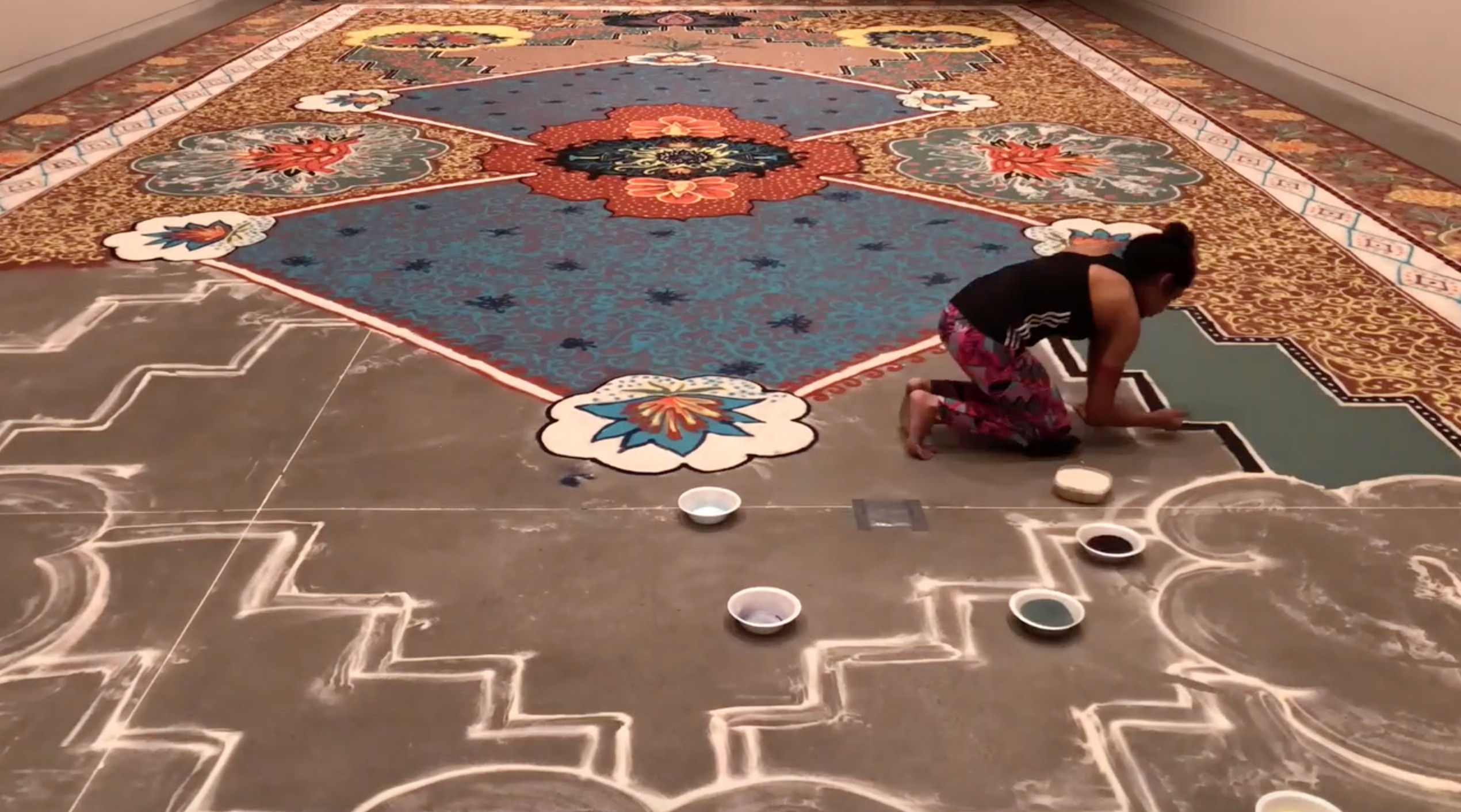
Sand Carpet by Soares.

Her practice consists of site-specific installations such as Hidden in Plain Site, that discuss the adaptive attitude of migrating and invasive bodies within changing perspectives of space and place.

Soares participated as an artist and facilitator for the Leaning Out of Windows project led by Randy Lee Cutler and Ingrid Koenig, where she collaborated with a physicist from TRIUMF, Canada's national particle accelerator centre, and faculty from Emily Carr University, to create an interdisciplinary project on the study of dark matter.

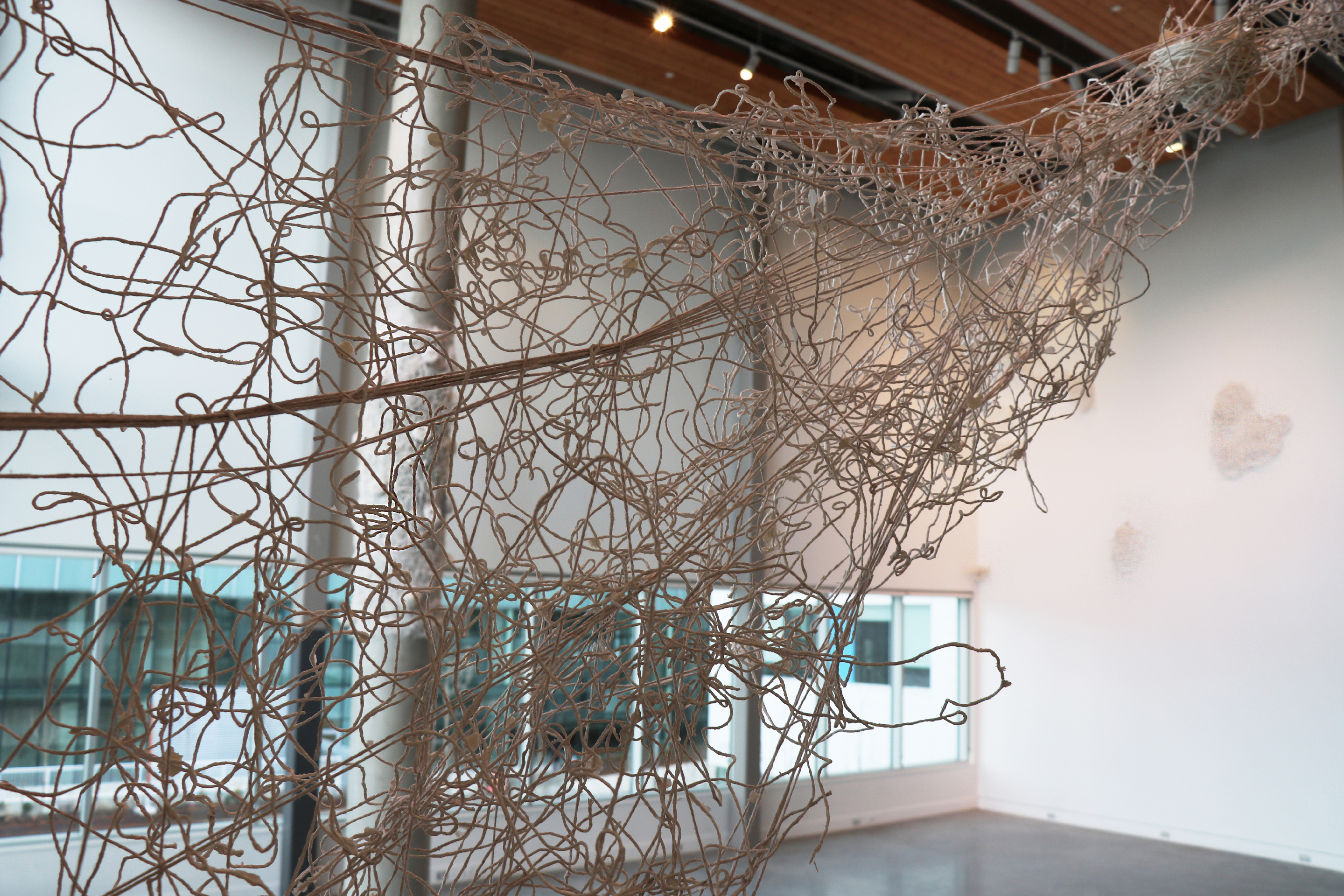
Hidden in Plain Site is a site-specific installation created by Soares.

=== Exhibitions ===
Soares was part of several group exhibition such as Shifting Identities, Introspection / Extrospection, Tracing Erasure in Vancouver, Canada. Qatar Contemporary Art and Photography in Russia, Ruwad: Pioneering artists of Qatar in Washington DC. Art Leaders Network and Contemporary Art Qatar in Germany. Built/ Unbuilt Home/ City at the Kathmandu Triennale 2017. AlBahie Auction House, Qatar Foundation: Emerging Artists, Art and Medicine VCU Qatar, Fire Station Artists-in-residence show, Virginia Commonwealth University Qatar, Katara Art Centre, and Qatar Museums: Create and Inspire (Qatar Brazil).
