= Evann =

Evann is a given name. Notable people with the name include:

- Evann Girault (born 2004), French-Nigerien sabre fencer
- Evann Guessand (born 2001), French footballer
- Evann Siebens (fl. 1996), Canadian multi-disciplinary artist
