= Margaret Dragu =

Canadian artist (born 1953)

Margaret Dragu (born 1953) is a celebrated Canadian artist recognized for innovation in many disciplines including performance art, contemporary dance, social practice art, video art, installation art, independent publishing, radio, and interactive platforms like social media. Her work has been performed, screened, exhibited, and published in many countries. In 1998 her European tour was supported by the Department of Foreign Affairs, Trade and Development (now Global Affairs Canada) with the German Hessiche Ministerium für Wissenschaft und Kunst and the Cultural Department of the Netherlands. She has been awarded numerous funding awards from the Canada Council for the Arts as well as other arts funding agencies in Canada and Europe. In 2002 she was the first artist to be honoured in the Canadian Performance Art Legends book series with La Dragu: The Living Art of Margaret Dragu (Paul Couillard, editor), by Fado Performance Inc. In 2012 Margaret Dragu was the recipient of the Governor General's Award for Visual and Media Arts. In the same year Dragu was designated Éminence Grise by 7A*11D International Festival of Performance Art. In 2024 she delivered the International Women’s Day Address at Contemporary Art Conversations, Simone de Beauvoir Institute, Concordia University.

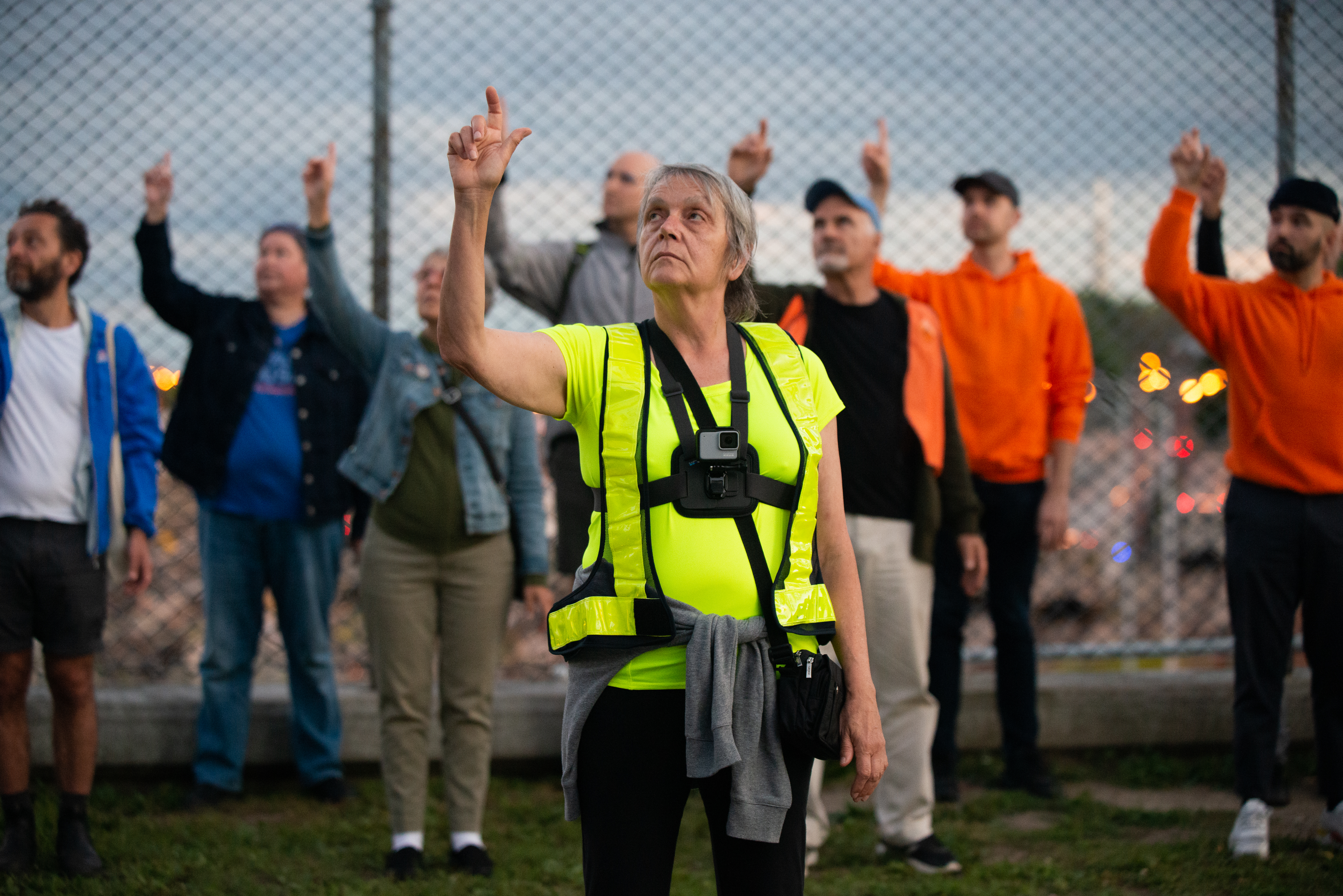
Margaret Dragu performing NEW NORMAL an embodied novel: dusk 2 dark. Photograph by Henry Chan.

== Early life and career ==
Margaret Dragu was born in Regina, SK in 1953. Her family moved to Calgary in 1963 where from 1969 to 1971 she studied dance under Yone Kvietys Young, a Calgary-based instructor of contemporary dance. Kvietys Young ran two dance companies that Dragu was part of, Calgary Creative Dancers (for children) and Contemporary Dance Calgary (for adults). Under Kvietys Young, Dragu was introduced to German Expressionism, Dada influences, choreography by chance, and card play from John Cage and Merce Cunningham. From Calgary, Dragu moved to New York in 1971, where she trained at the Alwin Nikolais -Murray Louis Dance School. She also studied choreography and musical composition with Laura Foreman and John Watts at the New School for Social Research. Dance studies at Louis-Nikolas Dance School were influenced by German-based modern dance including the pioneer dance artist Hanya Holm. In New York she became acquainted with the Judson Church, and participated in “happenings” The use of everyday and ordinary movement as a score for artistic work, which was prevalent in the New York scene at that time, had a formative and lasting impact on her approach to performance and art. Both dance mentors Yone Kvetys-Young and Laura Foreman demonstrated for Dragu an ease in working with visual artists and with situating their work in art galleries, and this affinity to art stayed with her throughout her practice.

In 1973 with a bursary from the Alberta government Dragu moved to Montreal to continue to study dance with Eva von Genscy and Eddy Toussaint at Les Ballets Jazz de Montréa l. During that time she met Tom Dean and performed with him in Un Petit Spectacle at Véhicule Art. At Véhicule Art, she also worked with experimental filmmakers including Bozo Moyle from the National Film Board of Canada (NFB) who introduced her to the videotape Portapak, which was popular with contemporary artists in the 1970s. In 1974 Dragu contributed choreography in an art event created by Tom Dean for the exhibition Périphéries at Musée d'art contemporain de Montréal (MAC). Périphéries was produced in part with Véhicule Art and marked MAC's first collaboration with an artist-run centre.

In addition to teaching dance classes in a community art school called Art Dump Workshop and developing her contemporary art and dance practice during her time in Montreal she also began a career as a burlesque performer (striptease) artist. As a sought-after stripper Dragu performed in numerous venues (“strip clubs” and bars) in Montreal, Quebec City, Chicoutimi, Trois Rivieres and Chibougamau. As an artist and burlesque performer, she honed skills in vaudeville and theatre, and developed cross-overs between art and burlesque. In her words, “I wanted to cross-pollinate popular culture and fine art by inverting the sacred art gallery and the profane striptease club.” She also developed feminist perspectives on burlesque and sex work which she later researched and documented with co-author A. S. A. Harrison for the book Revelations: Essays on Striptease and Sexuality. With Heather Wells and Janet Walczeweski (director) she created an NFB-supported film on the subject, Theatre for Strangers (1978). Dragu was an organizer for strippers' rights with the help of the Canadian Labour Congress and the Association of Canadian Radio and Television Artists. The short-lived strippers’ union was called the Canadian Association for Burlesque Entertainers.

An insurance fraud-related fire that destroyed her residence in Montreal precipitated Dragu's move to Toronto in 1974. There she became affiliated with artist-run centres including A Space gallery and 15 Dance Lab. She taught dance and movement at Ontario College of Art and classes in contemporary dance, tap dance,and burlesque at A Space. In Toronto Dragu met Granada Gazelle, members of General Idea, A. S. A. Harrison, Elke Town, Rodney Werden, Judy Holm, and the artists at Coach House Press. She met Kate Craig, Eric Metcalfe, and Hank Bull from the Western Front in Vancouver when they visited A Space. When describing her time in Toronto, Dragu declared, “I was a passionate collaborator, pair-ing and trio-ing with painters, sculptors, photographers, theatre artists, writers, sound designers, scenographers, fashion designers, film makers, video artists, and activists.” She made the video Back Up in collaboration with Kate Craig at the Western Front in Vancouver on 1978. While performing in Toronto Dragu was sexually assaulted by an audience member during a performance. The incident caused Dragu to retreat from performances in Toronto for a while, and then only resume in solo works, with police or paid security officers available.

A move to the Vancouver region in 1986 took place after Margaret Dragu performed X’s and O’s for the Canada Pavillion at Expo 86. During the Expo 86 commission she met Jim Stewart Munro. They lived together at Finn Slough, an historic fishing village at the mouth of the Fraser River in the southern reaches of Richmond, BC from 1987 to 2011. Their daughter Aretha Dragu Munro was born in 1988. Margaret Dragu was an active community member during her time in Richmond, BC. In addition to community-engaged creative projects she worked as a fitness instructor and personal trainer for the South Arm Community Centre.

=== Early Performance Art and Theater Productions (Toronto) ===
While living in Toronto (1975 to 1986), Margaret Dragu produced and performed in numerous theatrical and experimental dance and art performances that took place in theatre venues, artist-run organizations, national galleries, university theatres, and site-specific venues like botanical gardens, back alleys, and car parkades. Her works garnered critical attention and were recognized for their energy and intensity (Stephen Godfrey, The Globe and Mail, March 1979). One reviewer noted her as a “choreographer-actress” of cult status (Selma Landen Odom, Dancemagazine, January 1982). Her performance in Angel City (Sam Shepard) was recognized for displaying her versatility as a theatre performer, while recognizing her notoriety for erotic dance choreography and performance (McKenzie Porter, The Toronto Sun, May 25, 1979). Her work in Toronto took on audience participation, reflecting the performativity of parades, movement classes, and erotic dancing. Dragu's first international production, Her Majesty/sa majesté (with Tom Dean) was performed at Le Palais des Beaux-Arts (Brussels, Belgium) in 1981. She was featured on the covers of Toronto weekly's Now in 1982 and Broadcast Week Magazine in 1985.

1972

- Un petit spectacle (choreography and dance), at Véhicule Art (Montreal).
- (Performance) in the 1st World Festival of W.O.R.K.S. (Clive Robertson and Paul Woodrow), Year of the Rat 4670 in Calgary.

1974

- (Choreography) for Tom Dean, Musée d’Art contemporarian

1975

- Queen of the Silver Blades, in collaboration with Susan Swan, Gretchen Haywire, and Mary Canary at St. Paul's Theatre (Toronto), and with Marcella Lustig at Cinema Lumiere (Toronto).
- Try Leather, with Michael Hayden, Marcella Lustig, artists from Toronto Arts Community, at Fifteen Dance Lab (Toronto).
- Kresges & Woolyworths, at Fifteen Dance Lab.
- Canadian Folk Dance, at A Space.
- Choreography for General Idea’s Going Through the Motions, at the Art Gallery of Ontario.

1976

- Pick Up, at TWP Theatre (Toronto).
- Oh True Oh Real Oh Helpless Love, in collaboration with Redlight Theater at Bathurst Theatre (Toronto).
- Si Vite Si Vite Fondues Les Nieges D’Antan / So Fast So Fast Melt the Snows of Yesterday, at Cinema Lumiere (Toronto).

1977

- Canajan Burgers, in collaboration with Enrico Campana at Centre for Experimental Art and Communication (CEAC). This production traveled to Eye Level Gallery (Halifax), Arton's (Calgary), Manitoba Theatre Centre (Winnipeg), Regina Modern Dance Works (Regina), Paula Ross Studio (Vancouver), and Espace Tournesol (Edmonton).
- Performed the role of God in Charlie Leed's Tillie’s Punctured Romance, at Cafe SoHo (Toronto).

1978

- Sunset Strippers, with Marie-Hélène Fontaine, Kathy Marielle, Elizabeth Chitty, Arnie Achtman, and David Clement at The Funnel (Toronto).
- The Photographer's Ball, in collaboration with Susan Stewart at Arton's (Calgary).
- Performed in Michel Tremblay’s St. Carmen de la Main, at Tarragon Theatre (Toronto).

1979

- Beauty and the Beast Thing, with Enrico Campana and Terry Crack at the Factory Theatre Lab. This work was also produced again with Sunset Strippers as part of a Dragu production called 33 ⅓ Double Live. It later was produced at TWP Theatre and The Funnel (Toronto).
- TV Hertz 1, with Enrico Campana at the Art Gallery of Ontario and Musée des Beaux-Art in Montréal.
- Margaret Dragu acted in Angel City by Sam Shepard at the Toronto Free Theatre.

1980 and 1981

- The A.M. Show, with Guy Allen and Arnie Achtman at Artspace (Peterborough, ON), Véhicule Art (Montreal), University of Ottawa Theatre (Ottawa, ON) in 1980, and in 1981 at Simon Fraser University Theatre (Burnaby, BC), Erindale Theatre (University of Toronto), and again at Artspace.
- Canada Day Concert, with Ricardo Arbreut and Shelly Oliver in an alley near Peter Pan Restaurant and an artist's studio belonging to Rick Fischer in 1980.
- Her Majesty/sa majesté with Tom Dean at Art Gallery of Ontario and Le Palais des Beaux-Arts (Brussels, Belgium) in 1980.
- Unfit For Paradise with Elizabeth Chitty and Jane Ellison at Western Front (Vancouver) in 1981.
- Margaret Dragu performed the role of Spencer's Mom in Spencer’s Mom by Jim Garrard at the Salon Theatre (Toronto) in 1981.
- Margaret Dragu performed in Picnic in the Drift by Tanya Mass and Rina Fraticelli at the Ice House Theatre (Toronto) in 1981.
- Airport Dance (choreography) for Susan Macpherson, Jacki Burroughs, and Ricardo Arbreut at the YPT Theatre (Toronto) in 1981.

1982 and 1983

- (No Nonsense Black and White and Colour at Le Groupe de las Place Royale (Ottawa).
- I’m already Changing My Mind with Colin Campbell at Harbourfront Studio Theater (Toronto).
- Fear of Blue/angst vor blau with Tom Dean at London Art Gallery (London, ON) and Artspace in 1982, and in 1983 at Akademie der Kunst (Berlin, 1983).
- Unfit for Paradise was performed at The Rivoli (Toronto) in 1983.
- (In Burlington, ON) X’s and O’s on the Longest Day of the Year and X’s and O’s on the Shortest Day of the Year at the Burlington Botanical Gardens, Art Gallery of Hamilton (both in 1983).
- X’s and O’s, Off Centre (Calgary) in 1983.
- My Wireless is Running, with Colin Campbell, Toronto Dance Theatre in 1983.
- (In Montreal) Joy of Multidiscipline at Articule (Montreal) in 1983.
- Waiting (choreography with Elizabeth Chitty) by Elaine Carol in 1983.

1984 and 1985

- My Wireless is Running with Colin Campbell at the Toronto Dance Theatre in 1984.
- D.W.I. Strike and Public Parade Event on Queen's Park Parade Route (Toronto) in 1984.
- Joy of Multidiscipline at Artcite Gallery (Windsor, ON), Niagara Artists’ Centre/NAC (St. Catherines, ON), Banff School of Fine Arts (Banff, AB), Alberta College of Art (Calgary, AB) in 1984, and in 1985 at Emily Carr College of Art and Design (Vancouver).
- Margaret Dragu performed Peggy in Peggy’s Song by Jim Garrard at St. Paul's Theatre (Toronto) in 1984.
- Bad Apples (choreography) by Alan Booth and Simon Malbogat at the Mixed Theatre Co (Toronto) in 1984.
- Bass Saxophone (choreography) byJohn Roby and Kate Lushington at the Tarragon Back Theatre (Toronto) in 1984.
- Strip (choreography) by Theatre du P’tit Bonheur (T0oronto) in 1984.
- X’s and O’s in the Dead of Winter, at Off Centre (Calgary) in 1984.
- X’s and O’s for Friday the Thirteenth at Western Front (Vancovuer) in 1985.
- Moral/Passion with Elizabeth Chitty and Cultural Desire Project at the Music Gallery (Toronto) in 1985.
- Dancereading toured with Susan Swan, Shelagh Young, and was recorded for Artists’ TV Centre for National Book Festival in 1985.
- Joy of Multidiscipline at Véhicule (Montreal) in 1985.

1986

- Joy of Multidiscipline at Artspace.
- Joe Beef (choreography) by David Fenarrio with Mixed Theatre Company (Toronto).
- X’s and O’s for the Canada Pavillion at Expo 86 (Vancouver).

== Mid-Career Art and Performance Art ==
In 1986 Margaret Dragu relocated to the Vancouver region but lived away from the artistic centre in Finn Slough. With this relative isolation and the birth of her daughter, her work in the years 1987 to 1990 took up writing, independent publishing, visual art, and video productions. With limited access to Vancouver's art events and networks, she nurtured connections with people closer to home who she met in her work as a fitness instructor and personal trainer. From her relationships with other mothers, she worked to form the Momz Radio Collective which produced the Momz Radio programs on Vancouver Coop Radio and other independent University and community radio stations in Canada and the US, and teh book Mothers Talk Back, which she edited with Sarah Sheard and Susan Swan. She provided choreography for publicly engaged productions such as Luminaries Lantern Festival and Masque of Red Death by Public Dreams at Trout Lake (Vancouver) which she worked on from 1991 to 1993. While living at Finn Slough she focused on community-engaged and participatory art projects, including work for art galleries, as well as bringing participatory performances to local and international performance art festivals. It involved material practices including textiles, print publications, and mail art. From 2004 to 2008 Dragu corresponded through textile art with Pam Hall, who was residing on the opposite shore of the continent in St. John's, Newfoundland). The nearly 3000 stitched, printed, and painted textiles squares formed house structures in an exhibition Marginalia at the Richmond Art Gallery in 2008, and live performances in 2005, 2008, and 2010.

In 2006, Dragu first appeared as Lady Justice, a persona she would regularly present with an evolving group of participating artists. Lady Justice was a feminist intervention that took place in multiple locations in Canada and Europe. For instance, she appeared during commemoration events at the site of Marker of Change, the women's monument to those who died in the massacre at Montreal's École Polytechnique (Thornton Park, Vancouver). The first performance of Lady Justice was at Niagara Artists’ Centre/NAC (St. Catherines, ON) and SEXE!Action/VIVA!Art Action (Montréal). Another long-range persona was Verb Woman whose performance took many forms, often providing unexpected artist's services or what Dragu called “Art Aktions” such as mending, wrapping, and fitness. Verb Woman was first performed at Vancouver-based galleries and the LIVE! Biennale in 2009, the 2010 Cultural Olympiad (Vancouver), Vancouver Art Gallery (in 2018) and other Canadian and international sites (Berlin, Germany). Verb Woman was the major theme and title of Dragu's retrospective solo exhibition at Richmond Art Gallery in 2014.

1990

- Pheromones with Billy Little, Bill Smith, Jim S. Monro and Joey Meyer in Artropolis (Vancouver).
- Secret Kitchen at Artspace (Peterborough).

1991

- Secret Kitchen at grunt gallery (Vancouver).
- Masque of the Red Death (choreography) by Edgar Allen Poe, produced by Public Dreams Society and grunt gallery at Burrard Bridge Public Building (Vancouver).
- Performance at Vancouver Performance Poets, grunt gallery (Vancouver).

1992

- Secret Kitchen at New Performance Festival (Hornby Island, BC).
- Square Foot Real/réalité au mètre carré with Jim S. Munro at NAC (St. Catherines), Music Gallery (Toronto), Artspace (Peterborough) and Oboro (Montreal).
- Cabaret Vulgare with Jim S. Munro, Hank Bull, and Colin Griffiths at Western Front.
- Sliced Bread 1 with Jim S. Munro, Roy Kiyooka, Bill Smith, and Dana Inglis at Mayworks Arts Festival (Hornby Island).
- Sliced Bread 2 at EDAM Dance Studio (Vancouver).

1993

- Sliced Bread, at EDAM, LIVE International Performance Biennale (Vancouver).
- Performed in Ms. Frankenstein by Tanya Mars at Western Front (Vancouver).

1994

- The Bardo Gap at Western Front, at LIVE International Performance Biennale (Vancouver).
- Nine Suits with Jim S. Munro, Bill Smith, Dana Inglis, and David Lee at Mayworks Arts Festival.

1995

- Nine Suits with Paul Gibbons and Jim S. Munro at Silverton Art Gallery (Silverton, BC).
- Secret Kitchen at Silverton Art Gallery, and the Women in View Festival (Station Streets Arts Centre, Vancouver), at LIVE International Performance Biennale (Vancouver).

1997

- A Deconstructed Dollhouse/une maison de poupées en déconstruction at The @ Gallery (Vancouver).

1998

- Secret Kitchen, at Richmond Art Gallery (Richmond, BC).
- Eine Kleine Nacht Radio/a little night radio at Moltkerei Werkstadt (Köln), Dark.-Hallein (Mainz), c.u.b.a. (Münster), Carl Stipendiumin (Essen) and Artis (Hertogenbosch, Netherlands).
- Otzenrath Stipendium at Otzenrath Gallery of Culture and History (Bonn).

1999

- Eine Kleine Nacht Radio/a little night radio at NAC (St.Catherines), Artword Theatre (Toronto), and grunt gallery at LIVE International Performance Biennale (Vancouver).
- Improvisation for X’s and O’s with guitarist Brian Krocher at NAC (St.Catherines).
- Improvisation for X’s and O’s with violinist Jim S. Munro at grunt gallery (Vancouver).
- Improvisation for X’s and O’s with 25 Pounds of Potatoes, with Bobbie Kozinuk in Live at the End of the Century at Vogue Theatre (Vancouver).
- X’s and O’s for the Rites/Rights of May at Richmond Public Library and Cultural Centre (Richmond, BC).

2000

- Conscious Corpus: Corp Domestique and Corpus Delicious at Western Front (Vancouver).
- Cleaning and Loving (It) at Queen's Park (Toronto).
- Living Art at Cosmo Mall (Richmond).

2001

- Fairy Godmother of Stretch, at City of Richmond.
- The Wall is in My Head/Ich habe die Mauer in meinem Kopf/le mur est dans ma téte/lu muro e dentra mia testa with Tagny Duff for ReciproCity/RéciproCité et Elle Corazon an Studio 303 (Montreal).
- The Wall is in My Head/Ich habe die Mauer in meinem Kopf/le mur est dans ma téte/lu muro e dentra mia testa, for 7a*11d International Performance Art Festival (Gladstone Hotel, Toronto).
- Public/Private (conference presentation), for Changing Role of the Artist II, Richmond Art Gallery (Richmond).
- Pie Performance at Hamilton Art Gallery (Hamilton, ON).

2002

- Casting, 7a*11d International Performance Art Festival.

2003

- Walking Woman, at transit sites, Richmond Art Gallery, and Vancouver Art Gallery.
- SPLITZ at Western Front (Vancouver).
- Pie Performance at Richmond Art Gallery and grunt gallery (Vancouver).

2004

- Performology Remix - a gestural algorithm, with Tagny Duff at LIVE! Biennale, Western Front with video link to Studio XXX (Montreal).
- Rising (nuestra seora del pan) at Visualeyez Performance Festival, Latitude 53 (Edmonton), Powerhouse Galerie la Centrale (Montreal), and Western Front (Vancouver).

2005

- Marginalia (installation and performance), with Pam Hall at grunt gallery at LIVE International Performance Biennale (Vancouver).
- Biking Woman: (No) Refuge from Metaphor at Richmond Art Gallery (Richmond, BC) at LIVE International Performance Biennale (Vancouver).
- Rising (nuestra seora del pan) at Eastern Edge Gallery (St. John's, NL).

2006

- Lady Justice, at NAC (St. Catherine's, ON).
- Lady Justice: Pillowbook, at SEXE!Action/VIVA!Art Action (Montreal).
- Rising (nuestra seora del pan) at Douglas College (New Westminster, BC).

2007

- Performology Remix - a gestural algorithm, for LIVE! At Western Front (Vancouver).
- Lady Justice: Pillowbook, in Box Salon at The Rivoli (Toronto) and grunt gallery (Vancouver).

2008

- Marginalia: Getting out of the House (exhibition and catalogue), with Pam Hall, Richmond Art Gallery (Richmond, BC).
- Marginalia: Getting out of the House (performance), Richmond Art Gallery (Richmond, BC).
- Marginalia (installation and video), with Pam Hall at Faucet Studio Residency, Struts Gallery (Sackville, NB).
- Lady Justice Goes Buz Buz, in Hive 2 Festival at grunt gallery
- Lady Justice, at Magnetic North (Vancouver), Visualeyez Festival at Gallery Latitude 53 (Edmonton), and on-line at Revista Sin Texto: Dia Internacional del Reloj.

2009

- Lady Justice, in 2010 Peace Project, Richmond Women's Centre, and in Process of Performing Circles at the Cultural Olympiad (Vancouver).
- Verb Woman, at Western Front Dance Studio, Gallery Lambton (Sarnia, ON), CRAM Gallery (St. Catherines, ON), Hamilton Artist's Inc. (Hamilton, ON), Not Sent Letters Project (Spartacus Books, Vancouver).

2010

- Marginalia (installation), with Pam Hall at Studio XX Festival HTMlles 2010 (Montreal).

2011

- Verb Woman, at Stammtisch, Month of Performance (Berlin) and Institute for Modern and Contemporary Culture, University of Westminster (London).
- Verb Woman and the Adjectives, at Catalyst Art Gallery (Belfast, Ireland).

== Later Performance Art and Exhibitions ==
Margaret Dragu moved from Finn Slough to Vancouver in 2021. The Richmond Art Gallery produced a retrospective exhibition of her work in 2014. Dragu's later works further emphasized collaboration and participatory events, often including aspects of care and support in ways that blend her on-going work as a therapeutic personal trainer with reflections on aging and health. This is especially highlighted in the series of works called New Normal: an embodied novel which reflected Dragu's experience of recovery from joint replacement surgeries and the pandemic lock down. In 2023, Margaret Dragu along with an international team of artist-researchers Britta Wirthmüller (Universität der Künste Berlin), Justine A. Chambers (Simon Fraser University), William Locke Wheeler (Tanazafabrik, Berlin), and Mikhel Proulx produced Try Leather an archive, performance, and on-line project resulting from 5 years of investigation and experimentation with an archive related to Dragu's 1975 performance of the same name.

2012-2014

- The Governor General's Award in Visual and Media Arts 2012 exhibition, at the National Gallery of Canada (Ottawa).
- Rising (nuestra seora del pan) at WIA Projects, Davenport-Perth Community Centre (Toronto, 2012).
- Verb Woman: the wall is in my head/a dance of forgetting (solo exhibition), Richmond Art Gallery (2013–2014).
- Verb Woman (performances) at 7a*11d Biennale (Toronto, 2012) and Stammtisch, Month of Performance (Berlin, 2013).
- The Library Project: Un-Conferences and Un-Symposia, European Centre for Culture & Debate GRAD (Belgrade, 2013), Babble (Babel) Festival, Hart House, University of Toronto (2014), and Brighouse Public Library (Richmond, 2014).
- Lady Justice, in ROSE: 25th Anniversary Montreal Massacre (Vancouver, 2012, 2014).
- Performance at Not Sent Letters & Guests, with Jeremy Todd and others, at VIVO Media Arts Centre (Vancouver, 20014).

2015

- The Library Project: Un-Conferences and Un-Symposia, at Akademia Sztuk Pieknych (Krakow), Blauverschiebung Festival 8 with Jorn Burmester (Leipzig, Germany), and Kamloops Art Gallery (Kamloops, BC).
- The Artist is Working, at Month of Performance Art - Berlin/MPA-B, Grüntaler9 (Berlin).
- Transmitting Trio A (1966) With Sara Wookey, with Yvonne Rainer, Sara Wookey, at Fado Performance Inc., Dancemakers, and Art Gallery of Ontario, at TPW Gallery.

2016

- Library Project and Commodification of Touch, in All membranes are porous (group exhibition) at Kamloops Art Gallery (Kamloops, BC).
- The Library Project: Un-Conferences and Un-Symposia, at Contemporary Art Gallery (Vancouver).
- The Library Project: Un-Conferences and Un-Symposia, with Jorn Burmester at Metro Theatre and City Studio (Victoria, BC).
- Capitalist Duets, with Francesco Gigliardi and Public Recordings at Theatre Centre (Toronto).

2017

- The Library Project: Un-Conferences and Un-Symposia, with Fiona Griffith at 7a*11d Performance Art Festival.
- Tweed Curtain: making the invisible visible, (public performance in Oak Bay), Art Gallery of Greater Victoria (Victoria, BC).

2018

- Lady Justice, at FUSE, Vancouver Art Gallery.

2019

- The Library Project: Un-Conferences and Un-Symposia, at HZT University (Berlin).
- New Normal, an embodied novel: Chapter 4’s & Secret Services, at 7a*11d Performance Art Festival (Toronto).
- New Normal, an embodied novel: Chapter 4, with choreography by Justine A. Chambers, at TTC Oakvale Greenspace, KINESthesis Festival 7a11*d.

2020

- IG Takeover and Performance Readings, grunt gallery.
- New Normal, an embodied novel: the bed is a portal, Chapter Four (choreography by Justine A. Chambers) in The Pandemic is a Portal (group online exhibition), SFU Audain Gallery.

2021

- New Way of Walking: a/mending of the little books, VIVO Media Arts Centre (Vancouver).
- NEW NORMAL: an embodied novel chapter 4, with Justine A. Chambers, at Digital Carnival Z (on-line festival by Cinevolution Media Arts).
- Try Leather, with Justine A. Chambers, William Locke Wheeler, Britta Wirthmüller, on-line and Tanzfabrik Theatre (Berlin).

2022

- New Normal, an embodied novel: Chapter 4’s, at grunthaler 9 (Berlin), Kulturzentrum Faust (Hannover).
- Secret Services at Friisland Centre, Forsøgsstationen Studios, TOEM (Copenhagen, Denmark), grunthaler 9 Gallery (Berlin, Germany), and Kulturzentrum Faust, (Hannover, Germany).

2023

- Skin and Bones: A Chapter 4, with James Long, Jami Reimer, and an ensemble of theatre and performance students at Fei & Milton Wong Experimental Theatre, SFU.
- New Normal, an embodied novel: Chapter 4’s & Secret Services, with Brady Marks and Justine A. Chambers at School for Contemporary Arts (Simon Fraser University, Vancouver), Toronto Metropolitan University, INTERplay Livestreaming Performance Festival, and Friisland Centre, Forsøgsstationen Studios, TOEM (Copenhagen, Denmark).
- More Cleaning It and Loving (It) ...Again, with Jordan King, for Fado's Real to Reel series (Toronto).

2024

- The Library Project: Un-Conferences and Un-Symposia, as International Women's Day Address at Contemporary Art Conversations, Simone de Beauvoir Institute, Concordia University (Montreal).
- Composing and Decomposing Inside of Sick Woman Theory, with Lois Klassen for Mitochondrial Ontologies: Deep Time and the Digital, Critical Media Art Studios, SFU.

2025

- Future Dances - Performing 2075 in 2025, at Dancemakers & FADO (Toronto).

== Film ==
(Incomplete list)

- Surfacing, (actor) also starring Kathleen Beller, R. H. Thomson, Joseph Bottoms, Michael Ironside, directed by Claude Jutra, 1981.
- Memories of Paradise (co-writer, choreographer, performer) Breakthrough Films/TV Ontario production, half-hour, 1985.
- Conserving Kingdom (choreographer) Breakthrough Films/TV Ontario/Ontario Hydro production (half-hour pilot Dudley the Dragon TV series), 1987.
- I Vant to be Alone (co-director, co-writer, choreographer & performer) also starring Jackie Burroughs, Robert des Rosiers, & Claudia Moore Breakthrough Films/TV Ontario/Telefilm/OFDC production, half-hour, 1988.

== Video ==
(Incomplete list)

- "Breath" Video Out Distribution/Western Front Video, 16:00, 1985 (http://www.videoout.ca/catalog/breath)
- "Dance Reading" (with Susan Swan / Lawrence Adams) Video Out Distribution, 23:00, 1985 (http://www.videoout.ca/catalog/dance-reading)
- "Yo Soy Eine Kleine Shopkeeper" Video In/Video Out Distribution, 10:00, 1993 (http://www.videoout.ca/catalog/yo-soy-eine-kleine-shopkeeper)
- "Sleeping Tape" Banff School of Fine Arts, 13:00, 1985 (http://www.videoout.ca/catalog/sleeping-tape)
- "Bardo Gap" (With Bobbi Kozinuk) Video Out/Western Front Video, 18:00, 1994 (http://www.videoout.ca/catalog/bardo-gap)
- "Deconstructed Dollhouse" Video Out Distribution, 20:00, 1996 (http://www.videoout.ca/catalog/deconstructed-dollhouse)
- "Living Art" Video Out Distribution, 7:00, 2001 (http://www.videoout.ca/catalog/living-art)
- "Lady of Shallot - A Surveillance Player" Video Out Distribution, 3:30, 2002 (http://www.videoout.ca/catalog/lady-shallot-surveillance-player)
- "More Cleaning and loving It" Video Out Distribution, 13:00, 2002 (http://www.videoout.ca/catalog/more-cleaning-and-loving-it)
- "Lady Justice and the Epic Burden" (With Moira Simpson) Video Out Distribution, 5:28, 2013 (http://www.videoout.ca/catalog/lady-justice-and-epic-burden)
- "Portals" Video Out Distribution, 13:43, 2013 (http://www.videoout.ca/catalog/portals)
- Also see, "Videography", V Tape Archives, videos spanning 1981 to 2017 (https://vtape.org/artist?ai=550)

== Broadcasting and Digital Media Art ==
Margaret Dragu has produced broadcasts and recordings in series as parallel or alternative to more mainstream media. In an interview with artist Jeremy Todd for VIVO Media Arts Centre, Dragu described the origins of her interest in this format as dating back to the time she was living and working in Toronto, "I have dipped and dabbled in artists making a kind of news magazine TV Talk Show many times — originally, several series with Miriam and (late) Lawrence Adams of 15 Dance Lab in Toronto and also with them and John Faichney in the Artists’ Television Studio also in Toronto. I did hosting, writing, producing and even switching for several live TV series interviewing mostly independent dance choreographers broadcast through a live line from a local cable television station to the studios." Dragu's broadcast-style media art projects include (incomplete list):

- Momz Radio, Vancouver Coop Radio (and other independent University and community radio stations in Canada and the US).
- Verb Woman TV/Verb Frau Television, VIVO Media Arts, at LIVE! Biennale Repair & Care Online (Vancouver), grunthaler 9 (Berlin), 7A*11D Performance Art Festival, MPA-Berlin, Latitude 53 Contemporary Visual Culture (Edmonton), 2011-2021.1
- Art Talking Women, VIVO and Cinevolution, 2016.
- Frugal Friday Flyers (from 2015), Mount Pleasant Community Art Screen 2021-2022, grunt Gallery (Vancouver)
- Tick and Talk of Common Time (2023), Western Front (launch) and Digital Stories Canada.
- Typical Day, a series of short, edited videos about how individual artists spend a typical day, that are posted on Margaret Dragu's Instagram feed (@ladragu), from 2024.
- New Normal: An Embodied Novel, from 2020.

== Writing ==
- Margaret Dragu and A. S. A. Harrison, Revelations: Essays on Striptease and Sexuality, London, ON: Nightwood Editions, 1988 (second printing, 1989).
- Margaret Dragu, Sarah Sheard, and Susan Swan (editors), Mothers Talk Back: Momz Radio, Toronto: Coach House Press, 1991.
- Margaret Dragu, Electric Storm Tale, (play) Herotica II Feminist Erotic Theatre Festival, Ruby Slippers Production, Vancouver: Station Streets Arts Centre, 1995.
- Margaret Dragu, "Confessions," in Brenda Lea Brown (editor), Bringing It Home, Vancouver: Arsenal Pulp Press, 1996, 89–105.
- Margaret Dragu, "The Passion List," in Carol Anderson (editor), This Passion: for the love of dance, Toronto: Dance Collection Danse Press/es, 1998, 9–15.
- Margaret Dragu, "Eye Yam, Eye Yam Not," in Brice Canyon (editor), Live at the End of the Century, Vancouver: Visible Arts Society grunt gallery, 2000, 56–69.
- Paul Couillard (editor), la Dragu, Toronto: Fado Performance Inc., 2002.
- Pam Hall and Margaret Dragu (exhibition catalogue), Marginalia: Getting Out of the House, Richmond, BC: Richmond Art Gallery, 2008.
- Margaret Dragu, "Divining Ms. Irene: The Performance Work of Irene Loughlin," in Johanna Householder and Tanya Mars (editors), More Caught in the Act: an anthology of performance art by Canadian women, Toronto: YYZ Books, 2016, 303–336.

== Independent Publishing ==
Margaret Dragu has issued independent publications (artist books and zines) under the publishing moniker, Same Day Edit including:

- A New Way of Walking: Dragu Worker International, Same Day Edit, 1987.
- Sans Peur, Same Day Edit, 1988
- Footloose, Same Day Edit, 1988.
- Teamster, Same Day Edit, 1991.
- Their End was Bacon, Same Day Edit, 1991.
- Yo Soy The Classics, Same Day Edit, 1992.
- This Order By, Same Day Edit, 1993.
- Breadfellows, Same Day Edit, 1993.
- A Deconstructed Dollhouse, Same Day Edit, 1996.
- The Kinder Face of Germany, Same Day Edit, 1999.
- Public/Private, Same Day Edit, 2001.
- Margaret Dragu, Tweed Curtain Passport/Visa, Dragu Worker International and Art Gallery of Greater Victoria, 2017.
- Margaret Dragu,Tweed Curtain Passport / Visa, (reprint), Reading the Migration Library, Vancouver: Light Factory Publications, 2017.
- NEW NORMAL: an embodied novel, (with French translations by Marie Claire Forté), 2024.
