= Slough (hydrology) =

Type of wetland

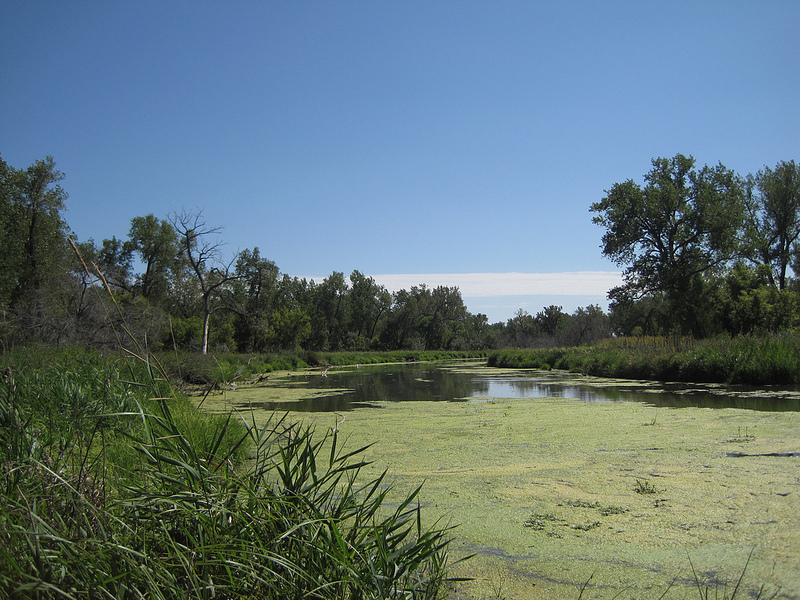
A slough in Nebraska in the United States

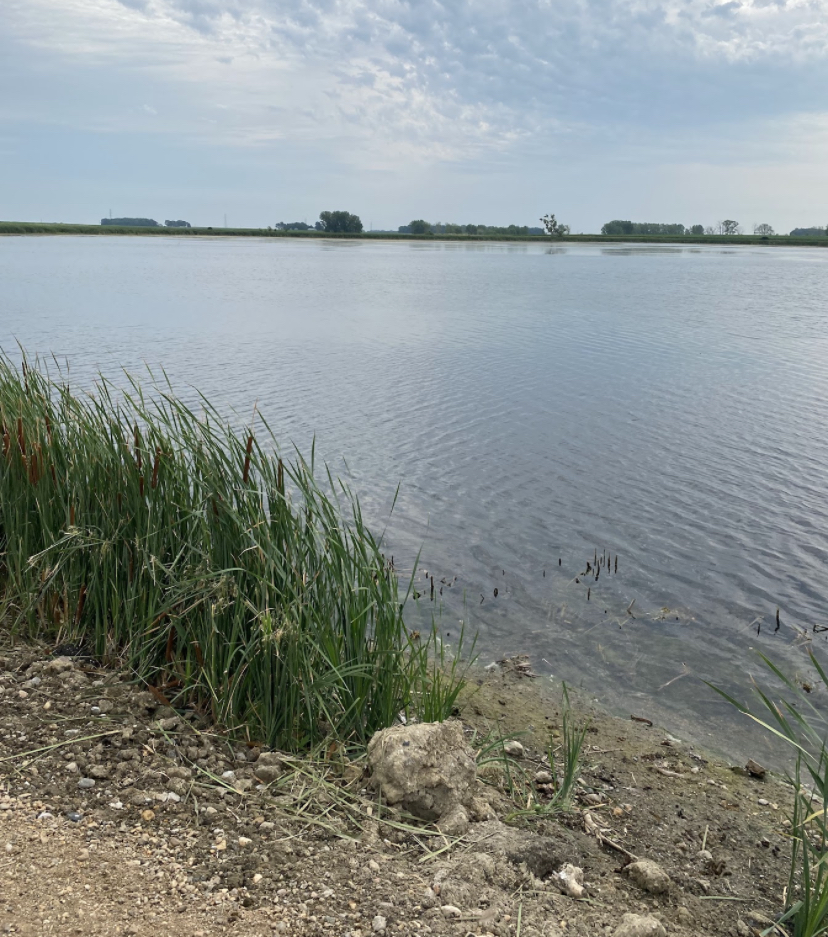
A slough in Maxwell Township, Lac qui Parle County, Minnesota in the United States.

A slough (/sluː/ or /slaʊ/) is a wetland, usually a swamp or shallow lake, often a backwater to a larger body of water. Water tends to be stagnant or may flow slowly on a seasonal basis.

In North America, "slough" may refer to a side-channel from or feeding a river, or an inlet or natural channel only sporadically filled with water. An example of this is Finn Slough on the Fraser River, whose lower reaches have dozens of notable sloughs. Some sloughs, like Elkhorn Slough, used to be mouths of rivers, but have become stagnant because tectonic activity cut off the river's source.

Kettles, shallow lakes or ponds formed by retreating glaciers, in the Prairie Pothole Region of North America are sometimes also known as "sloughs".

== Plants and animals ==
Vegetation patterns in a slough are largely determined by depth, distribution, and duration in the environment. Moreover, these same variables also influence the distribution, abundance, reproduction, and seasonal movements of aquatic and terrestrial life within the sloughs. Sloughs support a wide variety of plant life that is adapted to rapidly changing physical conditions such as salinity, oxygen levels and depth.

In general, sloughs are microhabitats high in species diversity. Open water sloughs are characterized by submerged and floating vegetation which includes periphyton mats dominated by sawgrass typically. The topographical and vegetation heterogeneity of ridge and slough landscape influences the productivity and diversity of birds and fish adapted to that wetland.

Fish that typically inhabit sloughs include the tidewater goby, California killifish, mosquitofish, and topsmelt. Fish in sloughs tend to of prey upon invertebrates, particularly crustaceans, worms and mollusks living in and on the bottom substrate of the slough. Fish also feed on zooplankton and plant material. Research on prey species for fish in California's Elkhorn Slough found that the mean prey richness for fish was greatest near the ocean and lowest inshore. This allows for a higher availability of food to enhance the function of inshore habitats and emphasizes the importance of invertebrate prey populations and how they influence plant production.

Birds also inhabit sloughs, making them hotspots for birdwatching, with the Elkhorn Slough being one of the premier birdwatching sites in the western United States. Over 340 species have been seen visiting, including several rare and endangered species. Bird species seen in sloughs include acorn woodpecker, brown pelican, Caspian tern, great blue heron, great egret, great horned owl, snowy plover, and white-tailed kite.

Sloughs are largely influenced by human development such as urban and agricultural expansion, industrial and agricultural practices, water management practices, and humans influence on species composition. Uses of identifying these aspects of human involvement can help to better predict restoration efforts to be made in managing sloughs. Examples of attributes that are affected by human stress upon the environment include periphyton, marsh plant communities, tree islands, alligators, wading birds, and marsh fishes, invertebrates, and herpetofauna.

== Formation ==
A slough can form when a meander gets cut off from the main river channel creating an oxbow lake that accumulates with fine overbank sediment and organic material such as peat. This creates a wetland or swamp environment. One end of the oxbow configuration then continues to receive flow from the main channel, creating a slough.

Sloughs are typically associated with the ridge formations found in their presence. Such a landscape consists of mosaic linear ridges, typically of some sort of grass such as sawgrass ridges in the Florida Everglades, that are separated by deeper water sloughs.

Edges of sloughs are layers of sediment deposited by a river over time. The development of this landscape is thought to occur by the preferential formation of peat in bedrock depressions. Multiple of these deposits mounted on top of the surrounding bedrock can become elongated alongside the slough and create flow diversions within the system. Different rates of this peat accumulation could be triggered by variations in microtopography that alter plant production and vegetation type. Water flow might be the key to preventing an accumulation of organic sediment in sloughs due to the fact that accumulation leads to lowering water depths and instead allows for the growth of vegetation.

== Degradation ==
Overall little quantitative data on the degradation of slough landscape exists. Slough and ridge landscape has been greatly degraded in terms of both topographic and vegetation changes over time. Topographical changes create an increase in the relief between ridge crests and slough bottoms. Vegetation changes consist of an increase in the amount of dense grass and decrease in the area of open water, creating a blurring of the directional ridge and slough pattern.

Historical everglade and slough landscape has been greatly affected and degraded by human activity. Open water sloughs support important ecological functions that have been seen to be sensitive to hydrologic and water quality problems stemmed from human activities.

== Restoration ==
Sloughs are ecologically important as they are a part of an endangered environment: wetlands. They act as a buffer from land to sea and act as an active part of the estuary system where freshwater flows from creeks and runoff from the land mix with salty ocean water transported by tides. Restoration is a big effort in California wetlands to restore slough and ridge landscapes. Examples of restoration projects on slough landscapes include The Elkhorn Slough Tidal Wetland Project, Dutch Slough Tidal Restoration Project, and the McDaniel Slough wetland enhancement project. The Famosa Slough State Marine Conservation Area is a restored and protected urban slough intended to be part of a statewide network of protected areas along California’s coastline.
