= Justine A. Chambers =

Canadian choreographer

- Known for: Artist, dancer, choreographer
- Awards: Crystal Dance Prize, Lola Award, 2025 VIVA Award
- Website: https://justineachambers.com/

Justine A. Chambers is a dancer, choreographer and artist currently living and working in Vancouver, British Columbia. Interested in social choreographies of the everyday, she engages dance in site-specific, experimental and collaborative creation.

Chambers has performed in public spaces, contemporary art galleries, performance festivals and on stage. She has produced, choreographed and performed internationally at venues such as; the Push Off Festival, Artspeak's Sensing Salon, Studio 303 in Montreal, The Lexicon: Canada Dance Festival, Vancouver Art Gallery, Hong Kong Arts Festival, Art Museum at U of T and Belkin Art Gallery at UBC. Chambers has collaborated with many contemporary artists, including; Marilou Lemmens & Richard Ibghy at Trinity Square Video in Toronto, Evann Siebens at Wil Aballe Art Projects, Brendan Fernandes at Stedelijk Museum in Amsterdam, Jen Weih at Pitt Gallery, Elisa Ferrari at Western Front, Margaret Dragu at Audain Gallery SFU, and a long-time collaboration with artist Josh Hite. She is the mother of Max Tyler-Hite.

== Selected works ==
=== One Hundred More ===
Chambers investigated gesture, rhythm, time and musicality in her work with Laurie Young One Hundred More, in order to connect with embodied, physical movements that reveal recognizable expressions of resistance. This emphasizes her use of gesture as a site of cumulative embodied archives. Known for her pointed observations, and precise dissections she uses conventions of everyday acts to comment on larger social, political and social structures. As a result, her work denies passive spectatorship as her work activates engagement and empathy.

=== Family Dinner ===
Utilizing relational theatre, Chambers's close readings of dinner time antics dissect the physical responses of guests at a dinner table in Family Dinner. She developed a movement vocabulary from social cues and gestures of the dinner conversation such as napkin wiping, drinking, eating gestures among others. She then choreographed the gestures into a theatrical performance, bringing a conceptual negotiation to an overlooked occurrence of our everyday lives. One critic has said about the work; "Chambers's observations so pointed, that in future it's going to be hard for this viewer to regard dining as anything other than a performance, unconsciously choreographed by the participants."

=== It could have been like this ===
"Beginning with the Seventies: Radical Change" at the Morris and Helen Belkin Art Gallery curated by Lorna Brown, Chambers investigates the time-specificity of performance archives. Using Helen Goodwin's Intermedia performances, Chambers and Siebens revisited her gestures in a multimodal installation and performance work that "posited the moving body-as-archive as only ever relative to -and performative of- the fluidity and contingency of time."

=== Waking Hours ===
Inspired by the stay-at-home orders of the 2020 COVID pandemic, Chambers re-directed the embodied recognition of domestic spaces as the new conditions for bodies placement, and closer attention to the rhythms of daily experience. Participants listed materials such as an electric kettle, cat litter, synthetic bristle broom and sewing machine to develop recorded sounds they would contribute to the project available as a sound piece through the Morris and Helen Belkin Art Gallery online. In Waking Hours, Chambers choreographed and edited contributed sounds from artists into a new order.

== Residencies and awards ==
Justine was the Dance Centre (Vancouver) Artist-in-Residence in 2015 where she choreographed dance walks in public spaces, and more recently the National Arts Centre, Visiting Dance Artist Program in Ottawa. Chambers received the Chrystal Dance Prize in 2016, Lola McLaughlin Award and the 2025 VIVA Award.

== Writing ==
Chambers has contributed to the dialogue and discourse surrounding choreographic, artistic, and expanded definitions of dance production. Alongside Alana Gerecke, Chambers wrote Moving Together, 22 Ways in Canadian Theatre Review which invited readers to take up "22 choreographies of the everyday" through disseminated "speculative choreographies" by activating relations between bodies and the built environment they populate.
