= Barbara Cole =

Canadian curator and artist (born 1955)

- Born: 1955; Hamilton, Ontario, Canada
- Education: Diploma in Visual Arts, Sheridan College Diploma in Visual Arts, Alberta College of Art MFA in Sculpture and Textiles, California College of Arts and Crafts, 1982
- Known for: Artist, educator, and curator
- Website: https://www.coleprojects.ca

Barbara Cole (b. 1955) is a Canadian curator, artist, educator, and curatorial consultant in public art. She is the founder of Other Sights for Artists' Projects and principal of Cole Projects.

== Background ==
Cole was born in Hamilton, Ontario. She received a Diploma in Visual Arts from Sheridan College, and a Diploma in Visual Arts from the Alberta College of Art. In 1982, she received her MFA from the California College of Arts and Crafts.

Cole taught at Emily Carr University of Art and Design from 1984 to 1999, and worked as a consultant to the City of Vancouver's Public Art Program from 1999 to 2004. In 2005 she formed Cole Projects, a public art consulting firm, and founded Other Sights for Artists' Projects, a non-profit arts organization. From 2017 to 2023, Cole was the Curator of Outdoor Art for the Morris and Helen Belkin Art Gallery at the University of British Columbia.

In 2007, Cole was awarded the Mayor's Arts Award for her contributions to public art in Vancouver, British Columbia.

In 2013, she was a curatorial resident at ZK/U Center for Art and Urbanistics in Berlin, Germany.

== Curatorial Practice ==
=== Other Sights for Artists' Projects ===
In 2005, Cole founded Other Sights for Artists' Projects (Other Sights), a non-profit arts collective that supports temporary public art projects, assisting with curation, project management, delivery and promotion. She has been a member of the production team since 2014.

=== Morris and Helen Belkin Art Gallery ===
Cole was the Curator of Outdoor Art at the Morris and Helen Belkin Art Gallery at the University of British Columbia from 2017 to 2023, where she oversaw the University's outdoor art collection in partnership with the University Art Committee (UAC). Cole and the UAC shifted the focus of UBC's outdoor art collection towards artist residencies and commissioning site-specific works that engage with UBC's history and location on the unceded, traditional and ancestral territories of the Musqueam (šxʷməθkʷəy̓əmaɁɬ təməxʷ) First Nation.

In an interview with University Affairs magazine, Cole described her curatorial projects at UBC as working to "interrogate the circumstances of a work’s creation, encourage viewers to interact with the site of an artwork and to consider the political nuances of public space."

Notable projects during this period include:

- Fireweeds Fields (2019-2024), a temporary public art project that was part of Vegetal Encounters, Holly Schmidt's artist residency in the Outdoor Art Program, which transformed the Belkin’s lawns into a fireweed meadow. Schmidt has spoken on her interest in the fireweed's capacity to adapt and grow after major environmental disturbances, bringing to mind "notions of healing, care and the resurgence of life, all of which take on heightened importance in the midst of the climate emergency and the need for climate justice.” The project was a collaboration between the Belkin, the Sustainability Initiative and the Botanical Garden’s Horticulture Training Program at UBC.
- Sonic Responses (2020), a series of site-specific performances by faculty and student performers from UBC's School of Music, which explored the shuttered University's outdoor spaces during the first months of the COVID-19 pandemic. The project was led in collaboration with David Metzer, Professor of Musicology and Chair of the University Art Committee, and Judith Valerie Engel, a doctoral candidate in piano performance.

She directed the installation of The Shadow (2018) by Esther Shalev-Gerz and led the sitings and installations of donations to the Outdoor Art collection including Stela I and Stela II (1963) by Elza Mayhew and θəʔit, (2023) by Kayám̓ Richard Campbell and James Hart 7idansuu (Edenshaw), a carved and cast bronze disc at the base of the Reconciliation Pole: Honouring a Time Before, During and After Canada’s Indian Residential Schools (2015-17). In addition, she oversaw the restoration and re-location of Robert Murray’s Cumbria (1966-67/1995) and Untitled (Symbols for Education) (1958) by Patricia and Lionel Thomas.
