= John Massey (artist) =

Canadian artist

- Born: July 6, 1950 (age 76); Toronto, Ontario
- Education: Trent University; OCAD University
- Known for: Contemporary artist Video artist Photographer; Installation artist
- Awards: 2002 Iskowitz Prize for Visual Arts
- Website: www.johnmassey.ca (archived)

John Massey (born July 6, 1950) is a Canadian artist from Toronto, Canada. Since the 1980s, Massey's installations, sculptures, and films have established him as one of Canada's prominent contemporary artists. Massey combines conventional photography with computer manipulation. In his photograph and video projects he uses minimal effects to create works that inhabit a middle ground between the depicted and the created. His works are widely exhibited and are in many private and public collections, including the Art Gallery of Ontario, the Stedelijk Museum in Amsterdam, the Fonds National dâ Art Contemporain, Paris, and the Ydessa Hendeles Art Foundation. In 2006, Massey's work was included in the exhibition "Beyond Cinema: The Art of Projection" at the Hamburger Bahnhof in Berlin. In 2014, his works were included in the Montreal Biennale. He was awarded the Gershon Iskowitz Award for lifetime achievement in 2001.

== Early life and family ==
Massey is the son of architect, Hart Massey II, and grandson of the first Canadian-born Governor General, Vincent Massey. Massey spent his early life in Toronto before moving to Ottawa at the age of eight. The house Massey grew up in was designed by his father in the manner of the renowned modernist architect, Ludwig Mies van der Rohe. This house provided Massey with his first introduction to modernism, a stark, minimalist aesthetic that would become a hallmark of his work. Massey later re-inhabited the house for a short time to photograph it for his 2004 series Phantoms of the Modern.

In 1971, he attended Trent University in Peterborough where he studied English and History, later transferring to the Ontario College of Art and Design (now OCAD University). From 1981 to 1983, he was hired by OCAD to teach Experimental Arts.

Massey was married to the late Canadian author and artist, Susan Harrison.

Currently, he teaches as a Professor at the University of Toronto, in the John H. Daniels Faculty of Architecture, Landscape and Design.

== Works ==
=== As the Hammer Strikes (1982) ===
Originally produced in 1982 in 16mm film, this triptych details a real time conversation between the artist and a hitchhiker he picked up in Southern Ontario. Massey used three screens to convey the intricacies of communication, visually portraying misunderstandings and thought processes. As he converses with a hitchhiker, the screens alternate between images of the landscape, the driver and his passenger, and stock footage shots of the things they talk about. The conversation between the two strangers is somewhat banal, consisting of typical small talk about where they live and work. Their social differences surface first, but it is clear that they want to communicate and work hard to find common ground through their immediate attempt to find common points of interest and struggle to understand one another.

In 2014, artist Will Kwan produced a work entitled If All You Have is a Hammer, Everything Looks Like a Nail, replacing Massey and his hitchhiker with a White real estate agent and an Asian home-buyer as the passenger as they travel to visit prospective homes for sale, driving from a suburban neighbourhood in Markham, Ontario.

=== The House that Jack Built (1981–1992) and The Jack Photographs (1992) ===
The House that Jack Built draws its name from the famous children's rhyme, This Is the House That Jack Built. In this series, Massey intersperses the rhyme with his own lived experience and exploration of male sexuality. The opening image in his photographic suite shows a replica of Massey's Toronto studio with its filing cabinets, work table, stool and ladder to a loft. Overlaid atop this interior view is a montage of images that reflect on each verse of the rhyme, but with some unexpected twists. The verse "This is the maiden all forlorn" is illustrated by the image of a female stripper, turned away from the viewer with her hands over her head. The "cock that crowed in the morn" is an erect phallus and the "cow with the crumpled horn" is, improbably, a rhinoceros.

Throughout the 1990s, Massey presented the subject of "Jack" in several incarnations, exploring the then-new technology of Photoshop to splice images of his own real body – his hands, feet, eyes, phallus – onto the wooden body. Using a small wooden artist's mannequin, Massey presents an artist-as-model-human or self-as-Everyman dialogue. The Jack Photographs series is an early example of digital photography. Part of the series is located at the CIBC Wood Gundy.

=== This Land (2005) ===
This Land is a series of photographs depicting the interiors of high-end automobiles with tranquil scenes such as sunsets or oceans outside. The interior and exterior components were separately photographed in great detail by using a large-format camera and then digitally combined, resulting in hyperrealistic imagery. Massey references tropes of car advertising and positions the luxury car as the epitome of modernism.

=== After Le Mépris (2010) ===
Continuing his study of idealized interiors, the After Le Mépris photograph series was inspired by the central scene in Jean Luc Godard's 1963 film, Le Mépris. In this series, the interiors are modelled on the unfinished apartment in Rome where Godard which portrays a final breakdown of communication between the two lovers in the film. Massey built a scale model of the apartment, shot each of its nine rooms, and configured his pictures with motifs from the film, including its strong primary colours and distinct lighting. The series features a crisp white space with primary colored objects that were scattered by the actors in the film. Massey has stated that, "the apartment was a really loaded interior, and I'm really drawn to the inside of things, both literally and figuratively. It's sort of an apartment in the making that's becoming unmade, both figuratively and literally — the apartment is under construction, while the relationship is falling apart."

=== Black on White (2010–2014 ) ===
Black on White is a series of six prints of digitally scanned collages consisting of words: letters, numbers, punctuation marks bursting from a blank background. The works begin with individual words and photographs found in books, magazines and period films which are meticulously hand-cut from black paper and arranged on a white surface. Each of these is produced as an edition of three archival digital prints mounted on disband with one artist's Proof .
