= Mimi Gellman =

Mimi Gellman is an Ashkenazi/Anishinaabe Métis interdisciplinary visual artist, designer, scholar and educator. Holding a PhD from Queen's University, her research focuses on the metaphysics of Indigenous mapping. She delves into the intersection of phenomenology and intuitive technologies, utilizing embodied practices like walking and mapping, as well as installations that highlight the animate nature of objects. Gellman exhibits and participates in residencies and is an associate professor, faculty in Culture & Community at Emily Carr University of Art and Design.

== Career ==
Gellman's artistic work "explores the notion that mapping is a relational, contextual endeavor largely based on one's personal geography" and considers the use of mapping to orient oneself.

In her continued work of exploring walking as a performative action, her "dreamwalks" drawings consist of aerial photographs that depict a walk in progress along with a trail imprinted into snow using a handheld GPS tracker. She maps given GPS coordinates to enact the series of walk/drawings via the interface, towards a "map-drawing within" to "exemplify the marriage of psychogeography and the physical re-tracing of the walk, with their powerful impact resonating from the disorienting orientation of their location and position in space." This work was included in the On line exhibition at the Museum of Modern Art in New York in 2011.

Gellman participated in the first phase of Randy Lee Cutler and Ingrid Koenig's Leaning Out of Windows, a SSHRC funded project that connected artists, physicists from TRIUMF and scholars into interdisciplinary collaborations spanning several phases from 2017 to 2020. The collaborative project aimed to explore the nature of reality by framing physics topics for artistic interpretation, in which Gellman produced a series of six drawings titled "Invisible Landscapes" made of conte on Japanese Obonai paper. John O'Brian reveals Gellman's artistic contribution to the project as addressing "resonances she finds between indigenous knowledge, art, and science" as she poses inadequacies of European languages to articulate relations. Gellman's observations of the "Ojibwe language Anishinaabemowin, is to privilege verbs over the noun-based constructions of western languages. Now we're in a universe not of things but of energy, flux, and movement" and the resulting artistic work assembles "dialogic memories and scientific data with Ojibwe patterns and symbols of Ojibwe entities to form new narratives." Gellman wrote of her research in the Leaning Out of Windows: An Art and Physics Collaborations catalogue, wherein her conclusion deliberates her experience in mixing art and science methods in their ongoing attempt to accept or eliminate the unknown. She offers that by "shifting our lens to include Indigenous concepts of kinship and animacy and embracing embodied understandings of our inherent relationality rather than merely attempting to explain them, we may successfully achieve the impossible: reconciling our perpetual interaction with otherness."

Creative Resilience in Precarious Times displays a series of artist brushes drawing from "Indigenous approaches of care-full harvest that recognized the inherent kinship between the human and non human" while also countering extractive consumerist mindset with sustainable intentions. Collected with student collaborator Yaazin Pillay, the work features local leaves of grass, bear and caribou fur, muskrat hair, horse tail, wolf and rabbit and seal fur assembled into 54 diverse brushes.

As an author, Gellman contributes to C magazine, and various books, such as Mapping in, on, towards Aboriginal space: trading routes and an ethics of artistic inquiry.

== Awards ==
In 2023, Gellman received the West Coast Teaching Excellence Award (WCTEA) for her development of innovative, hybrid studio courses and work towards decolonization and Indigenization of art and design theory and practice. Gellman states that the acknowledgement emphasises the "importance of Indigenous pedagogical and methodological innovation in post-secondary education in Canada – a recognition of a way of teaching that encourages wholism and wonder, kindness and generosity, creative resilience, personal observation and accountability, and co-operation and relationship-building above all else."
