= Evann Siebens =

Canadian dancer, artist and filmmaker

- Born: Calgary, Alberta, Canada
- Known for: Performance art, media art, dance film
- Website: http://evannsiebens.com/

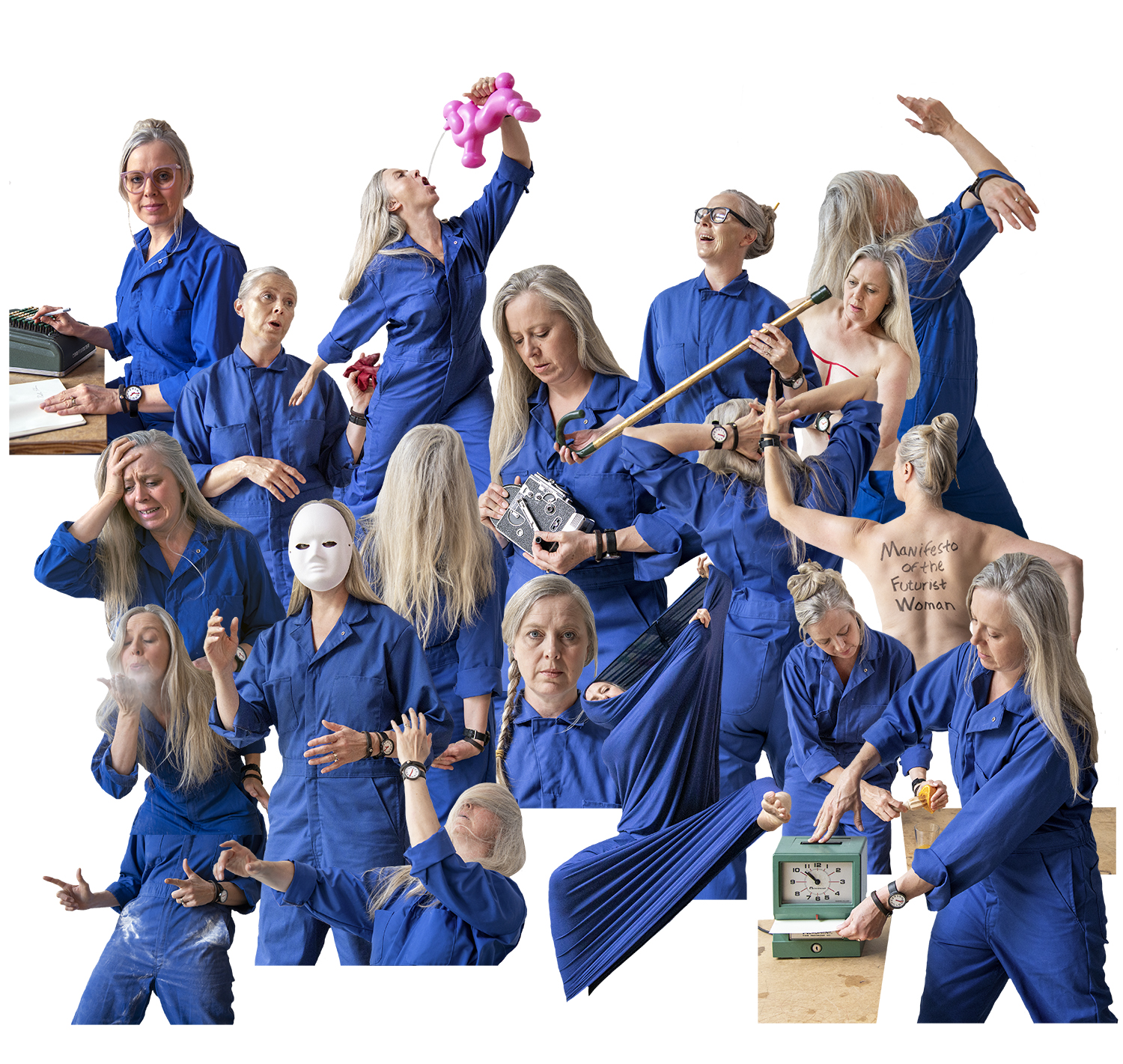
A collage of gestures referencing performance, media and visual artists by Evann Siebens, 2021

Evann Siebens is a Canadian multi-disciplinary artist based in Vancouver, British Columbia, Canada while her lens-based practice negotiates the human body as an archival site and the politics of the female gaze. Her practice cross-references film, media, photo, performance art, and dance. Siebens' film works have been shown both nationally and internationally and have won awards. She worked as a dance cinematographer for many years and shot dancers such as Mikhail Baryshnikov and Lucinda Childs. Her work from ‘A Performance Affair’ in Brussels, Belgium was featured on the front page of the International New York Times in 2019.

Siebens writes about dance films and techniques for applying filmmaking to dance, and has been praised for her practical insights into the filming of dance and the creative interactions between dance and film technique which she credits for expanding the cinematic experience: “I’m interested in breaking the frame, in moving beyond the traditional two-dimensional space of film, in questioning the status quo. The visual transgressions of dance media, that on the surface seem so simple and pleasing, are an entry point for feminists and activists to have their say, an allowance for the complexity of politics, enabled by the moving body through time and space.”

Siebens is represented by Wil Aballe Art Projects in Vancouver.

== Education ==
Evann Siebens studied dance at the National Ballet School of Canada and the Royal Ballet School in London, England. She danced with the National Ballet of Canada and the Bonn Ballet in Germany. Siebens also danced with contemporary dance companies Kunst-Stoff, with choreographer Yannis Adoniou, and Danzaisa, with choreographer Gabri Christa. Siebens graduated from New York University in 1996, with a Bachelor of Arts, magna cum laude. She participated in residencies at the Banff Centre, Banff, Calgary, UNIT/PITT, Vancouver, ACME, London UK, with Keith Doyle and TRII Art Hub Residency in Athens, Greece.

== Publications ==
Siebens' work is cited and referenced in several publications, having most recently contributed to Beginning with the Seventies, 2020 (edited by Lorna Brown) and Leaning Out of Windows: An Art and Physics Collaboration, 2023 (edited by Randy Lee Cutler and Ingrid Koenig). She also contributed the essays ‘Dancing with the Camera: The Dance Cinematographer’ to Envisioning Dance on Film and Video, 2002 (edited by Judy Mitoma) and ‘Choreography for Camera: A Historical Perspective’ to Dance on Camera: a Guide to Dance Films and Videos, 1998 (edited by Louise Spain). The Indexical, Alphabetized Mediated, Archival Dance-a-Thon! Artist book was published by WAAP in 2019.

== Awards ==
Siebens has received notable awards in her career as an artist, such as; Light Moves Festival Prize for Outstanding Overall Work in Limerick Ireland, 2018; MIMMiC Commission from On Main Gallery + Paul Wong Projects, Vancouver, Canada, 2015; ID / Identities Istanbul 2012; Best Video Prize, 2012; Golden Cine Television Award, 2003; Best Website/Best Experimental Film FILE: 04 Media Festival, Buenos Aires, Brazil, 2003; 3rd Prize Cinema, Moscow International Film Festival, Moscow Russia, 2003; Certificate of Recognition, American Dance Festival, 2003; Creative Excellence Award, ABC Television, 2003; SABAC Award, Grand Prix International Video Danse, Stockholm Sweden, 1997. Her work has been supported by The Canada Council for the Arts, the British Columbia Arts Council, The National Endowment for the Arts, The New York State Council for the Arts, and The Corporation for Public Broadcasting amongst others.

== Selected Exhibitions, Performances and Screenings ==
- Colour Bars + Tone, Cloud Seven performance + WAAP exhibition, Brussels, Belgium, 2024.
- A Lexicon of Gesture, PET Projects, Athens, Greece, 2022.
- A Lexicon of Gesture, MACBA, Museu d’Art Contemporarani de Barcelona, Barcelona, Spain, 2021.
- Pedestrian Protest, Offsite: Vancouver Art Gallery, Vancouver, Canada, 2021.
- 100 Ways to Live a Moment, Pushkin State Museum of Fine Arts, Moscow, Russia, 2020.
- A Lexicon of Gesture, Melly Kunstinstituut, Rotterdam, Netherlands, 2020.
- Time Reversal Symmetry, Ann Arbor Experimental Film Festival, Michigan, USA, 2020.
- A Lexion of Gesture, Vancouver Art Gallery, Vancouver, Canada, 2020.
- A Lexicon of Gesture, A Performance Affair, Brussels, Belgium, 2019.
- W-E-L-C-O-M-E to PoCo, public art street banners, City of Port Coquitlam, Canada, 2019.
- Time Reversal Symmetry, Dance on Camera Festival, Lincoln Centre, NYC, USA, 2018.
- Orange Magpies Triptych, public billboard, Capture Photography Festival, Vancouver, Canada, 2018.
- Plus theCo, Minus Helen Goodwin, geodesic dome media installation, Belkin Gallery, Vancouver, Canada, 2018.
- Orange Magpies, Façade Fest, Vancouver Art Gallery, Vancouver, Canada, 2017.
- The Indexical, Alphabetized, Mediated, Archival Dance-a Thon! Wil Aballe Art Projects, Vancouver, Canada, 2016.
- Translating the Archive, performance, Western Front, Vancouver, Canada, 2016.
- deConstruction, Burrard Arts Foundation, Vancouver, Canada, 2015.
- IcarusCar, Harcourt House, Edmonton, Canada, 2012.
- IcarusCar, The New Gallery, Calgary, Canada, 2009.

== Projects ==
External videos
- Evann Siebens, Time Reversal Symmetry, 2018
- Evann Siebens, The Indexical Dance-a-Thon!, 2016
- Evann Siebens, Chromatic Revelry, 2011
- Evann Siebens, image/Word.not_a_pipe=(Magritte), 2002
- Evann Siebens, POTHEAD, 1998

=== Pedestrian Protest ===
In 2021, Siebens, along with Keith Doyle, collaborated with nearly 50 local dancers, visual artists and activists to create Pedestrian Protest, a site-specific installation commissioned by the Vancouver Art Gallery. The project included 24 media performances that referenced a historical or recent protest and explored how the moving body, whether in solitude or en masse, can become a political act. Incorporating image and sculpture into a multimedia installation, Pedestrian Protest considered themes of gathering and protest along Georgia Street—a connective artery that runs through the unceded territories of the xʷməθkʷəy̓əm (Musqueam), Sḵwx̱wú7mesh (Squamish) and səl̓ilwətaɁɬ (Tsleil-Waututh) nations.

=== A Lexicon of Gesture ===
Siebens conceived A Lexicon of Gesture in 2019, a variable media, photo and performance piece that researched and retrieved from dance, visual and performance art histories which was initially performed for A Performance Affair in Brussels, Belgium. A Lexicon of Gesture and variations of the piece were performed in-person and through digital streaming by Siebens at institutions including the Melly Kunstinstituut (formerly Witte de With) in 2020, Vancouver Art Gallery in 2020, Museum of Contemporary Art Barcelona in 2021, and at PET Projects in Athens in 2022. Following the initial performance of A Lexicon of Gesture at A Performance Affair, Siebens received press coverage from the New York Times and was featured on the front cover of the International New York Times and the outlet's web edition.

=== W-E-L-C-O-M-E to PoCo ===
In 2019, Siebens was commissioned by the City of Port Coquitlam’s Street Banner Program and Capture Photography Festival to create a set of Photographic Street Banners hung in civic squares and major city throughways in Port Coquitlam, British Columbia. W-E-L-C-O-M-E to PoCo, which reflects and highlights the welcoming spirit of the community of Port Coquitlam, featured images of local residents of diverse ages and cultural backgrounds in front of iconic sites and landmarks.

=== Plus TheCo, Minus Helen Goodwin ===
In 2018 Siebens collaborated again with Keith Doyle to create Plus TheCo, Minus Helen Goodwin, a sculptural 20 foot metal geodesic dome, with a dancefilm in three parts at the Belkin Gallery in Vancouver. Commissioned by Lorna Brown, curator at the Belkin Gallery, the piece explores the overlooked Canadian female choreographer Helen Goodwin, a founding member of Intermedia in the 1960s as well as TheCo, a dance troupe based in Vancouver, B.C. Siebens worked with choreographers James Gnam and Vanessa Goodman, visual artist Anne Ngan and several Vancouver based contemporary dancers to realize the pieces.

=== Orange Magpies ===
Siebens' performance film Orange Magpies was commissioned by Vancouver's Burrard Arts Foundation and Vancouver Art Gallery in 2017. This work was subsequently exhibited as a large-scale projection on the facade of the Vancouver Art Gallery as part of the Facade Festival that same year. Siebens' video documented a six minute dance film performed by choreographers James Gnam and Vanessa Goodman. They are featured in locations from across the Lower Mainland of Vancouver, many of them unceded traditional territories of First Nations peoples such as the Coast Salish, the Squamish, the Tsleil-Waututh and the Musqueam. Siebens' intent as a non-Indigenous artist was "to use the mediums of dance and film to explore issues of colonialism and her role in reconciliation."

=== time reversal symmetry ===
Siebens' 2018 film time reversal symmetry was part of a collaboration between artists and scientists at TRIUMF: Canada’s national laboratory for particle and nuclear physics. It screened at the Dance on Camera Festival in New York City, the Seyr Festival in Tehran, Iran, the Dublin Dance Festival and the Light Moves Festival of Screendance in Limerick, Ireland, where it won the Light Moves Prize for Outstanding Overall Work. The work was also exhibited at the Pushkin State Museum of Fine Arts in Moscow.

=== The Indexical Dance-a-Thon! ===
In 2016 Siebens created a 26 monitor installation entitled, The Indexical Dance-a-Thon!, described as a "mediated lexicon of how to shoot dance". Using her archive of film and years of shooting dance, Siebens created a personal manifesto using film, collage, text and projection. The project was exhibited in Canada, the U.S., Europe, and West Asia and was accompanied by a publication that was published in 2019.

=== deConstruction ===
Siebens created deConstruction in 2015, a series of photos and films that capture the dismantling of the city of Vancouver. By bringing dance to demolition, Siebens points out that ageism applies to architecture as it does to dancers' bodies. deConstruction has been showcased widely across Canada.

=== Chromatic Revelry ===
Siebens' 2011 piece, Chromatic Revelry is series of 10 short films and accompanying photo installation. The piece connects the ordered harmonic scale of J.S. Bach’s Well-Tempered Clavier with the chaos of rave culture and was shot on Super 8 film in clubs and at raves. The film suggests a timelessness to parties, celebration and dance. Chromatic Revelry has been shown at festivals, exhibitions and screenings throughout Canada, the U.S., and Europe.

=== IMPROV ===
In 2006 Siebens collaborated with Keith Doyle to create IMPROV, an installation shot on 16mm film which makes up five dance film studies that reflect an exchange between the body and the camera. The viewer is asked to question who is the performer and who is the maker as the artist steps into the frame holding a 16mm camera and ‘shoots’ the solos, duets and trios—improving as much as the dancers. IMPROV toured to Paris & Skopje, Macedonia in 2009; the Art Gallery of Calgary in 2007; Mediated Bodies in Dublin, Ireland in 2007; Screendance, American Dance Festival, Durham in 2006; Cinedans – Interactive Dance Film at Mediamatic, Amsterdam, The Netherlands in 2006; Goethe Institute & Deutsches Tanz Archive in Krakow, Poland in 2006; Monkey Town Screening in Brooklyn, New York in 2006 and DanceLenz Indian Film Festival in Delhi, India in 2006.

=== American Aloha ===
Sieben's 2003 documentary film American Aloha, focuses on the history and rebirth of hula dancing. It was produced for the PBS POV series.^{[19][20]} Filmed over a period of five years, it focuses on three kumu hula or hula masters teaching in California: Sissy Kaio of Hula Halau O Lilinoʻe, Mark Kealiʻi Hoʻomalu of Na Mele Hula ‘Ohana and Patrick Makuakāne of Na Lei Hulu I Ka Wekiu.^{[21]} American Aloha won a CINE Golden Eagle Award in 2003, a Silver Hugo Award at the Chicago International Television Festival, and the Bronze Award in Cultural Documentary at WorldFest Houston.^{[22][23]} The film also screened at the Hawai‘i International Film Festival and the Native American Film and Video Festival at the Smithsonian Institution.^{[24]}

=== image/Word.not_a_pipe=(Magritte) ===
image/Word.not_a_pipe=(Magritte) is an experimental cinedance work by Evann Siebens, produced in 2002. The performative installation features three projections and a live dancer in an architecturally designed environment. The work has been shown at global festivals and theatres since 2002, with its most recent screening in 2022.

=== Pothead ===
In 1999, Siebens directed Pothead, a 6 minute dance film which features choreography and performance by Yannis Adoniou. The work features a modern truth seeker who is blinded by the stainless steel pot over his head. The work was exhibited across Canada, the U.S., the U.K., and Europe.
