= A. S. A. Harrison =

Canadian writer and artist (1948–2013)

Susan Harrison (1948 – 14 April 2013) was a Canadian writer and artist who published under the name A. S. A. Harrison. She lived in Toronto and was married to visual artist John Massey.

Harrison made a name for herself with performance art in the late 1960s, collaborating with Margaret Dragu. She worked as a typesetter for Toronto publications, and published several works of non-fiction.

Her only novel, The Silent Wife, published in June 2013, was met with positive reviews. The domestic noir psychological thriller tells the story of the slow murderous disintegration of a marriage. Shortly before the novel's publication, Harrison died of cancer, aged 65.
