= Gabrielle L'Hirondelle Hill =

Canadian artist

Gabrielle L'Hirondelle Hill (born 1979) is a Cree and Métis multimedia artist and writer, living and working in Vancouver, British Columbia, Canada. Through creating sculptures, collage, and installation works with found objects, she explores and questions the capitalistic treatment of land as an economic capital, which leads the land contamination and violence against people living on the land. As a member of BUSH Gallery, Hill is also involved in group art projects, through which artists embody the indigenous way of knowing and art practice, as a means of decentralizing Eurocentric theorization of art. Hill was longlisted for the 2019 Sobey Art Award (West Coast and Yukon). In 2024, she was awarded a VIVA Award by the Jack and Doris Shadbolt Foundation.

== Early life and education ==
Gabrielle L’Hirondelle Hill was born in 1979 in Comox, British Columbia, Canada. She holds a Bachelor of Arts with honors in English (2011) and a Bachelor of Fine Arts in Visual Arts (2014) from Simon Fraser University, Vancouver. Hill graduated with a Master of Fine Arts from the California College of the Arts, Oakland.

== Career ==
=== As a writer ===
Hill’s writing has been published in multiple magazines and books, including in the Capilano Review and in the exhibition catalog, Beginning With the Seventies (Morris and Helen Belkin Art Gallery, 2019). She is also the co-editor of the books including The Land We Are: Artists and Writers Unsettle the Politics of Reconciliation (published by ARP Books, 2009) and Read, Listen, Tell: Indigenous Stories from Turtle Island (Wildred Laurier University Press, 2017).

=== As an artist ===
Incorporating organic materials Hill finds in nature, Hill creates sculptures, installations and collage pieces which explores the complex relationships between settler and Indigenous' economies.

As a member of an Indigenous artist collective, BUSH gallery, Hill seeks the ways of demolishing the Eurocentric models of making and theorizing art, through land-based teaching and practicing Indigenous way of knowing. Hill is an Advisory Committee Member of Simon Fraser University Gallery, and the board member of the Vancouver based non-profit art society, Other Sights for Artist’s Projects.

Hill's work has been exhibited at multiple art galleries in Canada and United States, including the Morris and Helen Belkin Art Gallery, Western Front, Polygon Gallery, grunt gallery, Sunset Terrace, Gallery Gachet, and Unit 17 in Vancouver; Cooper Cole, Gallery TPW, the Woodland School, and Gallery 44 in Toronto; SBC galerie d’art contemporain in Montreal; the Alberta Art Gallery in Edmonton; Stride Gallery in Calgary; SOMArts in San Francisco; and Get This! Gallery in Atlanta, Georgia.

== Selected artworks ==
- Loose Spells is a set of labour-intensive collage painting. The paper was first coated by tobacco-infused Crisco oil repeatedly applied by the artist. The layered oil required several months for paper and applied pigments to dry. Once the paper was fully dried, Hill attached her found materials, including wildflowers, beer can tabs, magazines and knick-knacks from a dollar store, to the paper surface by gluing and sawing. Loose Spells embodies Hill’s ongoing interest to seek the links between the ephemeral and tangible. Visualization of settlers' impact on indigenous culture and living environment through Hill's personal life, is a frequent theme found in her work.
- Coney Island Baby is a film created in collaboration with Jeneen Frei Njootli, Chandra Melting Tallow, and Tania Willard with cinematographers Amy Kazymerchyk and Aaron Leon. It records a collective art project performed during winter in Secwépemc Nation territory. The film captures the process of the artists self-learning how to snare wild rabbits by using knowledge shared by women in Indigenous communities. This piece suggests the life of shared sustenance as an alternative to a capitalist economy.

== Exhibitions ==
Hill's work has been shown in multiple art institutions across North America.

Solo exhibitions include:

- Projects: Gabrielle L’Hirondelle Hill, June 27 - September 13, 2020, The Museum of Modern Art, New York
- Gabrielle L’Hirondelle Hill: Four Effigies for the End of Property, 2020, College Art Galleries at the University of Saskatchewan, Saskatoon
- Gabrielle L’Hirondelle Hill: Money, March 30 - May 12, 2019, Unit 17, Vancouver
- Loose Spells, March 28 - May 4, 2019, Cooper Cole Gallery, Toronto

Group exhibitions include:

- Woven Work From Near Here, September 7 - October 20, 2018, grunt gallery, Vancouver
- Li Salay, May 25 - September 9, 2018, Art Gallery of Alberta, Edmonton
- Summer Institute Session II: Site/ation with BUSH gallery, August 7–24, 2018, Plug In Institute of Contemporary Art, Winnipeg
- bust/boom, May 25 - June 29, 2018, The New Gallery, Calgary
- These Hands, Mar 23 - May 5, 2018, Western Front, Vancouver
- N.Vancouver, November 18, 2017 - April 29, 2018, Polygon Gallery
- Patrick Cruz + Gabrielle L'Hirondelle Hill: Other-Portraits, September 15 - November 3, 2017, Stride Gallery, Calgary
- To refuse/To wait/To sleep, January 12 - April 9, 2017, Morris and Helen Belkin Art Gallery, Vancouver
- Town + Country: Narratives of Property and Capital, January 10 - April 13, 2025, Morris and Helen Belkin Art Gallery, Vancouver
- An Indigenous Present, October 9, 2025 - March 8, 2026, Institute of Contemporary Art, Boston

== Bibliography ==
- Read, Listen, Tell: Indigenous Stories from Turtle Island - Edited by Sophie McCall, Deanna Reder, David Gaertner, and Gabrielle L'Hirondelle Hill, WLU Press
- The Land We Are Artists and Writers Unsettle the Politics of Reconciliation - Edited by Gabrielle L'Hirondelle Hill and Sophie McCall, 2015, ARP Books
