= Jennifer Weih =

Canadian artist and educator

Jennifer Weih is a Canadian artist and educator based in Vancouver, British Columbia. She currently teaches at the Emily Carr University of Art and Design. Weih received her BFA from the Emily Carr University of Art and Design and her MFA from the University of British Columbia. She works in installation, objects, video, and print. Her projects include a range of aesthetics including found, manufactured, or crafted materials. She is part of the production team at Other Sights for Artists' Projects. Weih was a programmer for VIVO Media Arts Centre, which she initiated community oriented projects, and founded Signal and Noise Media Art Festival.

== Exhibitions ==
Weih has had exhibitions both nationally and internationally that include shows at: Western Front, Vancouver, BC (Sound Separation, 2000); Or Gallery, Vancouver, BC (Things' Matter, 2012-13); Unit/PITT Gallery, Vancouver, BC (Open, 2002), Oakville Galleries, Oakville, Ontario (The Jennifer Show, 2002); the London Biennale, London, Ontario; the Pratt Institute, New York City; Burnaby Art Gallery, Burnaby, BC (How Deep is Your Disaster, 2013); The Apartment, Vancouver, BC (Local, 2008); Yukon Arts Centre, Whitehorse, Yukon (The Sleep of Reason, 2012); and the Morris and Helen Belkin Art Gallery at the University of British Columbia, Vancouver, BC.

== Publications ==
She has had writings published by, Lola Magazine, Or Gallery, Access Gallery, and Wreck UBC Graduate Journal.

== Select work ==
Stack of Moves

Stack of Moves (2013) is a work that was presented by the Pitt Gallery as part of the No Wave Festival. The work included elements of modern dance and explorations of movement in a guided class led by Justine Chambers.

Apollo Hall

This work was shown at the Or Gallery (2004) and used the lobby of the gallery to create an immersive experience that uses lighting, texture, sound, furniture and flat sculptural elements. The show was an immersive installation, complete with, sound, lighting, furniture and flat sculptural elements. The installation created a noticeably disconcerting space that called viewers’ subjecthood into question.

=== Sound Separation ===
Sound Separation was an exhibition that took place at Western Front in 2000. The show featured artists such as Jennifer Weih, who work with sound in the context of film, video, new media and installation.
