= Ingrid Koenig =

Canadian visual artist

Ingrid Koenig is a Canadian visual artist, educator, and interdisciplinary researcher whose work connects intuitive responses to scientific notions and geographic spaces. Her practice traverses fields of physics, social history, and feminist theory. Koenig is an Associate Professor at Emily Carr University of Art and Design, and has been the recipient of grants from Canada Council for the Arts, Goethe Institute, and the Social Science and Humanities Research Council. She has exhibited work in public galleries across Canada, Europe, New Zealand.

== Research ==
Koenig's drawings explore the relational phenomena of physics and involve intuitive responses to specific sites through fieldwork in Canada's Rocky Mountains, Germany, Iceland, Arctic Circle art + science expeditions, and through collaborations with physicists. She uses drawing as a method for mapping bio-geo-political interactions of material and energy systems – climate change, geophysical forces, tectonic plates, magnetism, planetary motion, evidence of deep time, navigation - and to consider the language of material forces as conversations between phenomena. Koenig has also used drawing processes combined with aesthetic relationships to scientific visual diagrams to express measurements of domestic life

=== Learning Out of Windows ===
As the first Artist in Residence (2011-2021) at TRIUMF, Canada's particle accelerator centre, she co-organized collaborative programming between artists and physicists. Her research development led to a Social Science and Humanities Research Council Insight Grant in collaboration with Randy Lee Cutler between 2016 and 2025. A nod to the possibilities and pitfalls of interdisciplinary research, the project and catalogue title derives from the German aus dem Fenster lehnen, the project was called "Leaning Out of Windows: Art and Physics Collaborations through Aesthetic Transformations" wherein four key streams made up of cluster groups gathering resulted into a series of exhibitions, and later a publication. The project worked with scientists, artists, humanities and social science scholars seeking to understand the differences between the language they use and how knowledge is developed and visualized, and explore how knowledge is translated across disciplinary communities. Based on the premise that art and physics share critical perspectives around metaphor, analogy, imagination, and creative processes, the research methods of the collaborative streams also realized how disciplines have distinct approaches even within these overlaps in trying to understand our reality.

==== Leaning Out of Windows: An Art and Physics Collaboration Catalogue ====
The years long project resulted in a catalogue edited by Koenig and Cutler, with accompanying essays by authors such as Sadira Rodriques, Mimi Gellman and Marina Roy, is divided into the three experimental phases for interactions that took place over the duration of the project; Antimatter, Emergence, and In/visible Forces. Each contains images of artists' artworks, exhibition results and biographies. Of note, the catalogue contains a series of diagrams drawn by Ingrid that periodically run throughout the book to elucidate concepts from the research. Art Historian John O'Brian details that they "are mesmerizing, a sequence of coloured charts that map the whole enterprise. Initially used as a tool to chart the activities of the collaboration, they seem to have morphed into conceptual artworks over the course of the project. I have spent hours pouring over them, marvelling at their attention to detail and visual sophistication."
