= Holly Schmidt =

- Born: Lacombe, Alberta
- Education: University of Calgary
- Alma mater: Emily Carr University of Art and Design
- Website: hollyschmidt.ca

Holly Schmidt is a Vancouver-based artist whose practice moves across disciplinary boundaries, and incorporates pedagogical, collaborative and social practice approaches. She has taught at Emily Carr University of Art and Design, and as an educational programmer at the Contemporary Art Gallery in Vancouver.

== Select projects ==
=== All the Trees ===
In Fall of 2018, Schmidt instigated a tree mapping project by tagging thirty trees with a unique ID and n email address in the West Point Grey Community Centre and Jericho Park area. The project was inspired by the City of Melbourne tree mapping project, in which individual trees were labeled so that residents could make email reports on damaged or diseased trees; this project was hijacked by citizens sending personal notes of their admiration for the trees. Schmidt created the same system for the trees in Vancouver. Individuals who sent emails to the tree addresses received a reply containing educational information about different species of trees located in the parks. Schmidt worked with historian John Atkin, poet Rahat Kurd, horticulturalist Egan Davis, and indigenous herbalist Lori Snyder as a part of the Artist in Communities program through the Vancouver Park Board.

=== Lost Lessons (Midnight Picnic) ===
Since 2014, Schmidt has employed her father's (a former professor in the sciences) astronomy slide collection that spans over thirty years of diagrams, illustrations, NASA and other observatory photographs and various technical capacities to document the universe. Caitlin Chaisson has described the ongoing series as "stargazing events that explore what it means to be tethered to the Earth". Continuing and supported by a Canadian Council for the Arts grant, a new iteration expanding on the work collaborates with the theatre company Boca Del Lupo.

=== Grow: An Art + Urban Agriculture Project ===
In a public intervention project with Other Sights for Artists' Projects between May and November 2011, Schmidt harvested and engaged local community in a living ecological laboratory in the middle of the city that she called Grow. In a vacant industrial lot near Vancouver's Olympic Village, Schmidt occupied the space with a living garden that brought people together to share their knowledge and experience in sustainable design and Eco-philosophy. Activated by activities such as the Grow Seed Exchange, walking dialogues with disciplinary experts on sustainability including Designer Duane Elverum and Trudeau Scholar Rajdeep Singh Gill, and drop-in workshops on urban farming, visitors practiced new potentials for growing food against the backdrop of high-end condos that mark Vancouver's notorious housing market. Using social practice methods, the events create collaborative, informal, grassroots interaction that model an alternative social structures in contrast to industrial food systems.

The work evolved into other participatory and collaborative events, such as Moveable Feast at Burnaby Art Gallery which featured foraged food and locally found ingredients, honey, spiced mead, fermented beverages, simple cheese making and pickled vegetables. The series provided workshops with underground chefs including Fermented Beverages

=== Vegetal Encounters ===
This 2018- current multi-year residency is in conjunction with the UBC Outdoor Art Program, and the Morris and Helen Belkin Art Gallery. Schmidt refers to her residency and purpose of residency below.

"Through this residency, I am creatively engaging with plant life as a significant source of life, connection and learning. Learning with plant life involves slowing down and using all of the senses to engage deeply and with respect. This involves developing opportunities for students, staff and faculty on campus to attend to the plants around them. This engagement will result in a range of art projects in various mediums and of different durations."

Schmidt refers to this residency on her website in her presentation of Forecast, "a series of daily weather forecasts installed on the windows of the AHVA Gallery over the course of Congress 2019." Using various mediums like vinyl and mirrors, Schmidt uses the language of weather to report the shifting weather conditions outside of the gallery, installing the mirror finished vinyl on the windows of the AHVA Gallery.

== Residencies ==
Schmidt has engaged in participatory projects on food and food mobility through various residencies, such as the Santa Fe Art Institute Food Justice Residency, Mess Hall at the Banff Centre, Lore Residency at Zocalo Organic Farm in Guelph Ontario, Woodland School with Duane Linklater at Artscape in Toronto, among others. Some recent projects include "Amalgamate" (2019) which used a large slab of granite in a gallery setting as a reminder that when geological forms are removed they can't be put back. According to Schmidt, "there is no obvious remediation or restitution."

Schmidts more recent project includes "...like an octopus" (2020) which was a collaborative installation and part of a research creation project called Leaning Out of Windows.
