= Other Sights for Artists' Projects =

Other Sights for Artists’ Projects is an arts collective based in Vancouver, BC. The organisation's mandate states, "Other Sights' projects consider the aesthetic, economic and regulatory conditions of public places and public life." Incorporated as a non-profit society in May 2005, the collective supports temporary public art projects by providing expertise in curation, project management and promotion. Other Sights supports art in spaces and sites accessible to a broad public and as such considers the public realm to be both the built environment, including streets and parks, as well as media and communication technologies.

Other Sights board members include Patrik Andersson, Clint Burnham, Holly Schmidt, Jordan Wilson and Gabrielle L'Hirondelle Hill. The production team includes Lorna Brown, Barbara Cole, Colin Griffiths, Vanessa Kwan, Marko Simcic, Jen Weih, and general manager, Sunshine Frère. Though they do not operate from a fixed address, Other Sights is an artist-run center and a member of the Pacific Association of Artist Run Centers (PAARC).

== Select projects ==
=== Big Rock Candy Mountain (2016 - 2018) ===
Big Rock Candy Mountain is a project by artists Hannah Jickling and Helen Reed. The project took the form of a multi-year artist residency with students from Queen Alexandra Elementary School in East Vancouver.

Through a program of workshops, printed matter, artist editions and installations, BRCM considered the school as a site of production with a variety of capacities and processes. The artists investigated the potential of children as collaborators and sought to challenge intellectual divisions between children and adults, and between fine art and art education. The project expanded traditional ideas about public art by producing a range of outcomes rather than a single finished ‘artwork’. For instance, one outcome of the project was a special bubble gum, designed through taste workshops by the students, and sold as an artists’ multiple.

The project takes its name from "The Big Rock Candy Mountains", a folk song that describes a mythical utopia. The artists chose this title because, as they describe it, “The Big Rock Candy Mountain is a topsy-turvy world, where adults and rationality no longer define the rules and limits of what is possible." Because the project chose to focus on flavor and confectionery it made ideas from art history accessible and interesting to children. Moreover, the project initiated a role reversal whereby children were considered the experts on candy and were consulted by the artists, rather than students being taught. Lucien Durey wrote of BRCM, “The project has proven that socially engaged practices can be funny and accessible while exploring new material approaches and furthering contemporary art dialogues."

As a result of the project, Hannah Jickling and Helen Reed were joint recipients of the 2018 VIVA Award.

=== The Foreshore (2015 - 2018) ===
The Foreshore was a multi-year collaboration between Access Gallery, Contemporary Art Gallery, and Other Sights. It was primarily a series of events, such as talks and discussions, screenings, mini-artist residencies, and open studios. Inspired by the influence of waterways on the cities and societies of the West Coast of Canada, and of the foreshore as a zone of flux and change, the project was an extended think-tank intended to bring about the exchange of ideas.

The Foreshore project had three phases. The first took place between 2016 and 2017 and was focused on intensive research. It featured nineteen collaborative discussion sessions, two field trips, and four residencies. The second phase, from 2017 to 2018, featured four collaborative discussion sessions with a previously participating session artist inviting a new participant to continue on discussing ideas from previous sessions as well as current research. Presenters for Phase II, sessions 1-3 include: Carmen Papalia, Joulene Tse, Coll Thrush, Kamala Todd, Dana Claxton and Jaleh Mansoor. Phase three, "The Foreshore Listens," was an audio zine series commissioned by Other Sights, led by Jen Weih. Each audio zine was edited by an artist, focused on a particular aspect of the Foreshore Sessions, and included ambient recordings, poetry, fragments of interviews, and foley recordings to create a aurally textured piece retirement of self-published artist zines. The series episodes were: "Embodiment" by Stacey Ho, "Water Weight - Friction Possibility" by Dan Pon, "Sea Legs" by Sara Moore, and "We Call You To Witness" by Vanessa Campbell. Sound mixing & design was by Pietro Sammarco.

=== The Blue Cabin (2015 - ongoing) ===
The Blue Cabin is a historic building that has been restored and is currently being incorporated into a floating platform that will function as a site for artist residencies. The project is a collaboration between Other Sights, grunt gallery, and Creative Cultural Collaborations (C3).

Built during the late 1920s or early 1930s, the 280 sq ft wooden cabin was originally a place to live while its owner worked at the nearby shipyard. It was one of many squatters’ dwellings along the Burrard Inlet that provided homes for people who were forced to ‘squat’ by poverty or because they deliberately chose an alternative lifestyle. The cabin was first constructed in Coal Harbour then later towed on a barge and mounted on piles on the Dollarton Mud Flats by Cates Park, Tsleil-Waututh territory, where it stayed until 2015. Although little is known about the original builder of the cabin, the structure's diagonal braces indicate a pre-industrial, northern European technique. Al Neil also recalled being told that the builder was a Norwegian carpenter.

In 1966, Al Neil, a local musician, artist and writer, moved into the cabin and used it as a home. At first, Neil paid rent to the McKenzie Barge and Derrick company but later became an unofficial beach watchman in exchange for free rent. When Neil's partner, artist Carole Itter, joined him in the late 1970s the pair used the cabin as a studio. Neil and Itter made many assemblage artworks in, on and around the cabin in the nearby woods.

When the McKenzie Barge site was sold to Polygon Homes for redevelopment in 2014, the developer was obligated by Port Metro Vancouver to remediate the neighboring contaminated foreshores, including the small bay where the cabin was located. Neil and Itter were served an eviction notice by Port Metro in 2015 and the cabin was to be demolished as part of the remediation work. grunt gallery, Other Sights and C3 were able to move the cabin to a secure storage lot for repair and remediation. In June 2017, the cabin was relocated to a sheep pasture at Maplewood Farm in North Vancouver, where it underwent a full remediation by Mayne Island artists Jeremy and Sus Borsos. The restoration was completed in February 2018. The Borsos treated the restoration project as if it were an archaeological investigation. The cabin was carefully disassembled and all of the objects found within it saved and archived. Each stage of the project was documented, “compiling an archive of some 4000 photographs and a collection of things ranging from newspapers and screws to mud wasp nests and mouse nests that are treated as the specimens of an archaeological dig.” Posters discovered under the floorboards (to prevent it from squeaking) helped to date the construction of the cabin to 1927. An exhibition of the found materials was held at the grunt gallery from June 15 to July 28, 2018.

During this time the Blue Cabin Committee began to develop a concept for the future of the cabin. Plans now include the creation of an engineered floating platform and tiny home in which visiting artists can live while they use the cabin, also on the platform, as a studio. This ‘floating artist residency’ will then be able to move from time to time along Vancouver's waterways.

In 2018, the Blue Cabin received a Change Maker Award from BC Museums Association's Roundup Magazine, and it has recently been nominated for a BCMA Innovation Award.

=== When the Hosts Come Home (2010 - 2014) ===
When the Hosts Come Home was a series of art projects that presented three different collaborative-based artist teams who use recycled and re-purposed materials to produce large-scale sculptural works that addressed the meaning of “legacy” in relation to Vancouver's changing urban identity. The projects were a response to the 2010 Vancouver Winter Olympic and Paralympic Games.

==== Deadhead (2014) ====
The last project in the series, Deadhead, was a floating sculptural installation by Cedric, Nathan and Jim Bomford. The title refers to the industrial history of logging along the coast: a deadhead is a term for log that has escaped from a boom and become waterlogged. Salvaged wood and metal were mounted onto a World War II barge and moored in two locations along Vancouver's waterways during the summer of 2014. The improvised structure of the work referenced the vernacular architecture of the east coast of Vancouver Island, in places such as Hornby Island, Alert Bay, and Sointula. The piece took advantage, originally unintentionally, of its location on the tidal zone as a jurisdictional grey area to comment on issues of land ownership and histories of squatting. Vancouver based writer and curator Kimberly Phillips said of the project, "The barge is tugged into a zone of leisure and capital that has ever-so-successfully concealed its edge, its recent pasts of shoreline squatting, immigrant shanties and specious evictions... If only for a brief moment, one could say, Deadhead conjured the city's uncomfortable pasts."

=== The Larwill Park site projects (2015 - 2017) ===
Upon proposing Larwill Park as the site for its new location, the Vancouver Art Gallery commissioned Other Sights to produce a series of projects in the space. The first project, titled The Inaugural Project (September 2015 - August 2016), referenced the park's history as a space for public gatherings and expressions of public concerns. Sections from documentary photographs of the park's history were cut out, enlarged, printed in bright Pantone colours, and installed around the park. The installed images referenced commercial bill boards and were strategically sited to draw attention to features outside of the site such as pedestrian walk-ways and views of the surrounding buildings.

For the second project, Ovoidism (September 2016 - September 2017), Canadian First Nations artist Lawrence Paul Yuxweluptun produced a series of sculptures of large, brightly colored ovoids. Ovoids are key design features of Northwest Coast Indigenous art but they are rarely depicted alone, usually being an element of a larger design. The art work aimed to draw attention to unresolved Indigenous land claims at Larwill, and Vancouver more generally.
