= Finn Slough =

Village in Richmond, British Columbia, Canada

Coordinates: 49°6′47″N 123°6′56″W

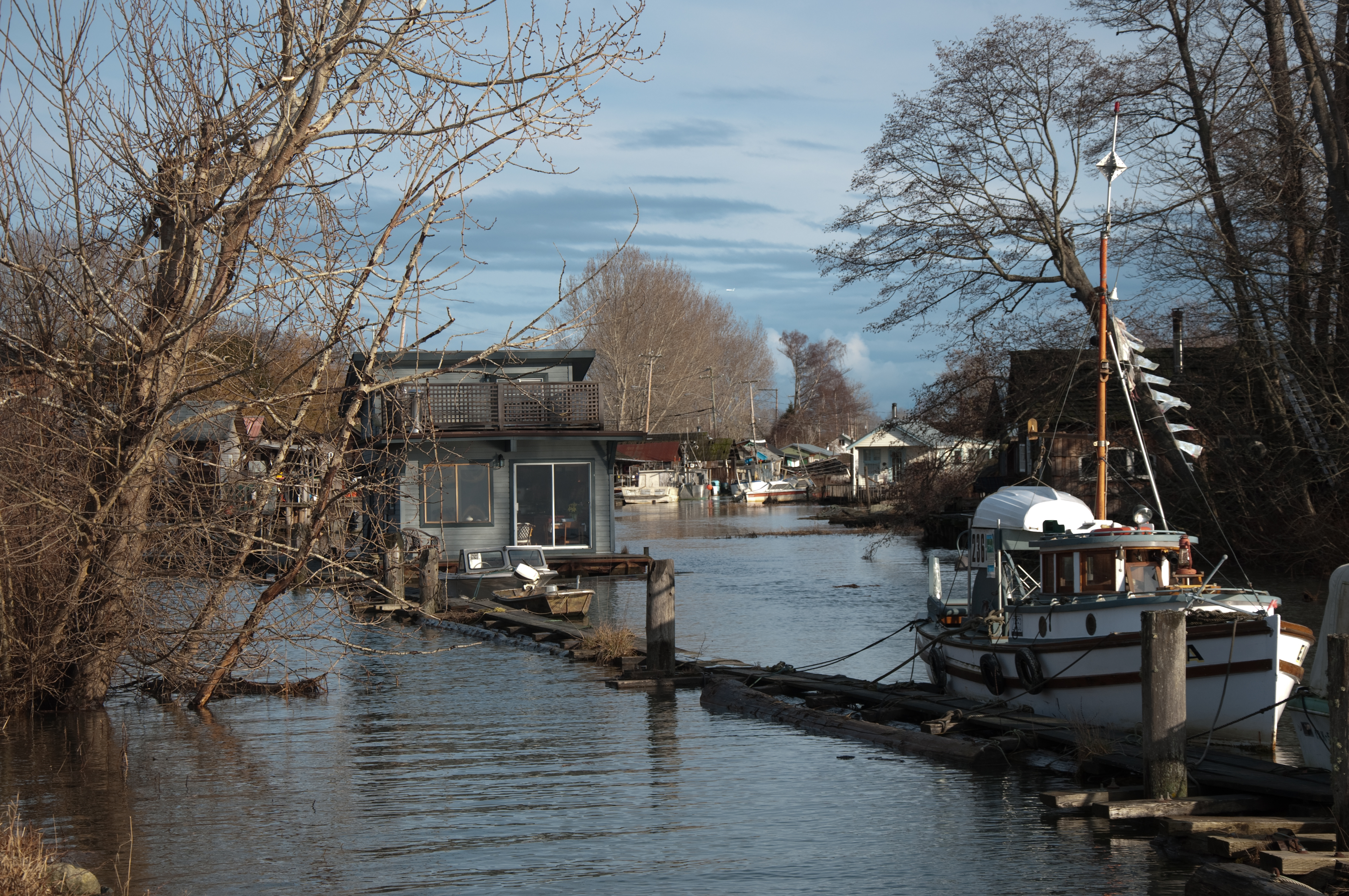
Finn Slough

Finn Slough is a tiny Fraser River fishing community, sometimes referred to as Tiffin Slough. It is located at the south end of No. 4 Road in the rural Gilmore neighbourhood of Richmond, British Columbia, Canada. The community has approximately 30 residents who live in wooden houses, both floating and built on pilings, along the marshy river bank. Many of the buildings were built between the late 19th century and 1950s and many have decayed severely, while some have been carefully restored. Finn Slough was founded by Finnish settlers who came to Richmond in the 1880s. Most of these residents made a good living from fishing and became local landowners.

The sleepy and decaying village of Finn Slough has been repeatedly photographed, and it appears on numerous postcards sold throughout Vancouver tourist shops.
