= Randy Lee Cutler =

- Born: Quebec, Canada
- Known for: Writer, Artist, Educator
- Awards: Ian Wallace Teaching Award, ECU 2011
- Website: https://randyleecutler.com

Randy Lee Cutler (born 1964) is a writer, academic, educator and artist working in Vancouver, British Columbia. She has a PhD in Cultural History from the Royal College of Art. She currently works as a Professor at Emily Carr University of Art and Design in the Faculty of Art.

== Writing ==
Her contribution:Vancouver Singular Plural: Art in an Age of Post-Medium Practice to the seminal Vancouver Anthology; Vancouver Art & Economies edited by Melanie O'Brian and published by Arsenal Pulp Press and Artspeak was reviewed as critiquing the terms of new media by offering an alternative vantage point on artists who embrace plurality, rather than medium specificity, through 'post-medium practices.

Her Essay O My friends…: On Friendship and Artistic Practice was commissioned by artists Marina Roy and Abbas Akhavan for a catalogue on their work published by Malaspina Printmakers Society, Vancouver, BC in 2014. In the essay, Cutler explains; "Beyond its primary role in our emotional lives, there is a particular kind of friendship, a type of intimate relation that resides in what can be described as artistic friendship, edifying and feeding creative endeavors." The essay uses theories of friendship through history, philosophers and cultural thinkers, and evolves its understanding towards its relationship to sensory connections within artistic acts.

=== Select publications and writing ===
- Crystal Queer The Canadian Journal of Poetry and Critical Writing, 2015
- On Speculative Walking: From the Peripatetic to the Peristaltic C Magazine, 2014
- Review: Il Palazzo Enciclopedico: The 55th International Art Exhibition C Magazine, Fall 2013
- FeminismS without End... FUSE Magazine, Fall 2012
- Making Metaphors*A Spectrum of Difference Fillip Review, Spring 2009

== Art practice ==
Randy Lee Cutler works in various media from collage to performance, textual practices, digital e-books and posters. Her alias, Hedda Cabbage made an appearance at Fuse at the Vancouver Art Gallery co-presented by Live Biennale.

=== Leaning Out of Windows ===
Led alongside Ingrid Koenig, this SSHRC funded, four-year project ran from 2016 to 2020, and was designed to bridge the gap between art and science through interdisciplinary collaboration. It brought together faculty and students from Emily Carr University, visiting artists, and physicists from TRIUMF at the University of British Columbia, in an aim to explore and understand the nature of reality using the combined perspectives of various disciplines. Through several phases of collaboration, exhibition, and analysis, the project culminated a publication with essays authored by Cutler, and showcases interdisciplinary work by artists such as Marina Roy, Mimi Gellman, and its broader implications for knowledge and communication.

=== Saltwalks ===
Saltwalks:Three Movements in conjunction with Access Gallery, was a work that consisted of performative "interactions with the public initiated through taste tests of different kinds of edible salt". As a work of social practice, the walks began with a salt tasting and led into an understanding salt's influence in social and cultural development. The three walks were each navigated within a theme. The first theme of herbal medicine featured Chinese herbal remedies with herbalist Albert Fok The second on food preservation exposed participants to the influence salt and salt extraction had on food, the geography, and harvests and featured local artist Howie Tsui. The final walk focused on the crystal structures of salt towards a vibrational healing energy power and featured a visit with local Chinatown crystal shop owner, Edward Gutierrez.

=== Open Wide ===
In 2014 she released Open Wide: An Abecedarium for the Great Digestive System, an ebook on digestion as a metaphor for experience. The book mimics the digestive system, and its chronology is run by the alphabet. It features illustrations, media and sound by Abbas Akhavan, Myron Campbell, Gaye Chan, John Cussans, Geoffrey Farmer, Kristina Fiedrich, Monique Fouquet, Allison Hrabluik, Elvira Hufschmid, Ingrid Koenig, Germaine Koh, Elizabeth MacKenzie, Liz Magor, Graham Meisner, Cindy Mochizuki, Damian Moppett, Ranu Mukherjee, Ryan Peter, Marina Roy, Margit Schild, and Holly Schmidt.

=== Select exhibitions/screenings ===
- Salt Walks, for part of the group show Gleaners, Nanaimo Art Gallery, BC 2015
- A Joyful Wisdom collages and vitrine installation, part of the group show Beside Yourself, AHVA Gallery, Audain Art Centre, University of British Columbia, 2014
- Salt Walks: Three Movements, at VIVO Media Arts Centre, Vancouver, BC, 2014
- By Way of the Intersection, part of the Shelved curatorial project with Burnaby Art Gallery and Artspeak Gallery, Vancouver, BC, 2014
- Salt Walks: Three Movements, at Dr. Sun Yat-Sen Classical Chinese Garden in collaboration with Access Gallery, Vancouver, BC, 2014
- Kitchen Semiotics, Innovate Heritage: Conversations between Arts and Heritage, an international trans-disciplinary conference, Berlin, Germany, 2014

== Interviews ==
- Jeremy Todd: A Conversation w/Randy Lee Cutler
