= Picture for Women =

Photograph by Jeff Wall

- Artist: Jeff Wall
- Year: 1979
- Type: photograph
- Medium: cibachrome transparency mounted on a lightbox
- Dimensions: 204.5 cm × 142.5 cm (80.5 in × 56.1 in)
- Location: Musée National d'Art Moderne, Paris

Picture for Women is a photographic work by Canadian artist Jeff Wall. Produced in 1979, Picture for Women is a key early work in Wall's career and exemplifies a number of conceptual, material and visual concerns found in his art throughout the 1980s and 1990s. An influential photographic work, Picture for Women is a response to Édouard Manet's Un bar aux Folies Bergère and is a key photograph in the shift from small-scale black and white photographs to large-scale colour that took place in the 1980s in art photography and museum exhibitions. It is the subject of a monographic book written by David Campany and published as part of Afterall Books' One Work series.

== Background ==
Jeff Wall, born September 29, 1946, in Vancouver, is a Canadian artist best known for his large-scale back-lit cibachrome photographs and art history writing. Wall has been a key figure in Vancouver's art scene since the early 1970s. Early in his career, he helped define the Vancouver School and he has published essays on the work of his colleagues and fellow Vancouverites Rodney Graham, Ken Lum and Ian Wallace. His photographic tableaux often take Vancouver's mixture of natural beauty, urban decay and postmodern and industrial featurelessness as their backdrop.

Wall experimented with conceptual art while an undergraduate student at the University of British Columbia. Wall then made no art until 1977, when he produced his first backlit phototransparencies. Many of these pictures are staged and refer to the history of art and philosophical problems of representation. The photographs' compositions often allude to historical artists like Diego Velázquez, Hokusai, and Édouard Manet, or to writers such as Franz Kafka, Yukio Mishima, and Ralph Ellison.

== Description ==
Picture for Women is a 142.5 by 204.5 cm cibachrome transparency mounted on a lightbox. Along with The Destroyed Room (1978), Wall considers Picture for Women to be his first success in challenging photographic tradition. According to Tate Modern, this success allows Wall to reference "both popular culture (the illuminated signs of cinema and advertising hoardings) and the sense of scale he admires in classical painting. As three-dimensional objects, the lightboxes take on a sculptural presence, impacting on the viewer's physical sense of orientation in relationship to the work."

There are two figures in the scene, Wall himself, and a woman looking into the camera. In a profile of Wall in The New Republic, art critic Jed Perl describes Picture for Women as Wall's signature piece, "since it doubles as a portrait of the late-twentieth-century artist in his studio." Art historian David Campany calls Picture for Women an important early work for Wall as it establishes central themes and motifs found in much of his later work.

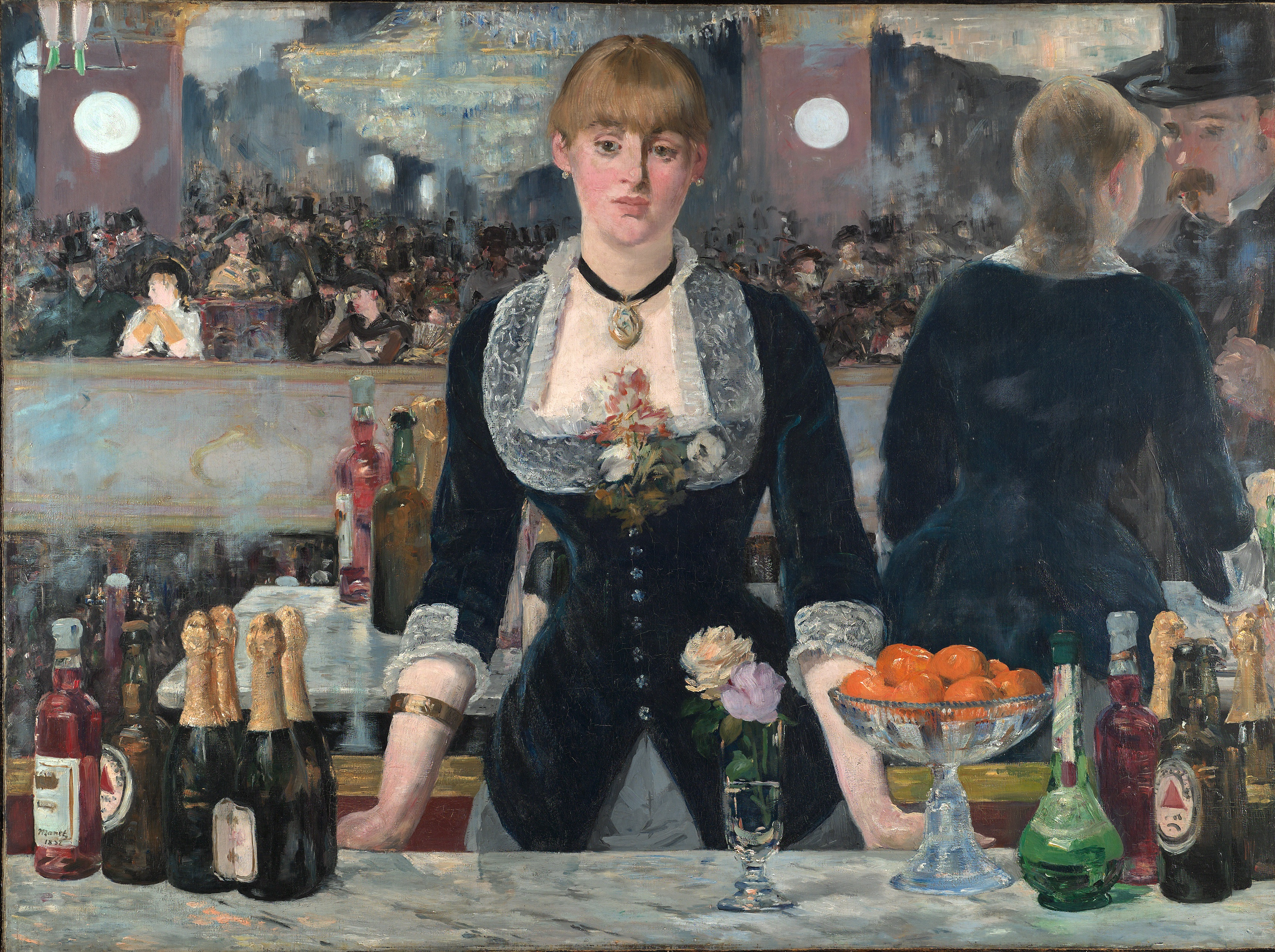
Un bar aux Folies Bergère by Édouard Manet, completed in 1882

A response to Manet's Un bar aux Folies Bergère, the Tate Modern wall text for Picture of Women, from the 2005–2006 exhibition Jeff Wall Photographs 1978–2004, outlines the influence of Manet's painting:

In Manet's painting, a barmaid gazes out of frame, observed by a shadowy male figure. The whole scene appears to be reflected in the mirror behind the bar, creating a complex web of viewpoints. Wall borrows the internal structure of the painting, and motifs such as the light bulbs that give it spatial depth. The figures are similarly reflected in a mirror, and the woman has the absorbed gaze and posture of Manet's barmaid, while the man is the artist himself. Though issues of the male gaze, particularly the power relationship between male artist and female model, and the viewer's role as onlooker, are implicit in Manet's painting, Wall updates the theme by positioning the camera at the centre of the work, so that it captures the act of making the image (the scene reflected in the mirror) and, at the same time, looks straight out at us.

Wall produced one edition of Picture for Women which is in the collection of Centre Georges Pompidou in Paris. There is an artist's proof as well, which is in Wall's personal collection. It was photographed in a borrowed studio in Vancouver in winter 1979 and printed on two separate pieces of film which are joined using clear tape, with the transparency layers overlapping, creating a thin dark seam. The seam passes through the centre of the lens of the depicted camera. The Tate Modern wall text elaborates with a quote from Wall: "The fact that it serves as a reminder of the artifice of picture making is something that Wall has come to appreciate: 'The join between the two pictures brings your eye up to the surface again and creates a dialectic that I always enjoyed and learned from painting ... a dialectic between depth and flatness. Sometimes I hide it, sometimes I don't'."

== Reception ==
Considered a key work in Wall's oeuvre, Picture for Women has attracted much critical attention. In 2011, Picture for Women was the subject of a monographic book by art history David Campany and published as part of Afterall Books' One Work series and has been the subject of critical writing by Donald Kuspit, Catherine David, Asheleigh Moorhouse, Rainer Rochlitz, Thierry de Duve and Stefan Gronert.

== Exhibition history ==
Picture for Women has been exhibited internationally. First shown at Art Gallery of Greater Victoria, Victoria, British Columbia in 1979 in a solo exhibition, other solo exhibitions featuring the work include Hirshhorn Museum and Sculpture Garden, Washington, Museum of Contemporary Art, Los Angeles and Art Tower Mito Japan in 1997, Schaulager, Münchenstein/Basel and Tate Modern, London in 2005. Group exhibitions exhibiting Picture for Women include New York and Ottawa in 1980, Hirshhorn Museum and Sculpture Garden, Washington and Sarah Campbell Blaffer Gallery, University of Houston, Houston in 1981, New Museum of Contemporary Art, New York, Renaissance Society, Chicago and Institute of Contemporary Arts, London in 1984, Musée National d'Art Moderne-Centre Georges Pompidou, Paris in 1987 and 1995.
