= Daina Augaitis =

Canadian curator (born in 1953)

- Born: March 10, 1953 (age 73)
- Education: BES in Honours Geography from the University of Waterloo, Ontario; Curatorial Studies, Emily Carr University of Art and Design, Vancouver, British Columbia; BFA in the Studio Program at Nova Scotia College of Art and Design, Halifax
- Known for: curator of contemporary art
- Awards: Hnatyshyn Prize

Daina Augaitis (born 1953) is a Canadian curator whose work focuses on contemporary art. From 1996 to 2017, she was the chief curator and associate director of the Vancouver Art Gallery in British Columbia.

== Career ==
Augaitis received a BES in Honours Geography from the University of Waterloo, Ontario; then took Curatorial Studies at Emily Carr University of Art and Design, Vancouver, British Columbia and a BFA in the Studio Program at Nova Scotia College of Art and Design, Halifax. In the early 1980s, she worked at the Franklin Furnace in New York (1982); the Convertible Showroom, Vancouver (1984-1986); and the Western Front Society in Vancouver (1983-1986) where in 1986 she co-curated Luminous Sites, a Vancouver-wide project of Canadian video installations. While at The Banff Centre for the Arts, Banff (1986-1995) she activated the Walter Phillips Gallery's publishing program, producing books such as Sound by Artists and Radio Rethink, curated art projects and exhibitions and organized residencies for visual artists and curators.

From 1996 to 2017, she worked at the Vancouver Art Gallery as Chief Curator/ Associate Director, then, when Kathleen Bartels left, served as Interim Director until a new director was appointed in 2020. She is today Chief Curator Emerita at the Vancouver Art Gallery and an Independent Curator.

She created exhibitions showcasing the work of Canadian artists including Rebecca Belmore, Douglas Coupland, Stan Douglas, Brian Jungen, Ian Wallace, Paul Wong, Ben Reeves and international artists Antoni Muntadas, Song Dong and Yang Fudong. In 2014, her exhibition Douglas Coupland: everywhere is anywhere is anything is everything presented the first retrospective of Coupland's visual art. She was awarded the Hnatyshyn Foundation Visual Arts Award in 2014 for curatorial excellence in contemporary art, with that exhibition garnering special mention. Augaitis' 2012 retrospective Muntadas: Entre/Between was exhibited at the Museo Nacional Centro de Arte Reina Sofía, the Gulbenkian Museum, and Jeu de Paume. Augaitis has been a proponent of First Nations art at the Vancouver Art Gallery, organizing exhibitions of both contemporary and historic First Nations art, including Raven Travelling: two centuries of Haida art (2006) and Edenshaw (2012). Her catalogues and essays on these exhibitions have made significant contributions to the scholarship on Canadian indigenous art. She also contributed to the growth of the collection.

== Awards ==
- Emily Award, Emily Carr University of Art and Design, 2000.
- Hnatyshyn Foundation Visual Arts Awards, 2014.
- Alvin Balkind Curator's Prize, 2023;

== Selected bibliography ==
- Douglas, Stan, and Daina Augaitis. 2002. Journey into fear. Vancouver: Vancouver Art Gallery.
- Jungen, Brian, and Daina Augaitis. 2005. Brian Jungen. Vancouver, B.C.: Vancouver Art Gallery.
- Augaitis, Daina. 2006. Raven travelling: two centuries of Haida art. Vancouver: Vancouver Art Gallery.
- Augaitis, Daina, and Kathleen Ritter. 2008. Rebecca Belmore: rising to the occasion. Vancouver: Vancouver Art Gallery.
- Muntadas, and Daina Augaitis. 2011. Muntadas: entre = [Muntadas] : between. Madrid: Museo Nacional Centro de Arte Reina Sofía.
- Wallace, Ian, Daina Augaitis, and Grant Arnold. 2012. Ian Wallace: at the intersection of painting and photography. London: Black Dog Pub.
- Augaitis, Daina, Douglas Coupland, Sara Doris, Bjarke Ingels, and Hans Ulrich Obrist. 2014. Douglas Coupland: everywhere is anywhere is anything is everything; exhibition schedule: Vancouver Art Gallery, May 31 to September 1, 2014; Museum of Contemporary Canadian Art, Toronto, January 30 - April 18, 2015; Royal Ontario Museum, ROM Contemporary Culture, Toronto, January 30 - April 26, 2015. London: Black Dog Publishing.
