= Hnatyshyn Foundation Visual Arts Awards =

Visual arts awards

- Description: Awards recognizing excellence in Canadian visual arts and curating
- Country: Canada
- Presented by: The Hnatyshyn Foundation

The Hnatyshyn Foundation Visual Arts Awards, the Award for Outstanding Achievement as an Artist and the Award for Curatorial Excellence in Contemporary Art are two annual arts awards of $25,000 and $10,000 that recognize mid-career Canadian visual artists and curators. The Hnatyshyn Foundation is a private charity established by Ray Hnatyshyn, Canada's 24th Governor General.

== 2006 ==
It was won by Stan Douglas.

It was juried by Scott Watson, Morris and Helen Belkin Art Gallery, Vancouver; Catherine Crowston, Art Gallery of Alberta, Edmonton; Darlene Coward Wight, Winnipeg Art Gallery; Kitty Scott, National Gallery of Canada, Ottawa; Serpentine Gallery, London (England); Paulette Gagnon, Musée d'art contemporain de Montréal; Robin Metcalfe, Saint Mary's University Art Gallery, Halifax.

== 2007 ==
- Award for Outstanding Achievement as an Artist: Ken Lum
- Award for Curatorial Excellence in Contemporary Art: Louise Déry

It was juried by Jon Tupper, Confederation Centre Art Gallery and Museum, Charlottetown; Christine Ross, Dept. of Art History, McGill University, Montreal; Diana Nemiroff, Carleton University Art Gallery, Ottawa; Robert Enright, arts journalist, Winnipeg; Liz Magor, artist, Vancouver.

== 2008 ==
- Award for Outstanding Achievement as an Artist: Janet Cardiff & George Bures Miller
- Award for Curatorial Excellence in Contemporary Art: Barbara Fischer

It was juried by Christina Ritchie, Contemporary Art Gallery, Vancouver; Jeffrey Spalding, Glenbow Museum, Calgary; Louise Dompierre, Art Gallery of Hamilton; Marc Mayer, Musée d'art contemporain de Montréal; Marlene Creates, Artist, Portugal Cove, Newfoundland.

== 2009 ==
- Award for Outstanding Achievement as an Artist: Rebecca Belmore
- Award for Curatorial Excellence in Contemporary Art: Anthony Kiendl

It was juried by Ian Carr-Harris, artist, writer and educator, Ontario College of Art & Design, Toronto; Peter Dykhuis, Director/Curator, Dalhousie Art Gallery, Halifax; Timothy Long, Head Curator, MacKenzie Art Gallery, Regina; Joan Stebbins, Curator Emerita, Southern Alberta Art Gallery; Gaétane Verna, executive director at Musée d'art de Joliette, QC.

== 2010 ==
- Award for Outstanding Achievement as an Artist: Shary Boyle
- Award for Curatorial Excellence in Contemporary Art: Scott Watson

It was juried by Loise Déry, Lisa Steele and Kim Tomczak, Ken Lum, Jon Tupper.

== 2011 ==
- Award for Outstanding Achievement as an Artist Geoffrey Farmer
- Award for Curatorial Excellence in Contemporary Art: Philip Monk

It was juried by Catherine Crowston, Deputy Director / Chief Curator of the Art Gallery of Alberta; Barbara Fischer, Executive Director/Chief Curator, Justina M. Barnicke Gallery, University of Toronto; Robert Fones, Visual Artist and Writer, Toronto; Angela Grauerholz, Director, Centre de design de l'UQAM, Professor, Artist, Montreal; Scott Watson, Director/Curator of the Morris and Helen Belkin Art Gallery, Vancouver.

== 2012 ==
- Award for Outstanding Achievement as an Artist: Lani Maestro
- Award for Curatorial Excellence in Contemporary Art: Nicole Gingras

It was juried by Robert Enright, contributing editor, Border Crossings magazine, and a research chair in art theory and criticism at the University of Guelph; Michael Fernandes, artist; Peggy Gale, independent curator; Stephen Horne, visiting scholar at the Jarislowsky Institute; Diana Nemiroff, curator and art historian.

== 2013 ==
- Award for Outstanding Achievement as an Artist: Marcel Dzama
- Award for Curatorial Excellence in Contemporary Art: Marie-Josée Jean

It was juried by Eve-Lyne Beaudry, Robert Enright, Peggy Gale, Diana Nemiroff, Nigel Prince.

== 2014 ==
- Award for Outstanding Achievement as an Artist: Kent Monkman
- Award for Curatorial Excellence: Daina Augaitis

It was juried by Lisa Baldissera – Chief Curator, Mendel Gallery; Robert Enright – Cultural journalist, writer and lecturer; Jenifer Papararo – Curator, Contemporary Art Gallery, Vancouver; Eric Walker – Painter and video artist; Sarah Watson – General and artistic director, Artexte.

== 2015 ==
- Award for Outstanding Achievement as an Artist: Pascal Grandmaison
- Award for Curatorial Excellence in Contemporary Art: Candice Hopkins

It was juried by Louise Déry – Director, Galerie de l’UQAM; Dominique Fontaine – Curator and cultural advisor; Anthony Kiendl – Executive Director and CEO, MacKenzie Art Gallery; Lee-Ann Martin – Independent curator; Eric Walker – Senior visual and media artist.

== 2016 ==
- Award for Outstanding Achievement as an Artist: Peter Morin
- Award for Curatorial Excellence in Contemporary Art: Tania Willard

It was juried by Glenn Alteen, David Balzer, Marie-Éve Beaupré, David Garneau, Linda Graif.

== 2018 ==
- Award for Outstanding Achievement as an Artist: Maria Hupfield
- Award for Curatorial Excellence in Contemporary Art: Daina Warren

== 2019 ==
- Award for Outstanding Achievement as an Artist: Dana Claxton
- Award for Curatorial Excellence: Catherine Bédard

== 2020 ==
- Marianne Nicolson
- Emelie Chhangur

== 2021 ==
- Isabelle Hayeur
- Heather Igloliorte

== 2022 ==
- Michelle Jacques
- Hajra Waheed

== 2023 ==
- Bridget Moser
- Sharon Fortney
