= Peter Culley =

Canadian poet and photographer

- Born: 1958
- Died: 2015 (aged 56–57); Nanaimo, Canada
- Occupations: poet, art critic and photographer

Peter Culley (1958–2015) was a Canadian poet and photographer living in Nanaimo at the time of his death. He grew up on Royal Canadian Air Force (RCAF) bases in Ontario, Alberta, Saskatchewan and Scotland and lived in Nanaimo, BC since 1972. He was known for his “Hammertown” series, Hammertown, The Age of Briggs and Stratton, and Parkway, a re-imagination of Nanaimo and British Columbia. He was also an art critic who wrote extensively on Stan Douglas, Roy Arden, Kelly Wood and Geoffrey Farmer. He was involved with many writing scenes, including The Kootenay School of Writing in Vancouver, the Nanaimo poetry scene and poetry circles throughout North America.

== Publications ==
=== Poetry ===
- Twenty-one, Fernie, BC: Oolichan Books, 1980
- Fruit Dots, Vancouver: Tsunami Editions, 1985
- Natural History, Vancouver: Fissure Books, 1986
- The Climax Forest, Vancouver: Leech Books, 1995
- Hammertown, Vancouver: New Star Books, 2003
- The Age of Briggs and Stratton, Vancouver: New Star Books, 2008
- To the Dogs, Vancouver: Arsenal Pulp Press, 2008
- Parkway, Vancouver: New Star Books, 2013
