= Vikky Alexander =

Canadian contemporary artist (born 1959)

- Born: January 30, 1959 (age 67); Victoria, British Columbia, Canada
- Education: Nova Scotia College of Art and Design
- Known for: installation artist, photographer, graphic artist, collagist
- Notable work: Autumn/Spring, 1997
- Movement: Vancouver School
- Awards: Royal Canadian Academy, Canada Council for the Arts

Vikky Alexander RCA (born January 30, 1959) is a Canadian contemporary artist who now lives in Montreal. She is a member of the Vancouver School and was a Professor of photography in the Visual Arts Department at the University of Victoria in Canada. She has retired from teaching and now holds the title professor emerita.

She has exhibited internationally since 1981 as a practitioner in the field of photo-conceptualism, and as an installation artist who uses photography, drawing, and collage. Her themes include the appropriated image, and the deceptions of nature and space. Her artworks include mirrors, photographic landscape murals, postcards, video and photography. She is part of the Pictures Generation.

== Background ==
Alexander was born in Victoria, British Columbia, Canada and is a graduate of the Nova Scotia College of Art and Design from which she received her Bachelor of Fine Arts in 1979.

== Work ==
Alexander is known for her large scale photo-mural installations and multimedia art that combine photography with sculptural objects. These works foreground a strong interest in the history of architecture, the fields of design and fashion supported by the production of drawing and collage. Alexander's use of modernist architecture and industrial design have explored issues of artifice and representation. Her early work informed the movement of Appropriation art in the early 1980s for which she is historically recognized as the youngest innovator of the tendency alongside Richard Prince, Louise Lawler, Barbara Kruger and Sherrie Levine.

Alexander has continued to explore the tensions between nature and culture in her recent work. Recent projects have considered the lifestyle fantasies facilitated by consumerism, as well as the intersections of beauty and artifice.

== Selected exhibitions ==
Alexander has exhibited nationally and internationally in solo exhibitions including "CEPA", Buffalo 1983, New Museum, New York City 1985, Kunsthalle Bern, Bern 1990, Vancouver Art Gallery, Vancouver 1992 and 2019, Ansel Adams Center, San Francisco 1992, Mercer Union, Toronto 1993, Presentation House Gallery, Vancouver 1996, Art Gallery of Windsor, Windsor 1998, Contemporary Art Gallery, Vancouver 1999, Catriona Jeffries Gallery, Vancouver, National Gallery of Canada, Ottawa 2000, State Gallery, Vancouver 2004, Trepanier Baer Gallery, Calgary 2009, Massey University, Wellington 2010. She has participated in numerous group exhibitions: Whitney Museum of American Art, New York, Dia Art Foundation, New York, Yokohama Civic Art Gallery, Yokohama, Barbican Art Gallery, London, Taipei Fine Arts Museum, Taipei, Seattle Art Museum, Seattle and in 2021, her work was included with Edward Burtynsky, Jane Buyers and others in Making Space at the Art Gallery of Nova Scotia, Halifax. In 2024, a solo show of her work titled Vikky Alexander, Dream Palace, was exhibited at the Galerie Allen in Paris, France.

She was also included in the comprehensive exhibition Intertidal of Vancouver School artists held at MuHKA in Antwerp in 2004. This exhibition was influential in two prominent art movements, one in New York, N.Y. (USA) and the other in Vancouver, B.C. (CAN); an earlier body of her work emerged from Appropriation Art while her later artworks deepened the language of Photo-conceptualism, which was part of a photography group known internationally as the Vancouver School.

== Selected public collections ==
Institutional collections of her work can be found in the Los Angeles Museum of Contemporary Art, the International Center of Photography in New York City, the National Gallery of Canada in Ottawa, and at the Deste Foundation, Athens. Alexander is represented by Trépanier Baer Gallery, Calgary, Wilding Cran, Los Angeles, Cooper Cole, Toronto, and Downs & Ross, New York.

== Press ==
The Vancouver School artist and writer, Ian Wallace relates her work to

"an expression of the imaginary, wherein fantasies of hope and utopia are acted out in the daydreams that call reality into question. These are collective fantasies and are linked to popular taste for images that transcend the everyday. The images of extreme beauty, which are ubiquitous in commodity culture, function as a cult of escape from the everyday. While the aspiration of much conceptual art has been to present critical images that contradict and shatter these fantasies with the force of reality, Vikky Alexander’s work projects the raw indulgence that exists on the inside of these fantasies, heightening our apprehension and anxieties of them from within."

Conceptual artist and critic Dan Graham has remarked on the context of design in her work and its relationship to audiences in the 1980s.

"Two-dimensional design can be used to reflect corporate identity, social/political identity and individual identity. Examples of graphic markers of individual identity (which often serve to correlate that identity to corporate or social/political interests) are personalized T-shirts, personal stationery and business cards, greeting cards and the like. (T-shirts imprinted with logotypes are a good example of either corporate or social identities being used by individuals as a sign of individual identity.) These "personal" items mark an "individual" identity that is socially prescribed by convention and commercial systems of exchange. Recently, Alexander with Louise Lawler, Kim Gordon, Michael Asher have designed cards, interiors and matches for individual clients. These "products" are neither part of commercial mass production nor designed for gallery exhibition and sale as art objects. They set up a peculiar and ambivalent relation between artist and client . . . Thus the kind of designer-client relationship that is constructed inherently questions values of both "design" and art receivership, in psychological as well as social/esthetic terms."

The American curator, Dan Cameron wrote in a review of her large scale installation work titled Lake in the Woods from 1986:

Vikky Alexander's narrow gallery environment consisting of an idyllic photo-mural diptych, which faces a large prefabricated wall unit, this in turn supporting a row of mirror panels at shoulder height. Only by standing at either end of the room could one take in the entire piece: nature as decorative artifice, figment of a universally synthetic consciousness.

== Publications ==
- Alexander, Vikky, and Ian Wallace. Vikky Alexander: Vaux-le-Vicomte Panorama. Vancouver: Contemporary Art Gallery, 1999.
- Alexander, Vikky. Vikky Alexander: Lake in the Woods. Vancouver: Vancouver Art Gallery, 1992.
- Alexander, Vikky. Beneath the Paving Stones. Vancouver: Charles H. Scott Gallery, 1994.
- Augaitis, Daina. Reconnaissance: Three Panoramic Views: Vikky Alexander, Ray Arden, Jamelie Hassan. Banff: Walter Phillips Gallery, 1987.
- Cameron, Dan. "Post Feminism". Flash Art. February/March 1987.
- Ferguson, Bruce W., and Gary Dufour. Pastfuturetense: Vikky Alexander, Kari Cavén, Ronald Jones, Rui Sanches, Erwin Wurn, Klaus Von Bruch, David Diao, Jac Leirner, Barbara Todd. Winnipeg: Winnipeg Art Gallery, 1990.
- Ferguson, Bruce W. Vikky Alexander: Glass Sculpture. Bern: Kunsthalle Bern, 1990.
- Graham, Dan. "Signs." Artforum. April 1981
- Hagen, Charles. "Commodity Image." New York Times. 1993.
- Linker, Kate. "Review." Artforum. March 1985.
- O'Brien, Melanie, and Vikky Alexander. Vikky Alexander. Vancouver, B.C.: Catriona Jeffries Gallery, 2000.
- Solomon-Godeau, Abigail. Photography at the Dock: Essays on Photographic History, Institutions, and Practices. Media & society, 4. Minneapolis: University of Minnesota Press, 1991.
- Wallis, Brian. Vikky Alexander. Calgary: Stride Gallery, 1989.
- Watson, Scott, and Dieter Roelstraete. Intertidal: Vancouver Art & Artists. Vancouver: Morris and Helen Belkin Art Gallery, 2005.
