= Martin Honert =

German artist based in Düsseldorf (born 1953)

Martin Honert, Photo, 1993, epoxy, wood, and paint, 31 x 29 x 48 inches, Museum fur Moderne Kunst, Frankfurt am Main.

Martin Honert (born 1953) is a German artist based in Düsseldorf. He is known for making veristic sculptures of memories or images related to his childhood.

== Work ==
Honert was born in Bottrop, West Germany and attended the Staatliche Kunstakademie Düsseldorf from 1981 to 1988, taking his master class with Fritz Schwegler in 1985. Many of his sculptures recall the readymades of Marcel Duchamp, often changing their scale. Drawings the artist made as a child of Santa Claus were transformed into a life-sized sculpture for his 2004 show at Matthew Marks (Catalogue Raisonné no. 43). Unlike most artists that invoke the readymade tradition, with the notable exception of Robert Gober, Honert actually fabricates all of his works from scratch by himself, which also accounts for the artist's small output.

His early sculptures like Red Upholstered Chair and Table with Jell-O (both 1983) (Catalogue Raisonné nos. 4 & 5) are highly realistic handmade sculptures based on drawings Honert made of his time spent in boarding school in Westphalia. Both pieces appear as the ordinary objects their titles describe: a red upholstered chair and a table with a plate of real Jell-O resting on top of it. Yet, the artist also installed neon tube lights into the backrest and seat of the chair to make the upholstery glow, and a motor hidden in the table causes the Jell-O to tremble. Furthermore, "Table with Jell-O is the usual height of a table, but in its other dimensions it departs from the usual sizes, seeming too large for one person but too small for two or four." The luminous chair and jiggling Jell-O introduce the element of memory into the works. We are not simply seeing objects in the present, instead the lighting of the chair, for example, locates the chair under specific lighting conditions, at a certain time. But when and where these particulars refer to remain unclear, calling into question where the truth in memory resides: is it in memory's attachment to historical objects or lived experiences; or, is lodged in the process of remembering itself?

In recent years, Honert's art has verged on installation. A Model Scenario of the Flying Classroom (Catalogue Raisonné no. 30) made for the German Pavilion at the 1995 Venice Biennale borrows its subject and title from a children's book by Erich Kästner entitled The Flying Classroom. It telescopes the entire plot of one scene from the novel in which Kästner describes a rehearsal for a play that the characters put together. Despite the description's length and detail, the reader learns little about the play's content or actual performance. Honert's art again finds itself trying to represent what is specific—the detailed description of the play's rehearsal—but nonetheless vague—the little information gained about the play's particulars.

== Selected exhibitions ==
1992

- Biennale of Sydney, Sydney, Australia

1994

- Ecole nationale des beaux-arts de Bourges, France

1995

- Venice Biennale

1996

- Martin Honert, Collier Schorr, Tom Gidley, Entwistle Gallery, London
- Views from Abroad: European Perspectives on American Art 2, Whitney Museum of American Art, New York
- Fliegende Klassenzimmer (The Flying Classroom), Arnolfini Gallery, Bristol

1997

- Young German Artists 2, Saatchi Gallery, London
- Pro Lidice: 52 Artists from Germany, The Czech Museum of Fine Arts, Prague
- Fata Morgana, Museu d'Art Contemporani de Barcelona

1999

- Museum of Fine Arts, Centre de Cultura Contemporània de Barcelona, Palazzo Grassi, Venice

2000

- Interventions, Milwaukee Art Museum

2001

- Tenth Anniversary Exhibition: 100 Drawings and Photographs, Matthew Marks Gallery, New York

2005

- Elements of Nature, La Cité de l'énergie, Shawinigan, Québec

2007

- Summer Exhibition 2007, Royal Academy of Arts, London
- Staatliche Kunstsammlungen Dresden

== Publications ==
- Amman, Jean-Christophe. Martin Honert. Frankfurt: Museum für Moderne Kunst,
- Honert, Martin. Ein szenisches Modell des “Fliegenden Klassenzimmers” nach der Erzählung von Erich Kästner. Ostfildern, Cantz Verlag, 1995.
- Osterwald, Tilman. Martin Honert. Bonn: Institute für Auslandsbeziehungen, Autoren, Photographen und VG Bild-Kunst, 1998.
- Honert, Martin. Catalogue Raisonné. Cologne: Verlag der Buchhandlung Walther König, 2004.
- Honert, Martin, Kathleen S. Bartels and Jeff Wall. Martin Honert.Vancouver: Vancouver Art Gallery, 2013.

== General references ==
- Art in Review: Martin Honert, New York Times, October 19, 2007, sec. E
- Groys, Boris. Mind's Eye Views. Artforum, February 1995, 52–61.
- Kazakina, Katya. German Artists’ Big Bearded Hikers, Poetic Palaces: Chelsea Art
- Pym, William. Martin Honert. Artforum, October 6, 2007, www.artforum.com.
- Stals, José Lebrero. Martin Honert: Out of the Deadpan. Flash Art, April 1993, 88–89.
- Boucher, Brian. Martin Honert at Matthew Marks. Art in America, February 2008, 140–141.
