= N.E. Thing Co. =

Canadian art collective

N.E. Thing Co. (Iain and Ingrid Baxter)
- Iain, Erian and Ingrid Baxter.
- Notable work: Conceptual works created in a commercial format.

N.E. Thing Co. was a Canadian art collective created by married artists Iain and Ingrid Baxter to operate in a commercial-like format for producing work from 1967 to 1978. It was based in Vancouver, British Columbia.

Seminal figures in the emergence of conceptual art movement in Canada during the late sixties, N.E. Thing Co. used corporate strategies to generate and frame its artistic practice.

== History ==
Founded in 1966 by Iain and Ingrid Baxter, N.E. Thing Co. was established as a conceptual vehicle that viewed the art world as "parallel [to] consumer culture." N.E. Thing Co. was incorporated under the Companies Act in 1969. The Baxters named themselves co-presidents of the company and used a gold corporate seal as the group's signature.

Focusing on an interdisciplinary practice and using photography, site-specific performances, and installation, N.E. Thing Co. is seen as a "key catalyst and influence for Vancouver photoconceptualism" and is considered a precursor to the Vancouver School.

N.E. Thing Co. were influenced by the ideas of Canadian communications theorist Marshall MacLuhan. The pair created some of the earliest photoconceptual works that used photography to document "idea-works and their sites, as language games and thematic inventories and as reflective investigations of the social and architectural landscape." Their innovative approach to creating landscape works involved tactics such as placing mirrors in the river near their home and combining photos taken at different angles and distances, which resulted in works such as Reflected Landscape, 1968.

N.E. Thing Co. disbanded in 1978 when Iain and Ingrid ended their relationship.

== Bibliography ==
- Bassnett, Sarah; Parsons, Sarah. Photography in Canada, 1839–1989: An Illustrated History. Toronto: Art Canada Institute, 2023. ISBN 978-1-4871-0309-5
- Baxter, Iain and Ingrid Baxter. You Are Now in the Middle of a N.E. Thing Co. Landscape: Works by Iain and Ingrid Baxter, 1965-1971. Vancouver: The Gallery, 1993. ISBN 0-88865-296-8
- Mewburn, Charity. Sixteen Hundred Miles North of Denver. Vancouver: Morris and Helen Belkin Art Gallery, 1999. ISBN 0-88865-606-8
- National Film Board of Canada. B.C. Almanac(h) C-B. Vancouver: Presentation House Gallery, Reprint edition, 2015. ISBN 978-0-920293-97-3 OCLC 1031772338
