= A Fight on the Sidewalk =

Photograph by Jeff Wall

A Fight on the Sidewalk is a color photograph created by Canadian photographer Jeff Wall, in 1994. It is a staged photograph depicting an urban fight scene, exhibited in a lightbox.

== Description ==
The work demonstrates the usual characteristics of Wall's cinematographic photography, inspired by street photography and the neorealist cinema. The picture, which was staged in a studio in Vancouver in the winter of 1994, with three actors, depicts a scene of urban violence, taking place at night, where two young men are fighting violently on the floor of a sidewalk, while a third person watches them without intervening. The background of the scene is the grey wall of an anonymous building. showing graffiti that has been scratched. To the left is what appears to be the entrance of a garage. The reasons of the fight are left unknown for the viewers. The faces of the youngsters who are involved are not seen and its uncertain if the hooded man, dressed in black, who is watching them is just an unrelated observer. Its also intriguing the fact that the graffitis of the wall were scratched to the point that its impossible to read what was originally there.

== Public collections ==
There are prints of this photograph at the Barcelona Museum of Contemporary Art and at the Pinakothek der Moderne, in Munich.
