= Iain Baxter& =

Canadian artist

IAIN BAXTER&
- Born: Iain Baxter; November 16, 1936 (age 89); Middlesbrough, England
- Known for: Conceptual artist, photographer
- Movement: Conceptual art
- Awards: Officer of the Order of Canada (2003); Companion of the Order of Canada (2019); Member of the Order of British Columbia (2007)

IAIN BAXTER& CC OOnt OBC RCA FRSC (born Iain Baxter on November 16, 1936) is a Canadian conceptual artist. BAXTER& is recognized internationally as an early practitioner of conceptual art; the Canada Council Molson Prize committee stated in 2005 that his "highly regarded conceptual installations and projects, as well as his photography, have earned him the label of 'the Marshall McLuhan of the visual arts." BAXTER& was co-president with Ingrid Baxter of the conceptual project and legally incorporated business N.E. Thing Co., founded in 1966. BAXTER& is Professor Emeritus at the School of Visual Arts University of Windsor and a member of the Royal Canadian Academy of Arts.

== Early life ==
BAXTER& was born in Middlesbrough, England in 1936; his family emigrated to Canada in 1937 and settled in Calgary. In 1959, he received a BSc from the University of Idaho and completed a Master of Education at the University of Idaho. BAXTER& studied art and aesthetics in Japan in 1961 and completed an MFA at Washington State University at Pullman in 1964.

== N.E. Thing Co. ==
Founded in 1966 by IAIN and Ingrid Baxter, N.E. Thing Co. was established as a conceptual vehicle that viewed the art world as "parallel [to] consumer culture." N.E. Thing Co. was incorporated under the Companies Act in 1969. Focusing on an interdisciplinary practice and using photography, site-specific performances and installation, N.E. Thing Co. is seen as a "key catalyst and influence for Vancouver photoconceptualism" and is considered a precursor to the Vancouver School. N.E. Thing Co. created some of the earliest photoconceptual works to display a tendency to use photography to document "idea-works and their sites, as language games and thematic inventories and as reflective investigations of the social and architectural landscape."

In 1969, N.E. Thing Company Ltd. produced 'Reflected Landscape: The Arctic Sun' as 35 mm slides, lithograph and transparencies. The image, which is now in a private collection, was taken in Inuvik with a mirror reflecting the Arctic sun on the arctic tundra.

N.E. Thing Co. disbanded in 1978 when Iain and Ingrid ended their relationship.

== Name change ==
In 2005, Iain Baxter legally changed his name to IAIN BAXTER& (pronounced Baxter-and), in part to reflect his fascination for the ampersand as a typographic mark but also to reflect what he values in a "non-authorial take on art production... an unending collaboration with the viewer and the means to question the artist's role." He has created a series of sculptural works utilizing the ampersand, including And, a 10-foot inflatable silver version in 2008.

== Awards ==
- 1978: Victor Martyn Lynch-Staunton Award
- 2003: Officer of the Order of Canada
- 2004: Governor General's Award in Visual and Media Arts,
- 2004: Member of the Order of Ontario.
- 2005: Canada Council for the Arts Molson Prize
- 2006: Gershon Iskowitz Prize at the Art Gallery of Ontario.
- 2007: Member of the Order of British Columbia.
- 2013: Fellow of the Royal Society of Canada
- 2019: Companion of the Order of Canada
