= After (art) =

Convention for titles of copied artworks

After is an art convention used in the titles and inscriptions of artworks to credit the original artist in the title of the copy. Often the title of the original work is retained, for example an interpretation by Rembrandt of Leonardo's The Last Supper becomes The Last Supper, after Leonardo da Vinci. The addendum, sometimes termed an attribution qualifier, may be used by the artist making the copy or a later curator or academic and features in the linked records that make up the Cultural Objects Name Authority. The term may be used regardless of how similar the two works appear. Curators have sometimes referred to the resulting imitation works as "after-[original artist's name]s", with works inspired by Albrecht Dürer being after-Dürers. In some instances, artists have signed works made after the manner of their own indicating their approval of the copy.

== Notable examples ==
Notable examples of the convention in use
Title	Artist	Date	Medium	Title (based on)	Artist (based on)	Date (based on)	Medium (based on)	Ref
The Last Supper, after Leonardo da Vinci	Rembrandt	1634–1635	red chalk	The Last Supper	Leonardo da Vinci	c. 1495 – c. 1498	mural	
Tall Bamboo and Distant Mountains, after Wang Meng	Wang Hui	1694	ink wash painting	Tall Bamboo and Distant Mountains	Wang Meng	c. 1309 – c. 1385	ink wash painting	
Christ on the Cross after Rubens	Edwin Landseer	1840	trois crayons	Christ on the Cross	Peter Paul Rubens	1619–1620	oil on canvas	
The Abduction of the Sabine Women (after Poussin)	Edgar Degas	1861–1862	oil on canvas	L'enlèvement des Sabines	Nicolas Poussin	1637–1638	oil on canvas	
Still Life with a Sketch after Delacroix	Paul Gauguin	1887	oil on canvas	The Expulsion of Adam and Eve from Paradise	Eugène Delacroix	c. 1838 – c. 1847	oil on paper	
First Steps (after Millet)	Vincent van Gogh	1890	oil on canvas	First Steps	Jean-François Millet	c. 1859 – c. 1866	chalk and pastel on paper	
Study after Velázquez's Portrait of Pope Innocent X	Francis Bacon	1953	oil on canvas	Retrato de Inocencio X	Diego Velázquez	c. 1650	oil on canvas	
Luncheon on the Grass, after Manet	Pablo Picasso	1962	linoleum cut	Le Déjeuner sur l'herbe	Édouard Manet	1863	oil on canvas	
After Walker Evans: 4	Sherrie Levine	1981	photograph	Alabama Tenant Farmer Wife (Allie Mae Burroughs)	Walker Evans	1936	photograph	
Las Meninas (Self-Portrait after Velázquez)	Joel-Peter Witkin	1987	photograph	Las Meninas	Diego Velázquez	1656	oil on canvas	
A Sudden Gust of Wind (after Hokusai)	Jeff Wall	1993	Cibachrome photograph	Ejiri in Suruga Province (Travellers caught in a sudden breeze at Ejiri)	Hokusai	c. 1830 – c. 1832	woodblock print	

== See also ==
- Homage (arts)
- Appropriation (art)
- Imitation (art)
