= Buyers (disambiguation) =

Buyers is the plural of a term used to describe someone who undertakes procurement on behalf of an organization.

Buyers may also refer to:

== People with the surname Buyers ==
- Jane Buyers (born 1948), Canadian multimedia artist
- John Buyers, British sailor circa 1800
- John W. A. "Doc" Buyers (1928-2006), American CEO of C. Brewer & Co.

== See also ==
- Buyer (disambiguation)
