= Kelly Wood (artist) =

Canadian artist and photographer

- Born: 1962 (age 62–63); Toronto, Ontario, Canada
- Education: University of British Columbia, MFA; Emily Carr University of Art and Design
- Known for: Photography
- Notable work: The Continuous Garbage Project: 1998–2003

Kelly Wood (born 1962) is a Canadian visual artist and photographer from Toronto, Ontario. Wood’s artistic practice is primarily based in Vancouver, B.C. and London, Ontario.

== Education ==
Wood obtained a diploma from Emily Carr University of Art and Design in 1988 and an M.F.A. from the University of British Columbia in 1996. While studying at the University of British Columbia, Wood was advised by Vancouver School artists Jeff Wall and Ian Wallace.

== Career ==
Wood’s practice primarily focuses on photography from a feminist perspective and has been regarded for her vibrant "photographic maneuvers." In 1996, Wood had her first solo commercial exhibition at Catriona Jeffries Gallery.

Wood has been recognized for her exhibition the Continuous Garbage Project: 1998–2003, exhibited at the Morris and Helen Belkin Art Gallery and Catriona Jeffries Gallery. The project included photographs of transparent garbage bags taken over the course of five years. Through the exhibition, Wood explored labour, craft, and photography, with photographs "reminiscent of Man Ray’s photographs of the ‘dust breeding.’" Wood has written articles for Border Crossings, including a review of Stan Douglas’ work entitled "Still Supplementation: Stan Douglas’s Cuba Photographs." Wood is currently a professor at Western University in London, Ontario.

=== Artistic collaborations ===
In 2008, Wood collaborated with Polish artist Monika Grzymala on a site specific installation at Catriona Jefferies Gallery. The exhibition combined Gryzmala’s digital background with Wood’s photography to create an installation titled Binary Sound System. In 2013, Wood worked with Canadian artist Kelly Jazvac at Diaz Contemporary Gallery in Toronto on an exhibition titled, "Impel with Puffs." The exhibition combined Wood’s photographic work with Jazvac’s "salvaged vinyl [sculptures]." Wood has also exhibited with artists Myfanwy Macleod, Ron Terada, and Yoko Takashima.

=== Selected exhibitions ===
- 2010 – Vancouver Art Gallery, Everything Everyday, Vancouver, BC
- 2008 – Catriona Jeffries Gallery, Kelly Wood / Monika Grzymala (curated by Jessie Caryl), Vancouver, British Columbia
- 2003 – Morris and Helen Art Belkin Gallery, The Continuous Garbage Project: 1998 – 2003, Vancouver, British Columbia
- 1999 – Art Gallery of Ontario, Waste Management, (curated by Christina Ritchie), Toronto, Ontario
- 1991 – Front Gallery, LURCH, Vancouver, British Columbia

=== Public collections ===
- Museum London, London, ON
- McIntosh Gallery, Western University, London, ON
- Vancouver Art Gallery, Vancouver, BC
- Art Gallery of Ontario, Toronto, ON
- Canadian Museum of Contemporary Photography, Ottawa, ON
- Museum of Contemporary Canadian Art, Toronto, ON
- The Canada Council Art Bank, Ottawa, ON

== Awards ==
In 2003 Wood won the annual Shadbolt Foundation VIVA Award, alongside artist Geoffrey Farmer.
