= A Bar at the Folies-Bergère =

Painting by Édouard Manet, considered his last major work - 1882

- Un bar aux Folies Bergère (French)
- Artist: Édouard Manet
- Year: 1882
- Medium: Oil on canvas
- Dimensions: 96 cm × 130 cm (37.8 in × 51.2 in)
- Location: Courtauld Gallery, London

A Bar at the Folies-Bergère (French: Un bar aux Folies Bergère) is a painting by Édouard Manet, considered to be his last major work. It was painted in 1882 and exhibited at the Paris Salon of that year. It depicts a scene in the Folies Bergère nightclub in Paris. The painting originally belonged to the composer Emmanuel Chabrier, a close friend of Manet, and hung over his piano. It is now in the Courtauld Gallery in London.

== Analysis ==
=== Description ===
The central figure stands before a mirror, although critics—accusing Manet of ignorance of perspective and alleging various impossibilities in the painting—have debated this point since the earliest reviews were published. In 2000, however, art historian Malcolm Park proved the perspective was physically possible by staging a reconstruction shown to reproduce the scene as painted by Manet.

According to this reconstruction, "the conversation that many have assumed was transpiring between the barmaid and gentleman is revealed to be an optical trick—the man stands outside the painter's field of vision, to the left, and looks away from the barmaid, rather than standing right in front of her." As it appears, the observer should be standing to the right and closer to the bar than the man whose reflection appears at the right edge of the picture. This is an unusual departure from the central point of view usually assumed when viewing pictures drawn according to perspective.

=== Interpretation and iconography ===
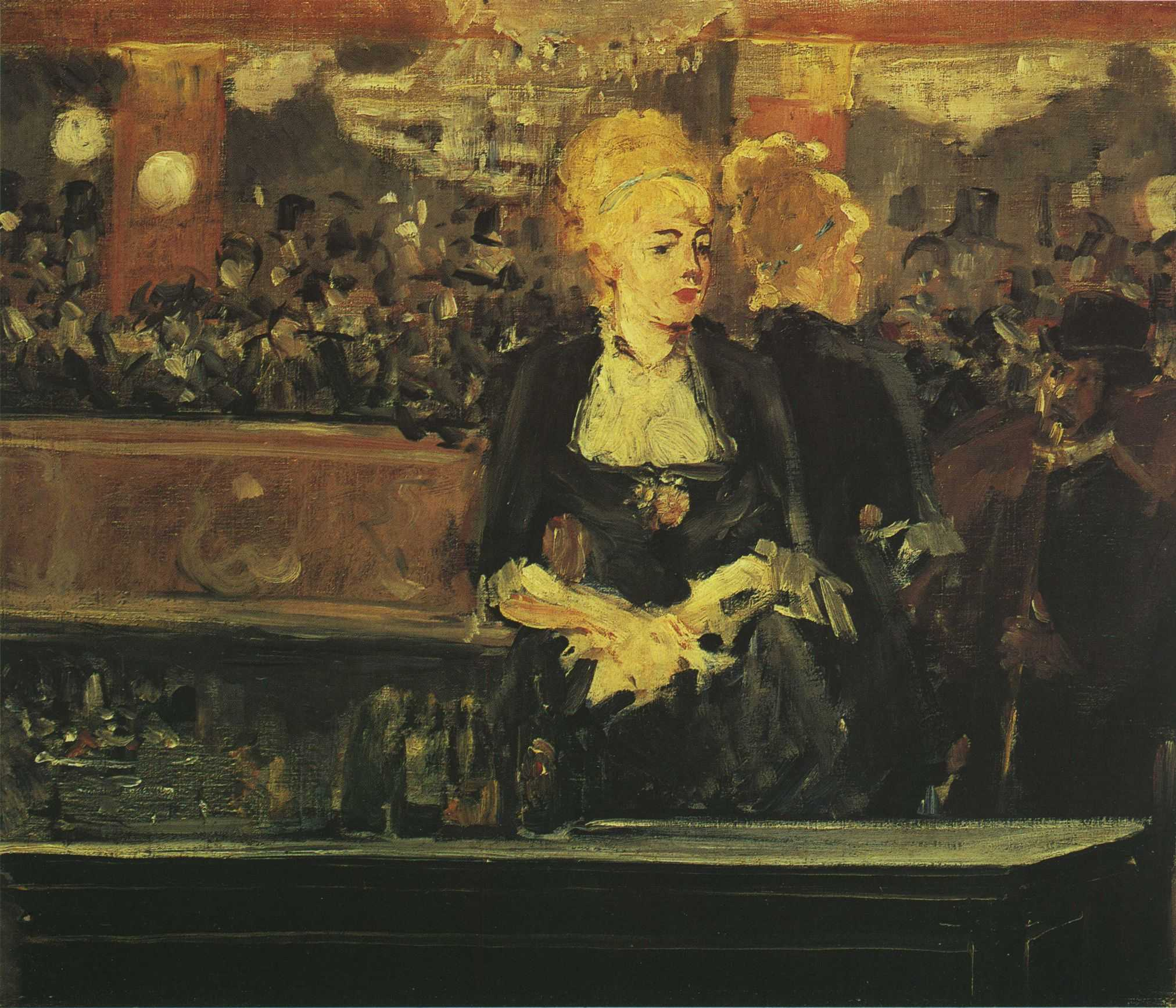
Study for A Bar at the Folies-Bergère (1881)

The painting exemplifies Manet's commitment to realism in its detailed representation of a contemporary scene. Many features have puzzled critics but almost all of them have been shown to have a rationale, and the painting has been the subject of numerous popular and scholarly articles. Asserting the presence of the mirror has been crucial for many modern interpreters. It provides a meaningful parallel with Las Meninas, a masterpiece by an artist Manet admired, Diego Velázquez. There has been a considerable development of this topic since Michel Foucault broached it in his book The Order of Things (1966).

The art historian Jeffrey Meyers describes the intentional play on perspective and the apparent violation of the operations of mirrors: "Behind her, and extending for the entire length of the four-and-a-quarter-foot painting, is the gold frame of an enormous mirror. The French philosopher Maurice Merleau-Ponty has called a mirror 'the instrument of a universal magic that changes things into spectacles, spectacles into things, me into others, and others into me.' We, the viewers, stand opposite the barmaid on the other side of the counter and, looking at the reflection in the mirror, see exactly what she sees... A critic has noted that Manet's 'preliminary study shows her placed off to the right, whereas in the finished canvas she is very much the centre of attention.' Though Manet shifted her from the right to the center, he kept her reflection on the right. Seen in the mirror, she seems engaged with a customer; in full face, she's self-protectively withdrawn and remote."

The painting is rich in details which provide clues to social class and milieu. The woman at the bar is a real person, known as Suzon, who worked at the Folies-Bergère in the early 1880s. For his painting, Manet posed her in his studio. By including a dish of oranges in the foreground, Manet identifies the barmaid as a prostitute, according to art historian Larry L. Ligo, who says that Manet habitually associated oranges with prostitution in his paintings. T. J. Clark says that the barmaid is "intended to represent one of the prostitutes for which the Folies-Bergère was well-known", who is represented "as both a salesperson and a commodity—something to be purchased along with a drink."

Other notable details include the pair of green feet in the upper left-hand corner, which belong to a trapeze artist who is performing above the restaurant's patrons. The beer bottles depicted are easily identified by the red triangle on the label as Bass Pale Ale, and the conspicuous presence of this British brand instead of German beer has been interpreted as documentation of anti-German sentiment in France in the decade after the Franco-Prussian War.

== Cultural influence ==
The 1934 ballet Bar aux Folies-Bergère with choreography by Ninette de Valois and music of Chabrier was created from, and based around, Manet's painting. The painting The Bar (1954) by Australian artist John Brack, which depicts a comparatively grim and austere Melbourne bar-room scene, is an ironic reference to A Bar at the Folies-Bergère. In the 1988 Eddie Murphy film Coming to America, a spoof on the painting in which the barmaids are dark-skinned women in red dresses and there is a hamburger on a plate on the counter can be seen hanging at the McDowell residence.

Canadian artist Jeff Wall makes reference to A Bar at the Folies-Bergère in his work Picture for Women (1979). The Tate Modern wall text for Picture for Women, from the 2005–2006 exhibition Jeff Wall Photographs 1978–2004, outlines the influence of Manet's painting:

In Manet's painting, a barmaid gazes out of frame, observed by a shadowy male figure. The whole scene appears to be reflected in the mirror behind the bar, creating a complex web of viewpoints. Wall borrows the internal structure of the painting, and motifs such as the light bulbs that give it spatial depth. The figures are similarly reflected in a mirror, and the woman has the absorbed gaze and posture of Manet's barmaid, while the man is the artist himself. Though issues of the male gaze, particularly the power relationship between male artist and female model, and the viewer's role as onlooker, are implicit in Manet's painting, Wall updates the theme by positioning the camera at the centre of the work, so that it captures the act of making the image (the scene reflected in the mirror) and, at the same time, looks straight out at us.

== See also ==
- List of paintings by Édouard Manet
- 1882 in art

== References and sources ==
Sources

- Gary Tinterow, et al. Manet/Velázquez: The French Taste for Spanish Painting, Metropolitan Museum of Art, 2003.
