= Buyer (disambiguation) =

A buyer is someone engaged in purchasing assets. The term may also refer to:

- Buyer (fashion)
- Franklin Pierce Buyer (1878–1963), traveling salesman and city counsellor
- Steve Buyer (born 1958), former US Congressman from Indiana

== See also ==
- Buyers (disambiguation)
