= Kelly Lycan =

Canadian artist

Kelly Lycan is an installation and photo-based visual artist who lives and works in Vancouver, British Columbia.

== Life ==
Lycan studied Photography at Ryerson University in Toronto, Ontario (then Ryerson Polytechnical University), completed her BFA at the Nova Scotia College of Art and Design in Halifax in 1995, and completed her MFA at the University of Santa Barbara in California in 1998. As a solo artist she has exhibited at galleries across Canada and the United States including Presentation House Gallery, Plug In, Institute of Contemporary Art, and Mercer Union. As a member of the service based artist collective Instant Coffee, she has exhibited at The America's Society; Vancouver Art Gallery; Incheon Art Platform, South Korea; Yerba Buena Center, San Francisco; and the Art Gallery of Ontario.

== Artistic practice ==
Lycan's installation and photo-based practice explores the ways in which images and objects exist in the world, and "the way objects are valued, devalued, and revalued, dependent upon their place of display", Interested in the discrepancies between experience and reproduction, Lycan often re-purposes and re-contextualizes ordinary things, referencing the collections and methods of display found in museums, gift shops, and department stores. For example, for her 2014 exhibition Underglow at Presentation House Gallery, Lycan recreated the interior of the New York avant-garde art gallery 291 based on photographs taken by founder Alfred Stieglitz in 1906. Her dual employment of photography and sculpture suggests a fluid relationship between the specifics of each medium. Her work has been described as "funny, critical, and ironic all at once."

== Selected exhibitions ==
- White Hot, Gallery TPW, 2009
- Bronze Tinfoil Ball, OR Gallery, 2011
- Autobiography for No One, Simon Fraser University Gallery, 2014
- Underglow, Presentation House Gallery, 2014
- Ideas and Things, Kamloops Art Gallery, 2015
- Superimposition: Sculpture and Image, Plug In, Institute of Contemporary Art, 2016
- More Than Nothing, Burrard Art Foundation, 2016

== Awards ==
In 2016, Lycan won the VIVA Award from the Jack and Doris Shadbolt Foundation for the Visual Arts, an award given to mid-career BC artists. She was also the recipient of the City of Vancouver Live-Work Studio from 2012 to 2015, a competitive award that offers highly regarded Vancouver-based artists low-cost live-work studios for a period of three years in support of their artistic practice.
