= A Sudden Gust of Wind (after Hokusai) =

Photograph by Jeff Wall

Jeff Wall A Sudden Gust of Wind (after Hokusai), 1993

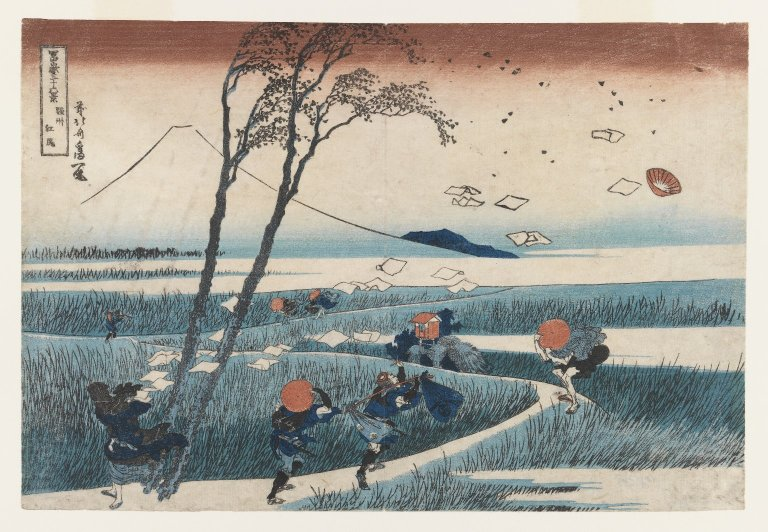
Katsushika Hokusai Yejiri Station, Province of Suruga, c. 1832

A Sudden Gust of Wind (after Hokusai) is a color photograph made by Jeff Wall in 1993. The large photograph is a rework version of the woodcut Yejiri Station, Province of Suruga (c. 1832) by Japanese artist Katsushika Hokusai. The picture is displayed in a light box and it has the dimensions of 250 by 397 cm. It belongs to the collection of the Tate Modern, in London.

== Description and analysis ==
Wall worked on this photograph for five months. It involved five actors and it was shot in a landscape near Vancouver, British Columbia, when the appropriate weather conditions were in effect. He modified and collaged elements of the picture digitally for the final result. From the left, the characters express different reactions to the gust of wind. The female character of the left is still, in a state of shock, while her head is concealed by her scarf, blown by the wind, which dispersed her sheet of papers into the center of the picture. Two men hold their hats in their heads, facing the strength of the wind, while a third man, in between them, looks to the sky as his trilby flies away. Two thin trees in the foreground bend and release some leaves. The landscape appears to be suburban and presents brown fields and a canal, with small shacks, a row of telegraph poles, concrete pillars and other signs that evoke industrial farming.

The book Time and Photography (2010) states that "What is also clear is the way in which Wall uses carefully constructed composition to play with the relationship between the flattened staging of the tableau of figures in the foreground and the receding landscape of modernity that is always the true subject of Wall's pictures, that lies behind them. Our own gaze, in this moment of non-time, follows that of the central figure up to the lost hat sailing overhead, the clarity of whose reproduction belies the naturalism of the photograph as a whole.".
