= Instant Coffee (artist collective) =

- Origin: Toronto, Ontario, Canada
- Years active: 2000–present
- Members: Jenifer Papararo; Jinhan Ko; Cecilia Berkovic; Kelly Lycan; Khan Lee
- Past members: Kate Monro; Jon Sasaki; Timothy Comeau; Darren O'Donnell; Stephen Crowhurst
- Website: instantcoffee.org

Instant Coffee is a Canadian artist collective founded in 2000 and based in Toronto, Ontario, with activity in Vancouver, British Columbia. The collective is known for service-oriented, event-based, and installation art practices that emphasize social interaction and collaboration across artistic disciplines.

== History ==
Instant Coffee was formed in Toronto in 2000 as a service-oriented artist collective operating outside conventional gallery structures. Since its founding, the collective has expanded and contracted in membership and has maintained an ongoing presence in both Toronto and Vancouver.

The collective emerged in part as a response to divisions between studio practice, exhibition contexts, and social space, creating environments where artistic production and informal social interaction intersect.

== Artistic practice ==
Instant Coffee’s practice frequently blurs distinctions between artwork and audience through participatory installations, events, and social gatherings. Their approach has been associated with earlier models of participatory art, including 1960s “Happenings,” adapted through contemporary service-oriented and brand-aware strategies.

Projects have included installations such as the Urban Disco Trailer, Light Bar, and participatory works including Instant Coffee Bass-Bed and Nooks, which function as temporary social environments rather than discrete art objects.

== Activities and public projects ==
Instant Coffee’s activities have included exhibitions, public installations, community events, and the operation of artist-focused email listservs in multiple Canadian cities.

Notable projects include:

- Disco Fallout Shelter, presented in 2009 at the Toronto Sculpture Garden and as part of the Subvision festival in Hamburg, Germany.
- Nooks, exhibited at the Vancouver Art Gallery as part of the exhibition How Soon Is Now.
- Light Bar, presented as part of Assume Nothing: New Social Practice at the Art Gallery of Greater Victoria.

The collective has also maintained email announcement lists for circulating information about exhibitions and events in multiple Canadian cities.

== Membership ==
Instant Coffee operates as a flexible collective with membership shifting over time according to project needs and geographic location. While the group has maintained a core of recurring collaborators, participation has remained fluid rather than fixed.
