= Peter Morin (artist) =

Canadian artist (born 1977)

- Born: September 8, 1977 (age 48); Telegraph Creek, British Columbia, Canada
- Known for: Performance, Curation and Author

Peter Morin is a Tahltan Nation artist, author, curator and professor at the Ontario College of Art and Design. He was born on September 8, 1977, in Telegraph Creek, British Columbia, Canada and identifies as member of the Crow clan. He addresses the issues of decolonization as well as Indigenous identity and language in his practice.

== Education ==
Morin completed his Masters of Fine Art at the University of British Columbia Okanagan in 2010, and a Bachelor of Visual Arts at the Emily Carr University of Art and Design in 2001. He also completed the Summer Publishing Program at Simon Fraser University in 2005, attended the Gulf Island Film and Television School in 2002 and obtained a Diploma of Fine Arts from Kwantlen Polytechnic University in 1997.

== Curation ==
Morin curated several exhibitions including at the Museum of Anthropology, Bill Reid Gallery, Western Front, Burnaby Art Gallery, and at the Satellite Gallery.

== Exhibitions ==
Morin has exhibited his work internationally and has worked with numerous other artists in a variety of shows.

=== Solo ===
- Ceremony Experiments 1 Though 8, Urban Shaman Gallery, 2013
- Circle, Urban Shaman Gallery, 2011
- Peter Morin's Museum, Satellite Gallery, 2010
- Circle, FINA Gallery, 2010
- Memory Talking Stick, Open Space Arts Society, 2010
- 12 Making Objects, Open Space Arts Society, 2009
- In Order to Contemplate the Making, LIVE Biennalle of Performance Art, 2009
- This is How We Protect Stones, The Ministry of Casual Living, 2009
- Things That Are Left Behind For Ravens, ODD Gallery, 2007
- Stop, Drop, and Bingo, Urban Shaman Gallery, 2004
- These Are My Creations, Says Crow, You Can't Take Them Away, Grunt Gallery, 2001

=== Group ===
- Witnesses: Art and Canada's Indian Residential Schools, Moris and Helen Belkin Art Gallery, 2013
- Drawuary: Not A Day Goes By, Gallery Gachet, 2013
- Talking Stick, Roundhouse Community Centre, 2012
- Best Before, McMaster University, 2011
- Challenging Traditions, McMicheal Canadian Art Collection, 2009
- Reply All, Art Metropolle, 2009
- Crazy Making, Gallery Gachet, 2007
- Healing and Transformation, Ministry of Casual Living, 2007
- Re-Translation: Land and Language, A Space Gallery, 2007
- Protection Paint: The Stories on Stones, Gallery Gachet, 2006

== Published works ==
Morin has written and contributed to several books, articles, and art reviews. These include Carrying on "Irregardless": Humour in Contemporary Northwest Coast Art in 2012, My Story of Making and Sewing Hides in 2012, Peter Morin's Museum in 2011, Access All Areas : Conversations On Engaged Art in 2008, Lawrence Paul Yuxweluptun: Neo-Native Drawings and Other Works in 2010 and Wibhun in 2007. Some of his art reviews include A Crow About Town in 2005, and 2400 An Indian Odyssey Article in 2003.

== Residency ==
=== Artist residencies ===
- Algoma University, 2013
- Open Space Arts Society, 2010
- Roundhouse Community Centre, 2005

=== Curator residencies ===
- Open Space Arts Society, 2012
- Camosun College, 2009
- Roundhouse Community Centre, 2003

== Awards ==
Morin received the Hnatyshyn Foundation Mid-Career Outstanding Achievement as an Artist Award in 2016, the Victoria 150 Award in 2012 and the Fulmer Award in First Nations Art Award in 2010. In 2014, he was longlisted for the Sobey Art Award.
