= Ingrid Baxter =

Canadian artist

- Born: 1938; Spokane, Washington
- Known for: Conceptual artist, photographer
- Movement: Conceptual art

Ingrid Baxter RCA is a conceptual artist, a co-founder of N.E. Thing Co. and founder of Deep Cove Canoe and Kayak Centre in Deep Cove, North Vancouver where she currently operates.

== Life and career ==
Baxter was born in Spokane, Washington in 1938 under the name of Elaine (later changed to Ingrid). She studied classical piano performance at the University of Idaho and graduated with a Bachelor of Art in 1960. While studying she met artist Iain Baxter and they married in 1959. She then taught at Washington State University in Pullman, Washington along with her husband. Iain, Ingrid and John Friel established the art group "IT" but it only lasted one year before Iain and Ingrid split off to form N.E. Baxter Thing Co. This was later changed and legally established in 1967 to N.E.Thing Co. to maintain anonymity. Ingrid and Iain went on to have two children, who would travel with them for art projects.

After the couple split, Ingrid moved on to get her master's degree and founded the Deep Cove Canoe and Kayak Centre, which has been running for over 35 years. It has grown substantially with more than 60 employees facilitating the Deep Cove location.

== N.E. Thing Co. ==
Iain and Ingrid Baxter worked collaboratively to form N.E.Thing Co. They set up their company with a research department, a projects department, a photo department, a things department and so on. The Baxters played upon situationists' ideas and incorporated Henri Lefebvre's philosophies into everyday life. Their art practice often involved inviting other artists, curators, and officials over to their home and studio in North Vancouver for social gatherings or to stay for periods of time. Because their income was becoming more unstable, they built a restaurant called "Eye Scream" as a survival technique and art project. The project brought them into more debt and the two ended up splitting because of the trauma. When Ingrid and Iain divorced in 1978, the company also disbanded.

Many years after the split of N.E.Thing Co. in 2018, the MacKenzie Art Gallery exhibited a response to one of the N.E.Thing Co. exhibitions "Celebration of the Body" from 1976.

== Honours ==
- Royal Canadian Academy of Arts

== Bibliography ==
- Baxter, Iain and Ingrid Baxter. You Are Now in the Middle of a N.E. Thing Co. Landscape: Works by Iain and Ingrid Baxter, 1965–1971. Vancouver: The Gallery, 1993. ISBN 0-88865-296-8
- Baxter&, Iain, James Patten and Christophe Domino. Passing Through: Iain Baxter& Photographs, 1958–1983. Windsor, Ont.: Art Gallery of Windsor, 2006. ISBN 0-919837-75-1
- Knight, Derek, Iain Baxter and Ingrid Baxter. N.E. Thing Co: The Ubiquitous Concept. Oakville, Ont.: Oakville Galleries, 1995. ISBN 0-921027-56-7
- Mewburn, Charity. Sixteen Hundred Miles North of Denver. Vancouver: Morris and Helen Belkin Art Gallery, 1999. ISBN 0-88865-606-8
