= After "Invisible Man" by Ralph Ellison, the Prologue =

Photograph by Jeff Wall

After "Invisible Man" by Ralph Ellison, the Prologue is a color photograph by Jeff Wall created in 1999–2000. It has the dimensions of 174 by 250.8 cm and is exhibited in a lightbox. The staged photograph belongs to the collection of the Museum of Modern Art, in New York.

== Description ==
The photograph was staged in a Vancouver, British Columbia, studio, and is inspired by the prologue of the celebrated novel by African-American writer Ralph Ellison, Invisible Man (1952). The protagonist of the novel lives in a basement of a building in Harlem, where he has wired the entire ceiling with 1369 lights, whose electricity is illegally siphoned. Wall took inspiration from the description at the novel and from his own imagination. The photograph depicts the unnamed leading character of the novel in the comfort of his basement, with several commodities, poorly organized, but where the large amount of illumination stands out. Wall explained:

"The picture […] ought to overcome the subject matter and make its source superfluous," "That viewer, not having read the book and not intending to read it, by still enjoying and appreciating the picture can be thought of as having written his or her own novel. The viewer's own experience and associations will do that. These unwritten novels are a form in which the experience of art is carried over into everyday life."

John McDonald stated that is one of the photographs, where "Wall has allowed himself the freedom of creating a scene based on his own visualisation of a text. By clearly identifying the part of the novel to which he refers, Wall is inviting us to compare his version with the written word, as if he were the director of a film. It may be significant that the figures in both pictures face away from us, shifting the emphasis from the character to the setting."
