= Cecilia Berkovic =

Canadian artist

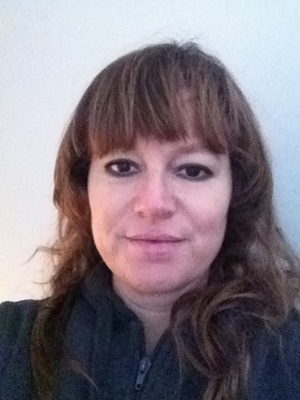
Cecilia Berkovic

Cecilia Berkovic is a Toronto-based mixed media artist, sculptor and graphic designer.

Berkovic received her MFA from the Milton Avery Graduate School of the Arts at Bard College in New York, and has held residencies at the Banff Centre for the Arts in Alberta, Canada, and at the Bauhaus Dessau Foundation. She has been a member of the artist collective Instant Coffee since 2001 and a member of the board of directors at Gallery TPW since 2005. She has also taught at Ryerson University. As part of Mercer Union's international project Advertising By Artists, Berkovic's work was published in The Wire, They Shoot Homos Don't They?, Cabinet, and Border Crossings. Recent work includes poster projects for Nuit Blanche and AIDS Action Now! in Toronto.

== Exhibitions ==
- Post No Bills, July 8 to July 31, 1999, BUS Gallery, Toronto
- First Comes Love, October 9 to November 10, 2002, Hartnett Gallery, University of Rochester, Rochester, New York
- Mellow Drama, January 9 to February 1, 2004, Katharine Mulherin Contemporary Art Projects, Toronto
- National Geographer & Stoner Chicks, September 6 to 29, 2007, Katharine Mulherin Contemporary Art Projects, Toronto
- Advertising by Artists, February 2007 to April 2008, Art Metropole, Toronto
- That's So Gay: The New Queer, June, 2011, Toronto
- No Tears, 2012, Toronto
- We Can't Compete, January 23 to March 6, 2014, University of Lethbridge Art Gallery
- Taking a Part, 20 June to 26 July 2014, Mercer Union, Toronto
