= Catherine Crowston =

Canadian curator (born 1963)

- Born: November 20, 1963 (age 62)
- Occupation: Curator

Catherine Crowston RCA (born November 20, 1963) is the executive director and chief curator of the Art Gallery of Alberta. Crowston was previously the director of the Walter Phillips Gallery at The Banff Centre and the curator of the Edmonton Art Gallery. She was awarded the Medal for Outstanding Achievement by the Royal Canadian Academy of Arts in 2002.
