= Jean-François Chevrier =

French art historian

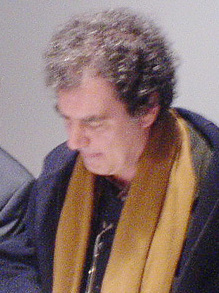
- Chevrier in 2007
- Born: 1954 (age 71–72); Lyon, France

Academic background
- Education: École normale supérieure

Jean-François Chevrier is an art theorist and historian, art critic and exhibition curator. He lives and works in Paris. He is a Professor in the History of Contemporary Art at the École nationale supérieure des Beaux-Arts in Paris, after having taught at the Université Paris-Nanterre and Paris VIII.

In his essays Chevrier has examined the place of photography – and by extension modern and contemporary art – among the arts and the media.

Exhibitions and catalogues he has curated and co-edited include Matter of Facts (Nantes et al., 1988), Une autre objectivité / Another Objectivity (London, 1988), Photo Kunst (Stuttgart, 1989), Craigie Horsfield (London, 1989), Lieux communs, figures singulières (Paris, 1991), Walker Evans and Dan Graham (Rotterdam, 1992) and Craigie Horsfield. La ciutat de la gent (Barcelona, 1996). He has written essays on Jean-Marc Bustamante, John Coplans, Ken Lum, Michelangelo Pistoletto, Gerhard Richter and Brassaï.
