= Kathleen S. Bartels =

Canadian curator

Kathleen S. Bartels (born 1956) is the Executive Director and CEO of the Museum of Contemporary Art Toronto (MOCA). Prior to joining the museum, she was Director of the Vancouver Art Gallery in Vancouver, B.C., where she guided the Gallery’s growth in its arts programs and exhibitions. She controversially left the Vancouver Art Gallery prior to the expiration of her contract.

== Career ==
Bartels, who is American, was largely raised in Guam, and studied photography and Pacific art before arriving in Los Angeles where she was Assistant Director at the Museum of Contemporary Art for more than a decade. In 2000, Bartels was made director at the Vancouver Art Gallery.

To date, Bartels has co-curated four Gallery exhibitions with Canadian artist Jeff Wall, including Anthony Hernandez (2009), Kerry James Marshall (2010), Patrick Faigenbaum (2013), and Martin Honert (2013). Bartels is also currently serving as a Board Member of the British Columbia Achievement Foundation.

== Selected publications ==
- Anthony Hernandez. Vancouver Art Gallery. 2009.
- Kai Althoff. Vancouver Art Gallery. 2009.
- Kerry James Marshall. Vancouver Art Gallery. 2010.
- Martin Honert. Vancouver Art Gallery. 2013.
- Patrick Faigenbaum. Vancouver Art Gallery. 2013.

== Honours ==
In 2015, Bartels won the Outstanding Individual Award by the Downtown Vancouver Business Improvement Association. Bartels was also named one of British Columbia's 35 Most Influential Women in February 2016.
