= Jane Buyers =

Canadian artist (born 1948)

- Born: 1948 (age 77–78); Toronto, Ontario, Canada
- Education: honours B.A. in Visual Art from York University (1973) and a Master of Education in History and Philosophy from the University of Toronto (1990)
- Partner: Don Druick
- Elected: member, the Royal Canadian Academy of Arts (2002)

Jane Buyers RCA (born 1948) is a Canadian multimedia artist who evokes the human presence and its impulse to manipulate through drawing, sculpture and printmaking. Her investigation and practice has a formal and thematic substance. Themes that have always preoccupied Buyers include books, labour and the domestic ritual. She is based in Elora, Ontario.

== Career ==
After getting her honours B.A. in Visual Art from York University (1973) and a Master of Education in History and Philosophy from the University of Toronto (1990), Buyers taught fine art at institutions in the Toronto region, was a Fine Art instructor at Fanshawe College, London, for seven years and Professor in the Fine Arts department at the University of Waterloo from 1988 to 2010, where she is now Distinguished Professor Emerita.

Much of Buyers work concentrates on labour and repetitive work to build a form. Earlier, she referenced domestic approximations and substitutes and later, tools and books. She is interested in the area between the utilitarian and the decorative, the natural and the artificial, the organic and the fabricated. Buyers says that process has always been an important component of her work:

process as work, as labour, as the manipulation of materials, as the transformation of one element into another; and process as learning, as the gaining and dissemination of knowledge [....] My work juxtaposes cultural artifacts with nature. My interest is not in nature as "natural" but in nature as the site of complex, contradictory process of manipulation and idealizations expressive of a desire to be connected, to make order, to find a pattern.

Buyers has had over forty solo exhibitions and participated in more than one hundred group exhibitions. Her most important solo exhibitions include Inscriptions at the Robert McLaughlin Gallery in 2005 which travelled to the Koffler Gallery, Toronto and the UW Art Gallery, Waterloo; and a thirty-year survey show titled Gather…Arrange…Maintain, curated by Crystal Mowry and circulated by the Kitchener-Waterloo Art Gallery (2013). The exhibition catalogue included an interview by Nancy Campbell and a conversation with John Armstrong. Her recent group exhibitions include Into the Woods at the Canadian Clay and Glass Gallery, Waterloo (2006); Pictured: Image and Object in Canadian Sculpture, and Making Space, both Art Gallery of Nova Scotia (2007-2008 and 2021). In Making Space, her work was shown with that of Vikky Alexander, Edward Burtynsky and others.

She has given many public lectures. In 2020, she spoke at the 2020 Wild Writers Literary Festival on Aging and Creativity.

Buyers was elected to the Royal Canadian Academy of Arts in 2002. She has been awarded a number of Canada Council and Ontario Arts Council grants. Her work is in many private and public collections including the Art Gallery of Guelph; the Art Gallery of Nova Scotia; MacLaren Art Centre, Barrie; Museum London; and the Art Museum of the Americas, Washington D.C.

Her work has been represented by Paul Petro Contemporary Art, Toronto, since 1997.

== Bibliography ==
- Jane Buyers : gather...arrange...maintain. Kitchener and London: Kitchener/Waterloo Art Gallery and Museum London. 2015.
