= Jenifer Papararo =

Jenifer Papararo (born 1966 in Chelmsford, UK) is a curator and writer of contemporary art and founding member of curatorial/design/service collective Instant Coffee. She currently holds the position of Executive Director at the Plug In Institute of Contemporary Art in Winnipeg, Manitoba. She was previously a curator at the Contemporary Art Gallery in Vancouver and the director of Mercer Union, Toronto. She is credited with staging the first solo exhibitions of international artists Mark Leckey and Jeremy Blake in Canada. Her writing has appeared in Canadian Art, Mix Magazine, C and Lola as well as numerous exhibition essays and catalogue contributions. She was "selected from a national sweep of experts in the fields of contemporary art" to act as one of the "Nominators" for the 2017 Scotiabank Photography Award.

== Selected writing ==
- "Interview with Catriona Jeffries", Hunter & Cook #10, 2011
- "Frances Stark, I’ve Had It and A Half", C Magazine #111, 2011
- Sharon Hayes: Votes for Women, Contemporary Art Gallery Publications, 2011
- OK Big Time: Ruti Sela & Mayaan Amir, Contemporary Art Gallery Publication, 2011
- Damian Moppett: Just an Amateur, The Visible Work, Catalogue Essay, 2005
- Caught in the Act, an Anthology of Performance Art, YYZ Publications, 2004
- Mark Leckey: Soundsystem, Exhibition Essay, Mercer Union Publications, 2004
