= Mimic (photograph) =

Photograph by Jeff Wall

Mimic (1982), Jeff Wall

Mimic is a color photograph created by Canadian photographer Jeff Wall, in 1982. It is a staged photograph that tries to recreate a scene that he once witnessed of racial prejudice. The picture is held at the Ydessa Hendeles Art Foundation, in Toronto.

== History and description ==
Wall, after his previous studio work, decided to take pictures in the street, in 1982. These pictures, like his former works, would be staged, with actors. He took inspiration from an incident of racial abuse that he had witnessed, while walking on a street of Vancouver, and decided to recreate it in a staged photograph. Wall described this picture as a way of trying "to bring street photography and ‘cinematography’ together.” While he took inspiration of street photography by artists like Robert Frank and Garry Winogrand, he created something original, what he called “cinematographic photographs”.

The scene depicts an Asian man, well dressed, walking in the left of a sidewalk, while a couple walks to the right. The bearded man, dressed in a more casual way, stares at him, while pointing to his own eyes, making an offensive racial gesture of slanted eyes, in reference to the Asian man ethnicity. The woman, dressed in red shorts, who is walking while holding the man's hand, possibly her husband, doesn't seem to be paying any attention to the scene.

== Reception ==
Graham W. Bell states: "Along with broader references to the history of photography, there are also strong ties to the history of painting in the way that he approaches photography. Pieces like Mimic are meant to be hung on the wall like a painting, and not stored in an album or looked at solely as plates in a book. The sheer size and luminosity of the lightboxes makes sure that one cannot ever get the full effect of Wall’s art from a reproduction."

David Campany writes that "Mimic can be read in several ways: photography as a 'mirror of nature' mimics the world; photography mimics cinema or street photography; the Caucasian man mimics the Asian man; models mimic actors who mimic real people (...)".
