= Jeff Wall =

Canadian photographer

Jeff Wall OC RSA
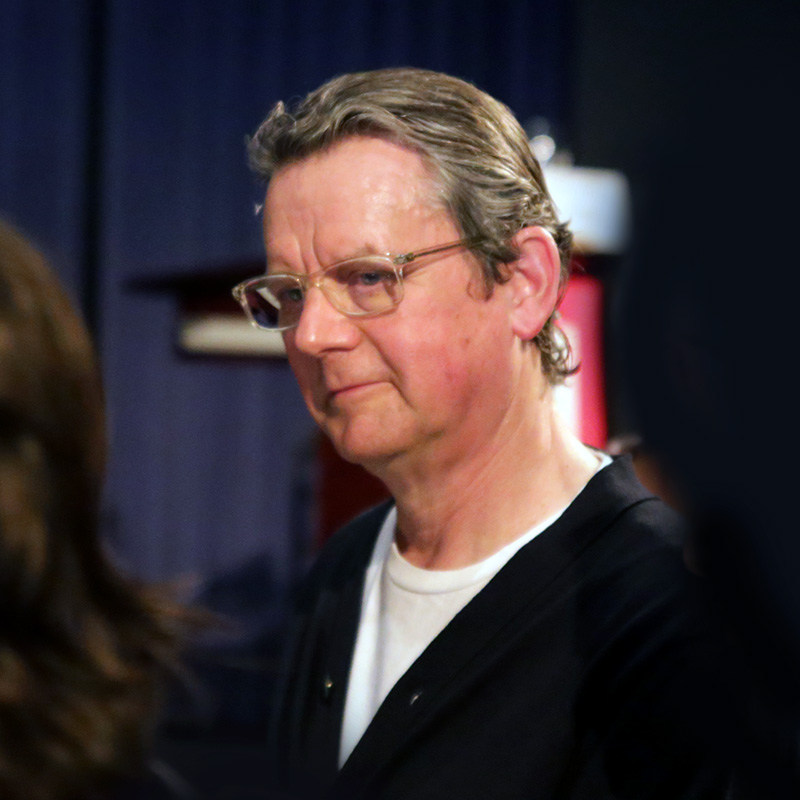
- Jeff Wall at Paris Photo 2014
- Born: Jeffrey Wall; September 29, 1946 (age 79); Vancouver, British Columbia, Canada
- Education: University of British Columbia; Courtauld Institute of Art
- Known for: Photographer
- Notable work: Picture for Women (1979); Mimic (1982); A Sudden Gust of Wind (after Hokusai) (1993)
- Movement: Vancouver School
- Awards: Hasselblad Award (2002)

Jeffrey Wall, OC, RSA (born September 29, 1946) is a Canadian photographer. He is an artist best known for his large-scale back-lit Cibachrome photographs and art history writing. Early in his career, he helped define the Vancouver School and he has published essays on the work of his colleagues and fellow Vancouverites Rodney Graham, Ken Lum, and Ian Wallace. His photographic tableaux often take Vancouver's mixture of natural beauty, urban decay, and postmodern and industrial featurelessness as their backdrop.

== Career ==
Wall received his MA from the University of British Columbia in 1970, with a thesis titled Berlin Dada and the Notion of Context. That same year, he stopped making art. With his English wife, Jeannette, whom he had met as a student in Vancouver, and their two young sons, he moved to London to do postgraduate work from 1970 to 1973 at the Courtauld Institute, where he studied with T.J. Clark. Wall was assistant professor at the Nova Scotia College of Art and Design (1974–75), associate professor at Simon Fraser University (1976–87), and lectured at the European Graduate School. He was a full professor at the University of British Columbia until his retirement in 1999. Wall has published essays on Dan Graham, Rodney Graham, Roy Arden, Ken Lum, Stephan Balkenhol, On Kawara, and other contemporary artists. As a trained art historian, he has also discussed his own work extensively. Wall's essays and interviews conveying his philosophical interests have shaped critical discussions of his career.

== Artistic practice ==
Wall experimented with conceptual art while an undergraduate at UBC. He then made no art until 1977, when he produced his first backlit photo-transparencies. Most of these are staged and refer to the history of art and philosophical problems of representation. Their compositions often allude to artists like Diego Velázquez, Hokusai, and Édouard Manet, or to writers such as Franz Kafka, Yukio Mishima, and Ralph Ellison.

Wall's work beginning in the late 1970s experimented with notions of theatricality influenced by television, advertising, and commercial window displays. Presenting his first gallery exhibition in 1978 as an "installation" rather than as a photography show, the artist placed The Destroyed Room in the storefront window of the Nova Gallery, enclosing it in a plasterboard wall.

Mimic (1982)

Mimic (1982) typifies Wall's cinematographic style and according to art historian Michael Fried is "characteristic of Wall's engagement in his art of the 1980s with social issues". A 198 × 226 cm colour transparency, it shows a white couple and an Asian man walking towards the camera. The sidewalk, flanked by parked cars and residential and light-industrial buildings, suggests a North American industrial suburb. The woman is wearing red shorts and a white top displaying her midriff; her bearded, unkempt boyfriend wears a denim vest. The Asian man is casual but well-dressed in comparison, in a collared shirt and slacks. As the couple overtake the man, the boyfriend makes an ambiguous but apparently obscene and racist gesture, holding his upraised middle finger close to the corner of his eye, "slanting" his eye in mockery of the Asian man's eyes. The picture resembles a candid shot that captures the moment and its implicit social tensions, but is actually a recreation of an exchange witnessed by the artist.

Picture for Women (1979). Art critic Jed Perl describes Picture for Women as Wall's signature piece.

Picture for Women is a 142.5 × 204.5 cm Cibachrome transparency mounted on a lightbox. Along with The Destroyed Room, Wall considers Picture for Women to be his first success in challenging photographic tradition. According to Tate Modern, this success allows Wall to reference "both popular culture (the illuminated signs of cinema and advertising hoardings) and the sense of scale he admires in classical painting. As three-dimensional objects, the lightboxes take on a sculptural presence, impacting on the viewer’s physical sense of orientation in relationship to the work."

There are two figures in the scene, Wall himself, and a woman looking into the camera. In a profile of Wall in The New Republic, art critic Jed Perl describes Picture for Women as Wall's signature piece, "since it doubles as a portrait of the late-twentieth-century artist in his studio." Art historian David Campany calls Picture for Women an important early work for Wall as it establishes central themes and motifs found in much of his later work.

A response to Manet's Un bar aux Folies Bergère, the Tate Modern wall text for Picture of Women, from the 2005–2006 exhibition Jeff Wall Photographs 1978–2004, outlines the influence of Manet's painting:

Un bar aux Folies Bergère by Édouard Manet, completed in 1882

In Manet’s painting, a barmaid gazes out of frame, observed by a shadowy male figure. The whole scene appears to be reflected in the mirror behind the bar, creating a complex web of viewpoints. Wall borrows the internal structure of the painting, and motifs such as the light bulbs that give it spatial depth. The figures are similarly reflected in a mirror, and the woman has the absorbed gaze and posture of Manet’s barmaid, while the man is the artist himself. Though issues of the male gaze, particularly the power relationship between male artist and female model, and the viewer’s role as onlooker, are implicit in Manet’s painting, Wall updates the theme by positioning the camera at the centre of the work, so that it captures the act of making the image (the scene reflected in the mirror) and, at the same time, looks straight out at us.

Wall's work advances an argument for the need for pictorial art. Some of Wall's photographs are complicated productions involving cast, sets, crews and digital postproduction. They have been characterized as one-frame cinematic productions. Susan Sontag ended her last book, Regarding the Pain of Others (2003), with a long, laudatory discussion of one of them, Dead Troops Talk (A Vision After an Ambush of a Red Army Patrol near Moqor, Afghanistan, Winter 1986) (1992), calling Wall's Goya-influenced depiction of a made-up event "exemplary in its thoughtfulness and power."

Jeff Wall A Sudden Gust of Wind (after Hokusai), 1993

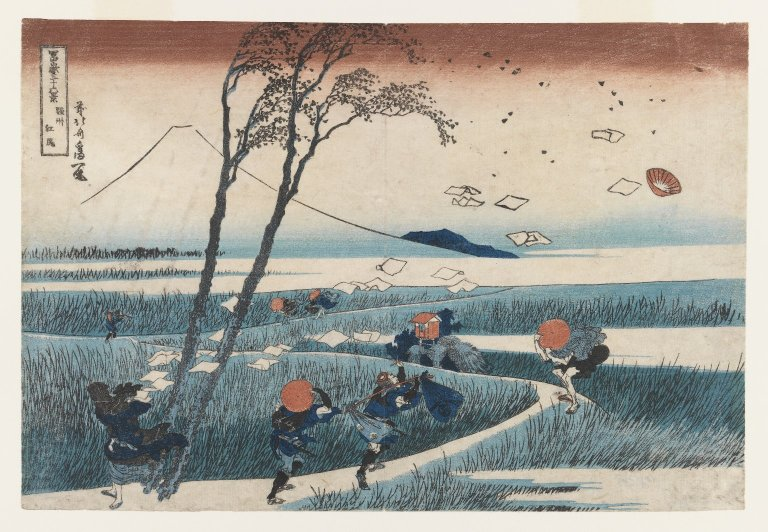
Katsushika Hokusai Yejiri Station, Province of Suruga, ca. 1832

While Wall is known for large-scale photographs of contemporary everyday genre scenes populated with figures, in the early 1990s he became interested in still lifes. He distinguishes between unstaged "documentary" pictures, like Still Creek, Vancouver, winter 2003, and "cinematographic" pictures, produced using a combination of actors, sets, and special effects, such as A Sudden Gust of Wind (after Hokusai), 1993. Based on Yejiri Station, Province of Suruga (ca. 1832) a woodblock print by Katsushika Hokusai, A Sudden Gust of Wind recreates the depicted 19th-century Japanese scene in contemporary British Columbia, using actors and took over a year to produce 100 photographs in order "to achieve a seamless montage that gives the illusion of capturing a real moment in time."

Since the early 1990s, Wall has used digital technology to create montages of different individual negatives, blending them into what appears as a single unified photograph. His signature works are large transparencies mounted on light boxes; he says he conceived this format when he saw back-lit advertisements at bus stops during a trip between Spain and London. In 1995, Wall began making traditional silver gelatine black and white photographs, and these have become an increasingly significant part of his work. Examples were exhibited at Kassel's documenta X.

First shown at documenta 11, After "Invisible Man" by Ralph Ellison, the Prologue (1999–2000) represents a well-known scene from Ellison's classic novel. Wall's version shows us the cellar room, "warm and full of light," in which Ellison's narrator lives, complete with its 1,369 lightbulbs.

== Exhibitions ==
Wall's early group exhibitions include 1969 shows at the Seattle Art Museum, Washington, and Vancouver Art Gallery, and New Multiple Art at the Whitechapel Gallery, London in 1970. His first one-man show was held at Nova Gallery, Vancouver in 1978.

Solo shows include ICA, London (1984), Irish Museum of Modern Art, Dublin, Ireland (1993), Whitechapel Gallery, London (2001), Kunstmuseum Wolfsburg, Wolfsburg, Germany (2001), Museum für Moderne Kunst Frankfurt (2001/2002), Hasselblad Center, Göteborg, Sweden (2002), Astrup Fearnley Museum, Oslo, Norway (2004) and retrospectives at Schaulager, Basel (2005), Tate Modern (2005) and MoMA, New York (2007), Art Institute of Chicago (2007), SFMoMA, San Francisco (2008), Tamayo Museum, Mexico City and Vancouver Art Gallery, Vancouver (2008), and Staatliche Kunstsammlungen, Dresden (2010). Wall was also included in documentas 10 and 11.

For his retrospective at the Palais des Beaux Arts, Brussels in 2011, Wall chose some 130 works by his favorite artists, from 1900s photographer Eugène Atget to film excerpts (Fassbinder, Bergman, the Dardenne brothers) to pieces by contemporaries Thomas Struth and David Claerbout. They were shown alongside 25 of his own pictures.

== Awards and recognition ==
- Hasselblad Award, 2002
- Fellow of the Royal Society of Canada, 2006
- Officer of the Order of Canada, 2007
- Audain Prize for Lifetime Achievement (British Columbia's annual award for the visual arts), 2008
- Wall was included in Blake Gopnik's 2011 list "The 10 Most Important Artists of Today", with Gopnik arguing, "For three decades, Wall has been testing the full range of what pictures can still do and mean, after anti-art had 'proved' them dead."

== Influence ==
Wall's large-scale images and studied compositions are regarded as influential on the Düsseldorf School of Photography led by Andreas Gursky, Thomas Struth, Thomas Ruff, and Candida Höfer. (Gursky has cited Wall as "a great model for me.")

== Publications ==
- Jean-François Chevrier, Thierry de Duve, Boris Groys, Mark Lewis, Arielle Pelenc. Jeff Wall: The Complete Edition. Phaidon, 2009. ISBN 9780714855974
- Jeff Wall. Selected Essays and Interviews. New York: Museum of Modern Art, 2007. ISBN 0-87070-708-6
- Jeff Wall Catalogue Raisonne 2005–2021. Edited by Gary Dufour with contributions by Jean-Francois Chevrier, Thierry de Duve and David Campany. Gagosian and Yale U Press, 2022. ISBN 0300269277

== General references ==
- Hochdörfer, Achim, ed. Jeff Wall: Photographs. Cologne: Walther König, 2003. ISBN 3-88375-698-9
- Merritt, Naomi. ‘Manet's Mirror and Jeff Wall's Picture for Women: Reflection or Refraction?’, Emaj (Electronic Melbourne Art Journal), Issue 4, 2009, emaj: online journal of art
- Newman, Michael. "Towards the Reinvigoration of the 'Western Tableau': Some Notes on Jeff Wall and Duchamp." Oxford Art Journal 30.1 (2007): 81–100.
- Del Río, Víctor. La querella oculta. Jeff Wall y la crítica de la neovanguardia. El Desvelo Ediciones, 2012. Spain. ISBN 9788493866389
- Lauter, Rolf. Jeff Wall: figures & places: selected works from 1978–2000; Frankfurt: Museum für Moderne Kunst, 2001/2002. ISBN 3791326074 ISBN 9783791326078
