= The Destroyed Room (photograph) =

Photograph by Jeff Wall

The Destroyed Room is a color photograph executed by Jeff Wall in 1978. The photograph was entirely created in a set and depicts a room with several damaged items, while the walls also show signs of destruction. The picture has the dimensions of 159 by 234 cm and is exhibited in a lightbox. It is held in the collection of the National Gallery of Canada, in Ottawa.

== Description ==
The photograph was created in a set created to represent a destroyed room. No apparent indications are given for the causes of the destruction, but it can be deduced that it was a woman's room. The room shows a wrecked mattress at the center, surrounded by women's shoes and clothing, and other items. A cupboard, seen at the left corner, had its drawers open and searched. A small dancer figure is left intact at the top of the cupboard, perhaps as an ironic reference. The walls show also signs of destruction, particularly at the center of the room. The left side of the picture demonstrates the artificiality of the image, showing joints and the external wall of the studio.

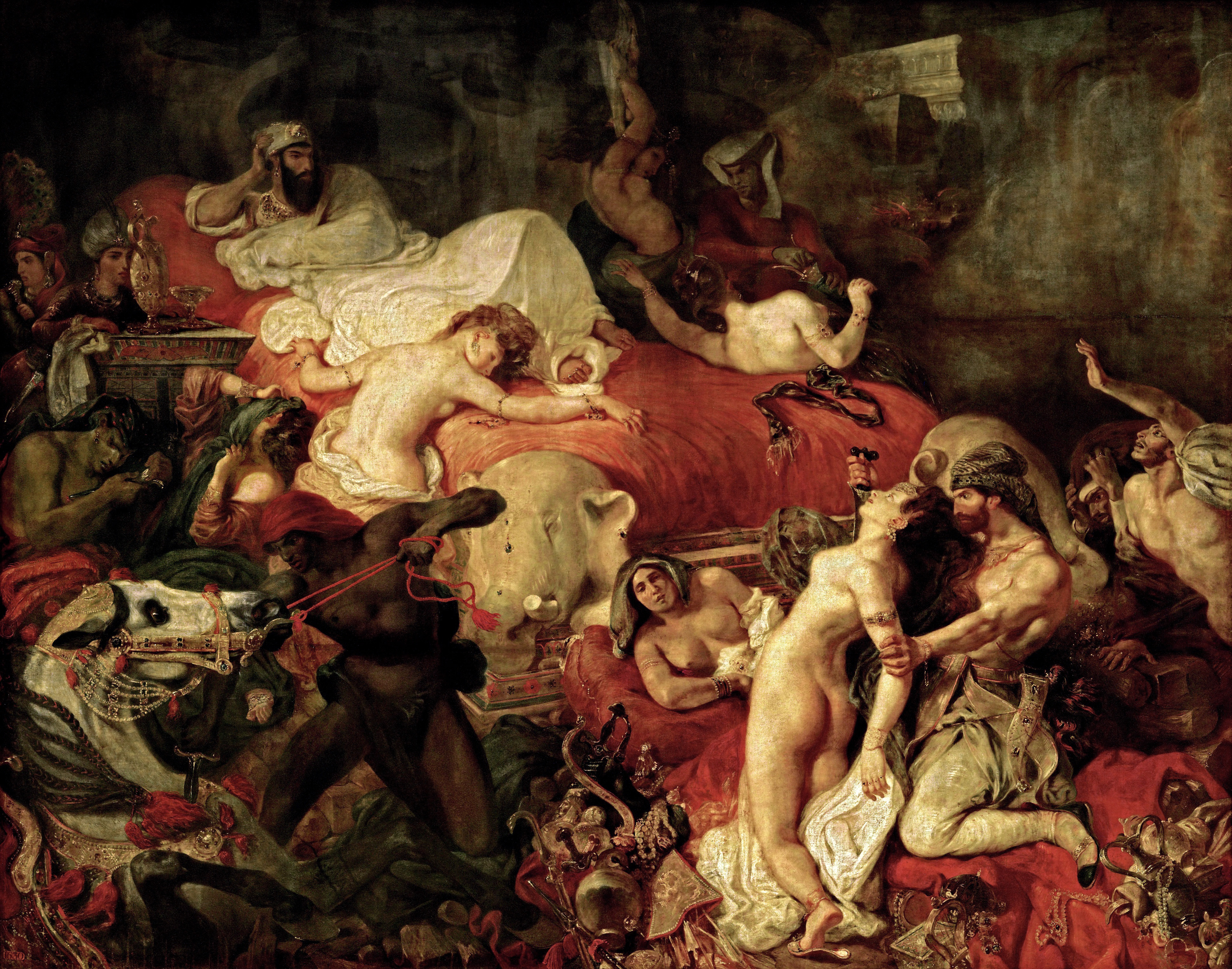
The Death of Sardanapalus by Delacroix

The photograph, like others of the artist, was inspired by a classical work of art, the painting The Death of Sardanapalus (1827) by French Romantic painter Eugène Delacroix. Unlike the original work, there is no direct human presence, violence, cruelty or sexuality, despite the fact that it all can be inferred from the image.

According to Josephine Van De Valle: "It is most of all Delacroix's composition that Jeff Wall echoes: in both works a diagonal line from upper left to bottom right creates a balance and rhythm. And like Delacroix, Wall too chose for a prominent red color palette, suggesting passion and supporting the chaos in the scene."
