= Ian Wallace (artist) =

Canadian artist (born 1943)

- Born: 1943 (age 82–83); Shoreham, England
- Known for: artist

Ian Wallace OC RCA (born 1943) is a British-born Canadian artist, living and working in Vancouver, British Columbia. Wallace has been an influential figure in the development of an internationally acknowledged photographic and conceptual art practice in Vancouver called the Vancouver School since 1965.

== Artistic practice ==
Wallace has exhibited painting and photography nationally and internationally since 1965. He is known for juxtaposing monochrome painting and photography in a way that problematizes the differences between the two mediums, referencing aesthetic and social issues through themes of the studio, the museum, and the street.

== Selected exhibitions ==
In 2010, he began Abstract Paintings I – XII (The Financial District) and in 2014 gave the works to the National Gallery of Canada, complementing his 30 works already in the collection. They were shown at the National Gallery in 2015.

== Education and teaching ==
Wallace was raised in British Columbia and studied art history and theory at the University of British Columbia. During that time, Wallace became involved with Vancouver's artistic scene as a musician and poet while also exploring an interest in Conceptual art. In later photographic and collage work, he would explore the relationships between art forms, including those of photography and painting, as well as language and art.

Wallace taught art history at the University of British Columbia from 1967 to 1970, and then at the Vancouver School of Art (now Emily Carr University of Art and Design) from 1972 to 1998, where he taught a contemporary art course titled Art Now that was one of the earliest to introduce the art of the recent past into the art history curriculum. As a professor, he has had a significant role in shaping the contemporary art scene and advised artist, such as Kelly Wood. Through his emphasis on the importance of a knowledge of art history, his support for visiting artist programs, and his progressive courses that examined the common history of various media including film, photography, and painting, Wallace influenced a generation of artists emerging from the Vancouver scene, including members of the so-called Vancouver School of artists, Jeff Wall, Ken Lum, Stan Douglas, Roy Arden and Rodney Graham.

== Awards ==
In 2004, Wallace received a Governor General's Awards in Visual and Media Arts. He was also named an Officer of the Order of Canada, the second-highest honour for merit, in December 2012. In 2016, he was inducted into the Royal Canadian Academy of Arts.

== Gallery ==
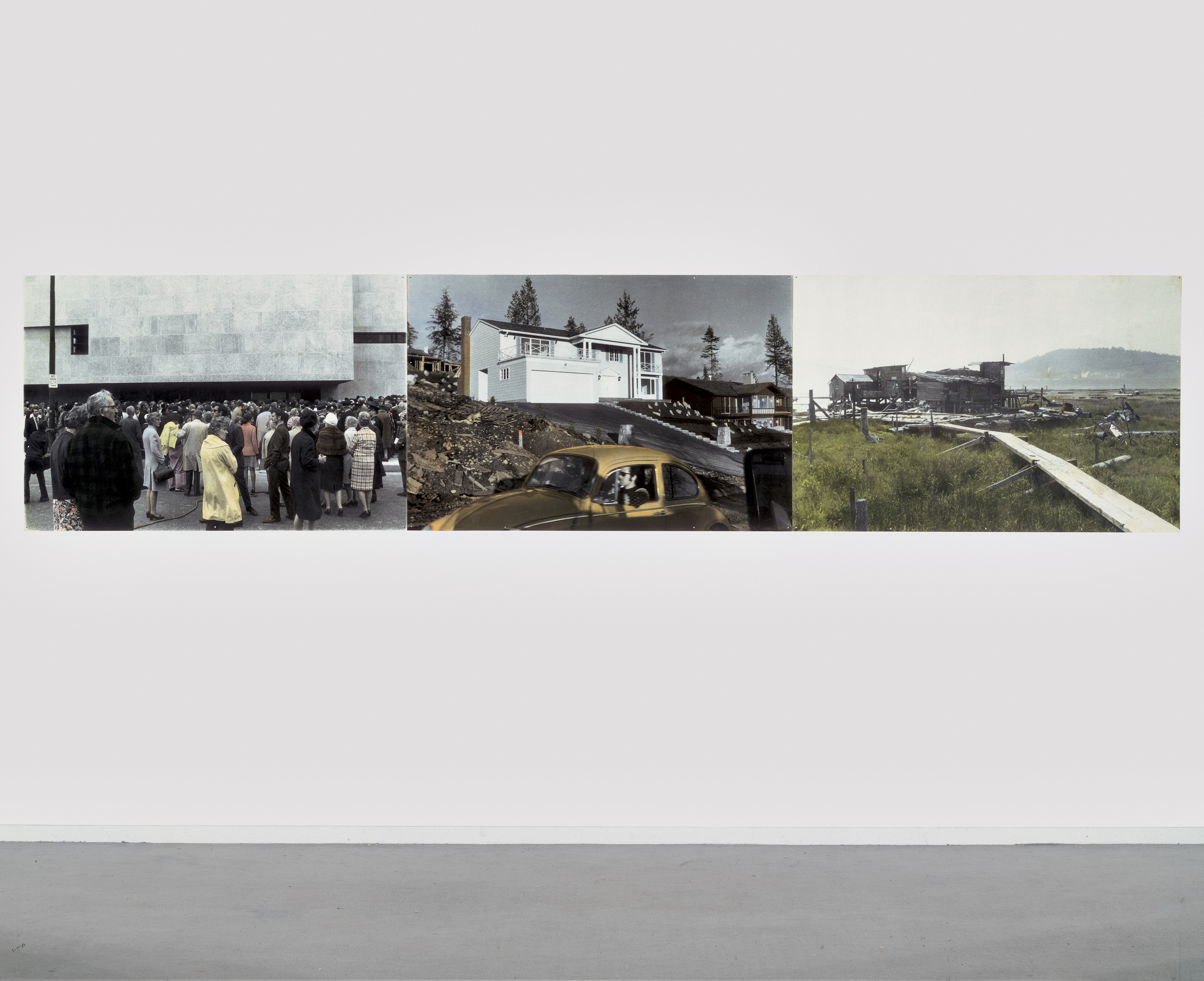

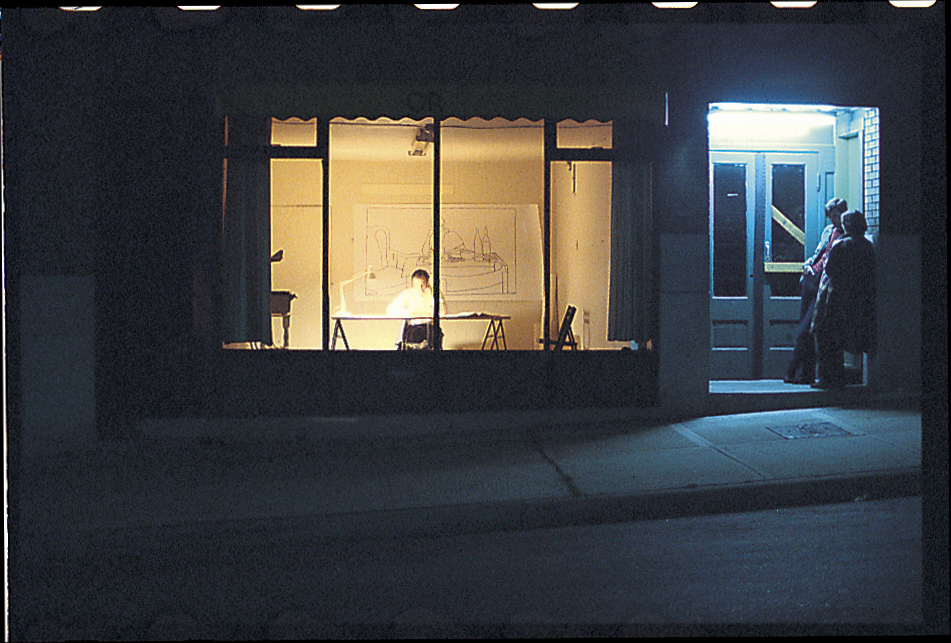

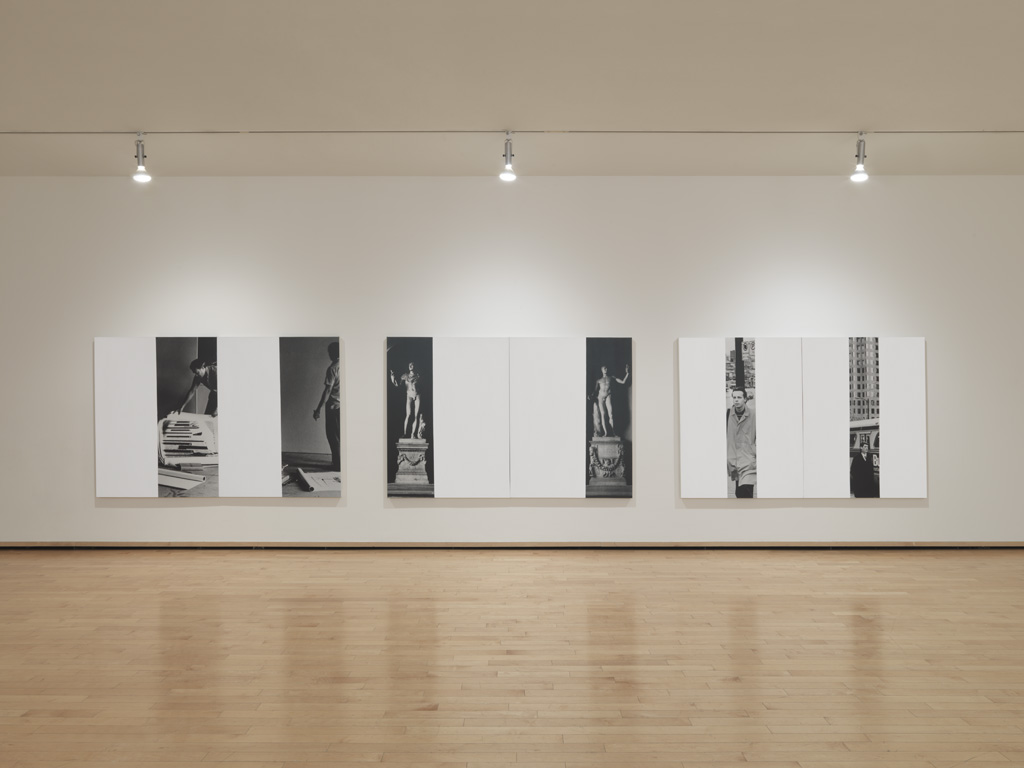

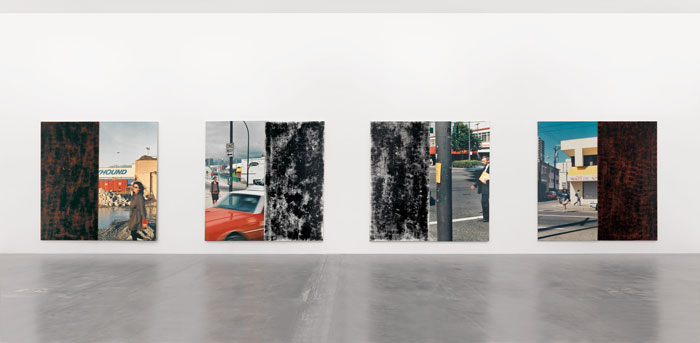

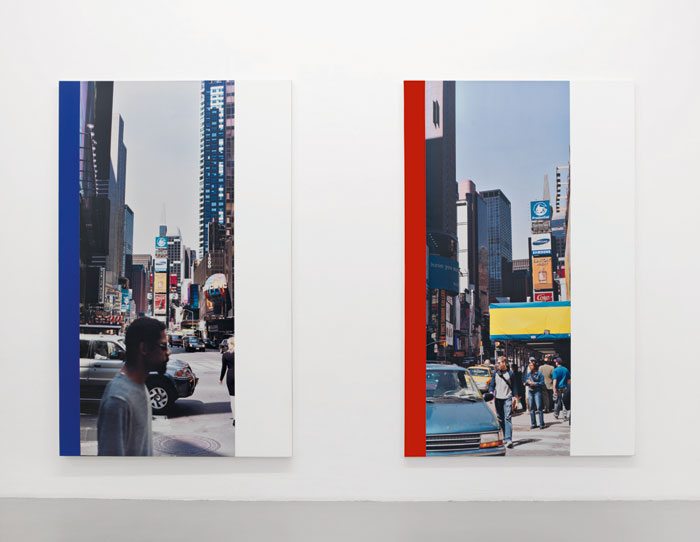

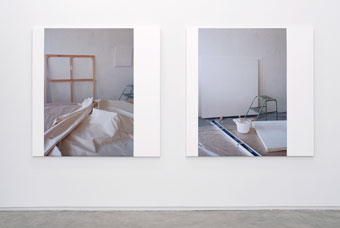

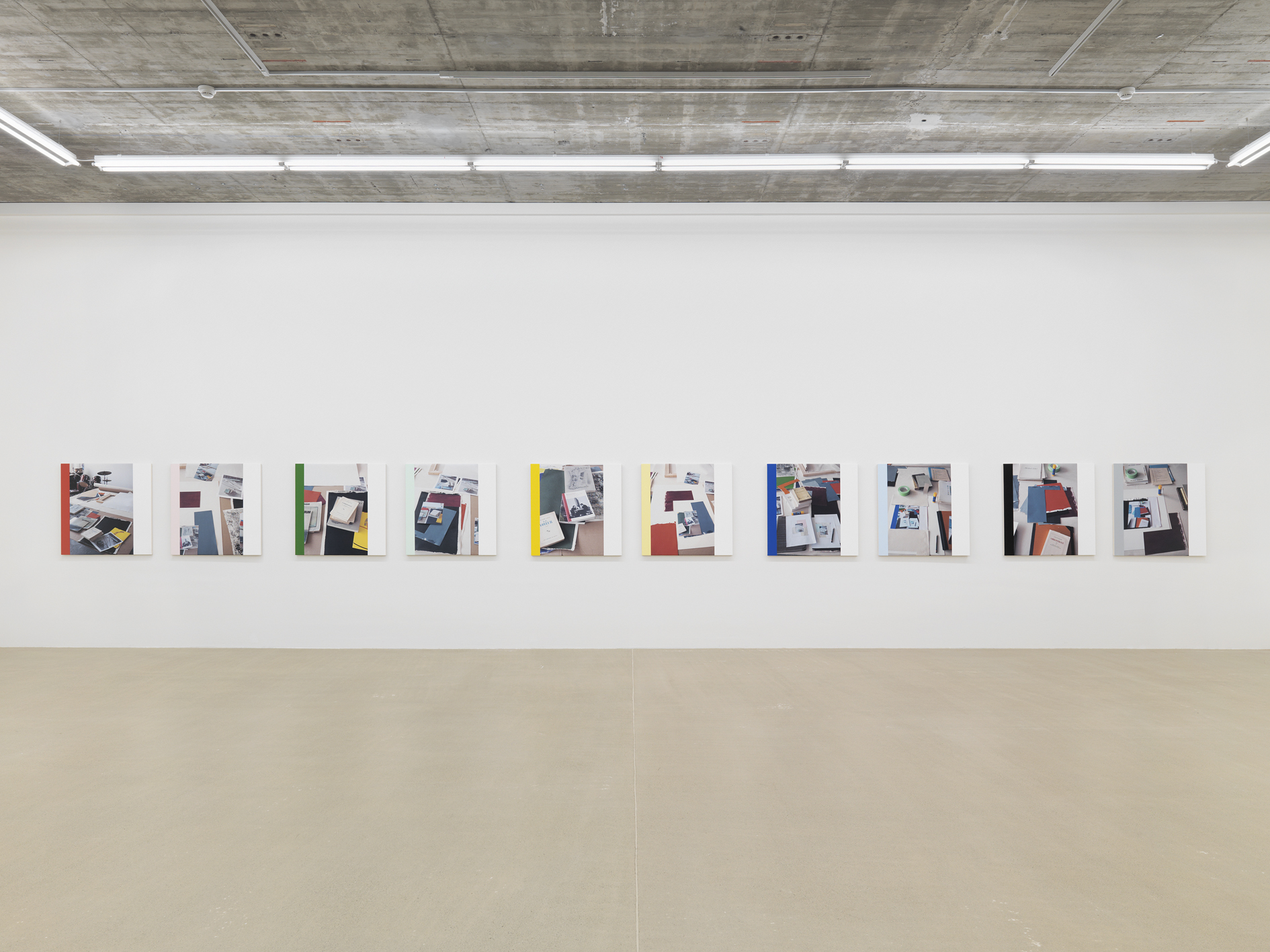

== Bibliography ==
- Bassnett, Sarah; Parsons, Sarah. "Ian Wallace" in Photography in Canada, 1839–1989: An Illustrated History. Toronto: Art Canada Institute, 2023. ISBN 978-1-4871-0309-5
- Ian Wallace: At the Intersection of Painting and Photography, Vancouver Art Gallery, Vancouver and Black Dog Publishing, London UK, 2012
- Tropismes, Galerie Greta Meert, 2012
- Ian Wallace: The Economy of the Image, The Power Plant, Toronto, 2010
- Ian Wallace: A Literature of Images, Kunsthalle Zürich, Kunstverein für die Rheinlande und Westflen, Düsseldorf, Witte de With, co-published by Sternberg Press, 2008
- In the Studio: Ian Wallace, Vancouver: Charles H. Scott Gallery, 2007
- Ian Wallace: Clayoquot Protest, Sprengel Museum Hannover, 1998
- Ian Wallace: The Idea of the University, Vancouver: Fine Arts Gallery, University of British Columbia, 1990
- Ian Wallace: Images, Saint Étienne: Maison de la Culture, 1989
- Ian Wallace: Selected Works, 1970 - 1987, Vancouver: Vancouver Art Gallery, 1988
