= Thierry de Duve =

Belgian art critic and professor

- Born: 21 October 1944 (age 81); Saint-Trond, Belgium
- Occupation: Professor of modern art theory

Thierry de Duve (born 1944) is a Belgian professor of modern art theory and contemporary art theory, and both teaches and publishes books in the field. He is an art critic and curates exhibitions.

== Career ==
He has been a visiting professor at the University of Lille III (France), the Sorbonne (France), MIT, and Johns Hopkins University, and was the Elliot and Roslyn Jaffe Distinguished Visiting Professor in Contemporary Art in Penn's History of Art Department. He was the Kirk Varnedoe Visiting Professor at New York University for the fall semester of 2013. He was the 2015 Theorist in Residence for the CalArts MA in Aesthetics and Politics Program during the fall semester. In 2016, he was appointed Evelyn Kranes Kossak Professor and Distinguished Lecturer in the Department of Art and Art History at Hunter College, City University of New York.

He has also been a fellow at the Center for the Advanced Study of the Visual Arts (CASVA) at the National Gallery of Art in Washington, D.C., on four separate occasions since 1995.

== Personal life ==
He is the son of biochemist Christian de Duve, Nobel Prize winner for his discovery of lysosomes.

== Curating ==
- Look-100 Years of Contemporary Art (Palais des Beaux-Arts, Brussels, 2002)
- Belgium Pavilion for the Venice Biennial (2003)

== Bibliography ==
Books Published in English:

- "Pictorial Nominalism: On Marcel Duchamp's Passage from Painting to the Readymade", Minneapolis: University of Minnesota Press, 1991. (with Polan, D.)
- "The Definitively Unfinished Marcel Duchamp", Cambridge, MIT Press, 1993.
- "Clement Greenberg Between the Lines", Trans. Brian Holmes, 1996
- "Kant After Duchamp", Cambridge, MIT Press, 1998, 484 p. ISBN 0-262-04151-0 (hard : alk. paper)
- "Bernd and Hilla Becher", Munich, Schirmer Art Books, 1999, 159 p. ISBN 3-88814-400-0
- "Roni Horn", Louise Neri, Lynne Cooke, Thierry De Duve, London : Phaidon, 2000, ISBN 0-7148-3865-9 (br.)
- "Look, 100 Years of Contemporary Art", Trans. Simon Pleasance and Fronza Woods; Ghent-Amsterdam: Ludion, 2001
- "Sewn in the Sweatshops of Marx", Trans. Rosalind E. Kraus; Chicago : University of Chicago Press, 2012, ISBN 0-226-92237-5 (Cloth)

Books Published in original language:

- 1984 "Nominalisme pictural. Marcel Duchamp, la peinture et la modernité", Minuit, Paris, 1984. ISBN 2-7073-0687-8
- 1987 "Essais datés I, 1974–1986", Ed. de la différence, Paris, 1987. 341 pp.
- 1989 "Au nom de l'art. Pour une archéologie de la modernité", Minuit, Paris, 1989. ISBN 2-7073-1281-9
- 1989 "Résonances du readymade. Duchamp entre avant-garde et tradition" J. Chambon, 1989. 301 pp. ISBN 2-87711-190-3. Hachette littérature, 2006, 287 pp. ISBN 90-5544-315-8
- 1990 "Cousus de fil d'or. Beuys, Warhol, Klein, Duchamp" Villeurbanne, Art édition, 1990.
- 1991 "The Definitively Unfinished Marcel Duchamp ", (proceedings of the M.D. colloquium in Halifax, October 1987), Cambridge, editor, MIT Press, Mass.1991, 488 pp. ISBN 0-262-04117-0
- 1992 "Faire école" Les Presses du Réel, Paris, 1992. "Faire école (ou la refaire ?)", édition revue et augmentée, Les Presses du Réel, Paris, 2008. ISBN 978-2-84066-228-0
- 1995 "La Déposition" Dis Voir, Paris, 1995. ISBN 2-906571-46-6
- 1995 "Du nom au nous" Dis Voir, Paris, 1995 124 pp. ISBN 2-906571-49-0
- 1996 "Clément Greenberg entre les Lignes" Dis Voir, Paris, 1996. ISBN 2-906571-45-8
- 1996 "Kant after Duchamp ", Cambridge, MIT Press, Mass., 1996, 484 pp.
- 2000 "Voici, 100 ans d'art contemporain" Ludion, Gand, 2000, 303 pp. ISBN 90-5544-315-8. Réédition augmentée, Gand, Ludion, 2001, 320 pp. ISBN 90-5544-367-0.
- 2003 "Sylvie Eyberg / Valérie Mannaerts" (cat. exp. du pavillon belge à la Biennale de Venise, bil. fr.-angl.), Bruxelles, Yves Gevaert, 2003, 200 pp.
- 2003 "Lichaam / Beeld / Vlees", Bruxelles, editor Yves Gevaert, 2003, 200 pp.
- 2003 "Vlees / Huid / Kleur", Gand, editor, Sint-Lucas Beeldende Kunst, 2004, 202 pp.
- 2005 "Kleur / Blik / Ding", Gand, editor, Sint-Lucas Beeldende Kunst, 2005, 258 pp.

Books Published in original language, together:

- 2004 "La peinture de Manet", Michel Foucault; suivi de "Michel Foucault, un regard", ss. dir. Maryvonne Saison : Dominique Chateau, Thierry de Duve, Claude Imbert. Seuil, Paris, 2004. 176 pp. ISBN 2-02-058537-5
- "Jeff Wall" Thierry de Duve, Arielle Pélenc, Boris Groys, Jean-François Chevrier, Phaidon, Collection: Artistes contemporains, 2006. 212 pp. ISBN 0-7148-9675-6
- "L'art sans sujet ?" Marie-Claire Ropars, Mauro Carbone, Michel Costantini, Thierry de Duve. Presses Universitaires de Vincennes, Paris, 2008, 168 pp. ISBN 978-2-84292-206-1
- "Jeff Wall - L'édition complète" Mark Lewis, Thierry de Duve, Boris Groys, Jean-François Chevrier, Phaidon, 2010, 278 pp. ISBN 978-0-7148-5908-8
