= Stan Douglas =

Canadian artist (born 1960)

Stan Douglas OC
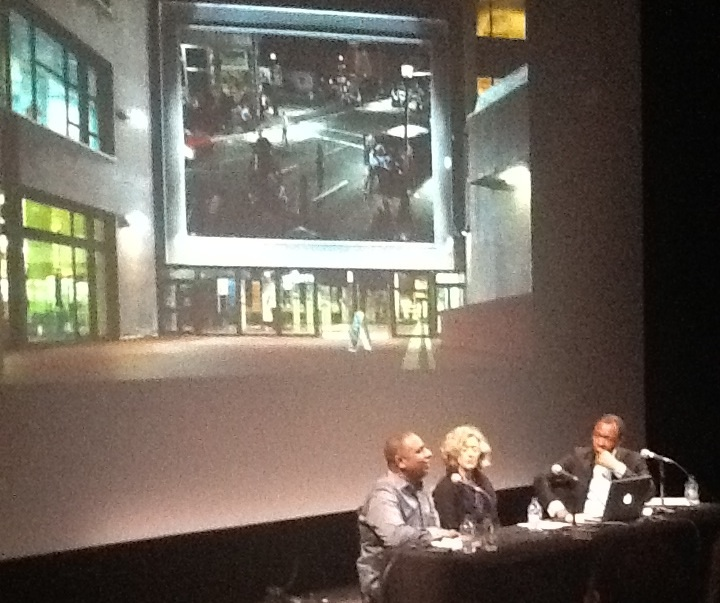
- Stan Douglas, Christine Ross and Okwui Enwezor at Musée d'art contemporain de Montréal
- Born: October 11, 1960 (age 65); Vancouver, British Columbia, Canada
- Known for: Installation artist, photographer
- Notable work: Win, Place or Show, 1998
- Movement: Vancouver School
- Awards: Hnatyshyn Foundation Visual Arts Award, 2007; Bell Award in Video Art, 2008; Infinity Award for Art from the International Center of Photography

Stan Douglas OC (born October 11, 1960) is a Canadian artist based in Vancouver, British Columbia.

Since the late 1980s, he has created works in film and photography as well as theatre productions and other multidisciplinary projects that investigate the parameters of their respective mediums. His ongoing inquiry into technology's role in image making, and how those mediations infiltrate and shape collective memory, has resulted in works that are at once specific in their historical and cultural references and broadly accessible.

He has exhibited internationally, including Documenta IX, 1992, Documenta X, 1997, Documenta XI, 2002 and the Venice Biennale in 1990, 2001, 2005 and 2019. Douglas was chosen to represent Canada in the 2022 Venice Biennale.

Art collector Friedrich Christian Flick, in the foreword to the Stan Douglas monograph, describes Douglas as "a critical analysis of our social reality. Samuel Beckett and Marcel Proust, E.T.A. Hoffmann and the Brothers Grimm, blues and free jazz, television and Hollywood, Karl Marx and Sigmund Freud haunt the uncanny montages of the Canadian artist."

== Background ==
Stan Douglas was born in 1960 in Vancouver, where he currently lives and works. Educated at the Emily Carr University of Art and Design in Vancouver, Douglas has exhibited widely since his first solo show in 1981. Among numerous group exhibitions, Douglas was included in the 1995 Carnegie International, the 1995 Whitney Biennial, the 1997 Skulptur Projekte Münster and Documenta X in Kassel. In 2007, Douglas was the recipient of the inaugural Hnatyshyn Foundation Visual Arts Award, a $25,000 prize for excellence in Canadian visual arts presented by Gerda Hnatyshyn president and chair of the board of The Hnatyshyn Foundation. In 2008 he was awarded the Bell Award in Video Art. Douglas is represented by David Zwirner, New York and Victoria Miro Gallery, London. A survey of his recent work, Stan Douglas: Mise en scène, traveled Europe from 2013 until the end of 2015. Between 2004 and 2006, he was a professor at Universität der Künste Berlin and since 2009 has been a member of the Core Faculty in the Graduate Art Department of Art Center College of Design.

== Themes ==
=== Modernism ===
Video still of Win, Place or Show (1998) which explores the modernist idea of urban renewal

Douglas' work reflects the technical and social aspects of mass media, and since the late 1980s has been influenced by the work of Samuel Beckett. Also of concern is both modernism as a theoretical concept and modernity as it has affected North American urbanism since World War II.

=== Politics and race ===
Douglas' work only touches on race directly in a few instances, such as the short video I'm Not Gary (1991). This interpretation of race is important, as the brief narrative involves a white man mistaking a black man for a different black man named Gary, for writer Lisa Coulthard, this is part of a larger investigation of racism as part of imperialism and cultural invisibility. For Coulthard, the lack of mention of race in works that feature only white performers troubles any racial reading of Douglas' work. In a great deal of Douglas' works, class rather than race is the key element. Having grown up in a largely white middle-class neighbourhood in Vancouver, race was only an issue of invisibility rather than civil rights for Douglas.

=== Jazz and blues ===
Although race as a theme is often not a central or obvious concern of Douglas, his own identity as a Black-Canadian is often addressed through his use of music and in particular, musical idioms associated with African-American culture, such as blues and jazz. In particular, Douglas points to the cultural prejudices which associate the "primitive" with black music, while the European musical tradition is positioned as "high culture". This binary between primitive and civilized is further complicated when considering jazz and its position as both "race music" but also highly cultured and in particular the European embracing of jazz as high art.

An early work, Deux Devises (1983), presents a projection of text, the lyrics of 19th century composer Charles Gounod's song "O ma belle, ma rebelle." A recording of Robert Johnson's "Preaching Blues" is played, with accompanying images of Douglas phonetically mouthing the words to the song, out of sync with the recording. The pairing of the safe salon music of Gounod, and the raw sounds of Johnson, points to the typical prejudice which validates and promotes the supposed seriousness of European music. Where Johnson's words are anguished, Gounod's are safe and comfortable.

Douglas' use of jazz is a more direct response to complex attitudes towards African-American music. Exhibited for the first time at documenta 9 in 1992, Hors-champs (meaning "off-screen") is a video installation that addresses the political context of free jazz in the 1960s, as an extension of black consciousness and is one of his few works to directly address race.

Four American musicians, George E. Lewis (trombone), Douglas Ewart (saxophone), Kent Carter (bass) and Oliver Johnson (drums) who lived in France during the free jazz period in the 1960s, improvise Albert Ayler's 1965 composition "Spirits Rejoice.". Free jazz often found a larger audience in Europe and was associated with politics and in particular in France where it was utilized by the French Communist Party during May 1968.

The music is in four parts, a gospel melody, an attenuated call and response, a heraldic fanfare and "La Marseillaise." Shot in the style of 1960s French television program and using period technology, the work is projected onto a screen, verso and recto. On one side is the "broadcast" version, a montage taken from two cameras, what would be chosen to be transmitted to the home audience. The other side shows the raw footage, the images not meant for public viewing, what was edited out. The two sides of the screen present a complete document of the performance, one in which the viewer must negotiate, depicting the "authorized" version but also the conditions of its production. What is being emphasized is a contrast between the banality of television and the radical programming that was featured at the time.

Luanda-Kinshasa runs for more than six hours. Its title points directly to the origins and history of jazz in Africa. Marking the first time the artist has filmed on location in New York, however, the setting is a reimagined Manhattan milieu in the 1970s, namely the CBS 30th Street Studio. Featuring a band of professional musicians improvising together, Luanda-Kinshasa is the documentation of a fictitious recording at the famed studio. Although Douglas plants subtle period details in clothes, wall posters and cigarette brands, all attention is on the band — which includes among its 10 instrumentalists the Senegalese drummer Abdou Mboup, the Indian tabla player Nitin Mitta, and the American drummer Kimberly Thompson — and on the music being made.

=== Cinema ===
As a Vancouver artist getting his start in the 1980s and using lens-based media, Stan Douglas is often associated with the Vancouver School of photoconceptualism. His use of video and film, in addition to photography, as well as his specific interests in cinematic history, forms and spatial concerns set him apart from peers such as Jeff Wall.

Douglas has reworked films such as Alfred Hitchcock's Marnie (1964), Dario Argento's Suspiria (1977) and Orson Welles's Journey into Fear (1943) exploring "the parameters, functions and limits of cinematic adaptation." His works reference the originals but also distance the newer works through manipulation of the texts, often employing loops and editing techniques to "defamiliarize" the originals

Subject to a Film: Marnie is a re-creation of the robbery scene from Hitchcock's 1964 film. In his 1995 Art in America review Tom Eccles describes the work as "creating the effect of a recurring nightmare" as the titular character, rather than escaping is "caught in the film loop, forever trapped within the confines of the office." Douglas updates the office

with computers replacing typewriters and carpet for '50s linoleum. This version is shot in black and white, which gives it the feel of a recollected experience, and Douglas has slowed the action, bringing Marnie's inherent voyeurism into focus. One can almost sense the craning neck of the filmmaker. Marnie's well-rehearsed actions of walking to the washroom, returning to the desk and turning the safe's combination dial are carefully played out – but as her gloved hand runs through the combination, the film cuts back to the opening shot, panning out to a general view of the office where the workers once again prepare to leave for the day.

Inconsolable Memories (2005) is based on Tomas Gutierrez Alea's film Memorias del subdesarrollo (Memories of Underdevelopment) from 1968, updated to include references to the Mariel boatlift of 1980. Douglas's installation consists of a 16mm projection with a photographic series of contemporary Havana, Cuba. The film is looped and when presented as an installation the film and photographs create a sense of repetition, a common feature of Douglas' work. Rather than strictly working from Alea's film in the manner Douglas worked from Hitchcock's Marnie, Inconsolable Memories plays with the layers of its various sources (Cuba in the 1960s, the 1980s and the present). Some of the photographs reference the locations used in the original Alea film tying together the themes of history and memory. At issue is the utopian promise of the Cuban revolution and its decline, and as well, the parallel Cold War events of the Cuban Missile Crisis of 1962 (examined in Alea's film) and the boatlift of 1980.

=== Samuel Beckett ===
Douglas has long been interested in the work of Samuel Beckett. In 1988 he curated Samuel Beckett: Teleplays, eight Beckett works for film and television. In 1991, Douglas produced Monodramas a series of short videos for television broadcasting, based on his studies of Beckett's teleplays. Developed for television, these 30- to 60-second video works were broadcast nightly in British Columbia in 1992 for three weeks. The short narratives "mimic television's editing techniques" and when the videos were aired during the regular commercial breaks, viewers called the station to ask what was being sold. Douglas' first project for television, Television Spots (1987–88) consisted of twelve were broadcast in Saskatoon and Ottawa during regular programming and featured short, banal scenes in open-ended narratives. An early video work, Mime (the second part of Deux Devises, 1983) consisted of a close-up of Douglas' mouth in the shape of phonemes, which are then edited to sync up with the song "Preachin' Blues" by Robert Johnson. Douglas was not aware of Beckett's own work Not I, a disembodied mouth in a black screen. In a lecture given at YYZ Artists' Outlet in Toronto, Douglas commented that the choice of a blues song was

a fairly personal one, derived in a way from my experience of being black in a predominantly white culture, having very little contact with black American culture, but at the same time being expected to represent that to people-both to people who were antagonistically racist and to liberal types. So what you have is my image not quite synching up or relating to a very archetypal black figure, Robert Johnson.

Douglas began to study Beckett's works and his next video work Panoramic Rotunda (1985) came from misremembering a line from Beckett's Fizzle No. 7. The repetition and seemingly endless loops of the same narrative in Win, Place or Show recalls Beckett's use of repetition to point to but also undermine the "sameness" of reality. The absurdity of the forever repeating narrative, of the two protagonists in an endless loop, always the same words but from different points of reference is an allusion to Vladimir and Estragon in Waiting for Godot.

== Works ==
=== Early works 1983–1991 ===
Stan Douglas' works from the 1980s are concerned with obsolete media and their aesthetics. Lost time is a continuous element in his works. The installation Overture (1986) uses footage of a train journey through the Rocky Mountains shot between 1899 and 1901. The soundtrack consists of Vancouver writer Gerald Creede reading Douglas's reworking of various sentences taken from the opening section of Marcel Proust's A la recherche de temps perdu. For writer Peter Culley, writing about two of Douglas' works in 1986,

Douglas situates Overture in the historical moment that the beginnings of film share with the end of the novel, when Proust's faith in the tantalizing structures of his great predecessors, Balzac and Wagner, was being undermined by the perceptive discontinuities that film helped to bring about.

In Onomatopoeia (1985–1986), a screen hangs over spot-lit upright player piano. The piano plays bars from Beethoven's Piano Sonata No. 32, Opus 111. Triggered by punctuations on the piano scroll, images of an empty textile factory are projected above the piano. The perforated scrolls that were used to programme weaving into fabric patterns, echo the player piano scrolls. The images are of a textile mill near the artist's home and specifically that section of the mill employing the punch cards that determine the different patterns of weave design. The punch cards are part of the same type of technology as the player piano, which to Culley "sets up a simultaneity of subject which the work immediately begins to subvert; image and music constantly move in and out of precise synchronization, keeping the audience at a constant level of anxious anticipation."

Douglas's Monodramas are ten 30- to 60-second videos from 1991, conceived as interventions into commercial television, broadcast nightly in British Columbia for three weeks in 1992. These short narratives, set in bleak suburban locations, mimic television's editing techniques, with plots dealing often mundane situations and with a slight twist at the end. The segment "I'm Not Gary" is set in a nondescript industrial strip. A white man passes a second man who is black, calling out to him "Gary?" and is visibly irritated at not being acknowledged. Finally, the second man turns to him, replying, "I'm not Gary." For writer Lisa Coulthard, race is the interpretive framework, because for the white man in the video, "his interlocutor is simply a black man, interchangeable with any other for example and clearly interchangeable with Gary."

=== Installations ===
A key element in a number of Douglas' installations is the use of time and in particular, an investigation into slowed-down time or stillness. His 1995 installation Der Sandmann, based on E.T.A. Hoffmann's original 1816 short story and Sigmund Freud's 1919 essay "The Uncanny", consists of a double projection where the film is literally split down the middle and reassembled so the two sides are slightly out of sync. This creates a "temporal gap", disrupting the sense of unity so crucial to modernism, so that "everything is deferred and delayed."

Douglas' 1998 installation Win, Place or Show is shot in the style of the late-1960s CBC drama The Client, noted for its gritty style, long takes and lack of establishing shots. Set in 1950s Vancouver in the Strathcona redevelopment, the installation explores the modernist notion of urban renewal with the demolition of existing architecture in favour of grids of apartment blocks. Two men share a dormitory room on a rainy day off from their blue-collar jobs. The conversation flares up during a discussion of the day's horse races and the 6 minute filmed loop is repeated from different angles on a split screen, each cycle presenting ever-changing configurations of point-of-view. The takes are edited together in real time by a computer during the exhibition, generating an almost endless series of montages.

His 2014 interactive installation, Circa 1948 was co-produced by the National Film Board of Canada, and premiered in April at the Tribeca Film Festival's Storyscapes section. Douglas also created the stage play Helen Lawrence with Chris Haddock, which shares graphics, story and characters with Circa 1948.

== Venice Biennale ==
The National Gallery of Canada chose Douglas to represent Canada in the 2021 Venice Biennale. Douglas has exhibited at the Venice Biennale previously, most recently in 2019 where he debuted the work the two-channel video installation Doppelgänger (2019), "set in an alternate present in which a solitary astronaut and her other-world counterpart each arrives 'home' to find that everything is the reverse of what she once knew. Enacted simultaneously on two screens, the work's structure suggested the possibility of coexisting experiences and realities." The jury, including National Gallery director Sasha Suda and chief curator Kitty Scott, picked Douglas citing "the relevance of his work to the global debates taking place in Venice."

== Catalogues ==
- Douglas, Stan and Philip Monk. Stan Douglas. Cologne: Friedrich Christian Flick Collection and DuMont, 2006. ISBN 3-8321-7730-2
- Douglas, Stan and Michael Turner. Journey into fear. London: Serpentine Gallery, 2002. ISBN 3-88375-554-0
- Douglas, Stan and Reid Shier, ed. Stan Douglas: Every Building on 100 West Hastings. Vancouver: Arsenal Pulp Press, Contemporary Art Gallery, 2002. ISBN 978-1-55152-135-0
- Douglas, Stan, Boris Groys, Isabel Zürcher, Peter Pakesch and Terence Dick. Stan Douglas: Le Détroit. Basel: Kunsthalle Basel, 2001. ISBN 3-7965-1710-2
- Douglas, Stan. Stan Douglas. Toronto: Macdonald Stewart Art Centre, 1994. ISBN 0-920810-56-X
- Douglas, Stan and Christine VanAssche. Stan Douglas. Paris: Centre Georges Pompidou, 1993. ISBN 2-85850-747-3
- Fischer, Barbara and Stan Douglas. Perspective 87: Stan Douglas. Toronto: Art Gallery of Ontario, 1987. ISBN 0-919777-52-X

== Solo exhibitions ==
- Serpentine Gallery, London (2002)
- Kestner Gesellschaft, Hanover (2004)
- Studio Museum in Harlem, New York (2005)
- Staatsgalerie Stuttgart and Württembergischer Kunstverein, Stuttgart (2007)
- The Power Plant, Toronto (2011)
- Minneapolis Institute of Arts, Minnesota (2012)
- Fruitmarket Gallery, Edinburgh (2014–2015)
- Irish Museum of Modern Art, Dublin (2015)
- Hessel Museum of Art, Annandale-on-Hudson, N.Y. (2025)

== Awards ==
- 2007: Hnatyshyn Foundation Visual Arts Award
- 2008: Bell Award in Video Art
- 2012: Infinity Award for Art from the International Center of Photography, New York
- 2013: Scotiabank Photography Award
- 2016: Hasselblad Award
- 2019: Audain Prize for the Visual Arts
- 2024: Officer of the Order of Canada

== Public collections ==
- Art Gallery of Ontario, Toronto
- Centre Georges Pompidou, Paris
- Israel Museum, Jerusalem
- Museum of Contemporary Art, Chicago
- Museum of Modern Art, New York
- National Gallery of Canada, Ottawa
- San Francisco Museum of Modern Art
- Solomon R. Guggenheim Museum, New York
- Tate Gallery, London
- Vancouver Art Gallery
- Walker Art Center, Minneapolis, Minnesota
