= Vancouver School =

Grouping of Canadian artists

The Vancouver School of conceptual or post-conceptual photography (often referred to as photoconceptualism) is a loose term applied to a grouping of artists from Vancouver starting in the 1980s. Critics and curators began writing about artists reacting to both older conceptual art practices and mass media by countering with "photographs of high intensity and complex content that probed, obliquely or directly, the social force of imagery." No formal "school" exists and the grouping remains both informal and often controversial even amongst the artists themselves, who often resist the term. Artists associated with the term include Vikky Alexander, Roy Arden, Ken Lum, Jeff Wall, Ian Wallace, Stan Douglas and Rodney Graham.

== History ==
In the early 1980s an attempt at what William Wood refers to as a "re-branding" of Vancouver and a desire for a larger recognition within Canada and internationally, the Vancouver School designation functioned to present Vancouver art to the larger international market.

== Key works ==
Mimic (1982)

Jeff Wall's Mimic (1982) typifies his cinematographic style and according to art historian Michael Fried "characteristic of Wall's engagement in his art of the 1980s with social issues". A 198 × 226 cm. colour transparency, it shows a white couple and an Asian man walking towards the camera. The sidewalk, flanked by parked cars and residential and light-industrial buildings, suggests a North American industrial suburb. The woman is wearing red shorts and a white top displaying her midriff; her bearded, unkempt boyfriend wears a denim vest. The Asian man is casual but well-dressed in comparison, in a collared shirt and slacks. As the couple overtake the man, the boyfriend makes an ambiguous but apparently obscene and racist gesture, holding his upraised middle finger close to the corner of his eye, "slanting" his eye in mockery of the Asian man's eyes. The picture resembles a candid shot that captures the moment and its implicit social tensions, but is actually a recreation of an exchange witnessed by the artist.

Win, Place or Show (1998) installation view

Stan Douglas' 1998 video installation Win, Place or Show is shot in the style of the late-1960s CBC drama The Client, noted for its gritty style, long takes and lack of establishing shots. Set in 1950s Vancouver in the Strathcona redevelopment, the installation explores the modernist notion of urban renewal with the demolition of existing architecture in favour of grids of apartment blocks. Two men share a dormitory room on a rainy day off from their blue-collar jobs. The conversation flares up during a discussion of the day's horse races, and the 6-minute filmed loop is repeated from different angles on a split screen, each cycle presenting ever-changing configurations of point of view. The takes are edited together in real time by a computer during the exhibition, generating an almost endless series of montages.

In 1994 Rodney Graham began a series of films and videos in which he himself appears as the principal character: Halcion Sleep (1994), Vexation Island (1997) (shown at Canadian pavilion of the 1997 Venice Biennale) and How I Became a Ramblin’ Man (1999). The Phonokinetoscope (2002) reflects Graham’s engagement both with the origins of cinema and its eventual demise. Graham takes up a prototype by Thomas Edison and puts forward an argument for the relation between sound and image in film. In Rheinmetall/Victoria 8 (2003), two increasingly obsolete technologies, the typewriter and film projector, face off against one another—with the latter projecting a film of the former.

== Selected exhibitions ==
- "Light Years: The Phil Lind Gift", Art Gallery of Ontario, Toronto, 2025, featuring works by Stan Douglas, Rodney Graham, Ron Terada and Jeff Wall. This exhibition was accompanied by a book/catalogue by the curator of the show Adam Welch.

== See also ==
- Düsseldorf School of Photography
