= Roy Arden =

Canadian artist (born 1957)

- Born: 1957 (age 68–69); Vancouver, British Columbia, Canada
- Education: BA Emily Carr College of Art and Design (1982); MA University of British Columbia (1990)

Roy Arden (born 1957) is an artist who is a member of the Vancouver School. He creates sculpture from found objects, oil paintings, graphite drawings and collage, and curates and writes on contemporary art.

== Career ==
Arden graduated from Emily Carr College of Art and Design with a bachelor's degree in photography and interdisciplinary studies in 1982 and with an M.A. from the University of British Columbia in 1990. In the early part of his career, Arden made straightforward Cibachrome images of the contemporary urban scene which he called "Fragments", then made what he called "meta-photography", archival image diptychs. In the 1990s, he made colour photographs of what he termed the "landscape of economy" that depicted the city of Vancouver and its rapid growth.

Around 1999, Arden changed from colour to black-and-white photography, focusing again on the urban wasteland in Vancouver. In 2000, he began to produce videos.

His videos, Juggernaut (2000), Citizen (2000), and Supernatural (2006), were shown at Ikon Gallery, Birmingham in 2006 in his solo exhibition there, along with his photographs from 1985 on. His project "The World as Will and Representation – Archive (2007)", a slide show of his archive of 28,000 images Internet-based, can be viewed at www.royarden.com.

Arden has been exhibiting since the late 1970S. He has had solo exhibitions at the Ikon Gallery, Birmingham (2006); Galerie Tanit, Munich (2005 and 2006); and a mid-career show at the Vancouver Art Gallery (2007). His work has also had been included in exhibitions at the Kunstmuseum Basel, and the Museum of Modern Art, Antwerp (Museum van Hedendaagse Kunst). It is in the collection of the Museum of Modern Art, New York – it was featured in their inaugural exhibition after their expansion in 2005 - besides being included in the collections of major museums in Canada, Europe and the U.S.A. such as the Centre Pompidou in Paris, the Hammer Museum in Los Angeles, the Musée d'art contemporain de Montréal, the Museu d'Art Contemporani de Barcelona, the Albright-Knox Art Gallery in Buffalo the Art Gallery of Ontario and the National Gallery of Canada in Ottawa. He is represented by Monte Clark Gallery in Vancouver.

He has been an instructor in the photography studio department at the Emily Carr University of Art and Design and the University of British Columbia. He has also been a guest teacher at art academies in Finland, Germany, and Switzerland. Arden has also been involved in curating as a curator - he curated a show on photography at Monte Clark Gallery in 1999 - and as a collaborator and published critical texts on contemporary art for catalogues and art magazines.

== Selected exhibitions ==
- 2006 - Roy Arden, Ikon Gallery, Birmingham, United Kingdom
- 2007 - Fragments, Vancouver Art Gallery, Vancouver, Canada
- 2009 - People of British Columbia, Monte Clark Gallery, Vancouver, Canada
- 2011 - From Here On, Rencontres d'Arles, Arles, France
- 2012 - Vox, Monte Clark Gallery, Vancouver, Canada
- 2015 - Roy Arden Exhibition, Le Mois De La Photo, Montreal, Quebec

== Publications ==
- Arden, Roy; Roelstraete, Dieter; Ferguson, Russell (2007). Roy Arden: Against The Day. Vancouver: Douglas & McIntyre and Vancouver Art Gallery.
