= Ilfochrome =

Photo printing process

Ilfochrome (also commonly known as Cibachrome) is a dye destruction positive-to-positive photographic process used for the reproduction of film transparencies on photographic paper. The prints are made on a dimensionally stable polyester base as opposed to traditional paper base. Since it uses 13 layers of azo dyes sealed in a polyester base, the print will not fade, discolour, or deteriorate for an extended time. Accelerated aging tests conducted by Henry Wilhelm rated the process as producing prints which, framed under glass, would last for 29 years before color shifts could be detected. Characteristics of Ilfochrome prints are image clarity, color purity, and being an archival process able to produce critical accuracy to the original transparency.

== History ==
Dr. Bela Gaspar created Gasparcolor, the dye bleach process upon which the Cibachrome process was originally based. It was considered vital to the war effort in the 1940s. Gaspar turned down many offers to sell the rights to his process and after he died, Paul Dreyfus, who was the chemist and technician for Gaspar, went to work for CIBA AG. When the patents ran out, he developed the process for Cibachrome. In the 1960s, the Cibachrome process was originally engineered by the Ciba Geigy Corporation of Switzerland. Ciba acquired Ilford in 1969, and sold it to International Paper in 1989; in 1992 the product was renamed to "Ilfochrome". Colloquially, however the process is still referred to as "Cibachrome".

Before 2004 Ilford Ltd had two main manufacturing sites: Mobberley in the UK, where most traditional products were made, and Fribourg (Freiburg) in Switzerland, where Ilfochrome and Ilfocolor papers were made, as well as the inkjet papers. The UK side was subject to a management buyout, and the Swiss operation (Ilford Imaging Switzerland GmbH) was sold to the Japanese Oji paper group in 2005 and to Paradigm Global Partners LLP in 2010. The Swiss plant retained the Ilford name, while the UK operation was inaugurated under the name HARMAN, taken from the name of the founder of the original Britannia Works. Ilford Photo HARMAN Technology Ltd can still use the Ilford brandname and logo under license on previously existing products, while new products will carry the Harman name.

In 2012, Ilford announced its final production run of Ilfochrome Classic in response to declining market demand attributed to the expanding popularity of digital image making.

== Advantages ==
The composition of the emulsion used in Ilfochrome prints is responsible for color purity, image clarity, and archival permanence. Azo dyes, which provide stable vivid colors, are embedded in the Ilfochrome emulsion and bleached out in processing. Since the dyes are in the emulsion rather than formed from couplers in the chemistry, the image is also much sharper and clearer because the dyes create an anti-light-scattering layer which keeps the image from being diffused when viewed. As the azo dyes are far more stable than chromogenic dyes, prints made by this process are of archival quality and galleries and art collectors report they do not fade in normal light.

== Use directly in camera ==
An alternative use of Ilfochrome was for image capture directly inside a large format or ultra large format camera. This created a unique original positive photograph, in which the subject is reversed left-right unless a mirror or prism was used in front of the camera lens. A much longer exposure was required than with sheet films or plates designed for use in a camera. The procedure thus resembled the slow daguerreotype and ambrotype direct positive black-and-white processes used in the 1850s.

== Sources ==
- Coote, Jack H. (1978). The FOCALGUIDE to Cibachrome. London: Focal Press. ISBN 0-240-50981-1.
- Ilford Cibachrome-A. Switzerland: Ilford. MAN 03 GB.
- Peres, Michael R. (2007). "Silver Dye-Bleach Photography". Focal encyclopedia of photography (4th ed.). Focal Press. p. 709. ISBN 978-0-240-80740-9.
