= Hoch =

Hoch and Höch are surnames. Notable people with these surnames include:

- Adolf Hoch (1910–1992), Austrian architect
- August Hoch (1868–1919), Swiss-born American psychiatrist
- Beverly Hoch (born 1951), American opera singer
- Clemens Hoch (born 1978), German politician (SPD)
- Corinne Hoch, American historian and clubwoman
- Daniel Hoch (born 1979), Swedish soccer player
- Daniel K. Hoch (1866-1960), American politician
- Danny Hoch (born 1970), American actor and writer
- Deborah Hoch-Pfleiderer (1860–1945), missionary wife in India
- Edward D. Hoch (1930–2008), American writer
- Edward W. Hoch (1849–1925), American politician
- Eva-Maria Hoch (born 1984), Austrian tennis player
- Gebhard Hoch (1943–2000), Liechtenstein politician
- Gottfried Höch (1800–1872), German official
- Hannah Höch (1889–1978), German artist
- Harry Hoch (1887–1981), American baseball player
- Heinrich Theodor Höch (1845–1905), German businessman
- Homer Hoch (1879–1949), American politician
- James Hoch (microbiologist), microbiologist
- James Hoch (poet) (born 1967), American poet
- Johann Otto Hoch (1855–1906), German-born American murderer
- Joseph Hoch (1815–1874), German lawyer
- Lambert Anthony Hoch (1903–1990), American bishop
- Matthew Hoch (born 1975), American academic
- Preben Hoch (1925–2014), Danish rower
- Scott Hoch (born 1955), American golfer
- Winton C. Hoch (1905–1979), American cinematographer
- Robert Maxwell (born Ján Ludvík Hyman Binyamin Hoch; 1923–1991), British media proprietor and politician
- Xaver Hoch (born 1947), Liechtenstein politician

== See also ==
- Hock (disambiguation)
- Hooch (disambiguation)
