= AIT =

AIT or Ait may refer to:

== Places ==
- Ait, a small island found in the middle of a river or lake
- Friesoythe, a town in Germany, known in Saterland Frisian name as Ait or Äit
- Ait, Uttar Pradesh, a town in India

== Government ==
- American Institute in Taiwan, representative office of the U.S. in Taiwan
- Asylum and Immigration Tribunal, a former British UK tribunal

== Education ==
=== India ===
- Acharya Institute of Technology, in Bangalore
- Adichunchanagiri Institute of Technology, in Karnataka
- Adithya Institute of Technology, in Coimbatore
- Army Institute of Technology, in Pune

=== United States ===
- Advanced Individual Training, the second stage of United States Army Basic Training
- Aeromedical Isolation Team, of the US Army Medical Research Institute of Infectious Diseases
- Academy for Information Technology, a high school in Scotch Plains, New Jersey

=== Elsewhere ===
- Accra Institute of Technology, in Ghana
- Aichi Institute of Technology, in Toyota, Japan
- Aligarh Institute of Technology, in Karachi, Pakistan
- Aquincum Institute of Technology, a study abroad opportunity for North American undergraduates in Budapest, Hungary
- Asian Institute of Technology, in Pathum Thani, Thailand
- Athlone Institute of Technology, in Ireland
- Auckland University of Technology, formerly Auckland Institute of Technology, in New Zealand

== Companies ==
- Africa Independent Television, a Nigerian broadcaster
- Ameritech, a former Regional Bell Operating Company that had NYSE ticker symbol AIT
- Applied Industrial Technologies, American distributor of bearings, adhesives and sealants
- Autel Intelligent Technology, a Chinese electric vehicle manufacturer

== Organizations ==
- Agency for Instructional Technology, American non-profit distributor of educational TV programs
- Alliance Internationale de Tourisme, an international federation of motoring organisations
- Arts Initiative Tokyo, a non-profit collective of curators and art administrators
- Austrian Institute of Technology, a federal research facility in Austria

== Other uses ==
- Advanced Imaging Technology, airport security screening technology
- Advanced Intelligent Tape, a former magnetic tape data storage format
- Agreement on Internal Trade, a trade agreement between Canadian governments
- Algorithmic information theory, a subfield of information theory and computer science
- Amiodarone induced thyrotoxicosis, a drug induced medical condition
