= Albert Samreth =

Cambodian-American artist

- Born: 1987 (age 38–39); Los Angeles, California, United States
- Education: California Institute of the Arts
- Known for: Post-conceptual art
- Website: www.albertsamreth.com

Albert Samreth is a contemporary American artist living and working in México City and Phnom Penh. Samreth uses painting, sculpture, and film to explore collective memory, often privileging the perspective of non-human subjects such as plants, animals, objects, and phenomena.

== Biography ==
Samreth was born in 1987 in Los Angeles, California. Samreth's parents were refugees from Cambodia who settled in the United States after living in Thailand and the Philippines. He studied at the California Institute of the Arts (CalArts).

== Work ==
Samreth relocated to Phnom Penh, Cambodia in 2011, the capital of the country his parents lived in before fleeing the Khmer Rouge regime. There, the artist kept a studio in the White Building and had a practice of walking, including retracing the paths of historical events such as the Fall of Phnom Penh. Frieze describes Samreth’s practice as “minimal, impeccably produced and highly considered” in the tradition of “post-conceptualism.”

Samreth participated in the fourth Singapore Biennale and created the project The Voice (2013) in a special commission. The artist hired professional announcer Carolyn Hopkins to narrate his writings about public spaces in a piece of sound-art installed at the entryway of the Singapore Art Museum.

In 2014, Samreth spent a month living in Cherwon on the 38th parallel. There the artist worked with local teenagers to write a song and choreograph a dance routine in the style of K-POP that was performed atop his sculpture, Dancers On A Plane (2014). Organized by curator Sungjung Kim, the work, set against the landscape of the Korean DMZ and referencing the global spread of one aspect of contemporary South Korean culture, served as a reconsideration of the aesthetics of resistance to war and the movement for reunification.

Samreth has exhibited at institutions in Europe and Asia including Hamburger Bahnhof in Berlin, Germany, the Bétonsalon in Paris, the Asia Culture Center in Gwangju, South Korea, and the Bangkok Arts and Culture Center in Thailand. Samreth's work is held in the collection of the MAIIAM Contemporary Museum of Art in Chiang Mai.

== Recognition ==
In 2014, Samreth was awarded Artist in Residence at the Arts Initiative Tokyo (AIT) program in Shibuya-ku, Tokyo. Samreth was nominated for the Rema Hort Mann Foundation Emerging Artist Los Angeles grant, 2015. In 2018, Samreth’s science-fiction-documentary film One Lightyear on Earth (2018), was awarded the ACC Cinema Fund from the Asian Cultural Council for filmmakers “whom to entrust the creation of experimental new film works that go beyond current movie formats.”
