= Opernpassage =

Pedestrian underpass in Vienna, Austria

Coordinates: 48.2016°N 16.3693°E

Opernpassage

The Opernpassage (Opera passage) in the Inner City of Vienna is a Grade II listed pedestrian underpass under the ring road (Ringstraße). It was opened in 1955, a day before the re-opening of the nearby Vienna State Opera.

Designed by architect Adolf Hoch it has been a symbol of a modern spirit in architecture and urban planning. In the wake of the construction of the Karlsplatz station of the Vienna U-Bahn the Opernpassage was added to a network of underpasses spanning from the Secession Building to the eponymous Karlsplatz.

After more than 50 years the City of Vienna undertook a complete restoration of the structure, advised by the Federal Office for the Protection of Monuments in Austria. The passage was reopened on 17 September 2013, showing the original design of the round columns, the curved glass of the shop windows, and the chequerboard pattern of the floor.

The artwork Pi by Canadian artist Ken Lum is installed on the walls of the western branch of the pedestrian passage since 2006.

Location of the passages of the Karlsplatz metro station
