= Hock =

Hock may refer to:

- Hock (wine), a type of wine
- Hock (anatomy), part of an animal's leg
- To leave an item with a pawnbroker
- Hock (surname)
- Richard "Hock" Walsh (1948–1999), Canadian blues singer
- A type of wine bottle used primarily for German or Alsatian wine

== See also ==
- Hock Mountain, a summit in Washington state
- Hocktide or Hock tide, an English holiday consisting of Hock Monday and Hock Tuesday
