= Hoštka =

- Town
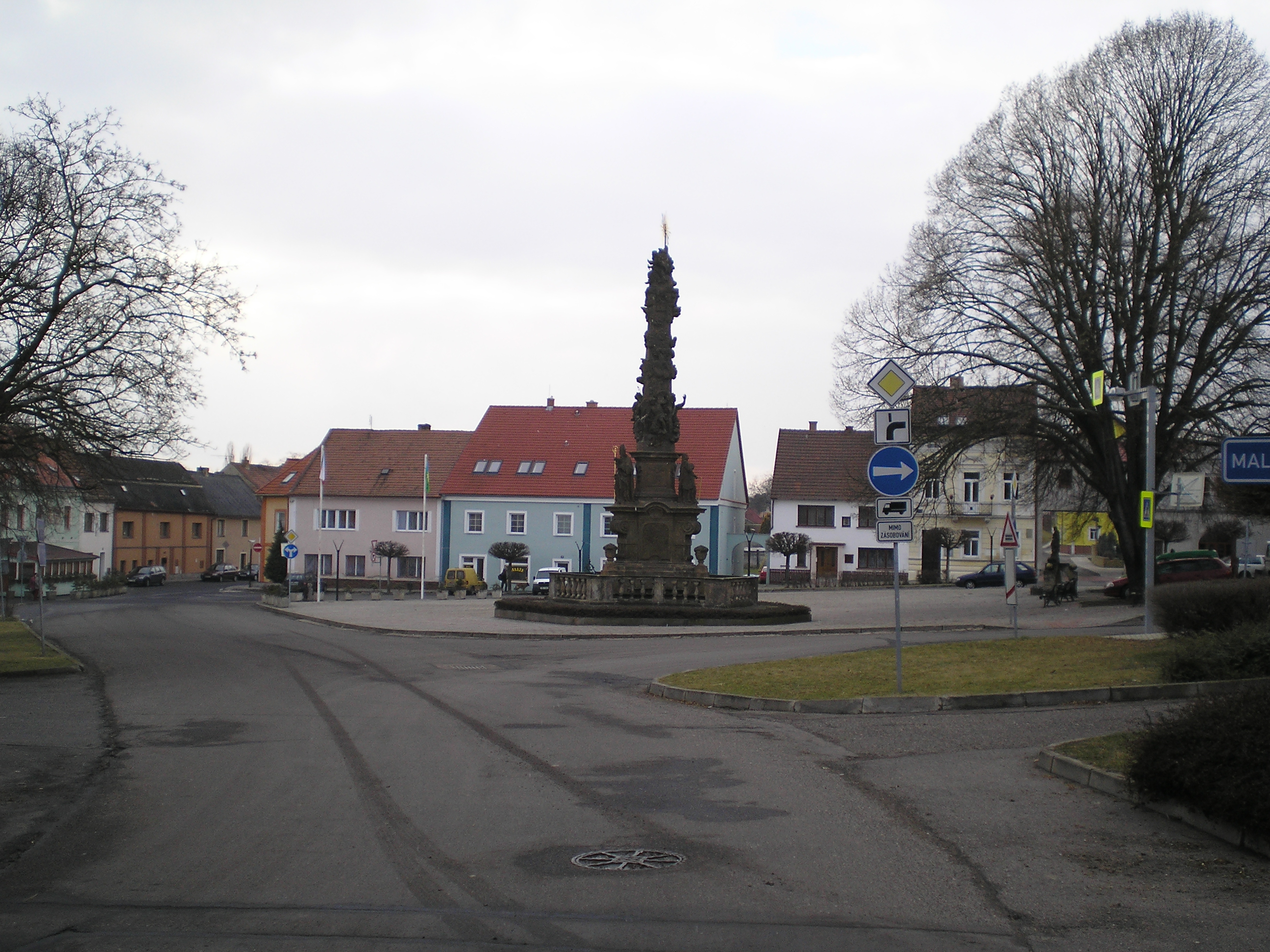
- Town square

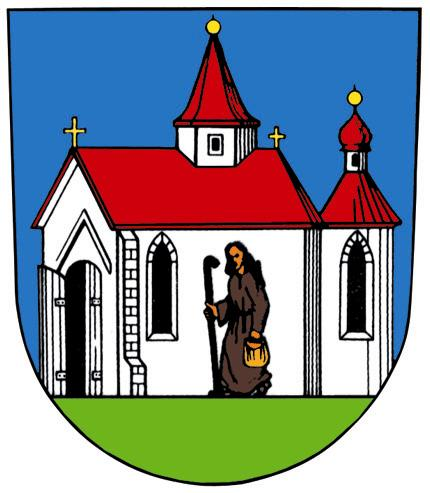
- Flag Coat of arms

- Location in the Czech Republic
- Coordinates: 50°29′13″N 14°20′1″E
- Country: Czech Republic
- Region: Ústí nad Labem
- District: Litoměřice
- First mentioned: 1266

Government
  - Mayor: Milan Konfršt

Area
  - Total: 18.80 km^{2} (7.26 sq mi)
- Elevation: 184 m (604 ft)

Population (2026-01-01)
  - Total: 1,764
  - Density: 93.83/km^{2} (243.0/sq mi)
- Time zone: UTC+1 (CET)
  - Summer (DST): UTC+2 (CEST)
- Postal code: 411 72
- Website: www.hostka.cz

Hoštka (Czech pronunciation: [ˈɦoʃtka]; German: Gastorf) is a town in Litoměřice District in the Ústí nad Labem Region of the Czech Republic. It has about 1,800 inhabitants. The town is located on the Obrtka Stream in the Ralsko Uplands.

Hoštka was founded in the 13th century at the latest and became a town in 1853. The main landmark is the Church of Saint Othmar.

== Administrative division ==
Hoštka consists of four municipal parts (in brackets population according to the 2021 census):

- Hoštka (836)
- Kochovice (605)
- Malešov (167)
- Velešice (99)

== Etymology ==
The name Hoštka was derived from the personal name Host, Hosta or Hošek.

== Geography ==
Hoštka is located about 15 kilometres (9 mi) southeast of Litoměřice and 28 km (17 mi) southeast of Ústí nad Labem. It lies in the Ralsko Uplands. The highest point is at 305 m (1,001 ft) above sea level. The Obrtka Stream flows through the town. The municipal territory is bordered by the Elbe River on the south.

== History ==
The first written mention of Hoštka is in a deed of King Ottokar II from 1266. Until the 1360s, it was owned by Mikuláš Srša and his descendants. During their rule, Hoštka developed and expanded. The next owner was the bishopric in Prague. In the second half of the 16th century, Hoštka developed rapidly, a paper mill was established here, and tolls were collected on the Elbe.

Development was interrupted by the Thirty Years' War, during which Hoštka was damaged, but after the war it prospered again and the population grew. Ethnic Germans prevailed over Czechs, but even their minority was numerous. In 1853, Hoštka was promoted to a town. From 1938 to 1945, it was annexed by Nazi Germany and administered as part of the Reichsgau Sudetenland. After World War II, the German-speaking population was expelled and partially replaced by Czechs.

== Demographics ==
Historical population

Year	Pop.	±%
1869	2,288	—
1880	2,389	+4.4%
1890	2,297	−3.9%
1900	2,168	−5.6%
1910	2,136	−1.5%

Year	Pop.	±%
1921	2,082	−2.5%
1930	2,157	+3.6%
1950	1,316	−39.0%
1961	1,266	−3.8%
1970	1,271	+0.4%

Year	Pop.	±%
1980	1,220	−4.0%
1991	1,187	−2.7%
2001	1,369	+15.3%
2011	1,618	+18.2%
2021	1,707	+5.5%

Source: Censuses

== Transport ==
Hoštka is located on the railway line Ústí nad Labem–Lysá nad Labem.

== Sights ==
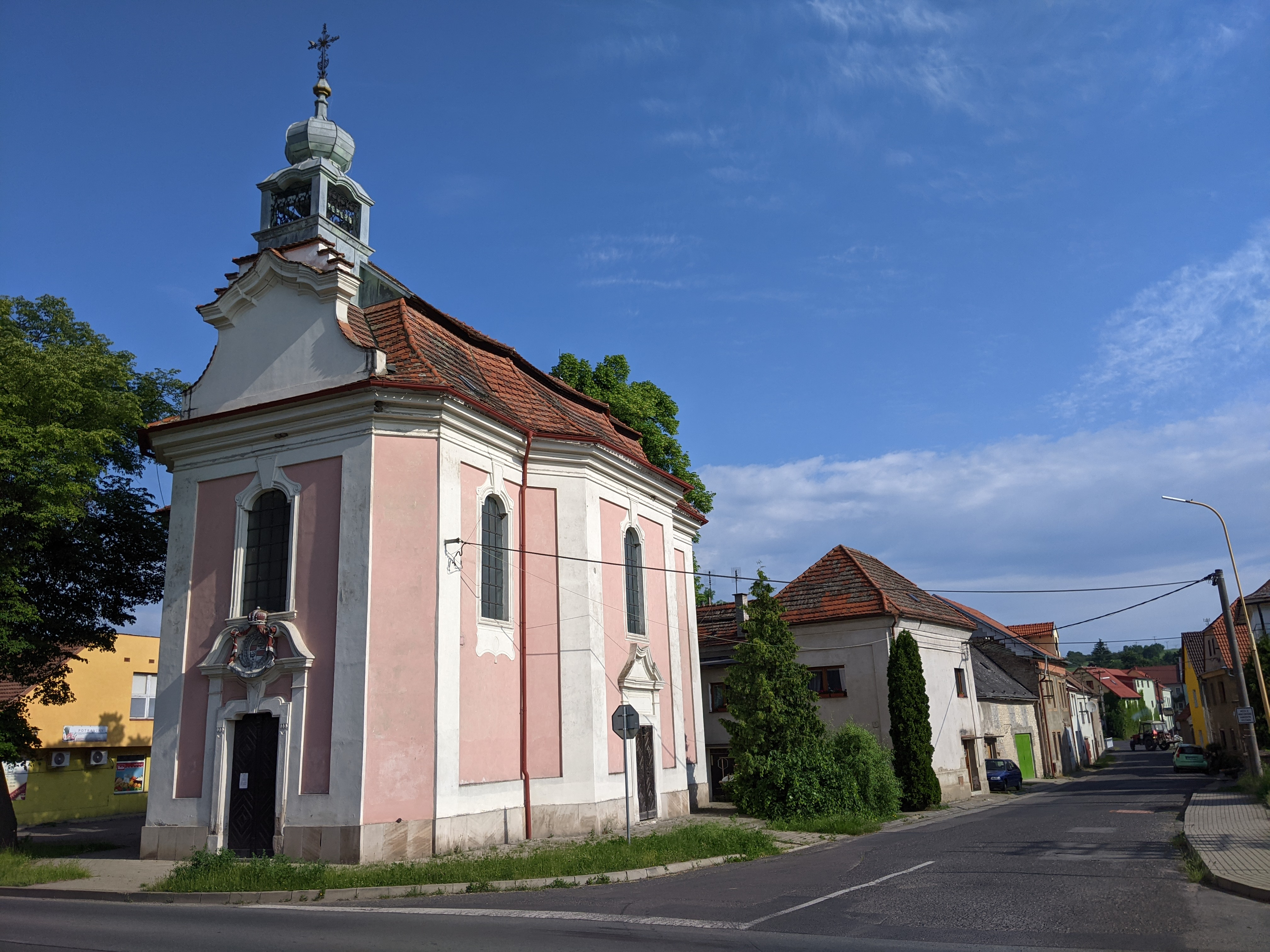
Chapel of the Assumption of the Virgin Mary

The main landmark of Hoštka is the Church of Saint Othmar. The originally Gothic church was built in the late 15th century and rebuilt in the early 18th century, but it preserved its Gothic core. It has a tall prismatic tower.

The Chapel of the Assumption of the Virgin Mary was built in the Baroque style in 1762. The Holy Trinity column on the town square is also in the Baroque style and dates from 1737.

== Notable people ==
- Johann Joseph Abert (1832–1915), German composer
