= James Hoch =

James Hoch may refer to:

- James Hoch (microbiologist) (fl. 1960s–2010s), American microbiologist
- James Hoch (poet) (born 1967), American poet
