= Twisp Mountain =

Mountain in Washington (state), United States

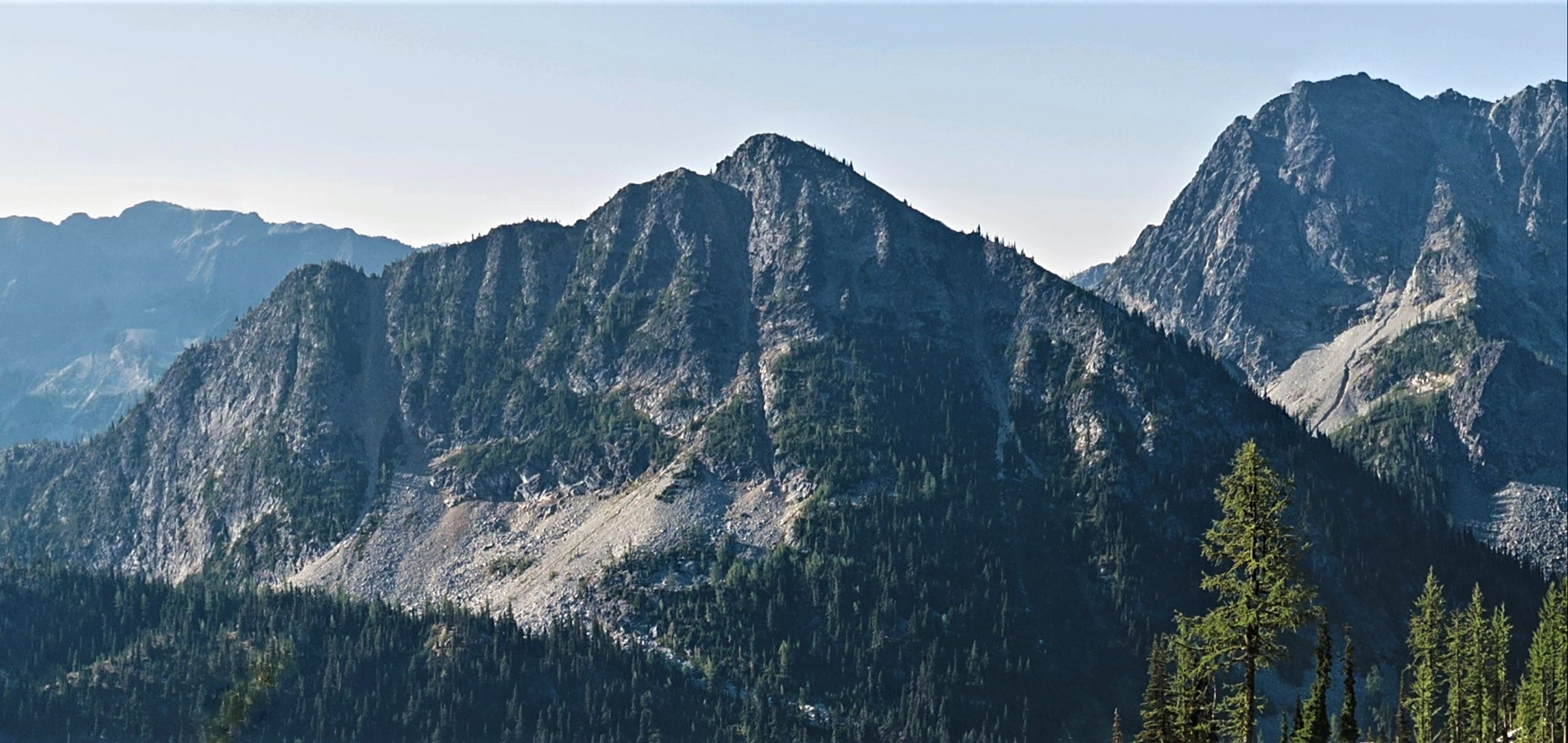
- North aspect

Highest point
- Elevation: 7,161 ft (2,183 m)
- Prominence: 921 ft (281 m)
- Parent peak: Hock Mountain (7,750 ft)
- Isolation: 0.99 mi (1.59 km)
- Coordinates: 48°27′40″N 120°39′04″W

Geography
- Location within Washington (state) Location within the United States
- Interactive map of Twisp Mountain
- Country: United States
- State: Washington
- County: Chelan / Okanogan
- Protected area: Lake Chelan-Sawtooth Wilderness; North Cascades National Park
- Parent range: North Cascades
- Topo map: USGS McAlester Mountain

Geology
- Rock age: Late Cretaceous
- Rock type: Tonalitic pluton

Twisp Mountain is a 7,161-foot-elevation (2,183-meter) summit located in the Methow Mountains, a subset of the North Cascades in Washington state. It is situated on the shared boundary of North Cascades National Park with Lake Chelan-Sawtooth Wilderness, as well as the common border between Chelan County and Okanogan County. Additionally, it rises immediately southwest of Twisp Pass, and one mile northeast of Hock Mountain, the nearest higher neighbor. Precipitation runoff from the west side of Twisp Mountain drains to the Stehekin River via Bridge Creek, whereas the east side of the mountain drains into the South Fork Twisp River.

== Climate ==
Weather fronts originating in the Pacific Ocean travel east toward the Cascade Mountains. As fronts approach the North Cascades, they are forced upward by the peaks of the Cascade Range, causing them to drop their moisture in the form of rain or snow onto the Cascades. As a result, the North Cascades experience high precipitation, especially during the winter months in the form of snowfall. Because of maritime influence, snow tends to be wet and heavy, resulting in avalanche danger. During winter months, weather is usually cloudy, but due to high pressure systems over the Pacific Ocean that intensify during summer months, there is often little or no cloud cover during the summer.

== Etymology ==
In addition to Twisp Mountain, the Twisp name is applied to Twisp River, Twisp Pass, and the community of Twisp. The common explanation is that Twisp comes from the Okanagan placename /txʷəc'p/, which possibly translates to wasp, yellowjacket, or the sound made by a wasp. This mountain's toponym has been officially adopted by the United States Board on Geographic Names.

== Geology ==
The North Cascades features some of the most rugged topography in the Cascade Range with craggy peaks, ridges, and deep glacial valleys. Geological events occurring many years ago created the diverse topography and drastic elevation changes over the Cascade Range leading to the various climate differences. These climate differences lead to vegetation variety defining the ecoregions in this area.

The history of the formation of the Cascade Mountains dates back millions of years ago to the late Eocene Epoch. With the North American Plate overriding the Pacific Plate, episodes of volcanic igneous activity persisted. In addition, small fragments of the oceanic and continental lithosphere called terranes created the North Cascades about 50 million years ago.

During the Pleistocene period dating back over two million years ago, glaciation advancing and retreating repeatedly scoured the landscape leaving deposits of rock debris. The U-shaped cross section of the river valleys is a result of recent glaciation. Uplift and faulting in combination with glaciation have been the dominant processes which have created the tall peaks and deep valleys of the North Cascades.

== See also ==
Geography of the North Cascades
