= Hošek =

Hošek is a Czech surname. It was created as a diminutive of the surname Hoch and the Czech word hoch ('boy', 'lad'), but there is a theory that it also originated from the Jewish name Joshua and from the folk Czech name for 'heron'. Notable people with the surname include:

- Chaviva Hošek (born 1946), Canadian academic, feminist and politician
- Jan Hošek (born 1989), Czech footballer
- Karel Anton Hošek (1871–1907), Czech adventurer and revolutionary
- Petr Hošek (footballer) (born 1989), Czech footballer
- Rich Hosek (born 1964), American television writer
- Václav Hošek (1909–1943), Czech athlete

== See also ==
- Helga Hošková-Weissová (born 1929), Czech painter
