= Stiletto Peak =

Summit in North America

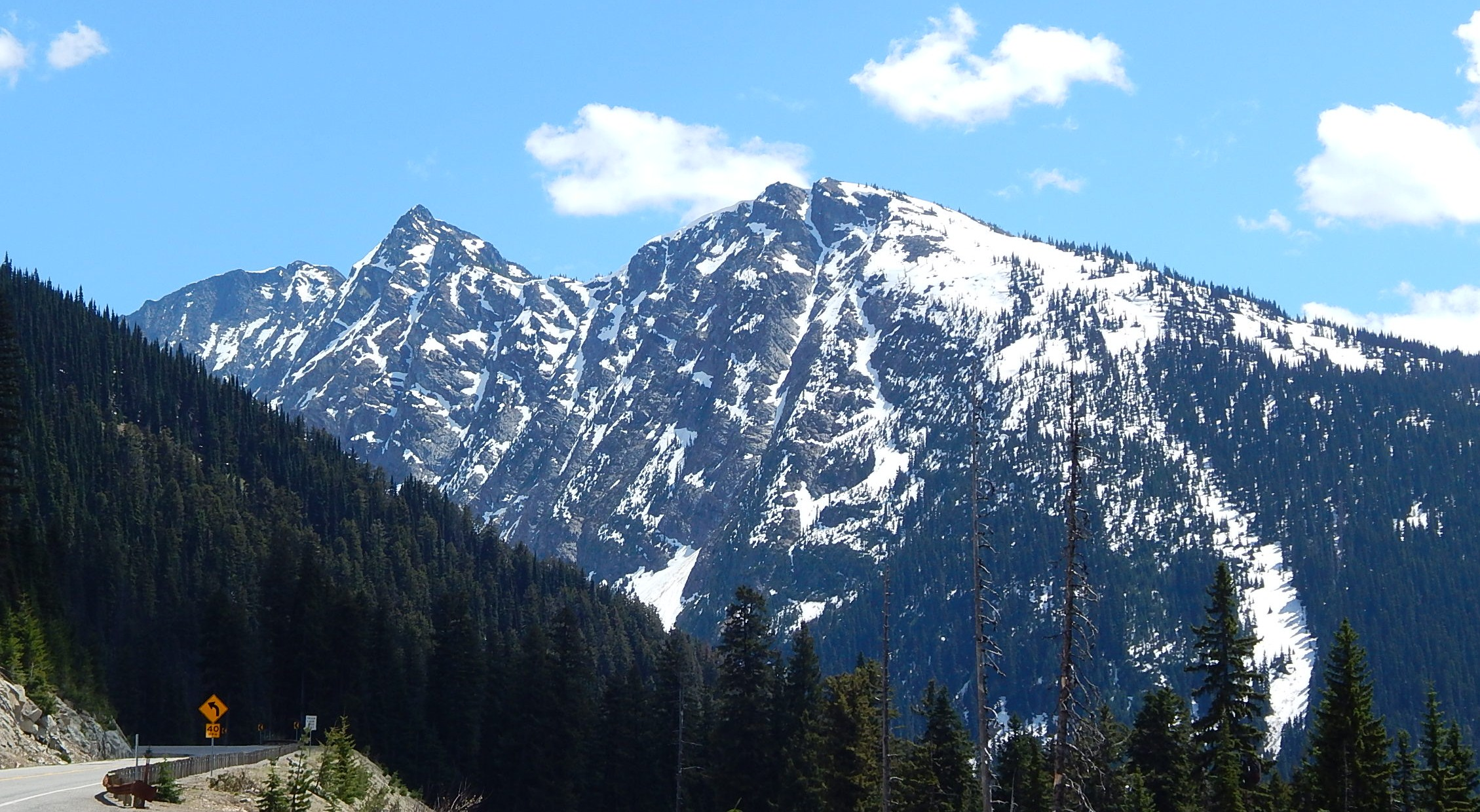
- Stiletto Peak seen from North Cascades Highway

Highest point
- Elevation: 7,651 ft (2,332 m)
- Prominence: 406 ft (124 m)
- Isolation: 0.23 mi (0.37 km)
- Coordinates: 48°29′01″N 120°40′00″W

Geography
- Location within Washington (state) Location within the United States
- Interactive map of Stiletto Peak
- Country: United States
- State: Washington
- County: Chelan
- Protected area: Stephen Mather Wilderness
- Parent range: North Cascades
- Topo map: USGS McAlester Mountain

Geology
- Rock age: Late Cretaceous
- Rock type: Tonalitic pluton

Climbing
- Easiest route: Scrambling

Stiletto Peak is a 7,651-foot (2,332-metre) summit located in the Methow Mountains, a sub-range of the North Cascades in Washington state. It is situated in the Stephen Mather Wilderness on a ridge which also has Switchblade Peak and Jackknife Peak to its east. Stiletto Peak is also located on the boundary of North Cascades National Park, 2.24 miles (3.60 km) due north of Hock Mountain. Precipitation runoff on the north side of the mountain drains to Bridge Creek via Copper Creek, whereas the south side of the mountain drains into the East Fork Bridge Creek.

== Climate ==
Weather fronts originating in the Pacific Ocean travel northeast toward the Cascade Mountains. As fronts approach the North Cascades, they are forced upward by the peaks (orographic lift), causing them to drop their moisture in the form of rain or snow onto the Cascades. As a result, the west side of the North Cascades experiences high precipitation, especially during the winter months in the form of snowfall. Because of maritime influence, snow tends to be wet and heavy, resulting in high avalanche danger. During winter months, weather is usually cloudy, but, due to high pressure systems over the Pacific Ocean that intensify during summer months, there is often little or no cloud cover during the summer.

== Geology ==
The North Cascades features some of the most rugged topography in the Cascade Range with craggy peaks, ridges, and deep glacial valleys. Geological events occurring many years ago created the diverse topography and drastic elevation changes over the Cascade Range leading to the various climate differences. These climate differences lead to vegetation variety defining the ecoregions in this area.

The history of the formation of the Cascade Mountains dates back millions of years ago to the late Eocene Epoch. With the North American Plate overriding the Pacific Plate, episodes of volcanic igneous activity persisted. In addition, small fragments of the oceanic and continental lithosphere called terranes created the North Cascades about 50 million years ago.

During the Pleistocene period dating back over two million years ago, glaciation advancing and retreating repeatedly scoured the landscape leaving deposits of rock debris. The U-shaped cross section of the river valleys is a result of recent glaciation. Uplift and faulting in combination with glaciation have been the dominant processes which have created the tall peaks and deep valleys of the North Cascades.

== Gallery ==
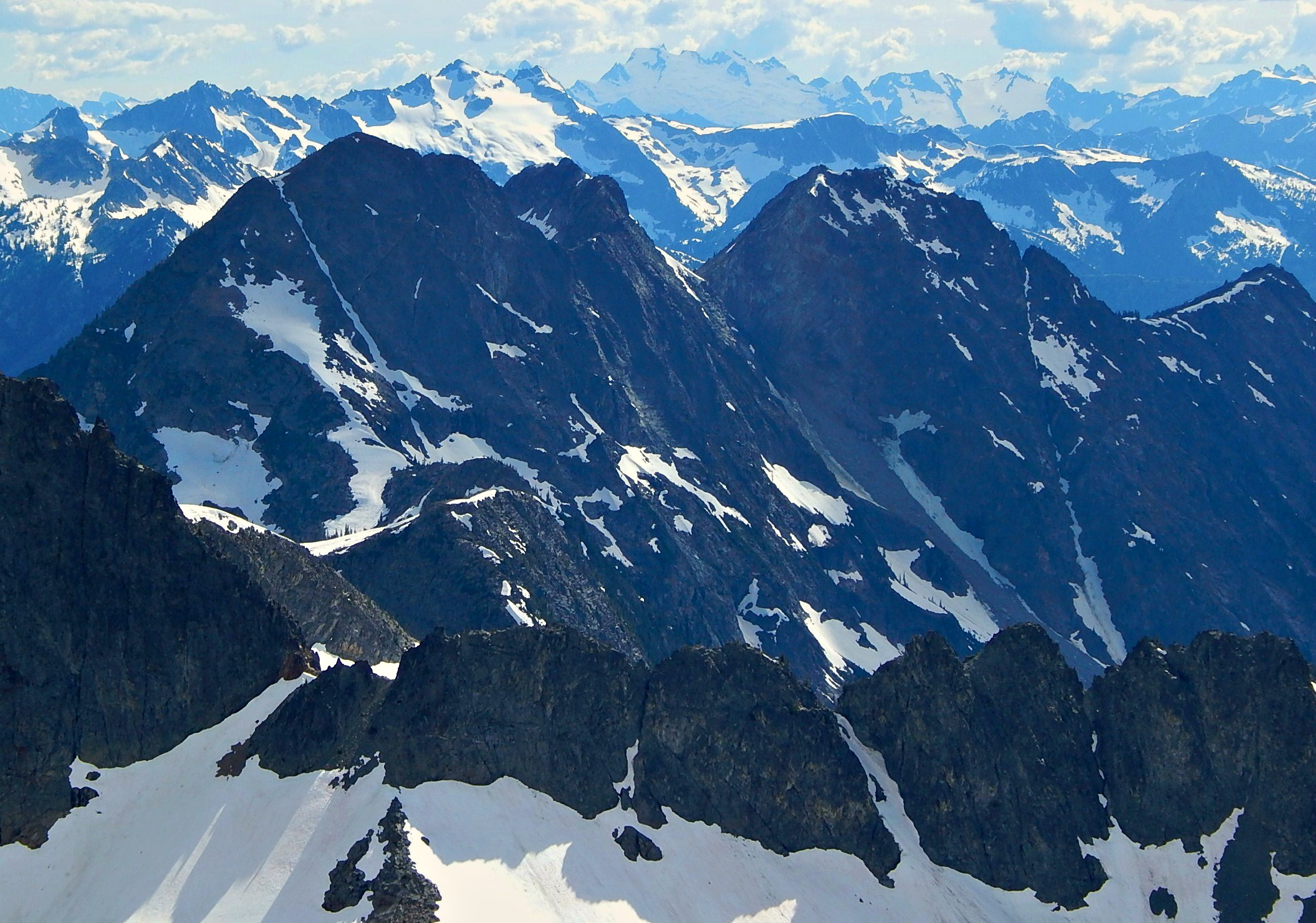
Switchblade and Stiletto peaks seen from Wallaby Peak

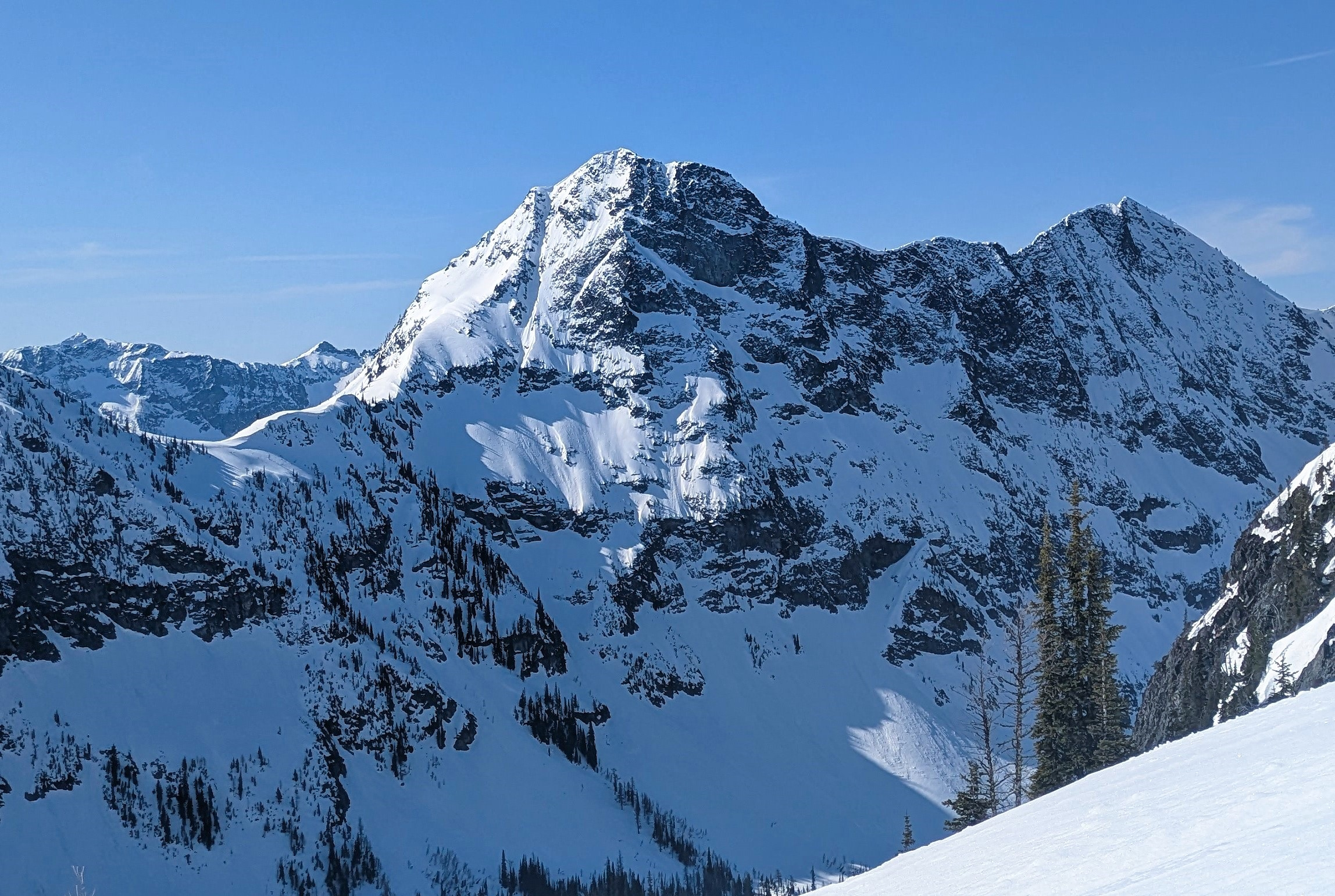
North aspect of Switchblade Peak

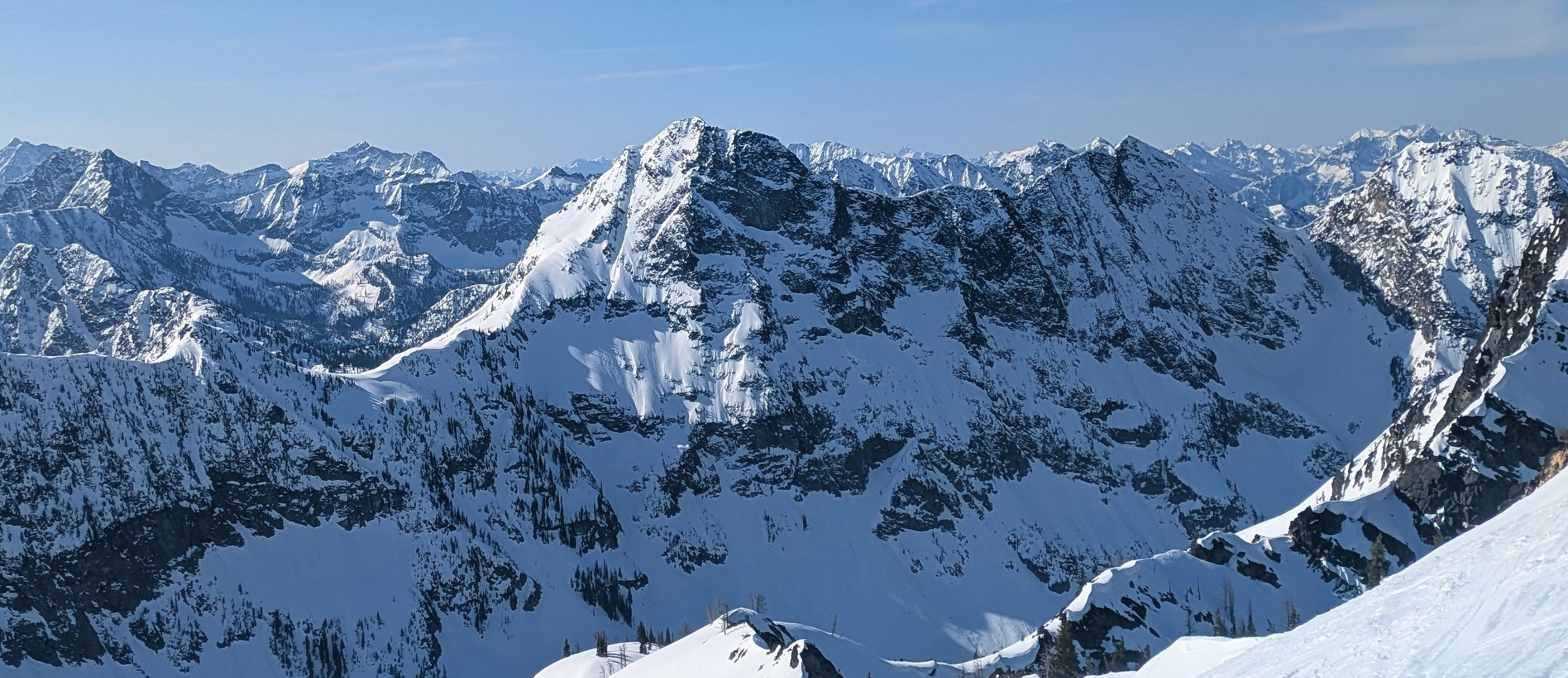
Switchblade Peak centered, Stiletto Peak at far right

== See also ==
- Geography of the North Cascades
