= Ken Lum =

Canadian artist (born 1956)

- Born: September 26, 1956 (age 70); Vancouver, British Columbia, Canada
- Education: University of British Columbia (MFA, 1985)
- Occupations: Academic, painter, photographer, sculptor, writer
- Known for: Contemporary artist

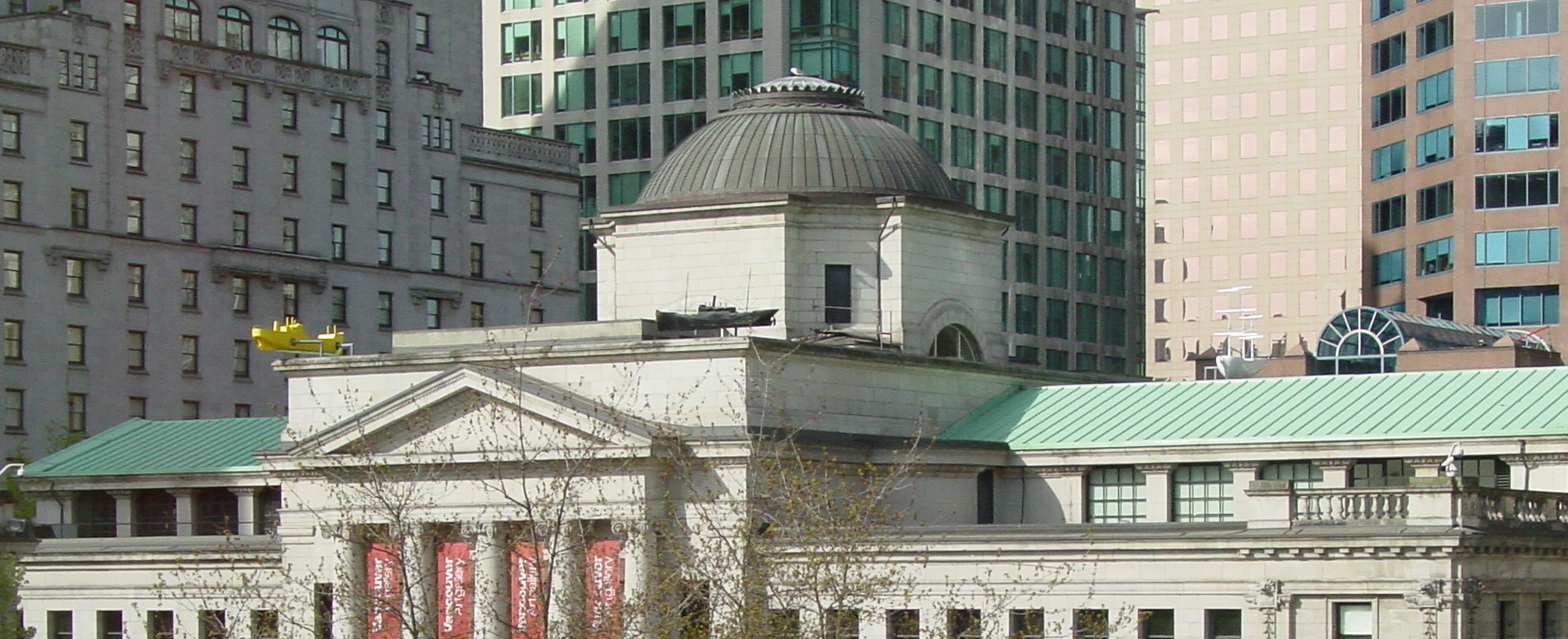
Four Boats Stranded: Red and Yellow, Black and White was installed upon the roof of the Vancouver Art Gallery in 2001

Kenneth Robert Lum, OC DFA (Chinese: 林荫庭; Chinese: 林蔭庭; Jyutping: lam4 jam3 ting4; born 1956) is a Canadian and American artist, academic, and curator. Lum's artistic practice spans multiple media including painting, sculpture and photography. His playfully politically oriented works, which range from conceptual to representational, often explore themes of identity linked to language, portraiture, and spatial politics. Since 2012, Lum has taught as a Professor of Fine Art in the Stuart Weitzman School of Design, the University of Pennsylvania in Philadelphia.

== Early life ==
Lum was born in Vancouver, British Columbia in 1956 and grew up in Strathcona, Vancouver and Kensington-Cedar Cottage in East Vancouver. He attended Admiral Seymour Elementary, Lord Selkirk Elementary and Gladstone Secondary School.

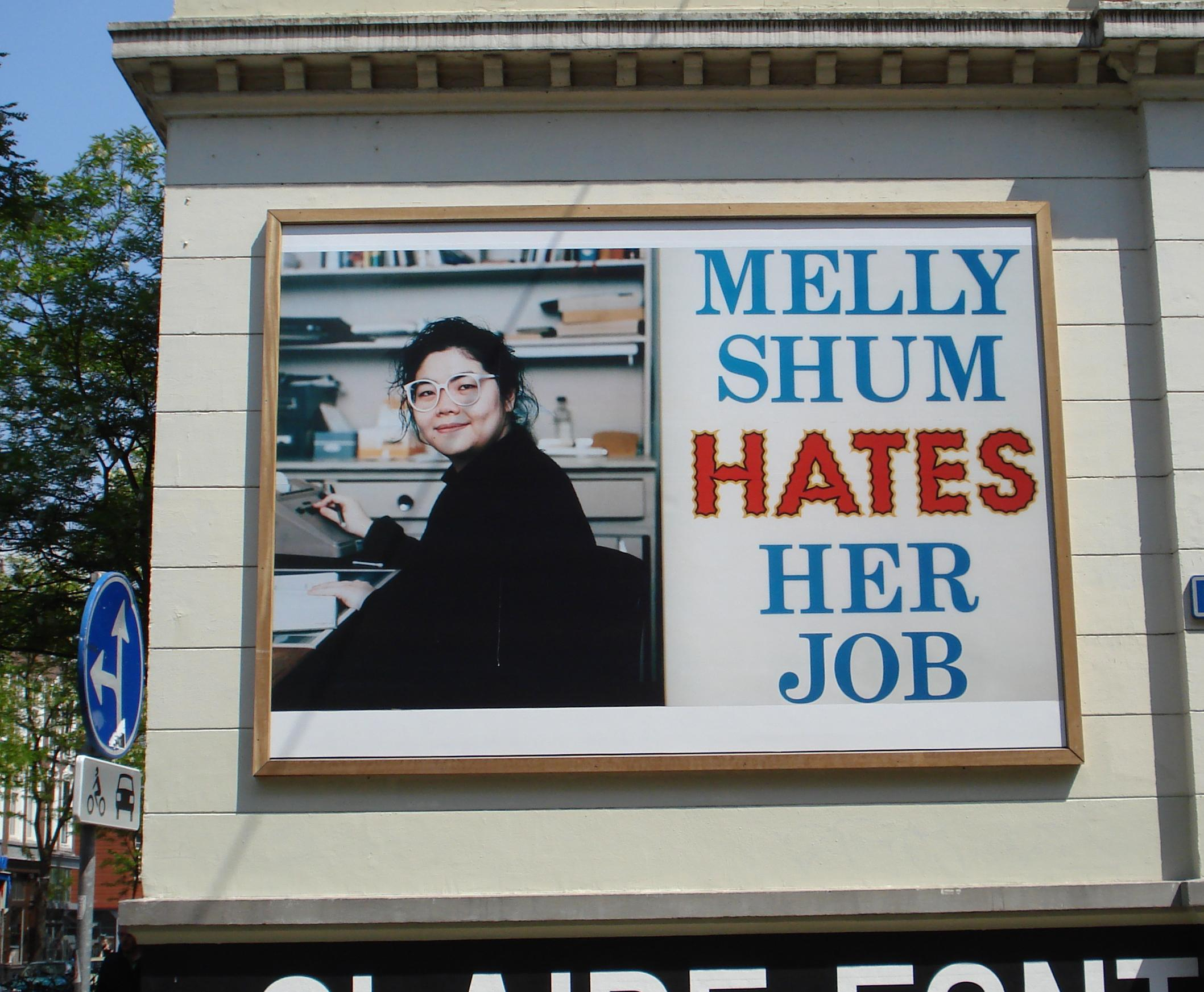
Rotterdam kunstwerk Melly Shum hates her job

== Career ==
Lum received an MFA from University of British Columbia (UBC) in 1985. One of his earliest major projects was his Portrait-Logo series from the mid-1980s, in which he paired portraits with logos, names, or descriptive text. The works borrow from the aesthetics of family photography and advertising, sometimes also commenting on stereotypes of gender and ethnicity. By creating a tension between image and text, Lum destabilizes meaning and makes the viewer conscious of their role in constructing meaning.

He is represented by the New York City gallery Magenta Plains, Galerie Nagel-Draxler (Berlin and Cologne), Royale Projects (Los Angeles), and Misa Shin Gallery (Tokyo).

=== Teaching ===
From 2000 to 2006, Lum was Head of the Graduate Program in Studio Art at the University of British Columbia, where he had taught since 1990, resigning in 2006. Lum joined the faculty of Bard College's Milton Avery Graduate School of the Arts in 2005 and worked at Bard until 2007. He taught at the École Nationale Supérieure des Beaux-Arts in Paris from 1995 to 1997 while taking leave from UBC.

Lum guest taught a semester at the Akademie der Bildenden Kunste or Academy of Fine Arts, Munich, the China Academy of Art in Hangzhou, China, the l'Ecole d'Arts Plastique in Fort de France, Martinique. For several years, he served as an External Critic at De Ateliers and the Rijksakademie, both located in Amsterdam, as well as the Maine College of Art in Portland, Maine, California College of the Arts in San Francisco. He led several so-named Master Classes at the Banff Centre. In 2012, Lum joined the faculty of the University of Pennsylvania's Stuart Weitzman School of Design in Philadelphia. The following year, he was appointed a Fellow of the Penn Institute for Urban Research. In 2019, he received the title of University of Pennsylvania Presidential Professor, specifically holding the endowed position of Marilyn Jordan Taylor Presidential Professor of Fine Arts.

=== Awards ===
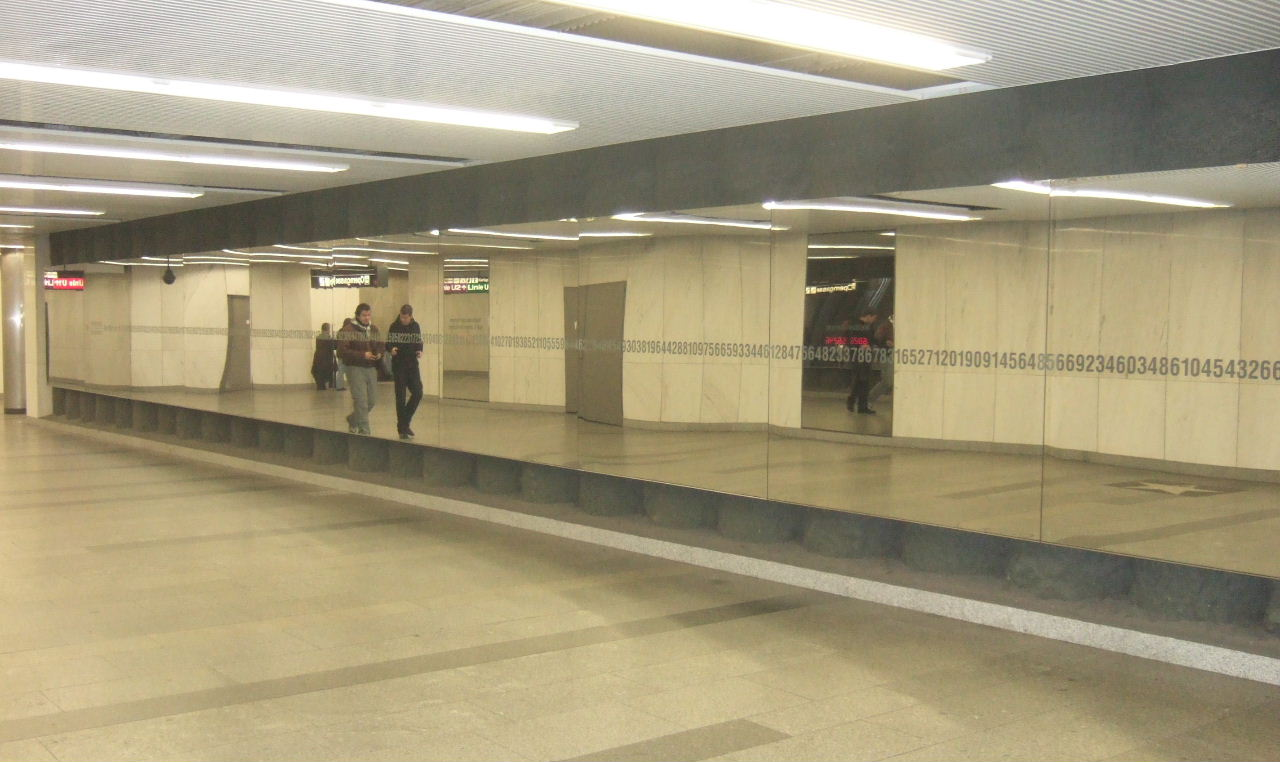
Ken Lum: Pi

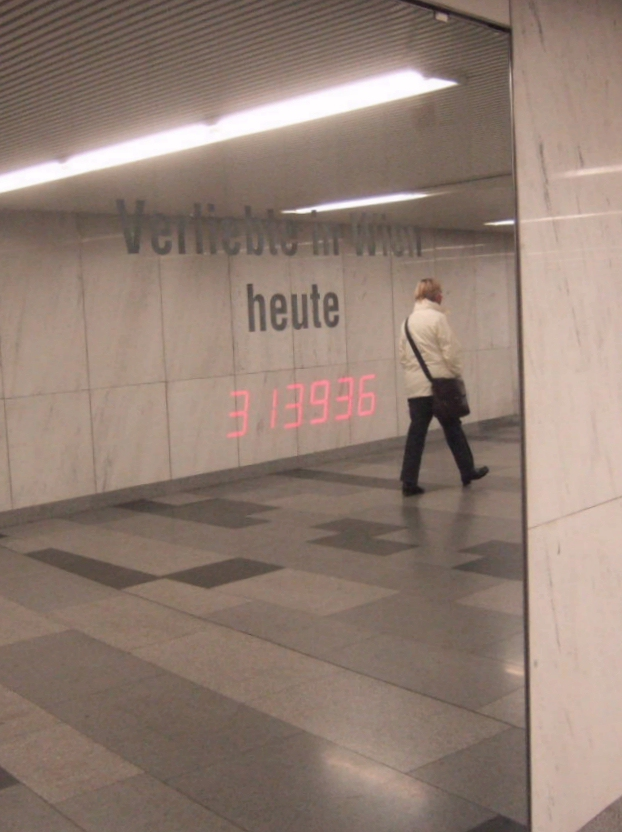
Ken Lum: Verliebte in Wien

While at the University of British Columbia, he received the Killam Award for Outstanding Research in 1998 and the John Simon Guggenheim Fellowship in 1999. In 2003, Lum was honored with the Distinguished University Professor Award and the Dorothy Somerset Award for Outstanding Achievement in Creative and Performing Arts. He was awarded the Hnatyshyn Foundation Visual Arts Award in 2007. In 2011, Lum received an ArtMoves Special Award from the City of Toruń, Poland. In 2013, he won a Vancouver Mayor's Arts Award in public art. In 2015, Lum was awarded an Honoris Causa Doctorate degree from Simon Fraser University, his undergraduate alma mater.

In 2017, he was appointed as an Officer of the Order of Canada. In 2018, Lum was awarded a Pew Fellowship from the Pew Center for Arts and Heritage. In 2019, Lum was awarded the Gershon Iskowitz Award and in 2020 a Governor General's Awards in Visual and Media Arts. Lum won the Scotiabank Photography Award in 2023. Lum was awarded the Monument Lab Changemaker Award during a ceremony at the Independence Visitor Center in Philadelphia. In 2024, Lum was conferred a King Charles III Coronation Medal by David Eby, the premier of British Columbia, Canada.

=== Exhibitions ===
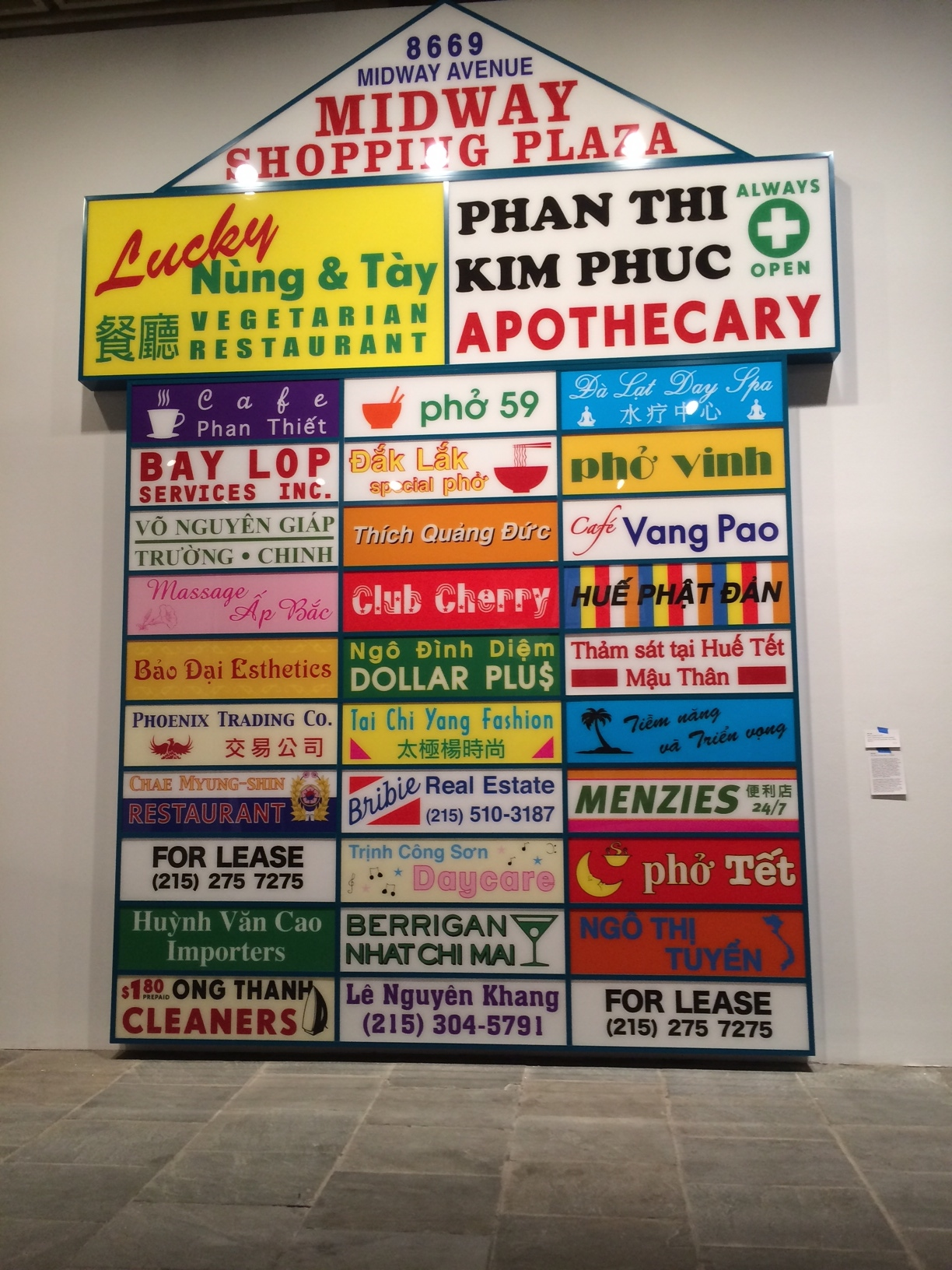
Work by Ken Lum for the Whitney Biennial 2014

Lum participated in the Carnegie International 1991, Sydney Biennale in 1995, the São Paulo Art Biennial in 1997, and the Shanghai Biennale in 2000 where he also helped edit the exhibition catalog, and at Documenta XI in 2002. Other exhibitions include Johannesburg Biennale 1997, Liverpool Biennial 2006, Tang Contemporary Art (Beijing), Istanbul Biennial 2007 and the 2008 Gwangju Biennale (Gwangju, South Korea) and Arrow Factory Beijing in 2010.

A retrospective survey of Lum's work opened in February 2011 at the Vancouver Art Gallery. Lum participated and gave a presentation at the Moscow Biennale 2011. In 2014, he exhibited at the Rosenwald-Wolf Gallery of the University of the Arts (Philadelphia). The Whitney Museum of American Art invited Lum to exhibit as part of the 2014 Whitney Biennial. In 2018, he exhibited in a survey exhibition at the Wattis Institute for Contemporary Arts in San Francisco. In 2022, due to Lum's being a recipient of the Gershon Iskowitz Prize (2019), the exhibition Ken Lum: Death and Furniture was held at the Art Gallery of Ontario curated by Xiaoyu Weng and co-organized by the Art Gallery of Ontario and the Remai Modern. As the Scotiabank Photographer Award winner for 2023, Lum was conferred a solo exhibition at The Image Centre in Toronto in 2024, he was also subject of a published book distributed worldwide by Steidl.

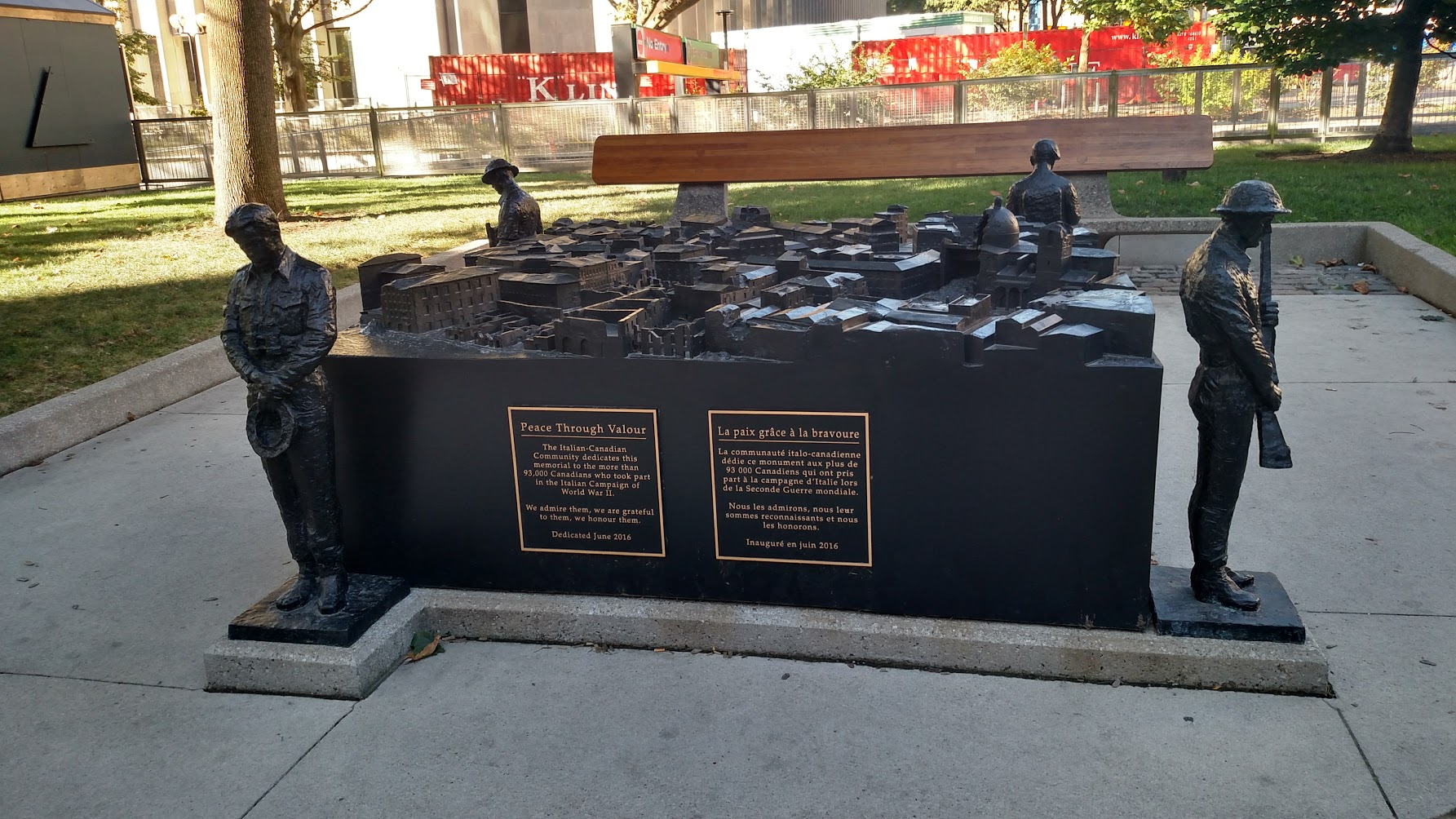
Peace Through Valour (Battle of Ortona)

=== Cultural service activities ===
Lum has participated in numerous public committees throughout his career. He served as the director of the then-non-funded Or Gallery (Vancouver) from 1982 to 1984 and was a member of the City of Vancouver's Public Art Committee from 1994 to 1996. He sat on the board of directors for the Or Gallery from 1992 to 1994, and he was a board member with the Arts Initiative Tokyo in Japan from 2001 to 2008. He served on the board of the Annie Wong Art Foundation in Hong Kong from 1998 to 2002 and on Centre A: Center for Asian Art (Vancouver) 2002 to 2007. From 2003 to 2004, Lum was a member of the Vancouver Art Gallery's Master Planning Committee. In 2010, he was a part of the advisory committee for the Canada Council dedicated to international engagement and acted as a juror for the City of Vancouver exhibitions assistance awards.

From 2010 to 2012, he was a juror for the Mayor's Art Awards in (Vancouver). In 2010, he also presented at the inaugural Yishu Art Awards held in Xi'an, China. In 2011, he served as a juror for the Brink Award in (Seattle) focusing on emerging artists from (British Columbia, Washington, and Oregon). From 2011 to 2017, he was a board member of the Canada Post Stamp Advisory Committee in Ottawa, Ontario. He also served as a board member of The Power Plant Contemporary Art Gallery in (Toronto) from 2011 to 2012.

In 2003, Lum was a juror for the Prix de Rome prize in the Netherlands, specifically for the category of Art in Public Space at the Rijksakademie in Amsterdam, for which he wrote the accompanying essay for the publication on the prize. From 2007 - 2012, he was on the advisory board of Fillip, a critical art and cultural journal based in Vancouver. In 2008, Lum acted as a juror for the Chinese Contemporary Art Awards in Beijing to which he also wrote an essay on the winning artist Liu Wei and juror for the New Contemporaries Exhibition in London, UK. Lum was a juror of the inaugural Lola Award for Contemporary Dance (Vancouver) in 2012. From 2013 to 2015, Lum was a board member of CACHET (Canadian Art Commons for History of Art Education and Training), a three-year project of the University of Toronto's University College Canadian Studies program. In 2015, Lum was a juror for the Jerome Emerging Artists Fellowship in Minneapolis, Minnesota. In 2017, he was a juror of the AIMIA/AGO photography prize. In 2019, Lum participated as a juror for the 9.4 billion USD King Salman Park project in Riyadh, Saudi Arabia. Lum was also a Toronto Biennial of Art board member from 2020 to 2023. Since 2022, he has been on the board of Tilt Institute for the Contemporary Image in Philadelphia.

=== Keynote addresses ===
Lum has delivered several keynote addresses throughout his career. He was the keynote speaker at the 1997 Universities Art Association of Canada annual conference. In 2006, he served as the keynote speaker at the third and final symposium of the 15th Biennale of Sydney in Sydney, Australia. In 2010, Lum was the keynote speaker at the annual CIMAM World Museums conference held at the Shanghai Art Museum in Shanghai, China. In early 2020, he gave the keynote address at the inauguration of the Kunstinstituut Melly multi-purpose venue in Rotterdam, the Netherlands. Later that year, he delivered the keynote address for the "Becoming Public Art" conference in Markham, Ontario, conducted virtually due to the pandemic. In 2022, Lum was the keynote speaker at the International Association of Empirical Aesthetics conference hosted by the Perelman School of Medicine at the University of Pennsylvania. He was the keynote speaker at the 2023 Canadian Arts Conference at Koerner Hall, the University of Toronto. In 2024, Lum gave the keynote address for the Annual Karl Duldig Lecture on Sculpture in Melbourne, Australia. In 2025, Lum was keynote presenter at the BUMP Urban Art Festival in Calgary, Alberta.

=== Writings ===
From 1999 to 2001, Lum wrote an online journal for LondonArt, which chronicled both his passion for and concerns about art. In 2000, he co-founded the Yishu Journal of Contemporary Chinese Art with Zheng Shengtian and served as Editor-in-Chief until 2004. Together, they organized the first large-scale international curators' tour of China in 2000, which included curators from notable institutions such as Documenta, Dia Art Foundation, Renaissance Society, Museum Boijmans Van Beuningen, Gate Foundation and the Art Gallery of Ontario.

Lum has authored many essays covering a range of topics on art and culture, including the relationship between art and ethnology for the National Museum of Ethnology, Leiden, Netherlands, as well as the art of Chen Zhen for the Kunsthalle Wien (Vienna Kunsthalle). His other writings include a historical analysis of Canadian cultural policy and a paper presented to the Department of Caribbean Studies at Yale University, which explored multiple identities as depicted in Théodore Géricault's The Raft of the Medusa. In 2008, Lum completed an art book project with French philosopher Hubert Damisch, titled Ultimo Bagaglio, published by Three Star Books in Paris. In 2009, Lum contributed an essay addressing the challenges facing art education today for Art School: (Propositions for the 21st Century) published by MIT Press. In 2012, following his move to Philadelphia, he began writing a quarterly art column for "Canadian Art" magazine. In 2013, he presented a paper for publication on contemporary art versus visual culture for the M+ Museum of Visual Culture of the West Kowloon Cultural District of Hong Kong. He also presented a paper on the work of conceptual artist Ian Wilson at the Dia Art Foundation in New York.

In 2016, Lum contributed a catalog essay for the Museum of Contemporary Art Cleveland. The book and catalog for the exhibition and project "Monument Lab: Creative Speculations for Philadelphia" was issued in the fall of 2019 by Temple University Press. A book of writings titled "Everything is Relevant: Writings on Art and Life, 1991 - 2018" was released by Concordia University Press in early 2020. He contributed an essay for the book "Best! Letters from Asian Americans in the Arts" in 2020. In 2023, he wrote an essay for the catalog for Brenda Draney's exhibition at The Power Plant Contemporary Art Gallery in Toronto.

=== Screenplays ===
In 2020, he completed a screenplay about comparative racism after the American Civil War. In 2022, Lum wrote a second screenplay centered on the 1885 Chinese expulsion from Tacoma, Washington Territory. The synopsis for The Cook is: In 1865, three years after the end of the Civil War, the Union of the Nation was preserved, and the institution of slavery was formally abolished. In the wake of these changes, railway and mining companies have turned to importing indentured Chinese laborers, often referred to as "coolies," to the United States as a replacement for the newly freed African American slaves. At the center of this evolving landscape is Joel Scott, who leads a hauling company unit tasked with transporting mining equipment and freshly arrived Chinese laborers from Astoria, Oregon, to the gold fields of Idaho via the nascent Oregon Trail. The story revolves around nine crucial days in the life of Chung, a teenage boy from southern China, who is hired to cook for Joel's unit. Chung quickly gains a reputation for his culinary skills, but his newfound success attracts the attention of a rival hauling company, leading to his kidnapping.

The synopsis for The Expulsion is: The Expulsion explores the Chinese immigrant experience in America during the post-slavery era, particularly focusing on their struggles with indentured labor. The screenplay is set in 1885 in Tacoma, Washington Territory. It is based on actual events that unfolded during a time marked by intense anti-Chinese sentiments, especially among white unionized workers. These workers attributed the availability of low-cost Chinese labor to the decline in their wages and the threat to their jobs rather than recognizing the Chinese community as potential allies in their fight against large, exploitative companies. The screenplay vividly depicts the unique setting of the waterfront Chinatown of Tacoma, which was ingeniously built on stilts over littoral zones beyond the authority of Tacoma. It follows the community's journey as they face the looming expulsion date set by the Mayor of Tacoma, which demanded the removal of all Chinese residents.

=== Curatorial ===
Lum's activities include several curatorial projects. He was Director of the non-profit and then non-funded Or Gallery in Vancouver from 1982 to 1984. While Or Gallery Director, he curated PoCo Rococo, an exhibition held in Coquitlam Centre, a large suburban shopping mall in Coquitlam. The exhibition included high school art students of Coquitlam and Port Coquitlam with established city artists. In 2001, Lum was part of a team that founded a Humanities 101 educational lectures program for low-income people in Vancouver's Downtown Eastside. Lum was an advisor for The Short Century: Independence and Liberation Movements in Africa 1945 to 1994, a 2001 exhibition conceived and curated by Okwui Enwezor. Lum was curator of the 2004 NorthWest Annual for the Center of Contemporary Art in Seattle. In 2005, Lum co-curated Shanghai Modern 1919-1945, an exhibition about the city's art and culture during the republican era. He contributed an essay for the exhibition on Aesthetic Education in China. The same year, he also co-curated and contributed an essay for the 7th Sharjah Biennial in The Emirate of Sharjah, United Arab Emirates, the largest international contemporary art biennale in the Middle East. In 2015, along with Paul Farber and A. Will Brown, Lum co-conceived and co-curated Monument Lab: Creative Speculations for Philadelphia, a public art and urban research project sited in the courtyard of Philadelphia City Hall. The project consisted of a specially designed research pavilion, a prototype monument by artist Terry Adkins, and free dialogues led by Philadelphia artists and critical thinkers using William Penn's iconic plan for the city's five public squares as inspiration.

=== Public art ===
Lum has worked on several public art projects. In Vienna in 2000, Lum realized a 540 square meter work on the side of the centrally located Kunsthalle Wien for the non-profit art initiative museum in progress. The work, There is no place like home, generated controversy as Lum saw the work as a response to the growth of the extreme right in Europe. Lum's Four Boats Stranded: Red and Yellow, Black and White was installed upon the Vancouver Art Gallery roof in 2001. The work, which can be viewed as a comment on immigration and acculturation, features four model boats: a First Nations longboat, a cargo ship, the steam liner Komagata Maru, and George Vancouver's ship HMS Discovery. Each vessel has been placed at one of the building's compass points—north, south, east, and west—and painted in a color intended to reflect the stereotyped racial vision presented in the hymn "Jesus Loves the Little Children."

Lum realized a second permanent public art commission outside St. Moritz, Switzerland in 2003 that dealt with the declining Romansch way of life in the remote Engadine region of Switzerland. The work titled Il Buolf Mus-chin Museum was a commission of the Walter A. Bechtler Foundation of Zurich and the Zürcher Hochschule der Künste.

In 2005, Lum completed A Tale of Two Children: A Work for Strathcona, a permanent work commissioned by the City of Vancouver's Public Works Yard. Another major public art commission by Lum, sponsored by the city of Vienna, Austria, and Wiener Linien (Vienna Public Transit), opened in downtown Vienna in January 2007. Titled Pi, the work is over 130 meter long and situated in a prominent pedestrian passageway by Vienna's Karlsplatz subway interchange. In 2011, Lum realized a permanent public art commission for the city of Utrecht, Netherlands. The work is located in the Nieuw Welgelegen district, a troubled but dynamic multi-ethnic area of Utrecht that is undergoing redevelopment. The work titled January 1, 1960 consists of a monumentally scaled topographical and political globe of the world as it looked at the start of 1960.

In early 2010, Lum completed Monument for East Vancouver, colloquially known as the East Van Cross, an outdoor artwork located in the traditionally working-class side of Vancouver. In Vancouver, he also realized From Shangri-la to Shangri-la, a temporary installation based on huts that were erected on the Maplewood mudflats in North Vancouver during the second half of the twentieth century. Scale models of these structures appear to float over the surface of a corporate reflecting pond, creating a marked juxtaposition between their makeshift construction and the surrounding architecture while evoking the utopian character of the mudflat community in the seemingly inexorable advance of urban development.

In mid-2010, Lum won a public art commission for Across Time and Space, Two Children of Toronto Meet in Toronto, Ontario completed in 2013. Late in 2010, Lum was selected as the lead artist on the design team for the new Walterdale Bridge replacement scheduled for construction from 2013 to 2017 in Edmonton, Alberta. Lum completed in 2013 public art commissions premised on the tragic-historical figures of Homer Plessy and Dred Scott as a connecting narrative between the Laumeier Sculpture Park in St Louis, Missouri and Longue Vue House and Gardens in New Orleans, Louisiana.

In 2016, Lum completed a memorial dedicated to the Canadian war effort in Italy during World War II. This memorial emphasizes the Battle of Ortona in which Canadian forces achieved victory yet suffered considerable losses. It is situated at Nathan Phillips Square, adjacent to Toronto City Hall.

Lum won a commission in 2016 to design a memorial to the 1986 Lake Nyos disaster in Cameroon. The memorial project was canceled due to secessionist unrest in the area. A large public art project for the block 13 development in North York, Toronto, was completed in the spring of 2019. In 2024, he completed a public art project for the Century City development in Surrey, B.C., and was awarded a public art commission for another private development near Central Park in Burnaby, B.C.

=== Select collections ===
- Museum moderner Kunst Stiftung Ludwig, Vienna, Austria
- Hammer Museum, Los Angeles, CA
- Helga de Alvear Collection, Madrid, Spain
- Musée d’art Moderne et Contemporain, Geneva, Switzerland
- Tate Modern, London, UK
- Moderna Museet, Stockholm, Sweden
- Fundación AMMA Amparo y Manuel, Mexico City, Mexico
- Kunstmuseum Luzern, Lucerne, Switzerland
- Walter A Bechtler Foundation, Zurich, Switzerland
- M+ Museum of Visual Culture, Hong Kong, China
- Museum Boijmans van-Beuningen, Rotterdam, The Netherlands
- Centro Galego de Arte Contemporanea, Santiago de Campostela, Spain
- Rothschild & Co Collection, Zurich, Switzerland
- Pierre Huber Collection, Geneva, Switzerland
- Art Gallery of Ontario, Toronto, ON
- Joanneumsviertel Neue Galerie, Graz, Austria
- Jerome L. Stern Family Foundation, New York, NY
- Stadtische Galerie im Lenbachhaus und Kunstbau, Munich, Germany
- FRAC Haute Normandie, Rouen, France
- Annie Wong Art Collection, Hong Kong, China
- BMO Collection, Toronto, ON,
- Arco Foundation Collection, Madrid, Spain
- Uwe Lenhart, Frankfurt, Germany
- Kerri Hoffman Collection, Portland, OR
- Anders Pilm Collection, Stockholm, Sweden
- Centro de Arte Contemporáneo De Huarte, Navarro, Spain
- FRAC Ile de France, le Plateau, Paris
- Musée Municipal, La Roche-sur-Yon, France
- FRAC Nord Pas de Calais, Dunkirk, France
- Servais Family Collection, Brussels, Belgium
- Cypress College, Cypress, CA
- RISD Museum, Providence, RI
- Joanne Cohen, Cleveland, OH
- Buffalo Albright-Knox Art Museum, Buffalo, NY
- Bank of Nova Scotia, Toronto, ON
- DZ Bank Collection, Frankfurt, Germany
- RBC Collection, Toronto, ON
- Klaus Nordenhake, Berlin, Germany
- Witte de With Center for Contemporary Art, Rotterdam, The Netherlands
- Morris and Helen Belkin Art Gallery, Vancouver, BC
- Museum Volkenkunde, Leiden, The Netherlands
- Musée d’Art Contemporain, Montreal, QC
- Daniel Friedman, Winnipeg, MB
- Elaine Cohen Collection, New York, NY
- National Gallery of Canada, Ottawa, ON
- Ralph Wernicke Collection, Berlin, Germany
- Simon Fraser University, Burnaby, BC
- Gilles and Julia Ouellette Collection, Toronto, ON
- Francis and Eleanor Shen, Toronto, ON
- Schulich School of Business Collection, York University, Toronto, ON
- Laumeier Sculpture Park, St Louis, MO
- Kelowna Art Gallery, Kelowna, BC
- Paul Bain, Toronto, ON
- Tom Gautreau, Vancouver, BC
- Long March Space, Beijing, China
- Michael Audain and Yoshiko Karasawa, West Vancouver, BC
- Hart House at the University of Toronto, Toronto, ON
- Vancouver Art Gallery, Vancouver, BC
- Winnipeg Art Gallery, Winnipeg, MB
- Remai Modern, Saskatoon, SK
- Tang Contemporary Art, Beijing, China
- Drake Hotel Permanent Collection, Toronto, ON
- Collection of Library and Archives Canada, Ottawa, ON
