= Pi (art project) =

Art installation about the number π

Coordinates: 48°12′04″N 16°22′00″E

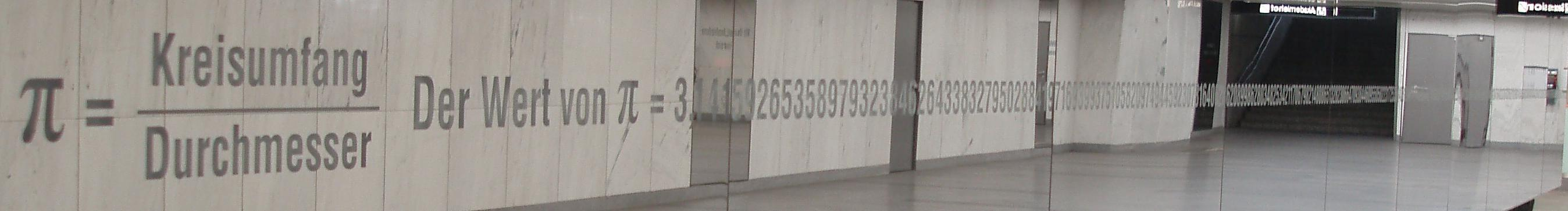
The π circular number in the Vienna Opera House Passage

Pi is the name of a multimedia installation in the vicinity of the Viennese Karlsplatz. Pi is located in the Opernpassage between the entrance to the subway and the subway stop in Secession near the Naschmarkt. The individual behind the project was the Canadian artist Ken Lum from Vancouver.

Pi, under construction from January 2005 to November 2006 and opened in December 2006, consists of statistical information and a representation of π to 478 decimal places. A more recent project is the calculation of the decimal places of π, indicating the importance of the eponymous media for installation of their number and infinity.

The exhibit is 130 meters long. In addition to the number pi, there is a total of 16 factoids of reflective display cases that convey a variety of statistical data in real time. Apart from the World population there are also topics such as the worldwide number of malnourished children and the growth of Sahara since the beginning of the year. Even less serious issues such as the number of eaten Wiener Schnitzels in Vienna of the given year and the current number of lovers in Vienna are represented.

In the middle of the passage standing there is a glass case with images, texts and books on the subjects of population and migration.

The scientific data were developed jointly by Ken Lum and the SORA Institute. "Pi" is to show that contemporary art is in a position to connect art to science, architecture and sociology. The aim of this project was to transform the Karlsplatz into a "vibrant place to meet, with communicative artistic brilliance."
