= Adichunchanagiri Institute of Technology =

Engineering college in Karnataka, India

- Motto: Knowledge is Power
- Type: Private
- Established: 1980
- Affiliations: Visvesvaraya Technological University
- Principal: Dr. Goutham M A
- Director: Dr. C. K. Subbaraya
- Administrative staff: 102
- Location: Chikkamagaluru, Karnataka, India; 13°20′28.9″N 75°47′48.4″E
- Campus: 57 acres (0.2 km^{2})
- Approvals: AICTE
- Website: aitckm.in

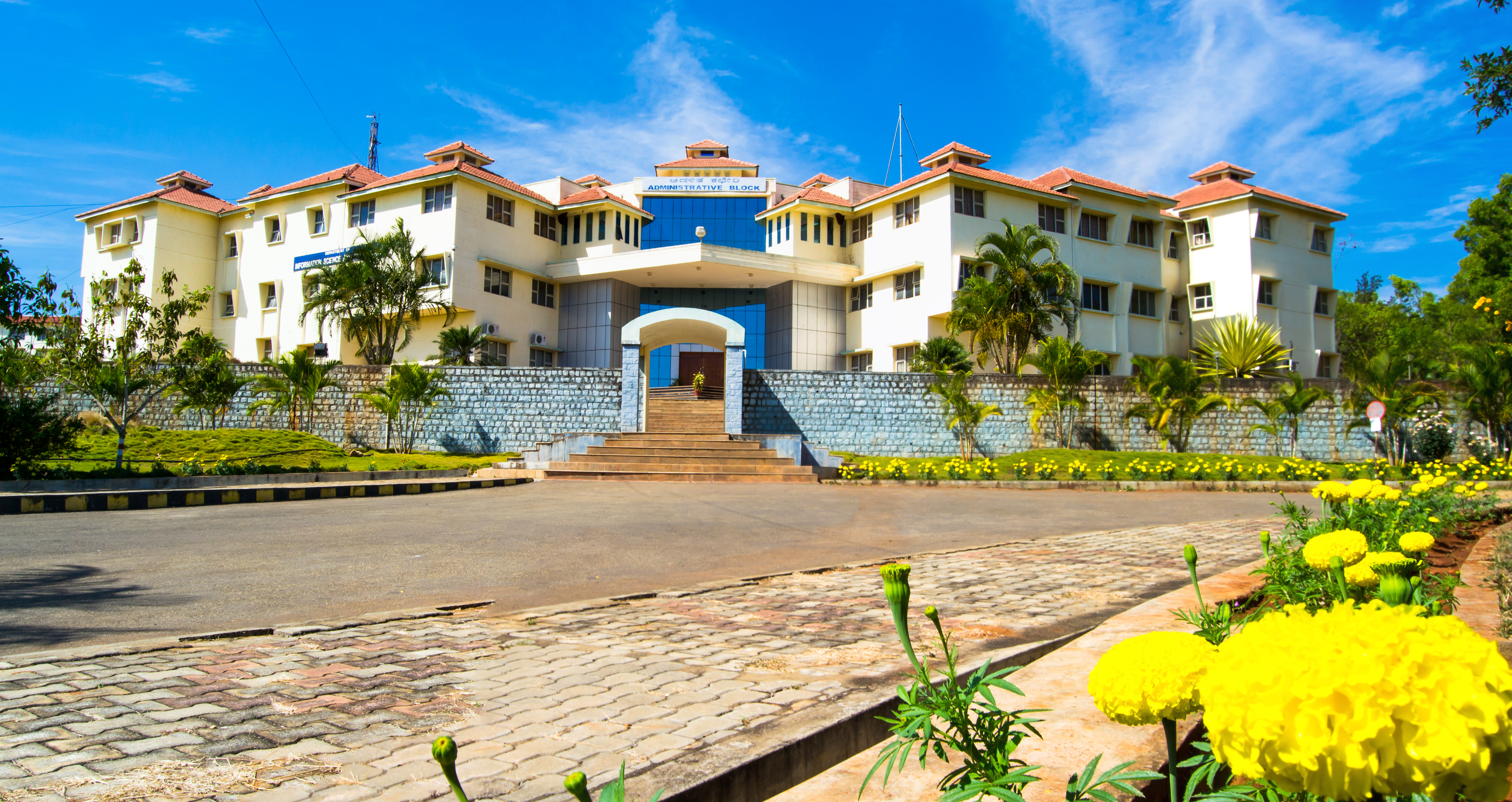
Adichunchanagiri Institute of Technology, Admin Block

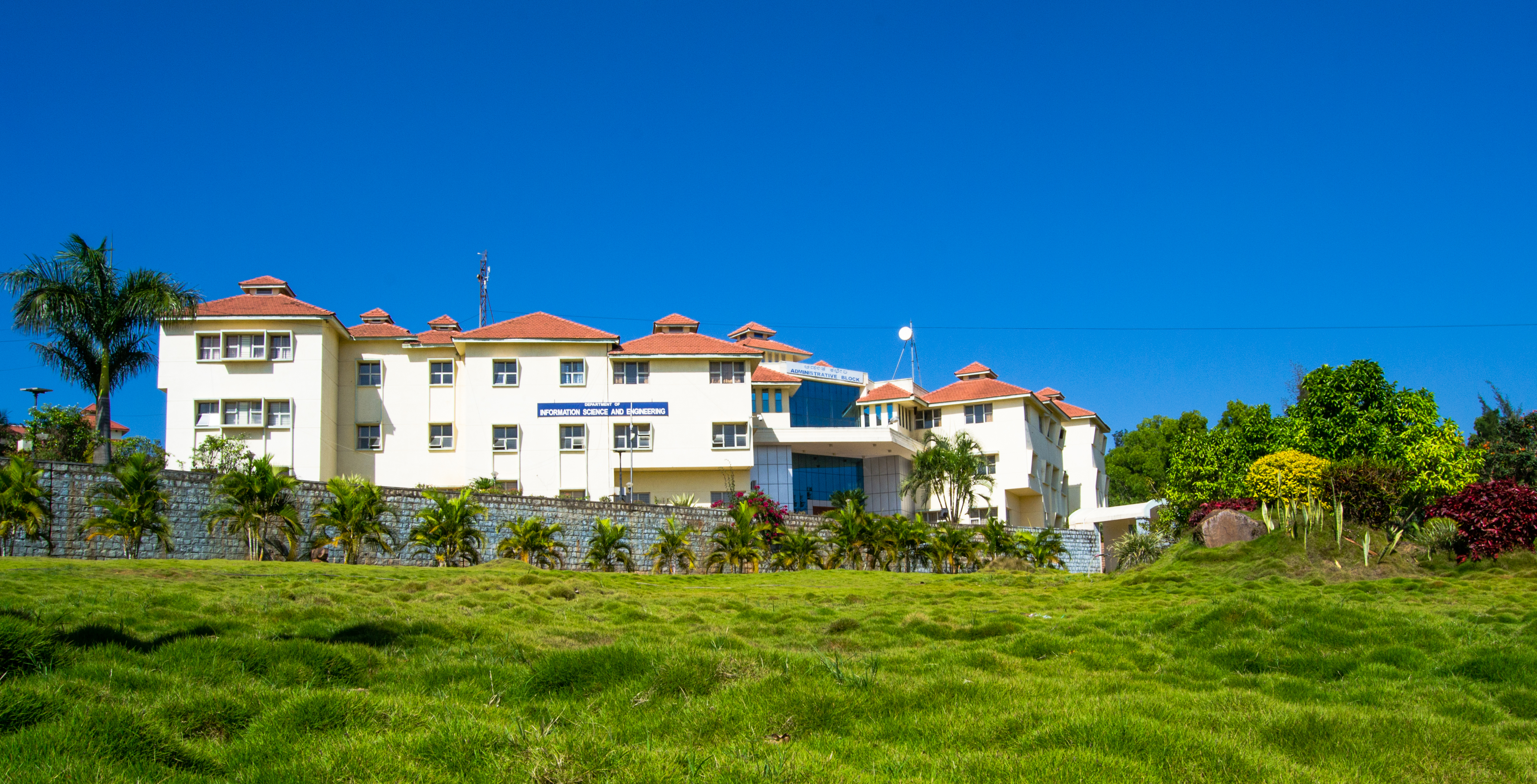
Side view of Department of Information Science and Engineering and Admin Block, AIT

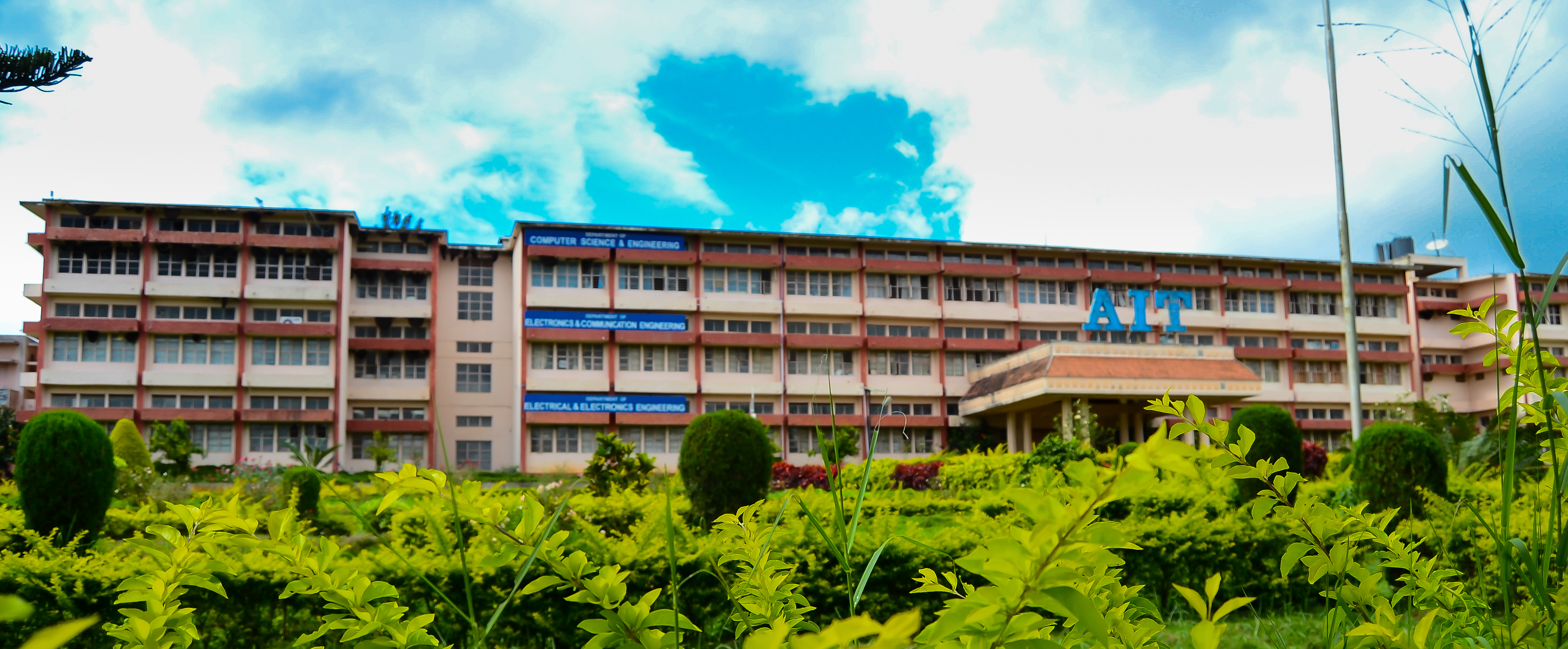
Electronics and Electrical, Computer Science and Engineering and Electrical and Electronics Block of AIT college

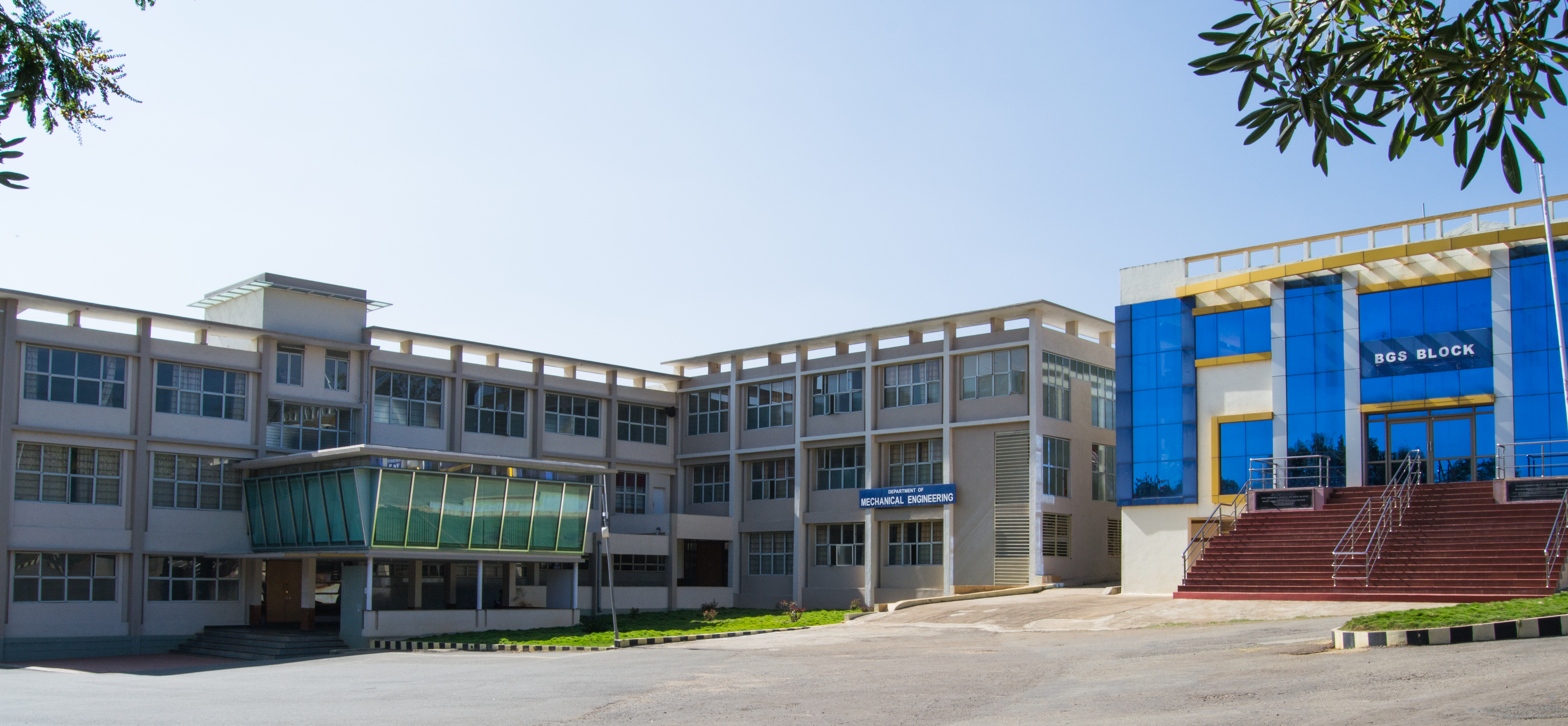
BGS-1, Civil engineering & Mechanical Engineering block in AIT, Chikkamagaluru

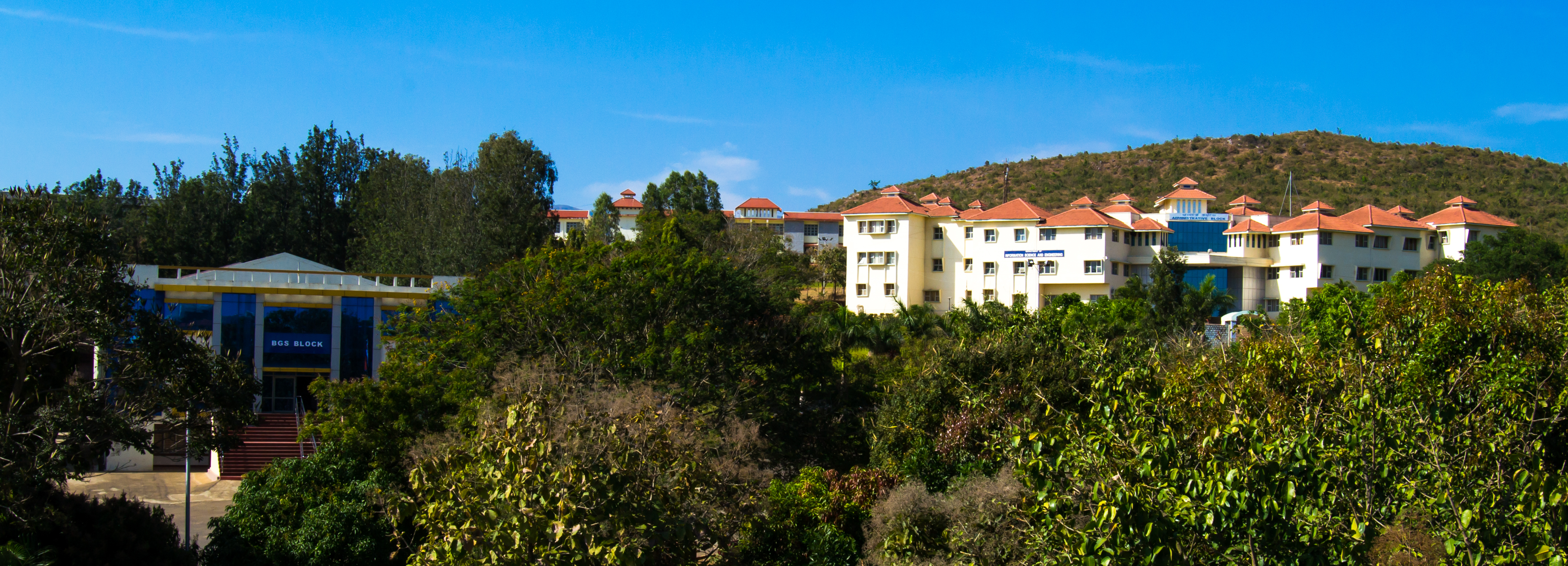
Bird's eye view of BGS-1 and Admin block of AIT, CHikkamagaluru

Adichunchanagiri Institute of Technology (AIT) is an engineering college in Chikkamagaluru, Karnataka, India. It was founded in 1980 by Sri Adichunchanagiri Maha Samsthana Math. The college was initially affiliated during inception to the University of Mysore; in 1991 the college was re-affiliated to Kuvempu University when that university came into existence. It is currently affiliated to Visvesvaraya Technological University.

== Notable alumni ==
This is a list of notable alumni who have excelled in engineering and other fields:

- Ashwin Karthik, born with cerebral palsy, became the first quadriplegic student in India to become a computer science engineering graduate. He is also the winner of a national scholarship for his engineering studies, which is awarded to only one physically challenged student in the entire country of India; National Award as 'Best Physically Challenged Individual in India' by the National Trust; in 2010 and National Award for the Empowerment of Persons with Disabilities, which was conferred by the President of India, Pranab Mukherjee at Vigyan Bhavan, New Delhi on 3 December 2013.
