= Deborah Hoch-Pfleiderer =

Missionary wife in India (1860–1945)

- Carte de visite from the studio of Friedrich Brandseph, Stuttgart, c. 1880
- Born: Deborah Pfleiderer; 23 September 1860; Mangalore, India
- Died: 9 March 1945 (aged 84); Basel, Switzerland
- Occupation: Missionary wife
- Spouse: Mark Hoch (died 1926)
- Children: 7
- Parents: Gottlob Pfleiderer (father); Johanna Katharina Werner (mother)

Deborah Hoch-Pfleiderer, born Deborah Pfleiderer (23 September 1860 – 9 March 1945), was a missionary's wife in southern India. Born in Mangalore to a couple from Württemberg working for the Basel Mission, she went to southern India in 1881 as a "mission bride" to marry the theologian Mark Hoch. She taught Indian girls and did missionary work among Indian women. From 1899 she lived in Zurich and from 1906 in Basel.

== Early life and education ==
Deborah Pfleiderer was the eldest of 15 children of a couple from Württemberg, and she spent her first years in southern India. Her father, the merchant Gottlob Pfleiderer, was in charge of the Basel Mission's weaving mills, joineries, and brickworks, which provided work for local people who had converted to Christianity. Her mother, Johanna Katharina née Werner, had come to India as a "mission bride" (Missionsbraut) to marry a missionary, and she taught handicrafts to Indian girls. In accordance with the Basel Mission's children's regulations (Kinderverordnung) of 1853, her parents sent her to Europe for her schooling at the age of six, together with her sister Friederike Pfleiderer. The sisters lived first with their grandparents in Ludwigsburg in Württemberg, and then in the Basel Mission's children's home (Kinderhaus) in Basel, established in 1859. In their Pietist upbringing, discipline, order, obedience, and piety came first. Deborah Pfleiderer then attended a public girls' secondary school (Höhere Töchterschule) in Basel for a year, and afterwards worked as a household help for relatives in Württemberg until her parents returned from India in 1879 and settled in Basel.

== Marriage and work in India ==
Deborah Hoch-Pfleiderer (front row, second from right) and her husband Mark Hoch (third from right) in a group photograph of the Basel Mission in Mangalore, c. 1888

Like her mother before her, and after initial misgivings, Deborah Pfleiderer traveled to southern India in 1881 as a mission bride to marry the theologian Mark Hoch, whom she knew only from letters. Hoch, the son of a missionary family, had been born in India; the marriage was arranged by his uncle, a pastor in Basel. In Mangalore, her birthplace, Deborah Hoch-Pfleiderer ran a large household and looked after the farming and livestock that belonged to it. Having learned the regional languages Kannada and Tulu as a child, she could communicate well. She taught Indian girls and took over the infant school (Kleinkinderschule) that her mother had set up.

She held the status of a missionary's wife: the Basel Mission used the feminine term Missionarin only for unmarried women working for the mission, which itself became possible only from the beginning of the 20th century. She visited Indian women and discussed questions of faith with them, with the aim of winning them over to Christianity. She condemned widow burning (sati), which was still practiced in places at the time. She cared for the sick at the mission station and helped her husband, who taught at the catechists' seminary, with his writing work. Each of her seven children was sent to Europe on reaching school age.

== Later life ==
In 1899 the family left India and moved to Zurich, where Mark Hoch held a post as pastor, and in 1906 to Basel. There Hoch taught prospective missionaries at the mission house, while Deborah Hoch-Pfleiderer was active in charitable women's work in the church. After her husband's death in 1926 she lived with one of her daughters in Basel.

== Assessment ==
Deborah Hoch-Pfleiderer was the second of five generations of mission brides in her family. Her biography is representative of the demands that the Basel Mission placed on missionaries' wives: unlike the male missionaries, they were to subordinate themselves to the missionary task without any preparation, to support their husbands, and at the same time to create their own fields of activity, for example by teaching local girls and women and doing missionary work among them. Without fundamentally questioning the existing power relations, Hoch-Pfleiderer sought to improve the situation of Indian women through education.

== Bibliography ==
- D. Konrad, Missionsbräute. Pietistinnen des 19. Jahrhunderts in der Basler Mission, 2001 (4th ed. 2013)
- R. Gläsle, Pauline und ihre Töchter. "Missionsbräute" als lebenslange WegGefährtinnen Basler Missionare in Indien und China, 2009
- D. Konrad, Missionskinder. Migration und Trennung in Missionarsfamilien der Basler Mission des 19. Jahrhunderts, 2023

=== Archives ===
- Archiv Basler Mission, Basel, "Erinnerungen aus meinem Leben. Von Frau Pfarrerin Debora Hoch-Pfleiderer"
- Staatsarchiv Basel-Stadt, Basel, Mark Hoch-Pfleiderer an Debora Hoch-Pfleiderer (beide in Indien), 1882–1885; Mark Hoch-Pfleiderer an Debora Hoch-Pfleiderer (beide in Indien), 1891–1898
