= Hock (surname) =

Hock is a surname. Notable people with the surname include:

- Adam Hock (born 1964), American businessman
- Christian Hock (born 1970), German footballer and manager
- Dee Hock (1929–2022), American businessman
- Gareth Hock (born 1983), English rugby league player
- Hans Henrich Hock (born 1938), American linguist
- Robert Hock (born 1973), German ice hockey player
