= Ait, Uttar Pradesh =

Town in Uttar Pradesh, India

Ait is a small town located in Jalaun district of Uttar Pradesh.

It is located 23 km from Orai city and 90 km from the city of Jhansi.

== Geography ==
Ait is located at 25°53′20″N 79°14′27″E. The average elevation is 135 metres above sea level. It is located in the Bundelkhand region of Uttar Pradesh.

== Climate ==
Ait has a composite climate, with high temperatures during the summer and lower temperatures in winter. Relative humidity remains about 50–80 RH. The climate is characterized by a hot dry summer April to early June which also features frequent storms. The rainy season is from June to September while winter spans from September to February. The maximum temperature recorded is 42 C. December is the coldest month where the temperature may drop as low as 7 C.

== Demographics ==
Ait has a population of 12,586 of which 6,706 are males while 5,880 are females as per the Population Census of 2011. There are 1,588 children which make up 12.62% of the total population of village. Average Sex Ratio of Ait is 877 which is lower than Uttar Pradesh state average of 912. Child Sex Ratio for Ait as per census is 857, lower than Uttar Pradesh average of 902. Ait has a higher literacy rate compared to Uttar Pradesh. In 2011, the literacy rate in Ait was 81.19% compared to 67.68% in Uttar Pradesh. In Ait male literacy stands at 88.77% while the female literacy rate was 72.57%. Ait has a substantial population of Schedule Caste. The Schedule Caste (SC) constitutes 26.51% while the Schedule Tribe (ST) were 0.29% of the total population in Ait.

Particulars	Total	Male	Female
Total No. of Houses	2,141	-	-
Population	12,586	6,706	5,880
Child (0–6)	1,588	855	733
Schedule Caste	3,337	1,793	1,544
Schedule Tribe	36	20	16
Literacy	81.19%	88.77%	72.57%
Total Workers	3,931	3,324	607
Main Worker	2,988	0	0
Marginal Worker	943	653	290

== Transportation ==
=== Railway ===
AIT is often credited with having the smallest railway junction in India. Ait railway station is located on Jhansi-Kanpur Railway line. It is well connected by railways to major cities like Jhansi, Lucknow, Kanpur, Ahmedabad, and Mumbai by direct trains. Major trains like the Kushinagar Express, Gwalior-Barauni mail, Sabarmati express, Jhansi-Lucknow intercity express, etc. have halts at Ait Railway station.

=== Roads ===
Ait is well connected to major cities like Jhansi, Lucknow, Kanpur, etc. by road and is connected to other cities by NH 27. Uttar Pradesh Parivahan Nigam (UPPN) runs a large number of buses to connect Ait with different cities.

== Governance ==
As per constitution of India, Ait is governed as Nagar Panchayat. Ait is in Jalaun district of Uttar Pradesh. It is divided into 10 wards

== Education ==
The number of school and colleges in Ait has increased substantially in recent years. Seth Bhagwati prasad inter college and Ram Lakhan degree college, Babu ram inter college, Janta inter college are some of educational points in Ait. However students prefer to go to cities like Jhansi, Orai Kanpur, etc. for studies.

== Accommodation ==
There are various Dharmashalas (small houses rented at low price with limited luxury) available to accommodate visitors as well as a small number of hotels.
