= Asia Culture Center =

Asia Culture Center (ACC) 국립아시아문화전당
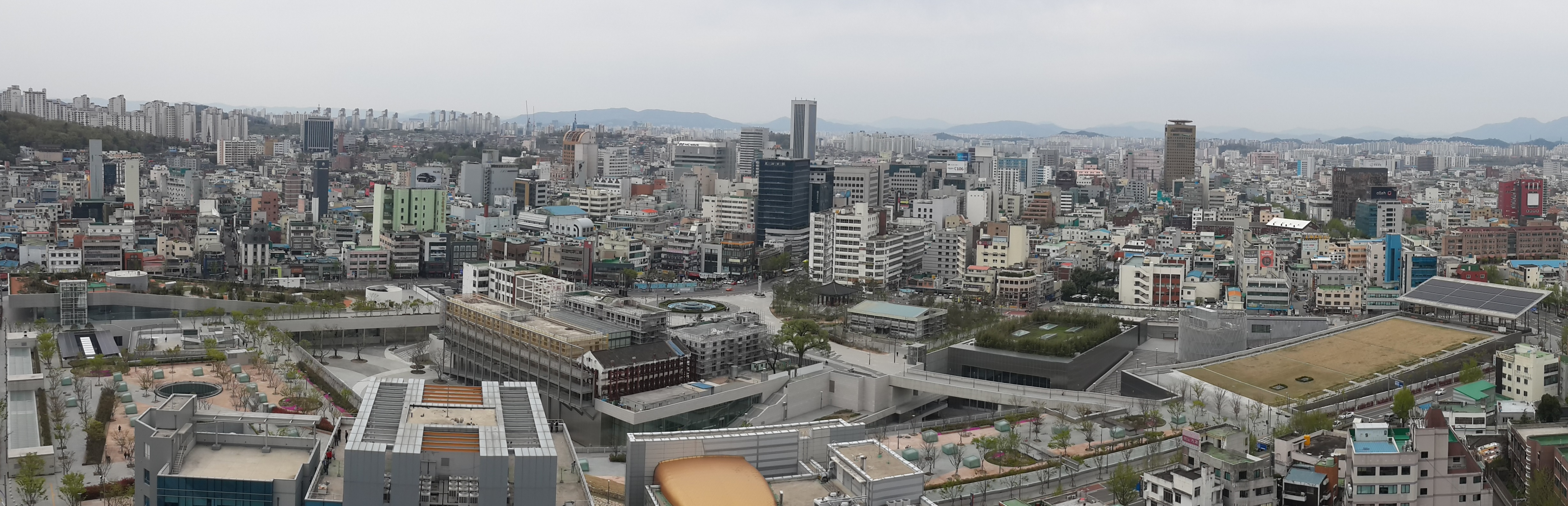
- Established: 2015
- Location: 38 Munhwajeondang-ro, Dong-gu; Gwangju, South Korea
- Coordinates: 35°08′50″N 126°55′14″E
- Type: Art center
- Website: acc.go.kr/en

- Asia Culture Center
- Hangul: 국립아시아문화전당
- Hanja: 國立아시아文化殿堂
- RR: Gungnip Asia munhwa jeondang
- MR: Kungnip Asia munhwa chŏndang

outside

The Asia Culture Center, also referred to as ACC, is located in Gwangju, South Korea. It was opened in November 2015 after more than 10 years of planning and development. The opening was attended by 700 people, including South Korean Prime Minister Hwang Kyo-ahn. It consists of five main buildings: the ACC Culture Exchange; the ACC Children; the ACC Archive & Research; the ACC Creation; and the ACC Theater. The center is a member of South Korea's Ministry of Culture, Sports and Tourism(MCST). The Center was established for the advancement of understanding and cooperation between different Asian countries.

The Asia Culture Center serves as a hub promoting Asian culture, as well as a space to research and exchange cultural communication. This mission is completed through programs including exhibitions, performances, education, and other events. The Center includes extensive archives within its Asia Culture Research Institute located within the complex. The ACC also hosts festivals each Spring and Fall. Artists from different countries are invited each year to participate in the ACC Creators Residence. This experimental platform focuses on combining art with technology, and showcases the future of Asian art. The November 2024 ACC Creators Residence featured a dozen artists from eight countries including Korea, Japan, and China.

The selection of Gwangju as the location for the Asia Culture Center was considered controversial because the city does not have any historic links to heritage sites or cultural significance related to art. The ACC location and design is a tribute to the 1980 Gwangju Uprising, also known as the May 18 Democratization Movement. The main building is the form South Jeolla provincial office, a significant location related to the movement. Construction of the Asian Culture Center was delayed for several years due to complaints from the local Gwangju community. Residents, families of victims, and organizations related to the May 18 Democratization Movement felt that the development of the ACC did not honor the original promises of preserving the legacy of the Movement. They opposed the original construction plans that would have demolished key sites related to the Movement. Additionally, locals felt that their opinions were not valued throughout the process. As a compromise, the original architecture was preserved for the above ground buildings to keep the movement's spirit alive for future generations. Newer buildings were created underground to expand the complex. In total, the Asia Culture Center is the largest cultural complex in South Korea.

Between 2015 and 2020, the ACC recorded more than 10 million total visitors and hosted 894 programs. It also collected 170,000 pieces of data and produced 115 research findings during the time period. 667 Korean and foreign experts have taken part in the creation of these programs. The Asia Culture Center has established itself as the window to Asian culture.
