= Gottfried Höch =

German politician (1800–1872)

Heinrich Gottfried Höch

Chairman of the City Council of Ludwigshafen
- In office August 28, 1849 – 1853
- Monarch: Maximilian II of Bavaria
- Succeeded by: 1853–1862: Heinrich Wilhelm Lichtenberger (1811-1872)

Personal details
- Born: January 1, 1800 Mannheim
- Died: April 12, 1872 (aged 72) Munich
- Resting place: 5 - 5 – 56 Alter Südfriedhof
- Spouse: Henriette Wilhelmine Höch
- Children: Heinrich Theodor Höch
- Parent: Grand Ducal official (father)

Gottfried Höch (1800-1872) was chairman of the first Legal City Council of Ludwigshafen.

Hoech was the eldest son of a Grand Ducal official and had purposefully gained a respected position in the Baden administration as an expert on municipal finances. In 1841 he was Baden court economist in Mannheim and acquired on the Mannheimer Rheinschanze a Land lot, where in 1846 he built a house.

On July 15, 1849 at the end of the Hecker uprising, during the Battle of Ludwigshafen democratic forces destroyed the warehouses by a cannonade. August 28, 1849 Höch became chairman of the Local Commission of Ludwigsburg, which reached that the damages of the cannonade of Ludwigshafen, were compensated by the Kingdom of Bavaria.
