= Adolf Hoch =

Austrian architect

Olympic medal record

Art competitions
Gold medal – first place	1948 London	Architectural design

Opernpassage, a pedestrian underpass near the State Opera in Vienna, designed by architect Adolf Hoch 1954-1955

Adolf Hoch (June 17, 1910 – May 24, 1992) was an Austrian architect. He was born in Winterberg, Austrian-Hungarian Empire.

In 1948 he won a gold medal in the art competitions of the Olympic Games for his "Skisprungschanze auf dem Kobenzl" ("Ski jumping hill on the Kobenzl"). Hoch was the last Austrian gold medalist in art competition.

He was the architect of the Opernpassage in Vienna, a pedestrian underpass of the most busy crossroads of the city near the opera house. It was built in 1955 and opened on 4 November 1955, one day before the reopening of the Vienna State Opera after World War II. Since then it has been a symbol of the modern spirit in architecture and urban planning in Vienna. Cooperating with the Federal Office for the Protection of Monuments in Austria the City of Vienna undertook a complete restoration of the structure, which was reopened on 17 September 2013.

After the completion of the Opernpassage Hoch was asked to design three other pedestrian passages below ground crossing the Vienna Ring Road. Between 1961 and 1964 the Bellariapassage, the Babenbergerpassage and the Albertinapassage were built. The Bellariapassage now connects to the Vienna U-Bahn, the other two lost their function and are used as party locations since the turn of the millennium.
