= Heinrich Theodor Höch =

German businessman

- Born: June 27, 1845; Mannheim
- Died: April 8, 1905 (aged 59); Munich
- Resting place: 5 – 5 – 56 Alter Südfriedhof
- Known for: real estate
- Father: Gottfried Höch (1800–1872)

Heinrich Theodor Höch was a German businessman.

Höch grew up in Ludwigshafen, then part of the Kingdom of Bavaria. In 1864, at the age of 19, Höch began his first venture which was to export Palatine tobacco to the Union during the American Civil War. When the war ended, Höch filed for bankruptcy. He continued to trade goods and acted as a broker.

Höch entered the rail industry in the 1860s as a co-accordant in the construction of the Munich–Rosenheim railway line. Höch's businesses were successful in this era. In 1866, he moved to Munich where he dedicated himself to general trade and finance, from suspenders and walking sticks to investments in real estate business.

== Early life ==
Höch grew up in Ludwigshafen, then part of the Kingdom of Bavaria. His father, Gottfried Höch, was the éminence grise in the founding of the community of Ludwigshafen and the economist show managed the estates of Stéphanie de Beauharnais.

== Business career ==
=== Maxvorstadt ===
Höch's understood the needs of urban housing and he partly managed to maintain such projects until they broke even.

As a land owner, Höch could not compete with the Munich breweries' and the Catholic Church's monopoly. Höch was good with people and was able to convince investors to fund his projects. Because during the late 1880s nearby Schwabing had electric street lights and had rapid population and economic growth, it was common to sell residences in Maxvorstadt as quasi-Schwabing.

Over the years, Höch built entire streets. He was particularly involved in the emergence of the artists' quarter in Maxvorstadt (new Schwabing) and large sections to the west located between the streets of Schwabingerlandstraße (today's Leopoldstraße) and [[Schleißheimer Straße (Munich)]|Schleißheimer Straße]]. Höch donated a space at the center of the area for the construction of the new St. Ursula (München), built by August Thiersch between 1894 and 1897.

After the Panic of 1873, Höch started his first big venture. He built buildings along all of the Heßstraße and lived at number 46. A neighboring house collapsed and caused the entire area to be discredited for five to six years as a neighborhood of dodgy buildings. At the foreclosure sale of about 40 properties, Höch's debts amounted to more than one million. He went bankrupt for the second time.

=== Dairy farm ===
In 1875, Höch opened a dairy farm in the Heßstraße, which was still undeveloped at the time and bought the first four of twenty cows. At the dairy, he also produced child milk (pasteurized milk), a novelty found by Franz von Soxhlet. In 1877, Höch acquired citizenship and the right to live in Munich for DM 171 (marks), the German currency used at that time, which equals around $2,000 USD today.

=== Volksgarten Nymphenburg ===
In 1890, he founded and financed the Volksgarten Nymphenburg with Hugo Oertel.

=== Project Tuberculosis spa cure ===
Although he was dodging creditors in 1891, he sought to open a spa to cure tuberculosis. Höch pursued this plan by acquiring the Palais Gumpenberg on Ottostraße 6. According to his will, he wanted to offer a spa cure for pulmonary patients using the healing serum developed by Robert Koch. His idea failed because residents resisted and in 1892 the Palais Bumpenberg became the Hotel Continental, where Rainer Maria Rilke later would stay.

=== Project Septic drain fields in Großlappen ===
With astonishing foresight, Höch planned the planting of septic drain fields in the north of Munich at Großlappen.

=== Investments ===
Höch acquired extensive land in parts of Munich like Nymphenburg, Obersendling, and Menzing. He had a copper mine in the Rhön and acquired plantations overseas. He funded balloon projects, and founded magazines and a shoe factory.

=== Project industrial district Freimann ===
Höch tried to establish an industrial district in Freimann. Following the pattern of Heilmann & Littmann's Industrieviertel on the Sendlinger Oberfeld, he planned the construction of an industrial district in northern Schwabing at the direction of Freimann. He had already acquired 1,000 Tagewerk reason. He was ruined again because authorities opposed his plan and because his bad business practices did not keep pace with reality. During this time, half pages with the court auction announcements of Höch's property often appeared in Münchner Neueste Nachrichten.

=== Third and last bankruptcy ===
Finally, in 1904, Höch's empire broke, which greatly boosted the city's economy. It was Höch's third and last bankruptcy and, at the time, the largest bankruptcy in Munich—428 appointments in front of the chamber of commerce.

A creditor consortium summoned Höch to declare his bankruptcy. Höch confessed that he had a spinal cord condition which made him unable to give exhaustive information about his entire estate. The consortium accepted this as credible.

== Later life and death ==
The last photographic portrait of Höch shows a man affected by illness, whose eyes look tired and inward. Once Munich's most daring construction and land speculation entrepreneur, Höch died a bachelor on April 8, 1905, in his last apartment on Franz Josef Straße 27.
