= Hock Mountain =

Mountain in Washington (state), United States

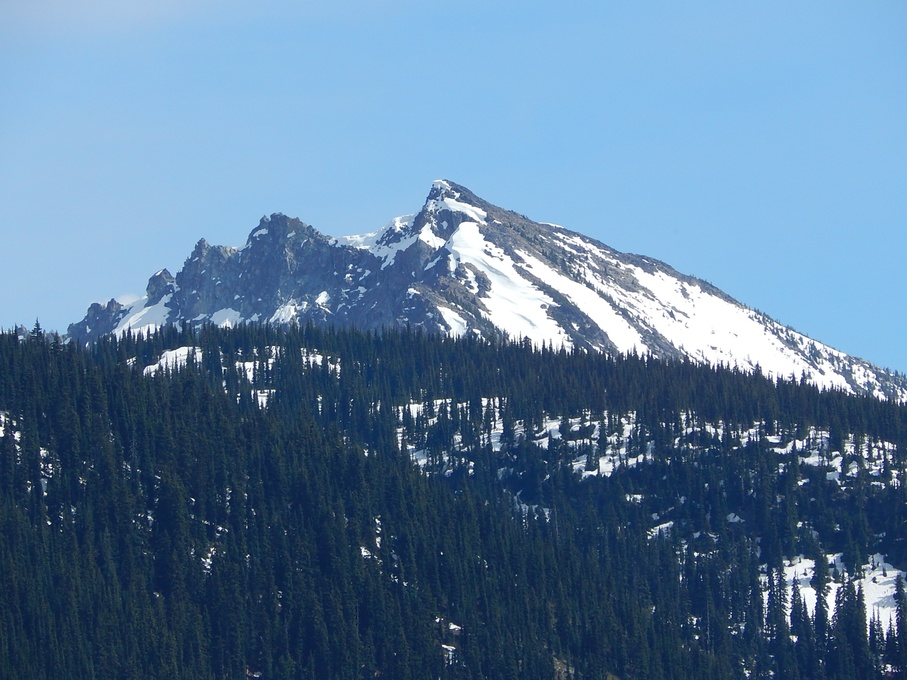
- Northwest aspect beyond the forested ridge

Highest point
- Elevation: 7,750 ft (2,362 m)
- Prominence: 790 ft (241 m)
- Parent peak: Mother Lode (7,905 ft)
- Isolation: 2.43 mi (3.91 km)
- Coordinates: 48°27′05″N 120°40′02″W

Geography
- Location within Washington (state) Location within the United States
- Interactive map of Hock Mountain
- Country: United States
- State: Washington
- County: Chelan / Okanogan
- Protected area: Lake Chelan-Sawtooth Wilderness
- Parent range: Cascade Range; North Cascades; Methow Mountains
- Topo map: USGS McAlester Mountain

Geology
- Rock age: Late Cretaceous
- Rock type: Tonalitic plutons

Climbing
- Easiest route: scrambling

Hock Mountain is a 7,750-foot-elevation (2,360-meter) summit located in the Methow Mountains which are a subset of the North Cascades in Washington state. It is situated on the triple-shared boundary of North Cascades National Park, Lake Chelan-Sawtooth Wilderness, and Lake Chelan National Recreation Area, as well as the shared border between Chelan County and Okanogan County. Additionally, it lies one mile southwest of Twisp Mountain, and 2.24 miles (3.60 km) due south of Stiletto Peak, the nearest higher neighbor. The north face is steep, granitic rock, but the west slope is more moderate, allowing a scramble ascent. Precipitation runoff from the north and west sides of Hock drains to the Stehekin River via Bridge Creek, whereas the south and east sides of the mountain drain into the South Fork Twisp River.

== Climate ==
Weather fronts originating in the Pacific Ocean travel east toward the Cascade Mountains. As fronts approach the North Cascades, they are forced upward by the peaks of the Cascade Range, causing them to drop their moisture in the form of rain or snowfall onto the Cascades. As a result, the west side of the North Cascades experiences high precipitation, especially during the winter months in the form of snowfall. Because of maritime influence, snow tends to be wet and heavy, resulting in avalanche danger. During winter months, weather is usually cloudy, but due to high pressure systems over the Pacific Ocean that intensify during summer months, there is often little or no cloud cover during the summer.

== Geology ==
The North Cascades features some of the most rugged topography in the Cascade Range with craggy peaks, ridges, and deep glacial valleys. Geological events occurring many years ago created the diverse topography and drastic elevation changes over the Cascade Range leading to the various climate differences. These climate differences lead to vegetation variety defining the ecoregions in this area.

The history of the formation of the Cascade Mountains dates back millions of years ago to the late Eocene Epoch. With the North American Plate overriding the Pacific Plate, episodes of volcanic igneous activity persisted. In addition, small fragments of the oceanic and continental lithosphere called terranes created the North Cascades about 50 million years ago.

During the Pleistocene period dating back over two million years ago, glaciation advancing and retreating repeatedly scoured the landscape leaving deposits of rock debris. The U-shaped cross section of the river valleys is a result of recent glaciation. Uplift and faulting in combination with glaciation have been the dominant processes which have created the tall peaks and deep valleys of the North Cascades.

== Gallery ==
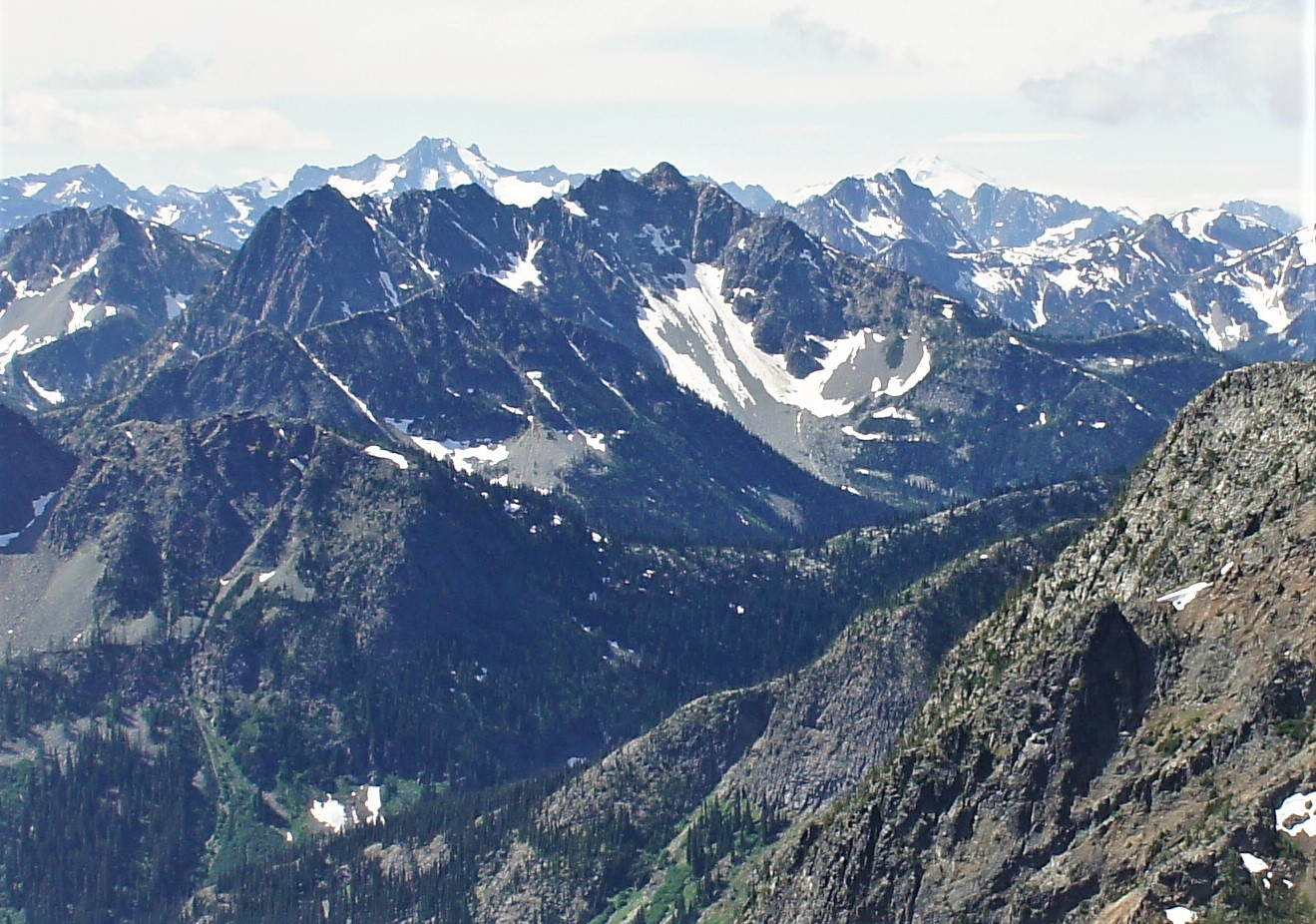
Northeast aspect seen from Kangaroo Ridge
(Twisp Mountain below left of Hock)

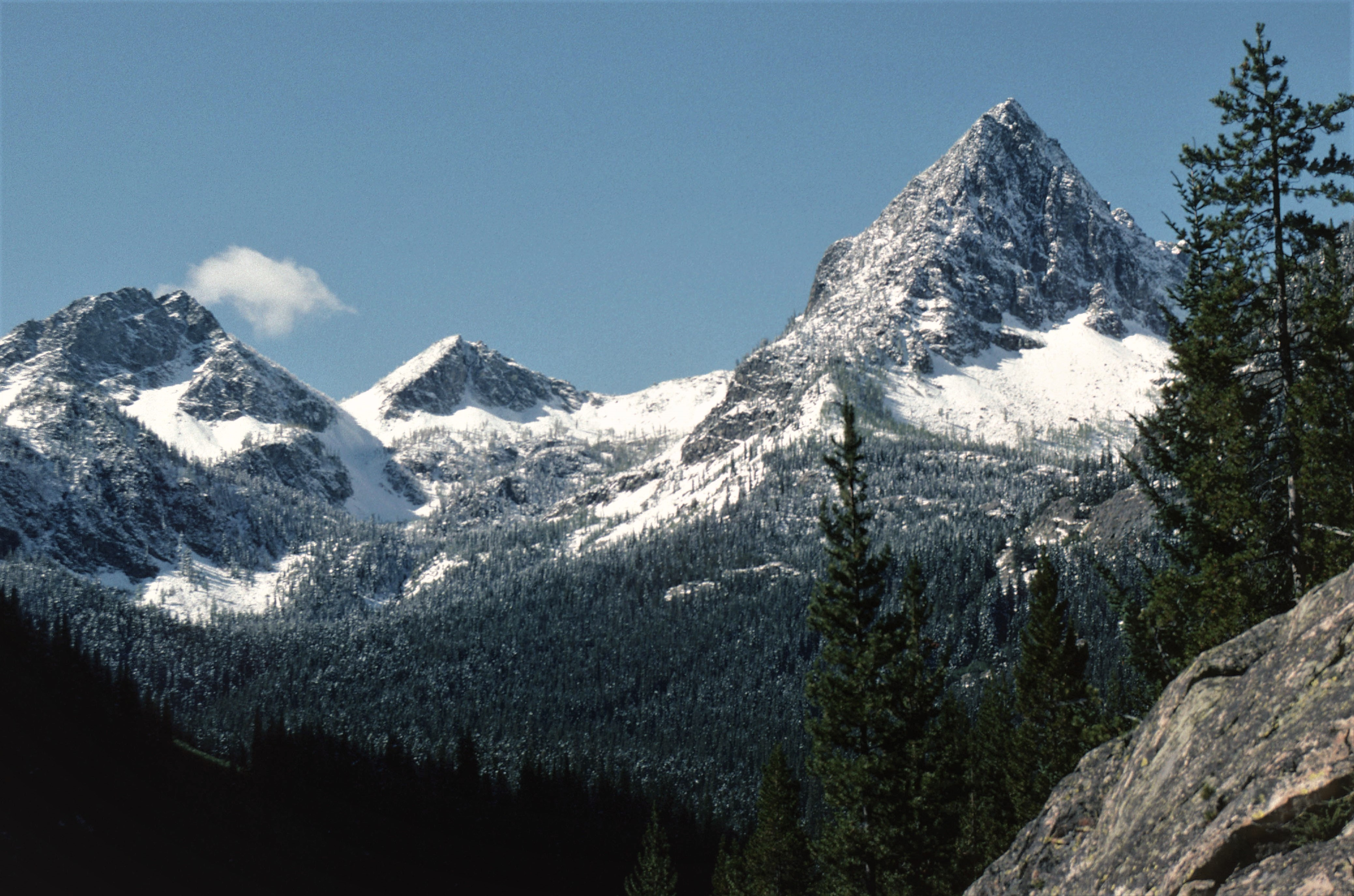
The end of Hock's east ridge (right)

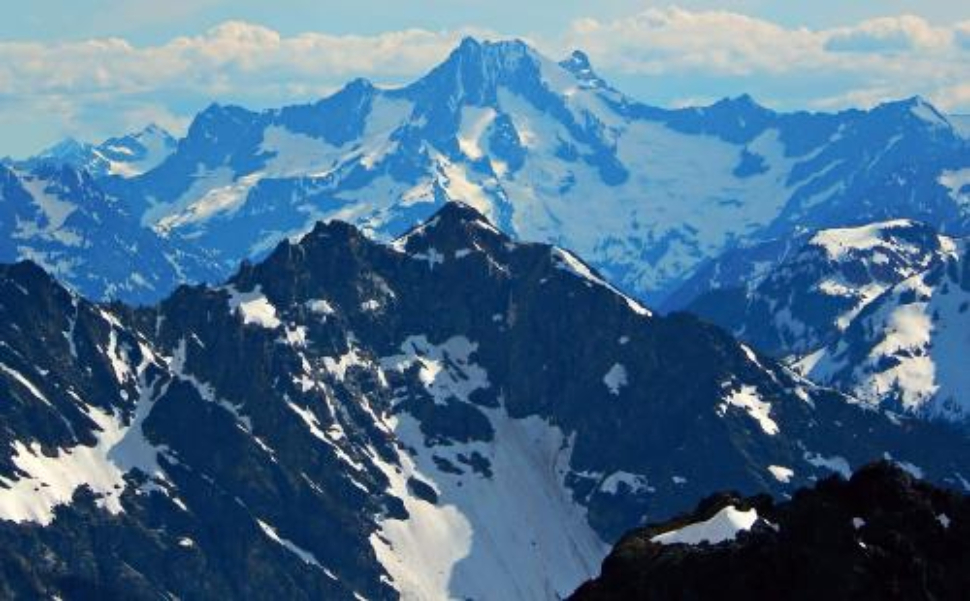
Hock (front) and Bonanza Peak (back) seen from Wallaby Peak

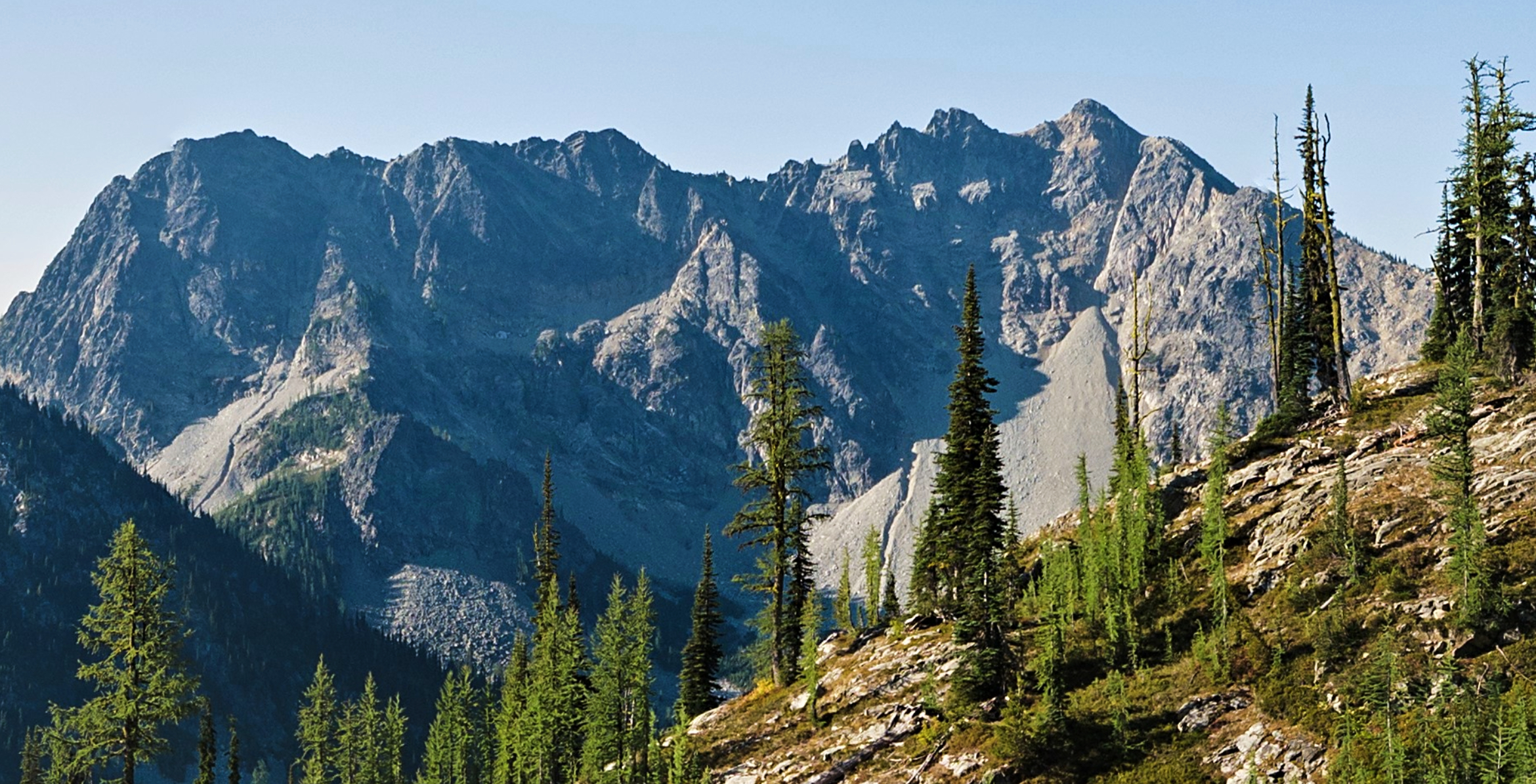

== See also ==
Geography of the North Cascades
