= Sunjung Kim =

South Korean art curator

Sunjung Kim is a Seoul-based curator and Professor at the Korea National University of Arts who has played a pivotal role in linking Korean contemporary art and the international art world.

== Early life and education ==
Kim received her B.F.A. from Ewha Womans University and her M.F.A. from Cranbrook Academy of Art, U.S.A.

== Career ==
From 1993 to 2004, Kim was the Chief Curator at Artsonje Center, Seoul. In 2005, she was the commissioner of the Korean Pavilion at the 51st Venice Biennale. Also in 2005 she founded SAMUSO: Space for Contemporary Art, a curatorial office based in Seoul. Through SAMUSO Kim established Platform Seoul, an annual art festival whose editions have included: “Somewhere in Time, (2006)”, “Tomorrow” (2007), “I have nothing to say and I am saying it” (2008), “Platform in KIMUSA: Void of Memory” (2009) and “Projected Image” (2010). She co-curated “Your Bright Future,” an exhibition of 12 contemporary artists from Korea presented at the Los Angeles County Museum of Art and Houston Museum of Fine Arts (2009–10). Kim has also curated solo exhibitions for artists such as In-Hwan Oh, Martin Creed, Beom Kim and Haegue Yang at Artsonje Center. Kim was the Artistic Director of the 6th Seoul International Media Art Biennale - Media City Seoul 2010.

Kim was a Co-Artistic Director of ROUNDTABLE: The 9th Gwangju Biennale (Korea, 2012), for which her research explored the multiple layers of histories and narratives that enclose possibilities of intimacy, autonomy and anonymity within the urban sphere.

Kim was a member of the international jury that selected Lithuania as recipient of the Golden Lion for best national participation at the Venice Biennale in 2019.

== Recognition ==
In 2013 Kim was ranked at number 94 in ArtReview Magazine's annual Power 100
