= James Hoch (microbiologist) =

James A. Hoch is an American microbiologist who is the head of the Division of Cellular Biology in the Department of Molecular and Experimental Medicine at the Scripps Research Institute.

Hoch received a Ph.D. from the University of Illinois, Urbana, in 1965. In the last 40 years his work has focused on dissecting the signal transduction mechanism that controls sporulation in Bacillus subtilis. He introduced the widely used phrase 'phosphorelay' to describe the transfer of phosphoryl groups between the two proteins involved in bacterial signal transduction that comprise the so-called two-component system.
