= Arts Initiative Tokyo =

Arts organisation based in Tokyo, Japan

Arts Initiative Tokyo (AIT) a small not-for-profit independent organisation based in Tokyo, Japan. AIT was registered as a non profit organisation (NPO) by the City of Tokyo in May 2002. Their ethos is to nurture more bottom-up programs in order to contribute and encourage art in new ways for broad audiences. Positioning itself as a vital alternative centre for the arts in Japan, the organisation works with local contexts to consider global issues and perspectives.

In 2006, AIT was also invited by The Japanese Foundation as an external arts organisation to be the commissioner of artists at 12th Bangladesh Biennale. This event represents a break with past practices of asking museum professionals to curate artists and echoes the broader atmosphere which grassroots community art initiatives and non-profit sectors have emerged. AIT has selected Hiroshi Fuji and Teruya Yuken as the representative for Japan in 2006.

Currently, AIT runs an independent education program called Make Art Different (MAD), a residency program as well as curatorial/consultancy projects partnering with business.

== Organisation structure ==
It was founded in 2001 by six curators and arts administrators: Yuko Ozawa (Director), Yoko Miyahara (Mori Art Museum), Keisuke Ozawa (independent curator, Associate Director Art Fair Tokyo, lecturer Joshibi), Yasu Nakamori (Curator, Lecturer, Houston), Fumihiko Sumitomo (independent curator) and Roger McDonald (independent curator, lecturer Meiji University, Joshibi).

== Education Program: MAD- Making Art Different ==
Making Art Different is the educational component of AIT. The courses are open to all and aim to broaden the appeal of modern and contemporary art in Japan through low cost, small scale and in-depth lectures. It offered the first course in curatorial studies in Japan in 2001. In 2011 MAD ceased offering courses and instead initiated a flexible, self-selecting system in which students purchase numbers of lectures to create their own course of study. 111 lectures are offered in 2011.

== Artist Residence Program ==
AIT has hosted artists, curators and writers for one to three month residencies in Tokyo. The residency program is not an open application one, instead operating on a partnership model, with various international arts organisations and Japanese Foundations. Since 2003, AIT has invited over 20 partners for the residency.

Collaborator list in chronological order:

- IASPIS, Sweden (2003~)

-Toyota Foundation, Japan (2004)

-Asia Link, Australia (2004, 2005)

-Ssamzie Space, Korea (2004, 2005)

-FRAME, Finland (2004, 2006 – 2008, 2010, 2011)

-Ishibashi Foundation, Japan (2005 – 2010)

-Backers Foundation, Japan (2006~)

-Asian Cultural Council, Japan(2006)

-Mondriaan Fund, Netherlands (2006)

-Agency for Cultural Affairs, Japan (2011 – 2020)

-Cove Park, Scotland (2011, 2013, 2018, 2019)

-SOMA, Mexico (2012, 2013)

-Centre for Contemporary Art Ujazdowski Castle A-I-R Laboratory, Poland (2013, 2015)

-Camden Arts Centre, UK (2014 – 2016)

-Chiang Mai Art Conversations, Thailand (2015)

-Node Center for Curatorial Studies, Germany (2015)

-TABAKALERA. Spain (2016)

-Times Museum, China (2017, 2019)

-The Nippon Foundation, Japan (2018)

-Embassy of the Kingdom of the Netherlands, Japan (2018)

-The Fifth Season, Netherlands (2018)

-Saxony-Anhalt Arts Foundation, Germany (2018)

-Creative Residency Arita, Japan (2018)

-Japan Foundation Asia Center, Japan (2019)

-Hospitalfield, Scotland (2019)

-Bethel House, Japan (2019)

-Baltan Laboratories, Netherlands (2020)

AIT does not hold a permanent exhibition space, rather working out of an office/ classroom in the area Daikanyama of Tokyo.
