= AA Bronson =

Canadian artist (born 1946)

- Born: Michael Tims; 1946 (age 79–80); Vancouver, British Columbia, Canada
- Known for: artist, one of the founders of General Idea

AA Bronson OC RCA (born Michael Tims in Vancouver in 1946) is a Canadian artist. He was a founding member of the artists' group General Idea, was president and director of Printed Matter, Inc., and started the NY Art Book Fair and the LA Art Book Fair.

== Early life ==
Tims' father was an Air Force officer, and as a result, the family moved often; Tims spent his childhood in various places across Canada. He was an avid reader as a child, and it was through his reading habits that he explored his interest in art, architecture, spirituality and the occult, which would remain significant touchstones throughout his life and career, especially in his post-General Idea solo career.

He attended the University of Manitoba as an architecture student in the mid-1960s. He met Ron Gabe (aka Felix Partz) at the University of Manitoba. While at architecture school, he came to be interested in and involved with theories of radical education and communes. His interest in and experience with alternate methods of education began at the age of 12, where his primary school experimented with a form of self-directed learning. He, along with a group of fellow University of Manitoba students, dropped out to form a commune, whose activities included a free press (called "The Loving Couch Press") and a free school (called "The School"). It was via his activities with the Loving Couch Press that Bronson came into contact with other underground presses. This, in turn, exposed him to the Situationist International and Fluxus, which would have a significant impact on the ideas and methods pursued as part of General Idea.

In the late 1960s, Bronson trained as a facilitator in group-process for communes and cooperative communities while apprenticing with a psychologist at the University of Regina. In his role as an apprentice, he travelled across Canada, including to Simon Fraser University. At Simon Fraser, he met Brian Carpenter, who deepened his exposure to radical communication theories. He also encountered the InterMedia artist collective, and Slobodan Saia-Levy (aka Jorge Zontal).

In 1969, Bronson's involvement in communes and radical education theories and practices took him to Toronto, to investigate the Rochdale College experiment. It was through some of the members of Rochdale College that Bronson deepened his friendships with Felix Partz and Jorge Zontal (each having arrived in Toronto for different reasons). They, along with several others, became involved in the countercultural performance and "happenings" scene that centered around Toronto's Theatre Passe Muraille. Through Theatre Passe Muraille, Bronson apprenticed with Coach House Press (he also did graphic design for Passe Muraille).

== General Idea ==
The General Idea artists group, initially a loose collective of five to seven people, was founded in 1969 by Bronson, Jorge Zontal and Felix Partz, Partz's then-girlfriend Mimi Paige, and Granada Gazelle (a.k.a. Granada Venne or Sharon Venne).

Among the group's various activities, the trio founded FILE Megazine, a visual magazine, which they edited and published from 1972 until 1989. In 1974 they founded Art Metropole, an international publisher, distributor and archive of artists' books, video and multiples, which they conceived as an extension of the self-mythologization of General Idea. AA Bronson was the director of Art Metropole from 1974 through 1984, and again from 1996 through 1998.

The three worked and lived together for 25 years, until their collaboration was terminated with the death of both Zontal and Partz in 1994.

General Idea continues to exhibit internationally in private galleries and museums, as well as undertaking countless temporary public art projects around the world.

Bronson has been working independently since that time. He is currently represented by Esther Schipper, Berlin and Maureen Paley, London.

== Solo career ==
Bronson's solo artwork dealt with trauma, loss, death and healing.

While caring for friends coping with their AIDS-related illnesses, Bronson began to participate in Body Electric (and related) therapeutic massage and healing workshops and seminars in California (he partook in the first of such seminars in 1989). His initial motivation for this was to become a midwife to the dying. Over the course of the next eleven years, he would return to California to continue to take part in, and deepen his knowledge of, alternative healing and therapeutic bodywork practices.

After the deaths of Partz and Zontal, an aspect of Bronson's grief manifested as a creative crisis. His first works are, in fact, elegies both to his General Idea partners and his own identity as part of the group: a deathbed portrait of Felix Partz (Felix, June 5, 1994, 1994–1999), a triptych of Zontal shortly before his death (Jorge, February 3, 1994, 2000) and a full-body nude self-portrait in the shape of a coffin (AA Bronson, August 22, 2000, 2000).

He began working professionally as a healer initially out of personal calling, and this professional identity as a healer was soon integrated into his artistic identity. Bronson has said that he approached his identity as a healer in the same way that General Idea approached their identities as artists: the word was so overused, it had lost any particular meaning and significance, and so he was free both to assume the 'drag' of a healer, and consequently, to invest the word with his own meaning. The first expression of his healing practice as an artistic performance emerged at a solo show at the Frederic Giroux gallery in Paris in 2003.

His healing practice garnered significant attention in the press due to his inclusion of an anal massage technique, a practice he learned through a teacher Bronson met during his extensive therapeutic massage schooling in California.

In 2004, Bronson began working at Printed Matter as its director. Through his involvement in Printed Matter, he founded the NY Art Book Fair in 2005 (which in turn birthed the LA Art Book Fair). The annual NY Art Book Fair, which hosts over 200 independent presses, booksellers, antiquarian dealers, artists and publishers from twenty countries. Via his work at Printed Matter and at the Book Fairs, Bronson began to be introduced to a network of a younger generation of artists, with whom he began and continues to collaborate regularly.

A significant aspect of this collaboration took form in a series of site-specific "secret" performances entitled Invocation of the Queer Spirits, conceived in collaboration with artist Peter Hobbs. They, along with a series of select collaborators, would collectively ritually invoke the spirits of the dead in various locales. The ritual has been performed in Banff, New Orleans, Winnipeg, Governor's Island, the Fire Island Pines. These performances were always private. A book documenting this process (including its conception and photographic evidence of its remnants) was published by Creative Time in 2011. Since then, the Invocation of the Queer Spirits has been performed in Berlin and Paris, among other venues.

In 2009, Bronson enrolled as a Masters of Divinity candidate at Union Theological Seminary in the City of New York. While at Union, he co-founded the Institute for Art, Religion and Social Justice with Kathryn Reklis.

In 2013, Bronson was invited to Berlin to be a resident as part of the DAAD Berliner Kunstler program. After the course of the yearlong residency was over, he and his partner, Mark Jan Krayenhoff van de Leur, decided to remain in Berlin, where they both currently reside.

In 2021, he was one of the participants in John Greyson's experimental short documentary film International Dawn Chorus Day.

== Exhibitions ==
He had his first solo institutional exhibition outside of General Idea in 2000 at the Vienna Secession in Austria, followed closely by a solo exhibition at the Museum of Contemporary Art in Chicago (2001), a solo exhibition at the MIT List Visual Arts Center, Cambridge (2002), and another at The Power Plant in Toronto (2003) and the Morris and Helen Belkin Art Gallery, Vancouver (2004). He was featured in the Montreal and Whitney Biennials (2000 and 2002). With his partner, Mark Jan Krayenhoff van de Leur, he was one of three finalists in a public competition for a monument to homosexuals persecuted by the Nazis, for the city of Vienna, Austria.

In 2010, a Bronson aforementioned Felix, June 5, 1994 appeared in the Hide/Seek exhibit at the United States' National Portrait Gallery, but the artist sought to withdraw the work after the censorship controversy. The Bronson piece was on loan to the show "from the National Gallery of Canada. Marc Mayer, the director of the Canadian museum, urged the National Portrait Gallery to respect Mr. Bronson's wishes and remove the work but did not formally demand its return," and the National Portrait Gallery ultimately declined to remove the work.

Bronson continues to exhibit regularly. Recent exhibitions of note include The Temptation of AA Bronson at Witte de With Center for Contemporary Art Rotterdam (2013), a kind of experimental solo show which mapped Bronson's various lifelong influences and current collaborations with younger artists. In 2015, he had twin shows at the Salzburger and Grazer Kunstvereins, for which he, in collaboration with his partner Krayenhoff van de Leur and artist Adrian Hermanides, created a massive tent structure called Folly (Lana's Boudoir), which was subsequently featured in Art Basel's Unlimited exhibition in 2016. He had a major solo exhibitions at Esther Schipper Berlin, Maureen Paley (London) and at Kunstwerke Institute for Contemporary Art (Berlin) in 2018.

In 2019, he performed his Apology to Siksika Nation at the inaugural Toronto Biennial of Art. The manifold project deals with Bronson's great-grandfather, John William Tims, and the consequences of his missionary work in Siksika nation in the turn of the 20th century. The project also includes an eponymous publication.

== Curating ==
Bronson has also curated exhibitions. In the late 1970s, he curated a series of exhibitions at A Space, Toronto, including an exhibition of the multiples of Joseph Beuys. In 1984, he was co-curator of Evidence of the Avant-Garde..., Art Metropole, Toronto, a survey of artists' books, multiples, and ephemera. In 1987, he curated From Sea to Shining Sea for the Power Plant, Toronto, a history of artist-directed activity in Canada from the post-war period to 1986. In 1991, he curated Learn to Read Art, an exhibition of 287 artists' books and multiples from the permanent collection of Art Metropole presented at the Art Basel, Basel, Switzerland. In the mid-nineties, he curated a series of exhibitions for Art Metropole, including Intermedia, a look at Canada's first artist-run center. More recently, as Director of Printed Matter, Inc., New York, he has curated exhibitions related to artists' publishing, notably "I will not make any more boring art", an exhibition of books, prints and ephemera from the Nova Scotia College of Art and Design, Halifax. His exhibition, again titled Learn to Read Art, a history of Printed Matter Inc. with more than 300 publications, editions, and posters, was presented at the Museo de Arte Contemporaneo de Castilla y Leon (Seville, Spain), Badischer Kunstverein (Karlsruhe, Germany), and at MoMA PS1 in 2009.

Bronson has been deeply involved with publishing, promoting publishing activity as a primary artistic form. In 1979, he co-edited Performance by Artists with Peggy Gale for Art Metropole, Toronto. In 1983, they co-edited another resource publication, Museums by Artists, Art Metropole. In 1987, the Power Plant catalogue Sea to Shining Sea attempted to construct a history since the post-war period of artist-initiated activity in Canada, including the formation of the artist-run centers. He also published artists' books for Art Metropole by Jeff Wall, Colin Campbell, Lisa Steele, Hamish Fulton, Hans Haacke, and others, as well as conceiving the series Little Cockroach Press, of which he edited the first few issues. As director and president of Printed Matter, he has published many books, including titles by Scott Treleaven, Terence Koh, Tauba Auerbach, Martha Rosler, and Temporary Services (Chicago).

Bronson has written widely, including texts for FILE Megazine, and General Idea publications, as well as essays for art magazines and catalogues. He has published numerous artist books and projects under his own imprint, Media Guru. His own memoir, Negative Thoughts, was published by the Museum of Contemporary Art, Chicago in 2001.

== Collections and awards ==
Bronson's solo work is in the collections of the National Gallery of Canada (Ottawa), The Whitney Museum (New York), the Jewish Museum (New York), the Agnes Etherington Art Centre (Kingston), and private collections.

Bronson has been awarded the Skowhegan Award (2006), the Governor General's Award in Visual and Media Arts (2002), the Bell Award in Video Art (2001), and a Chalmers Fellowship (2003). Other awards include The Gershon Iskowitz Prize (1988), The Lifetime Achievement Award from the City of Toronto (1993), the Banff Centre for Arts and Creativity National Award (1993), and the Jean A. Chalmers Award for Visual Arts (1994). He is a member of the Royal Canadian Academy of Arts.

He has received honorary doctorates from NSCAD University, Halifax, Canada; Concordia University, Montreal, Canada; and McMaster University, Hamilton, Canada. In 2008, he was made an Officer of the Order of Canada. In 2011, he was named a Chevalier de l'ordre des arts et lettres (Knight of the Order of Arts and Letters) by Frédéric Mitterrand, Minister of Culture and Communications for France, at a ceremony held at the Residence of the Canadian ambassador to France in Paris. In 2014, The Temptation of AA Bronson won the AICA Netherlands award for best exhibition.

In 2012, he received the Queen Elizabeth II's Diamond Jubilee Medal.
