= 1994 in Canada =

- Decades: 1970s; 1980s; 1990s; 2000s; 2010s
- See also: History of Canada; Timeline of Canadian history; List of years in Canada

Events from the year 1994 in Canada.

== Incumbents ==
=== Crown ===
- Monarch – Elizabeth II

=== Federal government ===
- Governor General – Ray Hnatyshyn
- Prime Minister – Jean Chrétien
- Chief Justice – Antonio Lamer (Quebec)
- Parliament – 35th (from January 14)

=== Provincial governments ===
==== Lieutenant governors ====
- Lieutenant Governor of Alberta – Gordon Towers
- Lieutenant Governor of British Columbia – David Lam
- Lieutenant Governor of Manitoba – Yvon Dumont
- Lieutenant Governor of New Brunswick – Gilbert Finn (until June 21) then Margaret McCain
- Lieutenant Governor of Newfoundland – Frederick Russell
- Lieutenant Governor of Nova Scotia – Lloyd Crouse (until June 23) then James Kinley
- Lieutenant Governor of Ontario – Hal Jackman
- Lieutenant Governor of Prince Edward Island – Marion Reid
- Lieutenant Governor of Quebec – Martial Asselin
- Lieutenant Governor of Saskatchewan – Sylvia Fedoruk (until May 31) then Jack Wiebe

==== Premiers ====
- Premier of Alberta – Ralph Klein
- Premier of British Columbia – Mike Harcourt
- Premier of Manitoba – Gary Filmon
- Premier of New Brunswick – Frank McKenna
- Premier of Newfoundland – Clyde Wells
- Premier of Nova Scotia – John Savage
- Premier of Ontario – Bob Rae
- Premier of Prince Edward Island – Catherine Callbeck
- Premier of Quebec – Robert Bourassa (until January 11) then Daniel Johnson, Jr. (January 11 to September 26) then Jacques Parizeau
- Premier of Saskatchewan – Roy Romanow

=== Territorial governments ===
==== Commissioners ====
- Commissioner of Yukon – John Kenneth McKinnon
- Commissioner of Northwest Territories – Daniel L. Norris

==== Premiers ====
- Premier of the Northwest Territories – Nellie Cournoyea
- Premier of Yukon – John Ostashek

== Events ==
=== January to June ===
- Winter – One of the coldest winters on record affects much of Canada.
- January 1 – North American Free Trade Agreement (NAFTA) goes into effect.
- January 11 – Daniel Johnson, Jr., becomes premier of Quebec, replacing Robert Bourassa.
- February – The first Liberal budget slashes spending in an effort to cut the deficit. Unemployment Insurance and provincial transfer payments are especially hard hit.
- March 21 – A civilian inquiry in the behaviour of the Canadian Airborne in Somalia is launched.
- April 1 – The community of Arctic Red River, Northwest Territories, is renamed to Tsiigehtchic.
- April 5 – The Just Desserts shooting occurs in Toronto,
- May 10 – Annular solar eclipse happened in Ontario, Quebec and the Maritimes.
- June – An Ontario farmer is allowed to grow 10 acres (40,000 m^{2}) of marijuana for research purposes.
- June 9 – Ontario's Equality Rights Statute Amendment Act (Bill 167), a bill proposed by the government of Bob Rae to extend civil union rights to same-sex couples, is defeated on a vote of 68–59 in the Legislative Assembly of Ontario.

=== July to December ===
- August 14 - Grant Bristow is exposed by Toronto Sun being a CSIS asset and exposing much of his Heritage Front white supremacist group activity.
- September 12 – Quebec election, the Parti Québécois defeats the Parti libéral du Québec, which had been in power for nine years.
- September 26 – Jacques Parizeau (Parti Québécois) is sworn in as premier of Quebec, replacing Daniel Johnson, Jr.
- October 5 and October 6 – Members of the Solar Temple cult commit mass suicide.
- December – Lucien Bouchard is infected with necrotizing fasciitis and loses a leg.

=== Full date unknown ===
- Conrad Black's company buys the Chicago Sun-Times.
- Bertram Brockhouse shares the Nobel Prize in Physics.
- Cigarette taxes are slashed to battle smuggling and black market organizations.
- Canadian troops leave CFB Lahr, ending the Canadian armed forces presence in Europe.
- The Alberta Court of Appeal strikes down a lower court ruling that homosexual persons are to be covered under the province's human rights legislation. The case, originally brought by Delwin Vriend, was subsequently appealed to the Supreme Court of Canada.
- American hardware retail chain, Home Depot buys the Aikenhead's Hardware chain.

== Arts and literature ==
=== New works ===
- Margaret Atwood: Good Bones and Simple Murders
- Robert J. Sawyer: Foreigner
- William Bell: Five Days of the Ghost
- Michael Ignatieff: Blood and Belonging: Journeys into the New Nationalism
- Réjean Ducharme: Va savoir
- Mordecai Richler: This Year in Jerusalem
- Dave Duncan: The Living God
- Hank Snow: Just a Hank Snow Story
- Alice Munro: Open Secrets
- Douglas Coupland: Life After God
- Farley Mowat: Born Naked

==== Awards ====
- Giller Prize: M.G. Vassanji: The Book of Secrets
- Books in Canada First Novel Award: Deborah Joy Corey, Losing Eddie: A Novel
- Geoffrey Bilson Award: Kit Pearson, The Lights Go On Again
- Gerald Lampert Award: Barbara Klar, The Night You Called Me a Shadow and Illya Tourtidis, Mad Magellan's Tale
- Marian Engel Award: Jane Urquhart
- Pat Lowther Award: Diana Brebner, The Golden Lotus
- Stephen Leacock Award: Bill Richardson, Bachelor Brother's Bed and Breakfast
- Trillium Book Award English: Donald Haram Akenson, Conor: A Biography of Conor Cruise O'Brien; Volume 1 Narrative,
- Trillium Book Award French: Andrée Lacelle, Tant de vie s'égare
- Vicky Metcalf Award: Welwyn Wilton Katz

=== Television ===
- The Kids in the Hall ends

=== Films ===
- Atom Egoyan's Exotica is released

== Sport ==
- February 14 – The Vancouver Grizzlies are established as the NBA's second Canadian team. They started play in 1995.
- February 27 – The 1994 Winter Olympics end in Lillehammer, Norway.
- May 14 – The Kamloops Blazers win their second Memorial Cup by defeating the Laval Titan 5 to 3. The entire tournament took place at Colisée de Laval in Laval, Quebec
- June 14 – New York Rangers win their fourth (and first since 1940) Stanley Cup by defeating the Vancouver Canucks 4 games to 3.
- July 6 – 3 more American teams (Las Vegas Posse, the Shreveport Pirates and the Baltimore Stallions) are established in the Canadian Football League.
- August 18–28 – 1994 Commonwealth Games in Victoria, British Columbia.
- October – A lockout closes the National Hockey League for the entire first half of the season.
- November 19 – The Western Ontario Mustangs win their sixth Vanier Cup by defeating the Saskatchewan Huskies 50–40 in the 30th Vanier Cup played at Skydome in Toronto.
- November 27 – The BC Lions win their third Grey Cup by defeating the Baltimore Stallions 26 to 23 in the 82nd Grey Cup played at BC Place Stadium in Vancouver. Vancouver's own Lui Passaglia is awarded the game's Most Valuable Canadian.
- Ice hockey is made Canada's official winter sport. Lacrosse is named official summer sport.

== Births ==
- February 8 – Nikki Yanofsky, singer and songwriter
- February 16 – Matthew Knight, actor
- February 19 – Jean-Carl Boucher, actor and filmmaker
- February 25 – Eugenie Bouchard, tennis player
- March 1 – Justin Bieber, singer
- March 5 – Aislinn Paul, actress
- March 13 – Andrea Macasaet, actress and singer
- March 25 – Keffals, transgender activist
- April 17 – Alanna Goldie, fencer
- April 19 – Maddison Bird, pair skater
- May 1 – Antoine Bibeau, ice hockey player
- May 4 – Kurtis Conner, comedian and podcaster
- May 11 – David Alvarez, actor and dancer
- June 2 – Shroud, YouTuber
- July 17 – Jessica Amlee, actress
- July 18 – Taylor Russell, actress and filmmaker
- July 27 – Winnie Harlow, fashion model
- August 25 – Paul-André Brasseur, actor
- September 8 – Élie Dupuis, actor
- October 2 – Brendan Meyer, actor
- October 9 – Jodelle Ferland, actress
- November 10 – Luke Bilyk, actor
- November 11 – Connor Price, actor and rapper
- December 28 – Avery Konrad, actress

=== Full date unknown ===
- Sean Collins, son of politician Chris Collins (died 2007)

== Deaths ==
- February 12 – Sue Rodriguez, advocate for assisted suicide (born 1950)
- March 4 – John Candy, comedian and actor (born 1950)
- April 17 – Robert Legget, civil engineer, historian and non-fiction writer (born 1904)
- June 17 – Helen Battle, first Canadian woman PhD in marine biology (born 1903)
- July 1 – Michael Cook, playwright (born 1933)
- August – Wally Downer, politician (born 1904)
- October 12 – Gérald Godin, poet and politician (born 1938)
- December 10 – Alex Wilson, track and field athlete and Olympic silver medalist (born 1905)
- December 20 – John Wintermeyer, politician (born 1916)

=== Full date unknown ===
- Arthur Julian Andrew, diplomat and author (born 1915)
- Felix Partz, artist and co-founder of the artistic collective General Idea (born 1945)
- Jorge Zontal, artist and co-founder of the artistic collective General Idea (born 1944)
- Gordon Sparling, filmmaker (born 1900)

== See also ==
- 1994 in Canadian television
- List of Canadian films of 1994
