= Granada Venne =

Canadian artist and wardrobe assistant

- Born: Sharon Louella Venne; 26 July 1944
- Died: 26 December 2010 (aged 66); Toronto, Ontario, Canada

Granada Venne (26 July 1944 – 26 December 2010), born Sharon Louella Venne and also known as Granada Gazelle, was an artist who collaborated with General Idea throughout the 1970s. Venne also worked as a wardrobe assistant in the costume department for various film and TV productions, including David Cronenberg's The Brood, Fraggle Rock and Blue's Clues.

== Life & Career ==
Venne became associated with General Idea when she was neighbours with AA Bronson, Felix Partz and Jorge Zontal at their first house/"headquarters" on 78 Gerrard Street West in Toronto. Later, Venne moved in with the members of General Idea at their loft on 87 Yonge St. In the early 1970s, the membership of the General Idea collective was amorphous and included such individuals as Venne, the trans-singer Pascal (Stuart Murray), Noah Dakota (Noah James), O Burst (Paul Oberst) etc. One of Venne's earliest appearances in a General Idea project was starring in the group's unfinished 16mm film God Is My Gigolo, shot in 1969.

Venne is best known as a collaborator on the series of the Miss General Idea Pageants. Venne was crowned the winner of "Miss General Idea 1969," even though such an event never took place. At the "Miss General Idea 1970" pageant, that took place during the Festival of Underground Theatre at the St. Lawrence Centre for the Arts, Venne helped crown Honey Novick a.k.a. Miss Honey as the winner. For the 1971 Miss General Idea Pageant, that took place at the Art Gallery of Ontario and later awarded to Image Bank's Michael Morris, entry kits were sent out through mail-art networks with a letter of invitation from Venne. Venne was the "cover girl" of the September 1973 issue (Issue 2, No. 3, IFEL Paris Issue) of General Idea's FILE Megazine, a magazine publication which she often contributed to.

Venne also made appearances in other General Idea projects such as Art's Birthday and the Hollywood Decca Dance (17 January 1974), Blocking (1974), shot at Western Front Society in Vancouver, BC, and Going Thru The Motions (1975). She also collaborated with Michael Morris and Vincent Trasov of Image Bank on a series of ten photographs shot at "Babyland" in Roberts Creek, British Columbia entitled The Romance Of Mr. Peanut And Granada Gazelle (1974). Her practice also included mail and correspondence art in this period including contributions to Glenn Lewis' French Kisses project (1973), Trasov's Underwear series (1971) and Image Bank's Postcard Show (1971).

Granada was also a part of the all-female fashion show Glamazon with performance artist Dawn Eagle and photographer Isobel Henry that took place at St. Paul's Centre in December 1975.

Venne was an artist-in-residence at Western Front in Vancouver in 1977, invited by the artist and her friend Kate Craig. During her residency, Venne directed a single channel video work entitled Oscar Goldman and the Bi-Yonis (1977) that featured a noir-style narrative and starred artist Hank Bull as the protagonist.

Into the 1980s, Venne worked in the costume department of numerous films and television productions including as a wardrobe assistant or "mistress" for The Brood, Humongous (1982) as well as on Fraggle Rock and Blue's Clues.
