= David Buchan (artist) =

Canadian artist (1950-1993)

- Born: David William Buchan; February 11, 1950; Grimsby, Ontario, Canada
- Died: January 5, 1993 (aged 42); Toronto, Ontario, Canada
- Education: B.A. Honours, York University, Toronto (1988–1972)
- Awards: Canada Council Artist Studio in Paris (1982)

David William Buchan (11 February 1950 – 5 January 1994) was a Canadian artist who was part of the alternative art scene. He was also a graphic designer.

== Life ==
Buchan was born in 1950 in Grimsby, Ontario, Canada. He graduated with a B.A. Honours from York University in Toronto in 1972. Buchan lived in Montreal, Quebec, from 1972 to 1975 where he became fascinated with vintage clothes, particularly suits, which he began to collect. He returned to Toronto in 1975, quickly became involved with General Idea and from 1975 to 1985, he managed the art bookstore of Art Metropole which the group created. He also added to its archives and collection. His collection of fashion developed into Modern Fashions, a series of black-and-white photographs, which he exhibited in many venues from 1976 on, and which mutated into different series, and eventually, into his slide shows and performance pieces. Buchan died in Toronto in 1993 of HIV/AIDS-related causes. The artist's archives are held by the Library & Archives of the National Gallery of Canada as part of the Art Metropole Collection.

== Work ==
During the 1970s and 1980s, Buchan's work combined fashion, performance, and multimedia art with a camp (style) sensibility. A 1978 performance piece, Fruit Cocktails, featured the persona "Lamonte del Monte" which Buchan would continue to use into the future. The name of the performance and the persona itself referenced a popular brand of canned fruit and the company that produced it: Del Monte Foods. Buchan also created photo-text pieces that parodied old advertising and commented on popular culture.

In the mid-1980s, Buchan started making cibachrome transparencies and prints, and duro-transparencies, often large ones. These also frequently referenced advertising and historical artwork.

== Solo exhibitions ==
- 1979, "Modern Fashions," Glenbow Museum of Art, Calgary, Alberta
- 1980, "Modern Fashions," Art Gallery, Mount Saint Vincent University, Halifax, N.S.
- 1980, "Modern Fashions," Canadian Cultural Centre, Paris, France
- 1980, Art Gallery, Student Union Building, Edmonton, Alberta
- 1981, Gallery 76, Toronto, Ontario
- 1981, "Modern Fashions," I.D.A. Gallery, York University, Toronto, Ontario
- 1981, "Modern Fashions," Southern Alberta Art Gallery, Lethbridge, Alberta
- 1981, "Modern Fashions," Mercer Union, Toronto, Ontario
- 1981, "Roots, Lamonte Del Monte's Family Tree," YYZ, Toronto, Ontario
- 1984, A Space, Toronto, Ontario
- 1987, Cold City Gallery, Toronto, Ontario
- 1988, "David Buchan"; Canadian Youth, Western Front Society, Vancouver, B.C.
- 1988, "On the Rocks," Cold City Gallery, Toronto, Ontario
- 1989, Galerie SAW, Ottawa, Ontario
- 1993, "David Buchan: Inside the Image," The Power Plant, Toronto
- 1994, "Quotation: Re-presenting History," Winnipeg Art Gallery, Winnipeg
- 1996, "David Buchan: Man-About-Town," Grimsby Public Art Gallery, Grimsby
- 2012, "An Introduction to the Language of Partial Seduction: Works by David Buchan," Art Museum at the University of Toronto, Toronto, Ontario

== Group exhibitions and performances ==
Buchan participated in many group international exhibitions in Stuttgart, West Germany (1983); London, England (1991); and New York (1991). His performances, though mostly in Canada, also took place in Vienna; Brussels; Frankfurt; and Basel.

== Collections ==
His work is in the collections of the National Gallery of Canada, the Canadian Museum of Contemporary Photography, the Art Museum at the University of Toronto, the University of Lethbridge Art Gallery, the Canada Council Art Bank, and the Winnipeg Art Gallery.

== Bibliography ==
- Maher, Sabrina (2014). An introduction to the language of partial seduction : works by David Buchan. Toronto: Justina M. Barnicke Gallery, U of T.
