= Chrysanne Stathacos =

Canadian-American artist

- Born: 1951 (age 74–75); Buffalo, New York
- Known for: Multidisciplinary artist
- Notable work: The Wish Machine
- Website: www.chrysannestathacos.com

Chrysanne Stathacos (born 1951) is a Canadian American multidisciplinary artist. Her work has encompassed print, textile, performance and conceptual art. Stathacos is heavily involved with and influenced by feminism, Greek Mythology, eastern spirituality and Tibetan Buddhism, all of which inform her current artistic practice.

== Career ==
Chrysanne Stathacos was born in 1951 in Buffalo, New York, her family is of Greek, American and Canadian origin.

Stathacos' early work incorporated the use of fictional identities into a print and textile practice. She invented the persona of Anne de Cybelle as a means of interrogating and subverting the history of the traditional Western canon of art history. This practice, and the work that resulted from it, led to a performative collaboration with Hunter Reynolds, The Banquet, (a loose reinterpretation and restaging of Meret Oppenheim's Spring Feast).

The loss of friends due to AIDS in the mid-to-late 1990s prompted Stathacos to travel to India and East Asia, where she became involved with Buddhism and Eastern spirituality, which in turn informed both her art and activism. Before his death from complications of AIDS in 1994, the artist Jorge Zontal - a member of the collective General Idea - gave Stathacos cannabis plants from his apartment garden. She later incorporated them into a series of paintings, which were not exhibited until 2018.

Inspired by a wishing tree seen on a visit to New Delhi, Stathacos created the Wish Machine, an interactive installation where passers-by could buy a scent from a vending-machine-style installation which would in turn aid them in manifesting a desire. Commissioned by Creative Time as part of their Day With(out) Art initiative in 1997, this was installed in Manhattan's Grand Central Station. It later toured internationally.

Stathacos has worked extensively with an aura camera, photographing holy people in India from 1999 until 2003.

Most recently, Stathacos' artwork has evolved into an ongoing time-based site-specific installation practice, where she creates elaborate mandalas made from plucked rose petals and circular mirrors. The creation of the mandala is in and of itself a performance. The rose petals dry over the course of their display, and are subsequently swept away by Stathacos. She has created these mandalas for numerous exhibitions internationally, and was commissioned to create one to honour the visit of the Dalai Lama to the University of Buffalo in 2006.

In addition to her ongoing career as an artist, Stathacos is the cofounder and a director of Dongyu Gatsal Ling Initiatives, working with DGLI'S Spiritual Advisor Jetsunma Tenzin Palmo, of the Dongyu Gatsal Ling Nunnery in India. The Initiative aims to reclaim lost traditions of Tibetan Buddhist women.

Stathacos' work in the print medium has included a number of artist books, including 1000 Wishes: The Wish Machine, which is in the library collections of MoMA and the Art Gallery of Ontario. She is a co-editor of the art blog MOMMY, an interview-based e-zine focusing on the work of women artists.

== Honors and awards ==
Stathacos has received grants and fellowships for her work from the Adolph and Esther Gottlieb Foundation (1998), Canada Council for the Arts, Art Matters Foundation (1995), the Japan Foundation (2001), the Puffin Foundation (2015), and others.

== Collections ==
Stathacos' work is included in several public collections including public collections including the National Gallery of Canada; Albright-Knox Art Gallery museum in Buffalo, New York; the Art Gallery of Greater Victoria in British Columbia, Canada; the Castellani Art Museum, in Lewiston, New York; the Art Gallery of Ontario, in Toronto, Canada; and the Memorial Art Gallery of the University of Rochester, among other public and private collections.
