= Anne Pasternak =

American museum curator (born 1964)

- Born: 1964 (age 61–62); New York City
- Education: University of Massachusetts, Amherst, Hunter College
- Occupations: Museum director, curator, art critic
- Organization(s): Brooklyn Museum, Creative Time, Real Art Ways
- Known for: Director of the Brooklyn Museum

Anne Pasternak (born 1964) is a curator and museum director. She is the current Shelby White and Leon Levy Director of the Brooklyn Museum.

== Education ==
Pasternak was born in Baltimore and received her undergraduate degree in Art History and Business Management from the University of Massachusetts, Amherst. She went on to take graduate courses at Hunter College but left without taking a degree.

Pasternak has been awarded honorary doctorates from Pratt Institute and Hunter College

== Career ==
Pasternak's career began with an internship turned directorship at the Stux Gallery in Boston in the 1980s. She then served as Curator at Real Art Ways, an arts nonprofit in Hartford, Connecticut. She curated public art projects with such now acclaimed artists as Mel Chin and Mark Dion as well as the groundbreaking exhibition "Hip Hop Nation".

=== Creative Time ===
In 1993 Anne Pasternak left Real Art Ways and became the executive director of Creative Time. There she curated and organized numerous exhibitions, events, discussions, and public art projects including the annual "Tribute In Light" memorial honoring the lives lost on September 11, 2001; Paul Chan's Waiting for Godot in Post-Katrina New Orleans, and Kara Walker's A Subtlety in Brooklyn's Domino Sugar Factory in the Williamsburg neighborhood.

=== Brooklyn Museum ===
In 2015, Pasternak left Creative Time and replaced Arnold L. Lehman as the director of the Brooklyn Museum. Pasternak's directorship at the Brooklyn Museum marks the second time a woman has kept a directing role in an encyclopedic New York museum. Isabel Spaulding Roberts was the first female director of the Brooklyn Museum. As a former director of a public art organization, this new position represents a shift in her career from a broader public sphere into the architecture of a museum.

Her portrait is included in the series of Female Museum Art Director by artist Amy Chaiklin.

== Awards and recognition ==
- Ufficiale dell’Ordine della Stella d’Italia, 2018
- Crains 50 Most Powerful Women in New York, 2019

== Controversies ==
In October 2019, the museum has deaccessioned a Francis Bacon painting through a Sotheby's auction. During his lifetime, Bacon wrote of the artwork that, “It was a throw-out and it depresses me […] that it has years later found its way onto the art market and I would prefer if it were not exhibited.” At this time, the museum was still running on a multi-million dollar deficit.

In May of 2020 66 current and former Brooklyn Museum employees wrote an open letter to the administration which was titled "Unbought and Unbossed". Referencing Shirley Chisholm, the letter aimed to address great inequities within the institution. "We have mobilized current and former Brooklyn Museum employees, because we are tired of museum leadership violating and disregarding our Black, Indigenous, and People of Color (BIPOC) staff and community, while claiming that our institutional vision is to be “where great art and courageous conversations are catalysts for a more connected, civic, and empathetic world.” We have experienced and/or witnessed, and for some have been made aware of, acts of racism, from tokenism to gaslighting, toward Black people in this institution, and we can no longer be silent." The letter also provided solutions including the hiring of a DEIA director, and annual reports to provide more transparency.

On June 12, 2024, Pasternak's residence was vandalized with red paint and a banner with text of her name, "Brooklyn Museum", "White-Supremacist Zionist", and "Funds Genocide". This was part of a coordinated action that targeted three other officials of the museum, which has faced controversy both before, and after October 7, over its funding and alleged financial ties to Israel, its hosting of the "This Place" photography exhibition, as well as police crackdown of one such protest, characterized as "violent". New York City Mayor Eric Adams, called the event "overt, unacceptable antisemitism.” The New York City Police Department released surveillance footage depicting five suspects and asking the public for help identifying them. They have not determined whether the five individuals were also behind the other acts of vandalism. Some elected officials alleged antisemitic motive for the vandalism without substantiation, including Senator Chuck Schumer, Councilmember Lincoln Restler, and Comptroller Brad Lander, who erroneously stated that the board members targeted were Jewish.

By early August 6, 2024, two people had been arrested and charged with a hate crime for their alleged involvement in the vandalism.

In February 2025, Pasternak announced the museum would layoff up to 40 staff members due to a $10 million deficit. Pasternak announced that senior leadership who all make upwards of $200,000 would take a 10-20% cut in their salaries. Pasternak's own salary is last cited as $1.2 million in 2023; a majority of those who were laid off made under $80,000.
