= Peggy Gale =

Canadian curator (born 1944)

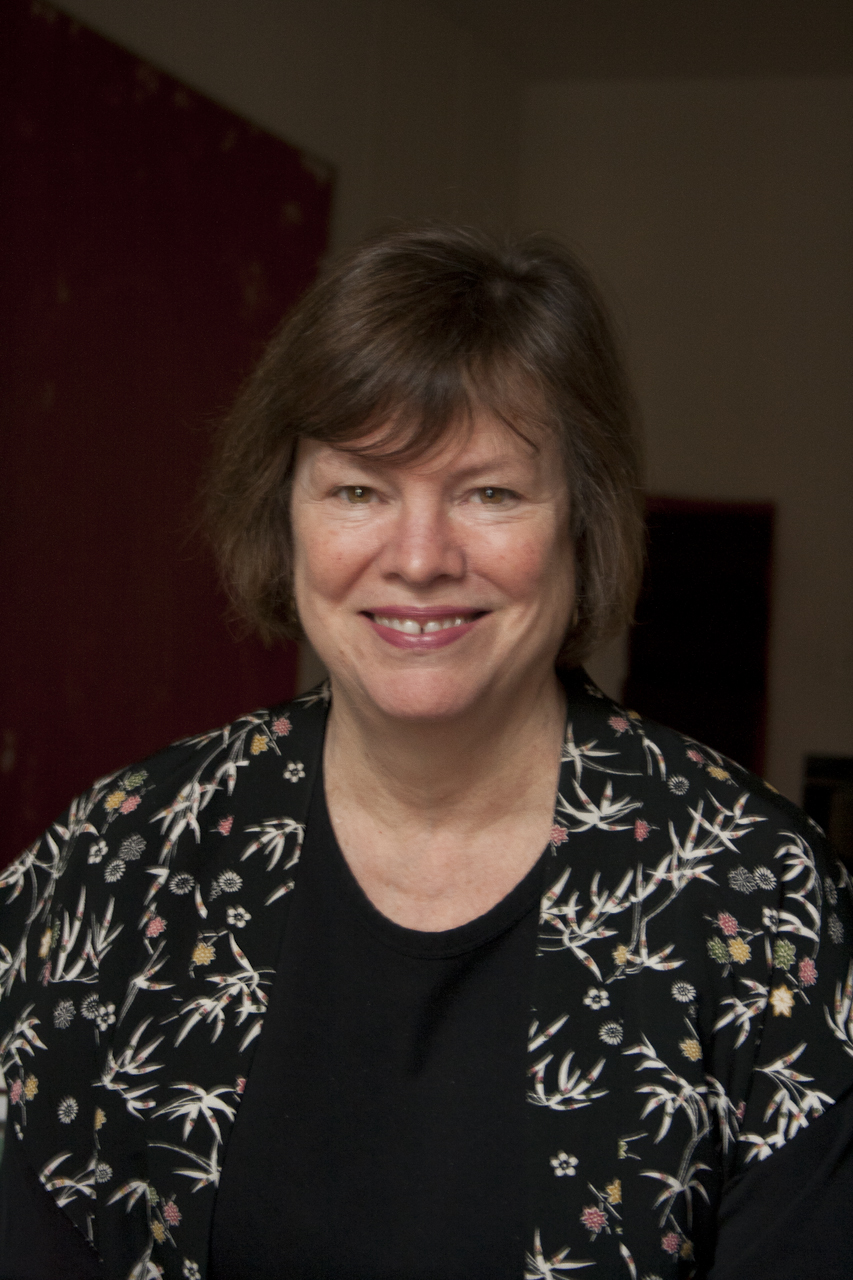
- Born: Mackenzie, Guyana
- Education: University of Toronto, Università degli Studi, Florence Italy
- Known for: Curator, Writer, Editor
- Awards: Governor General's Award in Visual and Media Arts (2006)

Peggy Gale (born 1944) is an independent Canadian curator, writer, and editor. Gale studied Art History and received her Honours Bachelor of Arts degree in Art History from the University of Toronto in 1967. Gale has published extensively on time-based works by contemporary artists in numerous magazines and exhibition catalogues. She was editor of Artists Talk 1969-1977, from The Press of the Nova Scotia College of Art and Design, Halifax (2004) and in 2006, she was awarded the Governor General's Award in Visual and Media Arts. Gale was the co-curator for Archival Dialogues: Reading the Black Star Collection in 2012 and later for the Biennale de Montréal 2014, L’avenir (looking forward), at the Musée d’art contemporain de Montréal. Gale is a member of IKT (International Association of Curators of Contemporary Art), AICA (International Association of Art Critics), The Writers' Union of Canada, and has been a contributing editor of Canadian Art since 1986.

== Early career ==
From 1967–74 Gale was the Education Officer at the Art Gallery of Ontario. While at the AGO, Gale organized the exhibition, Videoscape (1974), the first museum exhibition to recognize video as an artistic practice. In 1974-75, Gale was the Assistant Film and Video officer at the Canada Council for the Arts (Ottawa), then returned to Toronto as Video and Film Director at Art Metropole 1975-79. She was the Executive Director of one of the oldest artist run centres in Canada, A Space, from 1979-81. In 1981 Gale resigned her position at A Space, and as an independent, she was curator for performance art in OKanada at Akademie der Künste in Berlin (1982–83).

== Later career ==
Since 1981, Gale has continued to be a full-time independent critic and has curated exhibitions at Art Metropole (Museums by Artists, 1983), National Gallery of Canada (Electronic Landscapes, 1989), Canadian Embassy, Tokyo (Northern Lights, 1991), Tout le temps/ Every Time for La Biennale de Montréal 2000, the Museum of Contemporary Canadian Art (Donigan Cumming: Moving Pictures, 2005), and many others. In 1994, Gale and Lisa Steele co edited Video re/View: The (best) Source for Critical Writings on Canadian Artists’ Video, a joint project between Vtape and Art Metropole. Her collected essays investigating the narrative basis of artists' video, Videotexts, was published by Wilfrid Laurier University Press in 1995. Beginning in 2005, Gale was the lead researcher and writer for Video Art in Canada, a website that was part of the Virtual Museum of Canada. It is now available through Vtape at www.videoartincanada.ca. Gale also co-curated Live With Culture in 2006 with Fern Bayer and Chrysanne Stathacos for the city of Toronto's inaugural Nuit Blanche in Zone A: Bloor/Yorkville area. She was a part of Think:Film - International Experimental Cinema Congress 2012, an international symposium at the Akademie der Künste, Berlin. In October 2014- January 2015, Gale co-curated and conceptualized the Biennale de Montréal 2014, L'avenir (looking forward) with Gregory Burke at the Musée d'art contemporain de Montréal in collaboration with Lesley Johnstone and Mark Lanctôt. Gale continues to be active as a curator, writer, consultant, and mentor and her papers have been accepted into the archives at the Art Gallery of Ontario.

== Awards ==
- Winner of the 2006 Governor General’s Award for Visual and Media Arts
- Toronto Arts Award (Visual Arts) 2000
- Canada Council and Japan/Canada Fund: exhibition assistance, Northern Lights exhibition (Tokyo) and tour, 1991
- Canada Council Outreach Program - Circulation and Dissemination Development Assistance 1998 (travel to Igloolik, Nunavut)
- Canada Council Arts Grant "A" (curator/critic) 1983
- Canada Council Travel Grant 2015, 2012, 1989, 1978, 1976
- Canada Council Short Term Grant (critical writing) 1981
- Ontario Arts Council (critical writing) 1992, 1990, 1987
- Ontario Arts Council (Writers' Reserve) 1989

== Work ==
=== Selected books edited ===
- PUBLIC: Art/Culture/Ideas 44, Experimental Media, 2011.
- Artists Talk: 1969-1977. Halifax: The Press of the Nova Scotia College of Art and Design, 2004
- Before and After the I-Bomb: An Artist in the Information Environment. by Tom Sherman. Banff: The Banff Centre Press, 2002
- Video re/View: The (best) Source for Critical Writings on Canadian Artists' Video (with Lisa Steele). Toronto: Art Metropole/VTape, 1996
- From Sea to Shining Sea: artist-initiated activity in Canada, 1939-1987, ed. AA Bronson. Associate editors: René Blouin, Peggy Gale, Glenn Lewis.Toronto: The Power Plant, 1987
- Museums by Artists (with A.A. Bronson) Toronto: Art Metropole, 1983
- Performance by Artists (with A.A. Bronson) Toronto: Art Metropole, 1979
- Video by Artists. Toronto: Art Metropole, 1976

=== Selected exhibition catalogues ===
- 'Wide Eyes', (curator’s introduction) in L’avenir (looking forward). Montreal: La Biennale de Montréal 2014 and Musée d’art contemporain de Montréal.
- 'Mapping Intuition,' In Archival Dialogues: Reading the Black Star Collection, ed. Peggy Gale. Toronto: Ryerson Image Centre editions, 2012.
- 'Living History,' In Art Metropole: The Top 100, Ottawa: National Gallery of Canada, 2006.
- 'Both Memory and Territory,' In Real Fictions: Four Canadian Artists. Sydney (Australia): Museum of Contemporary Art, 1996
- 'Northern Lights: An Exhibition of Canadian Video Art.' Tokyo: Canadian Embassy and International Videoworks, 1991
- 'Norman Cohn: Portraits.' Toronto: Art Gallery of Ontario, 1984
- 'A New Medium,' In Videoscape. Toronto: Art Gallery of Ontario, 1974

=== Selected book chapters and contributions ===
- 'Stan Douglas: Evening and Others.' In Parachute: The Anthology (1975-2000), Vol. III : Photography, Film, Video, and New Media, ed. Chantal Pontbriand, Zurich & Dijon: JRP | Ringier & Les presses du réel, 2015
- 'All These Years: Early Toronto Video.' In Explosion in the Movie Machine: Essays and Documents on Toronto Artists’ Film and Video, ed. Chris Gehman, Toronto: Images Festival and Liaison of Independent Filmmakers of Toronto, 2013
- 'Eric Cameron: Author! Author!' In Cover and Uncover: Eric Cameron, ed. Ann Davis. Calgary: University of Calgary Press, 2011.
- 'Looking for David Askevold,' In David Askevold: Once Upon a Time in the East, ed. David Diviney, Halifax: Art Gallery of Nova Scotia and Fredericton: Goose Lane Editions, 2011
- 'Video has captured our imagination.' In Video re/View: The (best) Source for Critical Writings on Canadian Artusts' Video, eds. Peggy Gale and Lisa Steele. Toronto: Art Metropole/VTape, 1996
- 'A History in Four Moments.' In Mirror Machine: Video and Identity. ed. Janine Marchessault. Toronto: YYZ Books and Montreal: Centre for Research on Canadian Cultural Industries and Institutions, 1995
- 'History Lesson.' In Performance and Multi-Disciplinarity: Post-Modernism ed. Chantal Pontbriand. Montreal: les éditions Parachute, 1981
