= Justine Ludwig =

Curator

- Education: Goldsmiths, University of London (MA); Colby College (BA)
- Occupations: Director, curator and writer
- Title: Executive Director of Creative Time

Justine Ludwig is a director, curator, and writer. She is the Creative Director of the Getty Center's PST ART program, and was previously the Executive Director of Creative Time, an arts non-profit based in New York.

== Education ==
Ludwig has an MA in Global Arts from Goldsmiths University of London and a BA in Art with a concentration in Art History from Colby College.

== Career ==
Ludwig was the Chief Curator and Deputy Director of Dallas Contemporary from 2015 to 2018. In Dallas, she exhibited artists such as Pia Camil, Paola Pivis, Bani Abidi and Nadia Kaabi-Linke, which earned mention in W Magazine.

In Dallas, Ludwig helped establish the city as an emerging art capital, describing Dallas as "a city in a state of becoming." She curated Future Worlds, the 2018 iteration of Aurora, a public art event that transformed downtown Dallas into an open-air hub for installation, light, and sound art. The exhibition featured artists dealing with climate change, automation, and political unrest.

Ludwig was assistant and adjunct curator at Contemporary Arts Center in Cincinnati. Ludwig also held posts at the Museum of Fine Arts Boston, the Rose Art Museum at Brandeis University, the Colby College Museum of Art, and the MIT List Visual Arts Center.

Previously, Ludwig was the Executive Director at Creative Time, and New York arts non-profit. She was responsible for organizing the Emerging Artist Open Call program, which invites emerging artists from New York City to work with Creative Time to realize their first exhibition. Its first iteration was The Privilege of Escape by Risa Puno. At the organization, she has focused on socially engaged artwork, such as Jenny Holzer's 2019 VIGIL, which projected gun violence testimonies onto the buildings of Rockefeller Center.

In 2025, she was named Creative Director of PST ART at the Getty.

Ludwig has curated projects with Shilpa Gupta, Kiki Smith, Pedro Reyes, Laercio Rendondo, Paola Pivi, Ambreen Butt, and Anila Quayyum Agha.

Her writing has been published in Whitehot Magazine, Patron Magazine, and affidavit.

Her research interests include the intersections of aesthetics, architecture, violence, economics, and globalization.

== Awards and recognition ==
In 2016, Artsy named Ludwig one of 'The 20 Most Influential Young Curators in the United States'. In 2019, Town & Country included Ludwig in its list of '102 people who will be invited everywhere this season'.
