= Creative Time =

Public arts organization

- Founded: 1973
- Headquarters: New York City, United States
- Revenue: 3,832,768 United States dollar (2016)
- Total assets: 3,995,835 United States dollar (2022)
- Website: creativetime.org

Creative Time is a nonprofit arts organization based in New York City, established in 1974. It is known for organizing and presenting public art projects in urban spaces.

== History ==
Creative Time was founded in 1974 to promote contemporary art.

Early Creative Time programs took over abandoned storefronts and neglected public spaces, such as the Brooklyn Bridge Anchorage and the Great Hall of the Chamber of Commerce in Lower Manhattan. Both landmarks had been unused for years before Creative Time used them through programs like Art in the Anchorage (1983–2001) and Projects at the Chamber (1982).

Creative Time organized Art on the Beach, a project which brought together artists to create large-scale public works in Battery Park City between 1978 and 1985. Each summer, for three months, Art on the Beach offered site-specific sculpture and performances that were open to the public and free of cost.

Creative Time was led by co-founder Anita Contini, who served as director until Cee Scott Brown took over in 1987. Anne Pasternak became director from 1993 to September 2015. Justine Ludwig then took over as executive director.

== Reception and notable projects ==
In collaboration with the Dallas art community, Creative Time took part in a yearlong study to better understand the strengths and areas of growth within the Dallas art scene. Following these meetings, Creative Time produced recommendations to bolster the art scene in Dallas, identifying 13 key elements, including outreach, educational opportunities, small and mid-sized gallery spaces, and patrons.

Creative Time's other projects range from art installations at the 2008 Art Basel in Miami to the opening of a gallery under the Brooklyn Bridge in 1983.

Projects in recent years include the Cosmologyscape, a public art project created by Kite and Alisha B. Wormsley and the Research and Development Fellowship, which supports New York City-based socially engaged artists. Creative Time has also collaborated with the artists Vito Acconci, Diller + Scofidio, David Byrne, Felix Gonzalez-Torres, Chrysanne Stathacos, Red Grooms, Jenny Holzer, Takashi Murakami, Shirin Neshat, Sonic Youth, Elizabeth Streb, Tania Bruguera, Temporary Services, Marc Horowitz and Superflex.

Creative Time also partners with other cultural institutions in New York City and elsewhere, such as the Dia Art Foundation, the Queens Museum of Art, Lincoln Center, and the Metropolitan Museum of Art.
