= Angela Bulloch =

Canadian-born artist

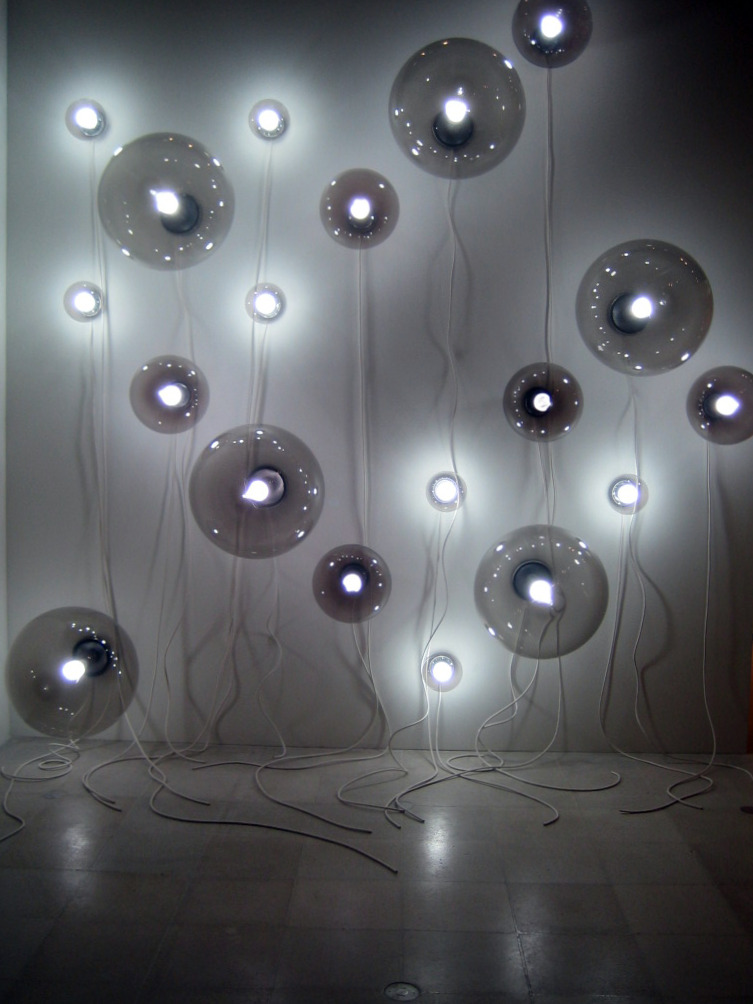
'Smoke spheres 2-4' by Bulloch in the Hayward Gallery, London

Angela Bulloch (born 1966 in Rainy River, Ontario, Canada), is a Canadian artist who often works with sound and installation; she is recognised as one of the Young British Artists. Bulloch lives and works in Berlin.

== Life and career ==
Bulloch studied at Goldsmiths' College, London (1985–1988). She was included in the Freeze Exhibition in 1988 and was established as one of the Young British Artists. On reflecting on being a Young British Artist, Bulloch said "When I was 22, it was important for me. It was helpful in terms of managing media responses to my work because whenever I mentioned this little label, everyone was like, "Oh yeah, YBA". But they were just talking about a media generated label, instead of the actual work. It's easier, isn't it? It's for lazy journalists." In 1989, she won the Whitechapel Artists' Award.

Bulloch undertook a two-month residency at ARCUS- project in Moriya, Japan in 1994. She was nominated for the Turner Prize in 1997, part of an all-female shortlist that also included Cornelia Parker, Christine Borland and Gillian Wearing (who won the prize that year). For the Turner Prize exhibition, Bulloch exhibited her playful artwork called Rules Series. In 2005, she was nominated for the Preis der Nationalgalerie für junge Kunst.

In 2002, Bulloch was awarded the ASEF (Asia-Europe Foundation) Cultural Grant. Between 2001 and 2003, she undertook a guest professorship of sculpture at the Akademie für Bildende Künste, Vienna.

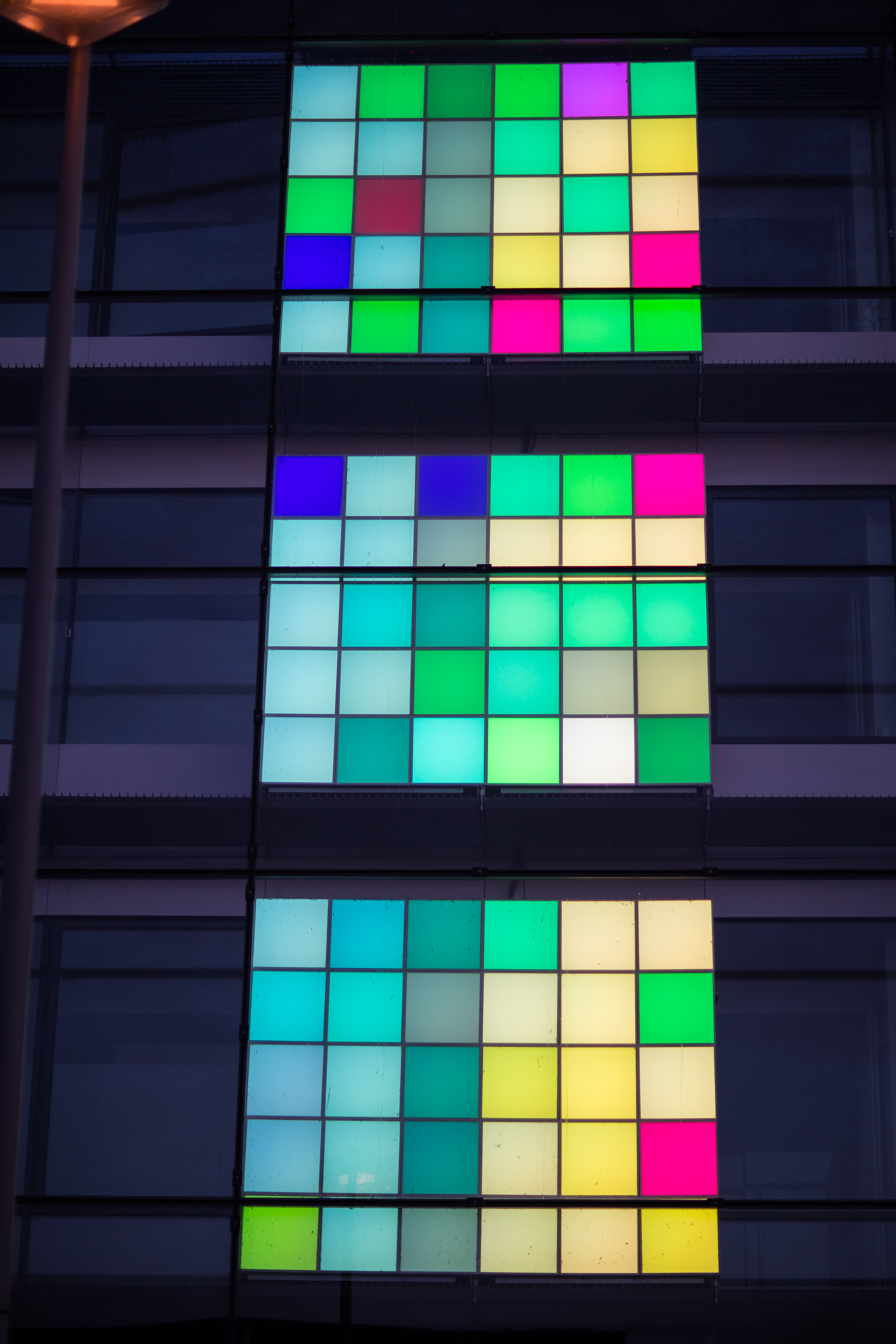
'Pacific Rim Around & Sideways Up' by Bulloch installed on the Nord/LB building, Friedrichswall, Hanover

Within her art, Bullock plays with the boundaries of mathematics and aesthetics. She has a particular interest in instructions and rules, especially in the context of technology. She is an ambiguous multi-disciplinary artist and has worked in multiple media, including video, installation, sculpture, painting. In particular, she has used video, animation, sound and light to explore pre-edited systems. Bulloch is recognised for her 'Pixel Boxes' originally constructed using beech wood and a plastic front screen and later with materials such as copper, aluminium or corian. The boxes use different lights and colours to create a variety of abstract patterns. Many of her works make use of biofeedback systems, such as in her 1994 work Betaville, a 'Drawing Machine' painting vertical and horizontal stripes on a wall, was triggered whenever someone sat on the bench in front of it. Bulloch has also made a number of works using Belisha beacons, which are more commonly used to illuminate pedestrian crossings. More recently, Bullock's Stacks are unique structures made of compiled rhomboids which play with light and colour to create optical effects. Bullock's art commonly relies on the interpretation of the viewer, with its meaning being determined by their subjectivity. A lot of her light and music works are developed using technology Bulloch has created herself.

Bulloch is a fan of music and performs live. She is also the owner of the record label LBCDLP. Music is often incorporated into her art in a variety of ways such as light installations that respond to a musical score.

Since 2018 Bulloch is a professor of Time-Based Media at HFBK Hamburg.

== Exhibitions ==
Bulloch exhibited at the Museum of Contemporary Art Chicago in 1997. Other museum exhibitions include Kunsthaus Glarus (2001); Berkeley Art Museum and Pacific Film Archive (2003); Le Consortium, Dijon (2005); Modern Art Oxford, Vienna Secession, and The Power Plant, Toronto (2005); and Lenbachhaus, Munich (2008). Her work was also included in notable group exhibitions such as The New Decor at Hayward Gallery, London; Colour Chart: Reinventing Colour 1950 to Today at Tate Liverpool and Museum of Modern Art, New York; and Theanyspacewhatever for which she created an installation for the ceiling of Frank Lloyd Wright's Solomon R. Guggenheim Museum in New York.

=== Selected solo exhibitions ===
- Angela Bulloch: "...then nothing turned itself inside-out and became something", Simon Lee Gallery, New York, USA (2019)
- Anima Vectorias, MAAT, Lisbon, Portugal (2019)
- Heavy Metal Stack of Six, Serralves Museum of Contemporary Art, Porto, Portugal (2019)
- Angela Bulloch, Omi International Arts Center, The Fields Sculpture Park, Ghent, New York (2017)
- Large Blue Music Listening Station, artgenève Salon d'Art, Geneva, Switzerland (2017)
- Euclid in Europe, Cristina Guerra Contemporary, Lisbon, Portugal (2017)
- Heavy Metal Body, Esther Schipper, Berlin, Germany (2017)
- Considering Dynamics & The Forms of Chaos, Sharjah Art Museum, Sharjah, United Arab Emirates (2016)
- Angela Bulloch: One Way Conversation, Simon Lee Gallery, Hong Kong (2016)
- Space Fiction Object, Galerie Eva Presenhuber, Zurich, Switzerland (2016)
- Angela Bulloch: New Wave Digits, Simon Lee Gallery, London, UK (2015)
- Topology: No Holes, Four Tails, Mary Boone Gallery, New York, USA (2015)
- Archetypes and Totem Antidotes, Galerie Micheline Szwajcer, Brussels, Belgium (2015)
- In Virtual Virto, Esther Schipper, Berlin, Germany (2014)
- Pentagon Principle, Galería Helga de Alvear, Madrid, Spain (2014)
- Universal Pixels and Music Listening Stations, Kerstin Engholm Galerie, Vienna, Austria (2014)
- Angela Bulloch: UNIVERSAL MINERAL, Simon Lee Gallery, Hong Kong (2013)
- Short Big Drama, Witte de With, Rotterdam, Netherlands (2012)
- ABCDLP 002- Short Big Dramaby George van Dam for Short Big Yellow Drawing Machine by Angela Bulloch, Esther Schipper, Berlin, Germany (2012)
- Time & Line, Städtische Galerie, Wolfsburg, Germany (2011)
- Information, Manifesto, Rules And Other Leaks..., Vattenfall Contemporary Art Prize, Berlinische Galerie, Berlin (2011)
- Angela Bulloch: Discrete Manifold Whatsoever, Simon Lee Gallery, London, UK (2010)
- Molecular Etwas von Angela Bulloch, Kunst Werke Berlin, Germany (2010)
- Redux, Esther Schipper, Berlin, Germany (2010)
- X Wohnungen Hilbrow, Johennesburg, South Africa (2010)
- Smoked, Formed & Quartered, Galeria Helga de Alvear, Madrid, Spain (2009)
- Angela Bulloch, Trajectories and Other Lines, Cristina Guerra Contemporary, Lisbon, Portugal (2009)
- Riley Optimism, Air de Paris, Paris, France (2009)
- Galerie Kreo, Paris, France (2009)
- The Space that Time Forgot, Städtische Galerie im Lenbachhaus, Munich, Germany (2008)
- Zhang Jiang Public Art Project, Shanghai, China (2008)
- V., Galeria Eva Presenhuber, Zürich, Switzerland (2008)
- X Wohnungen Neukölln (with Michael Iber), Gropiusstdadt Neukölln, Germany (2008)
- Repeat Refrain, Enel Contemporanea, Ara Pacis, Rome, Italy (2017)
- Are you coming or going, around?, Esther Schipper, Berlin, Germany (2017)
- Angela Bulloch, The Power Plant, Toronto, Canada (2006)
- De Pont Museum voor Hedendaagse Kunst, Tilburg, The Netherlands (2006)
- We Are Medi(eval) (with Liam Gillick), Cubitt Artists, London, England (2006)
- Yuko Gothic Grid, Galerie Micheline Szwajcer, Antwerp, Belgium (2006)
- Vehicles, Le Consortium, Dijon, France (2005)
- Angela Bulloch, Modern Art Oxford, Oxford, UK (2005)
- To the Power of 4., Secession, Vienna, Austria (2005)
- The Missing 13th, Galerĺa Helga de Alvear, Madrid Spain (2005)
- Antimatter, Galeria Eva Presenhuber, Zürich, Switzerland (2004)
- Engholm Engelhorn Galerie, Vienna, Austria (2004)
- Angela Bulloch/ Matrix 206. Macromatrix: For Your Pleasure, UC Berkeley Art Museum and Pacific Film Archive, Berkeley, California, USA (2003)
- New Work 8: Angela Bulloch, World Reflections, Aspen Art Museum, Aspen, Colorado, USA (2003)
- Disco Floor Bootleg: 4, Medienturm Graz, Graz, Austria (2003)
- Search and Arrest, Y8 International Sivananda Yoga Center, Hamburg, Germany (2002)
- Micro World, 1301 PE Brian D. Butler, Santa Monica, California, USA (2002)
- Macro World: One Hour^{3} and Canned, Schipper & Krome, Berlin, Germany (2002)
- Chain, Galerie Micheline Szwajcer, Antwerp, Belgium (2002)
- Angela Bulloch, Z-Point, Kunsthaus Glarus, Switzerland (2002)
- Institute of Visual Culture, Cambridge, England (2002)
- Matrix, Magnani, London, England (2001)
- Z Point, Kunsthaus Glarus, Switzerland (2001)
- Prototypes, Hauser & Wirth & Presenhuber, Zürich, Switzerland (2000)
- BLOW-UP T.V., Schipper & Krome, Berlin, Germany (2000)
- From the Eiffel Tower to Riesenrad, Gelerie Kerstin Engholm, Vienna, Austria (2000)
- Headless with Legs + Tripping, 1301 PE, Los Angeles, California (2000)
- Angela Bulloch & Sylvie Fleury, Medhi Chouakri, Berlin, Germany (1999)
- Codes, Schipper & Krome, Berlin, Germany (1998)
- Superstructure, Museum für Gegenwartkunst, Zürich, Switzerland (1998)
- Sounds Off, Robert Prime Gallery, London, England (1998)
- Vehicles, Le Consortium- Centre d'Art Contemporain, Dijon, France (1997)
- Soundbank, Kunstverein Ludwigsburg, Germany (1997)
- Galerie Walcheturm, Zürich, Switzerland (1996)
- Robert Prime Gallery, London, England (1996)
- Mudslinger, Schipper & Krome, Cologne, Germany (1995)
- From the Clink to Panorama Island, PADT, London, England (1995)
- Marc Foxx Gallery with 1301/ Brian Butler, Santa Monica, California, USA (1995)
- Kunstverein in Hamburg, Germany (1994)
- FRAC, Languedoc- Roussillon; Aldebaran, Baillargues, France (1994)
- Centre Pour la Crėation Contemporaine Tours, France (1993)
- Rules Series, Esther Schipper and Friesenwall 116a, Cologne, Germany (1993)
- 1301, Santica Monica, California (1993)
- The Art of Survival/ Baby Doll Saloon with Sylvie Fleury, Laurie Genillard, London, England (1993)
- Esther Schipper, Cologne, Germany (1992)
- Galleria Locus Solus, Genoa, Italy (1992)
- Le Case d'Arte, Milan, Italy (1991)
- Interim Art, London, England (1990)
- APAC Centre d'Art Contemporain, Nevers, France (1990)
- Galerie Claire Burrus, Paris, France (1990)
- Esther Schipper, Cologne, Germany (1990)

=== Selected group exhibitions ===
- Bulloch, Pryde: Sky, Rocks & Digits, Simon Lee Gallery, Hong Kong (2020–21)
- En Plein Air, Simon Lee Gallery, London, UK (2019)
- A Time Capsule, Works Made by Women for Parkett, 1984–2017, Parkett Exhibition Space, Zurich, Switzerland (2018)
- Double Lives. Visual Artists Making Music, mumok Museum Moderner Kunst Stiftung Ludwig Wien, Vienna, Austria (2018)
- Always Different. Always the Same, Bündner Kunstmuseum, Chur, Switzerland (2018)
- Metropolis, Simon Lee Gallery, New York, USA (2017)
- Mentally Yellow (High Noon), Kunstmuseum Bonn and Städtische Galerie im Lenbachhaus, Munich, Germany (2017)
- Ugo Rondinone: I <3 John Giorno, Howl!, New York, USA (2017)
- RULES, Migros Museum für Gegenwartskunst, Zurich, Switzerland (2017)
- Fractured: Kathryn Andrews, Angela Bulloch, Bernard Frize, Louise Lawler, Daido Moriyama, John Stezaker, Christopher Wool, Toby Ziegler, Simon Lee Gallery, Hong Kong (2016)
- Development, Okayama Art Summit, Okayama, Japan (2016)
- Night in the Museum, Wakefield, Birmingham, Leicester, UK (2016)
- L'Almanach 16, Le Consortium, Dijon, France (2016)
- The Natural Order of Things, Fundacíon Jumex, Mexico City, Mexico (2016)
- Faux Amis, Simon Lee Gallery, London, UK (2015)
- Walk the Line, Kunstmuseum Wolfsburg, Germany (2015)
- I Love John Giorno, Palais de Tokyo, Paris, France (2015)
- 1984–1999 The Decade, Centre Pompidou-Metz, France (2015)
- Datascape. What You See is Not What You Get, LABoral, Centro de Arte y Creación Industrial, Gijón, Spain (2014)
- 8th Berlin Biennale, Berlin, Germany (2014)
- The Whole Earth, Haus der Kulturen der Welt, Berlin, Germany (2013)
- Das Neue Lenbachhaus, Lenbachhaus Kunstbau, Munich, Germany (2013)
- Turbulences, L'espace culturel, Louis Vuitton, Paris, France (2012)
- Un Nouveau Festival, 3e Edition, Centre Pompidou, Paris, France (2012)
- theanyspacewhatever, Solomon R. Guggenheim Museum, New York, USA (2008)

== Awards ==
- Canada Council, Visual Artist's Grant, Canada (2011)
- Kunstpreis der Stadt Wolfsburg – Junge Stadt sieht Junge Kunst, Germany (2011)
- Vattenfall Contemporary Art Prize, Germany (2011)
- Preis der Freunde der Nationalgalerie Nomination, Museum für Gegenwartskunst, Germany (2005)
- Cultural Grant of the Asia-Europe Foundation (ASEF), Singapore (2002)
- Turner Prize Nomination, Tate Britain, United Kingdom (1997)
- Artist Residency (two months), ARCUS Project, Japan (1994)
- Whitechapel Artist's Award, United Kingdom (1989)

== Recognition ==
Bulloch was nominated for the Turner Prize in 1997 and for the Preis der Nationalgalerie für junge Kunst in 2005.
