= Art Metropole =

- Established: 26 October 1974
- Location: 896 College St, Toronto, Ontario, Canada
- Coordinates: 43.65417°N 79.42561°W
- Executive director: Blair Swann
- Library Services Manager: Tess Davey
- President: Brian Sholis
- Curator: Dallas Fellini
- Website: artmetropole.com

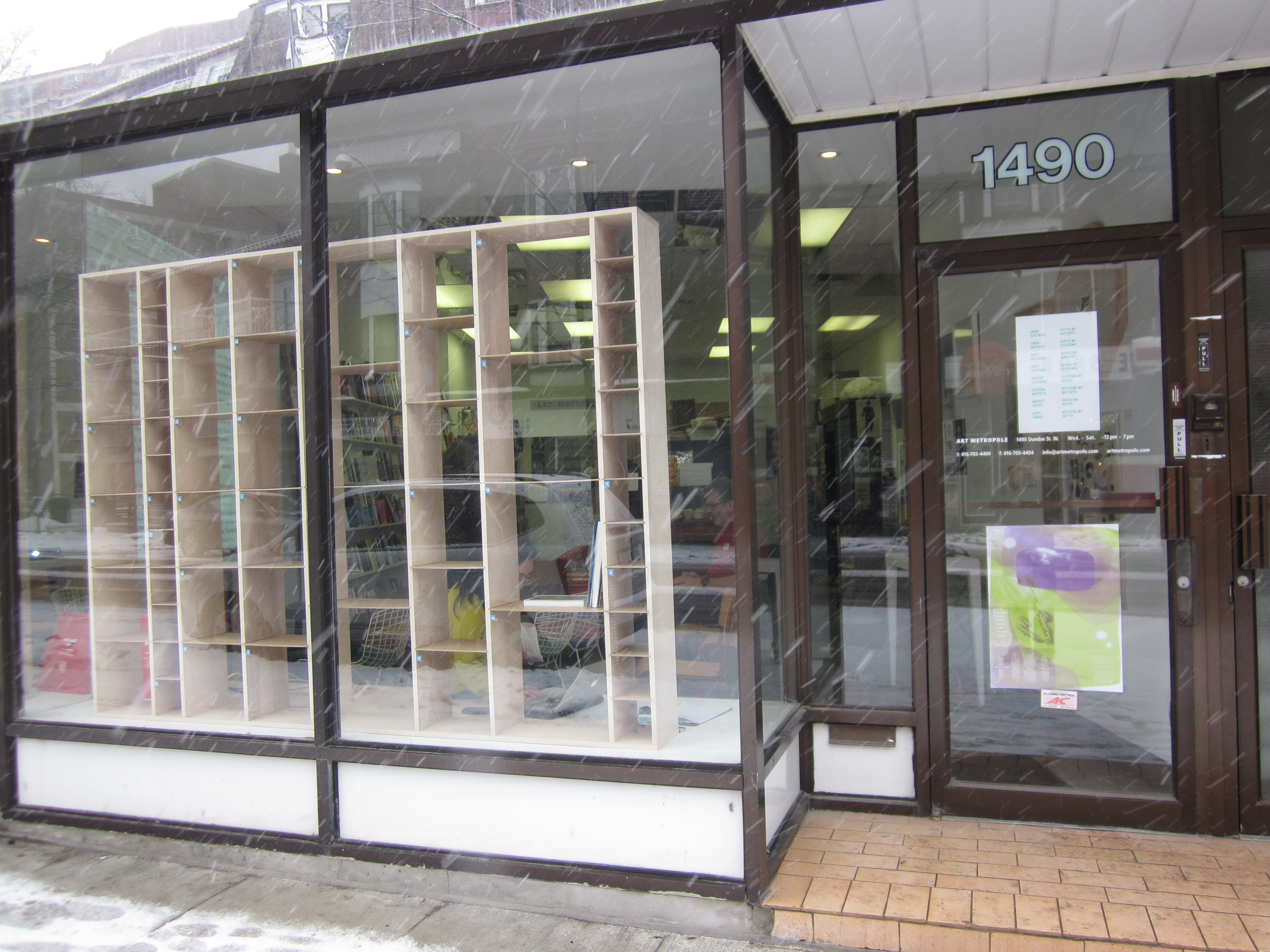
Former location of Art Metropole on Dundas Street West in Toronto

Art Metropole is an artist-run centre that publishes, promotes, exhibits, archives and distributes artists' publications and other materials. Art Metropole was founded in 1974 by the Canadian artist collective General Idea as a division of Art-Official, Inc.(1972), a not-for-profit corporation incorporated under the laws of the province of Ontario. Art Metropole specializes in contemporary art in multiple format: artists books, multiples, video, audio, electronic media, and offers these artists' products for sale on the premises and through their web site. It is currently located at 896 College Street in Toronto, Canada.

== History ==
Art Metropole was founded in 1974 by the artist collective General Idea. Since 1972, the collective had been publishing their periodical FILE Megazine, which saw enormous interest internationally. As a means for other artists to access their distribution system, the group founded Art Metropole, which soon became a focused archive of artists' materials, especially artists books, periodicals, video, audio, and ephemera. In 1974, they opened their doors to the public in an abandoned space over a Greek restaurant in downtown Toronto. The building had originally been built in 1911 for one of Toronto's earliest art galleries – Art Metropole (which closed in the forties) – from which they took the name.

In 1975 Peggy Gale joined Art Metropole to initiate Art Metropole's video distribution service, one of the first in the world. This service was discontinued in 1987 when Art Metropole began publishing artists' video in low-cost VHS format for general distribution instead.

Art Metropole began publishing books in the late 70s. "Performance by Artists" in 1977 was the first of a series of resource books on new artists' media. The same year Art Metropole published "3 death stories" by Tom Sherman, the first of a long series of artists books.

Although Art Metropole hosted video screenings and book launches, it did not undertake an exhibition until 1982, when it toured the seminal exhibition "Museums by Artists". In 1984 it presented the first exhibition on their own premises, a tenth anniversary overview of the Art Metropole Collection. In the late 80s, it established a small exhibition/display space and began its regular exhibition program.

In the meantime, Art Metropole continued to produce a series of innovative distribution-based projects such as "Ads by Artists" (1987) and "Billboards by Artists" (1997). In both cases, it commissioned artists to produce art works for conventional advertising space; in one case in the advertising section of international art magazines, in the other, on billboards in downtown Toronto.

In 1997 Art Metropole transferred their permanent collection of over 13,000 items to the National Gallery of Canada as the Art Metropole Collection.
