= Real Art Ways =

Non-profit art space in Connecticut, U.S.

- Former names: RAW
- Location: 56 Arbor Street; Hartford Connecticut, U.S.
- Type: Art and event space
- Events: Art exhibitions, film screenings, music, theater, literary, community events

Construction
- Opened: 1975; 51 years ago

Website
- www.realartways.org

Real Art Ways is a non-profit art space established in 1975. Located at 56 Arbor Street in the Parkville neighborhood of Hartford, Connecticut, Real Art Ways exhibits visual art, houses an independent cinema and presents live music, theater, and literary and community events.

It has shown such artists as Sol LeWitt, Pepon Osorio, Jenny Holzer, Cindy Sherman, Robert Longo, David Salle, Roxy Paine, and Louise Bourgeois. Real Art Ways has also hosted notable performances by John Cage, Philip Glass, Ornette Coleman, Steve Reich, Laurie Anderson, Allen Ginsberg and others. The cinema at Real Art Ways regularly wins Best Art Cinema in the Hartford Advocate's annual Best of Hartford awards.

== History ==
Real Art Ways was founded in 1975 by artists Ruth Cutler, Dan R. Talley, Al Baccili, Joseph Celli and Stan Sharshal.

In 1982, Real Art Ways (R.A.W.) sued the comics magazine RAW over its name.

== Public Art ==
Real Art Ways has presented a number of public art projects in Hartford, Connecticut. This includes an installation by the sound artist Alvin Lucier. Most recently, Real Public 2009 included work by Margarida Correia, Satch Hoyt, Sofia Maldonado and Matthew Rodriguez.
