= Esther Schipper =

German art dealer and gallerist (born 1963)

- Born: 1963 (age 62–63); Taiwan
- Occupations: Art dealer and gallerist
- Partner: Florian Wojnar
- Children: 2
- Parent: Kristofer Schipper

Esther Schipper (born 1963) is a German art dealer and gallerist.

== Early life ==
Schipper is the daughter of Dutch sinologist Kristofer Schipper. She was born in Taiwan and lived there until the age of seven. She later grew up in Paris.

== Career ==
Schipper gained her first professional experience as an assistant at the Monika Sprüth Gallery in Cologne in 1983/84.

Schipper opened her first gallery in Cologne in 1989. Between 1990 and 1992, Schipper and Daniel Buchholz also operated Buchholz & Schipper, a shop specializing in multiples. In cooperation with Michael Krome, the gallery operated under the name Schipper & Krome between 1994 and 2004.

In 1995, Schipper opened a project space in Berlin, and moved all of its operations there in 1997. From 2010 until 2017, the gallery was located in a 500 m^{2} (5,400 sq ft) space in the former offices of architect Arno Brandlhuber in Berlin's Tiergarten district. Following negotiations launched in 2014, Schipper acquired the majority shareholding in Jörg Johnen GmbH in 2015 and then took over both galleries' sites; the Johnen location eventually closed.

In 2017, Esther Schipper moved to a 5,800 sq ft (540 m^{2}) space located inside a former printing facility and warehouse for the local Berlin newspaper Der Tagesspiegel on Potsdamer Strasse; the space was designed by Selldorf Architects. In 2021, the gallery had temporary spaces in Palma de Mallorca (500 m^{2} (5,400 sq ft)), Zhongshan District, Taipei (250 m^{2} (2,700 sq ft)) and the Tianjin Free-Trade Zone. Since 2022, the gallery has been operating second location in Paris and a third showroom in a four-story building in Seoul's Itaewon neighbourhood, designed by StudioMDA.

In addition to her work as a gallerist, Schipper was a member of the Art Basel art fair's selection committee for ten years and later joined the selection committee of Frieze Art Fair in New York. She was also one of the co-founders of Berlin's annual Gallery Weekend.

=== Artists ===
Esther Schipper represents several living artists, including:

- AA Bronson
- Angela Bulloch
- Thomas Demand
- Simon Fujiwara (since 2018)
- Ryan Gander
- Liam Gillick
- Pierre Huyghe
- Ann Veronica Janssens
- Annette Kelm (since 2024)
- Gabriel Kuri
- Jac Leirner (since 2020),
- Isa Melsheimer
- Philippe Parreno
- Anri Sala (since 2015)
- Karin Sander
- Tino Sehgal (since 2015)
- Daniel Steegmann Mangrané (since 2015)

In addition, the gallery manages various artist estates, including:

- Rodney Graham (since 2015)

== Personal life ==
Schipper lives in Mitte, Berlin, with her partner Florian Wojnar and their two children.
