= Felix Partz =

Canadian artist (1945–1994)

Ronald Gabe (1945 in Winnipeg, Manitoba – 1994), publicly known as Felix Partz, was a Canadian artist and cofounder of the artistic collective General Idea with Jorge Zontal and AA Bronson.

Partz studied at the University of Manitoba School of Art in Winnipeg, experimenting with conceptual art. During his studies, Partz created Some Art That I Like (1967), a series of copies of more famous works and an example of appropriation. The artist traveled in Europe and North Africa before settling in Toronto by 1969, where he ultimately became a member of the collective General Idea.

He died on June 5, 1994, of AIDS-related causes. Partz was photographed by collaborator AA Bronson in the final three weeks of his life, laying in bed alongside many of his favorite clothes and objects, including a photograph taken a few hours after his death, now held by the Whitney Museum. Though graphic, the image is considered one of General Idea's most significant works, documenting the devastation of the AIDS epidemic in the 1980s and 1990s.

At the time of his death he had just finished work on a series of AIDS-related General Idea projects that incorporated mutated simulations of works by Piet Mondrian and Marcel Duchamp.

Canadian musician Peaches recorded a song entitled "Felix Partz" on her album The Teaches of Peaches.
