= Temporary Services =

Art group based in United States and Denmark

Temporary Services is an art group of three people based in Chicago, Illinois, Philadelphia, Pennsylvania (USA), and Copenhagen, Denmark. Temporary Services has created art projects, public events, publications, and exhibitions since 1998.

On their web site, they state:

We champion public projects that are temporary, ephemeral, or that operate outside of conventional or officially sanctioned categories of public expression.

Temporary Services states a desire to not preference any type of activity or object as art, or any audience. They also work against the constructed link between aesthetics and ethics. They view art as activism, and carry on the traditions of situationism.

Temporary services became an Artadia awardee in the 2004 Chicago cycle.

== Prisoners' Inventions ==
A project between the Temporary Services and an incarcerated artist Angelo. Angelo produced a large body of work documenting in detail the inventions created by prisoners in the United States.

Prisoners' Inventions is a book, a travelling exhibition, and an ongoing collaborative project. This exhibit has been shown in the United States, Germany, Spain, and the United Kingdom.

== The Library Project ==
The Harold Washington Library Center in Chicago was the location for one of Temporary Services' projects. The group surreptitiously added over 150 books designed by artists and others into the library's collection. The books are provided with all the same due dates, reference stickers purchased from the same provider used by the library itself.

This project was executed without any permission or input from the Chicago Public Library system. It was an effort to explore the boundaries of archival systems and make library patrons and library staff alike reexamine the notion of where books are categorized and placed in the library. Many books by artists are placed in the library's art reference area by default.

One book by artist and geographer Trevor Paglen contained a small motion detector to make sounds when a person walks by, effectively serving as a ghost book. Artists Rob Kelly and Zena Sakowski produced three books which folded out into a jacket, a pair of pants, and a balaclava. Books were also placed in the library by other writers, artists, and activist groups. Many of the books were eventually "accepted" by the library and re-categorized. They were given official library codes and placed into the library's system. Many of the books simply disappeared from the shelves after a few months.

== Public Sculpture Opinion Poll ==
Public spaces are meeting points for both the powerful and the powerless. Governments or businesses select art pieces to be shown in public spaces and the public's response is generally one of passive gossip or direct attack.

The Public Sculpture Opinion Poll was a direct inquiry into the placement of one sculpture in Chicago at the intersection of Grand and Western Avenues. The sculpture, a large configuration of welded utility poles and paint, was officially "donated" to the city of Chicago by a neighborhood Chamber of Commerce masquerading as a neighborhood community group.

Temporary Services started a public dialogue about the sculpture—why and how did it get there? Clipboards were hung at each corner of the busy intersection, with pens and pieces of paper. The paper had the question "What do you think of this sculpture and why do you think it was placed in this neighborhood?" on the top, along with three small photos of the sculpture itself printed along the bottom.

Members of Temporary Services returned to the clipboard sites twice daily for six weeks, collecting responses and replenishing the clipboards with more printed pages and pens. After the end of six weeks, over 1000 responses were collected ... positive, negative, and all over the place. The responses were then compiled into a booklet and traveling exhibition which has been shared with the City of Chicago's Department of Public Art as a more democratic and populist option for gathering opinions about public space.

== Networking ==
Temporary Services through their art pages, community sites, blogs, and extensive network aim to provide a network for the collection and distribution of artistic work going on looking at the line between art and ethics, power and art, and the role of the public. The critical place of the public, generally dismissed in modernist and post-modernist art, is central to their work which aims at creating projects that undermine conventional politics of art.

== Temporary Services membership ==
Members: Brett Bloom, Salem Collo-Julin, Marc Fischer Started: 1998

== Exhibit history ==
Temporary Services' recent exhibitions and projects include:

- "Incorporated" at Contemporary Art Center in Cincinnati, Ohio,
- "Transmediale 05" (with Angelo) at Haus der Kulturen der Welt in Berlin (2005),
- "Borne of Necessity" (with Dave Whitman) at Weatherspoon Art Museum, University of North Carolina at Greensboro in Greensboro, NC,
- "Services" at Colgate University in Hamilton, New York (2004),
- "Fantastic!" (with Angelo) at MASS MoCA in North Adams, Massachusetts (2003–2004),
- "Get rid of yourself" (with Angelo, Brennan McGaffey and others) at ACC, Weimar and Halle 14 in Leipzig (2003),
- "Puerto Rico '02 [en ruta]" (with Zena Sakowski and Rob Kelly) in San Juan,
- "Critical Mass" at Smart Museum in Chicago (2002),
- "The Library Project" organized by Temporary Services at Temporary Services' office space and The Harold Washington Library in Chicago (2001),
- "Public Sculpture Opinion Poll", organized by Temporary Services in public space, Chicago (2000).
