= FILE Megazine =

FILE Megazine (published 1972–1989) was a quarterly, then irregularly published art and culture magazine, published by the non-profit Art-Official Inc. and written, edited and published primarily by members of General Idea (there were guest contributors throughout its run, and later on, sometimes guest editors).

== History and profile ==
The magazine was founded with a grant from the Canadian federal government. This grant allowed for the creation and publication of the first three issues. After that, the magazine was funded by support from its subscribers, advertisers and the Canada Council for the Arts.

The visual design and identity of FILE Megazine was a deliberate appropriation of the defunct Life magazine. FILE's initial logo was the white block letters on red rectangle of the "LIFE" logo, with the letters re-arranged. This corresponded with the group's desire that the magazine be a "parasite within the world of magazine distribution". The familiarity of the format would entice a broad range of unsuspecting readers outside the art- or mail-art worlds.

Initially the magazine served a dual purpose. It was a record and site of activity for the mail/correspondence-art movement. Material for the magazine was sourced from submissions by a network of mail-art correspondents (fostered by General Idea's national and international connections), and can thus be said that the magazine was the first mail-art project in magazine format. Each issue featured a directory of the members of this network, including their pseudonyms (the adoption of which was a common practice amongst members) and addresses. Via this list, members could publish requests for found images (the list was discontinued from the magazine in 1976).

The magazine was also the mouthpiece of General Idea, and in this sense, was used as a way for the artist group to release a kind of propagandistic self-referential self-promotion. Editorials for each issue were written by the group, and were elaborations of the group's core conceptual principles, and furthered their own self-mythology; the editorial of the Glamour Issue (1975) for instance, is widely thought to be a kind of manifesto on General Idea's operating principles. The writing style of these editorials is noteworthy for its heavily ironic use of language, a parody of advertising copy, laced with double-entendres.

As the mail-art movement subsided, the focus of FILE Megazine broadened to include the wider arts, culture and entertainment world. Notable cover models in this later period include Debbie Harry and Tina Turner.

== Controversy ==
In 1976, the Time/Life Corporation sued General Idea for copyright infringement (the corporation held the copyright for white block lettering on a red parallelogram), and demanded that the group cease publication of the magazine. General Idea received a great deal of publicity and sympathetic support. An article appeared in The Village Voice, which included a stern condemnation of the lawsuit by Robert Hughes, Time magazine's then art editor.

The lawsuit was eventually settled in 1977, with General Idea changing the logo and format of the magazine.

The magazine continued to publish until 1989. A re-issue of the magazine's entire run was published in by JRP|Ringier in 2008.
