= Jorge Zontal =

Slobodan Saia-Levy (born 1944 in Parma, Italy – February 3, 1994), publicly known as his pseudonym Jorge Zontal, was a Canadian artist.

== Life ==
Zontal was born in Parma, Italy, in 1944, the son of Yugoslav refugees. He grew up in Caracas, Venezuela, and in 1968 he earned a degree in architecture at Dalhousie University in Halifax, Nova Scotia, where he also studied film making and acting. Zontal died in Toronto on February 3, 1994, of AIDS-related causes.

== Work ==
Soon after graduation, he met Felix Partz and AA Bronson while working on a film in Toronto and their group, General Idea, formed in 1969, soon became an active part of the Canadian and then the international art scene. They made plans for the Miss General Idea Pageant and the 1984 Miss General Idea Pavilion as early as 1970. Their multi-disciplinary work partakes of parody and includes photographic elements. They sought publicity and theatre using as media, videos, scripts, artifacts and other forms of documentation to engage the art world and themselves.
