= General Idea =

Canadian art collective

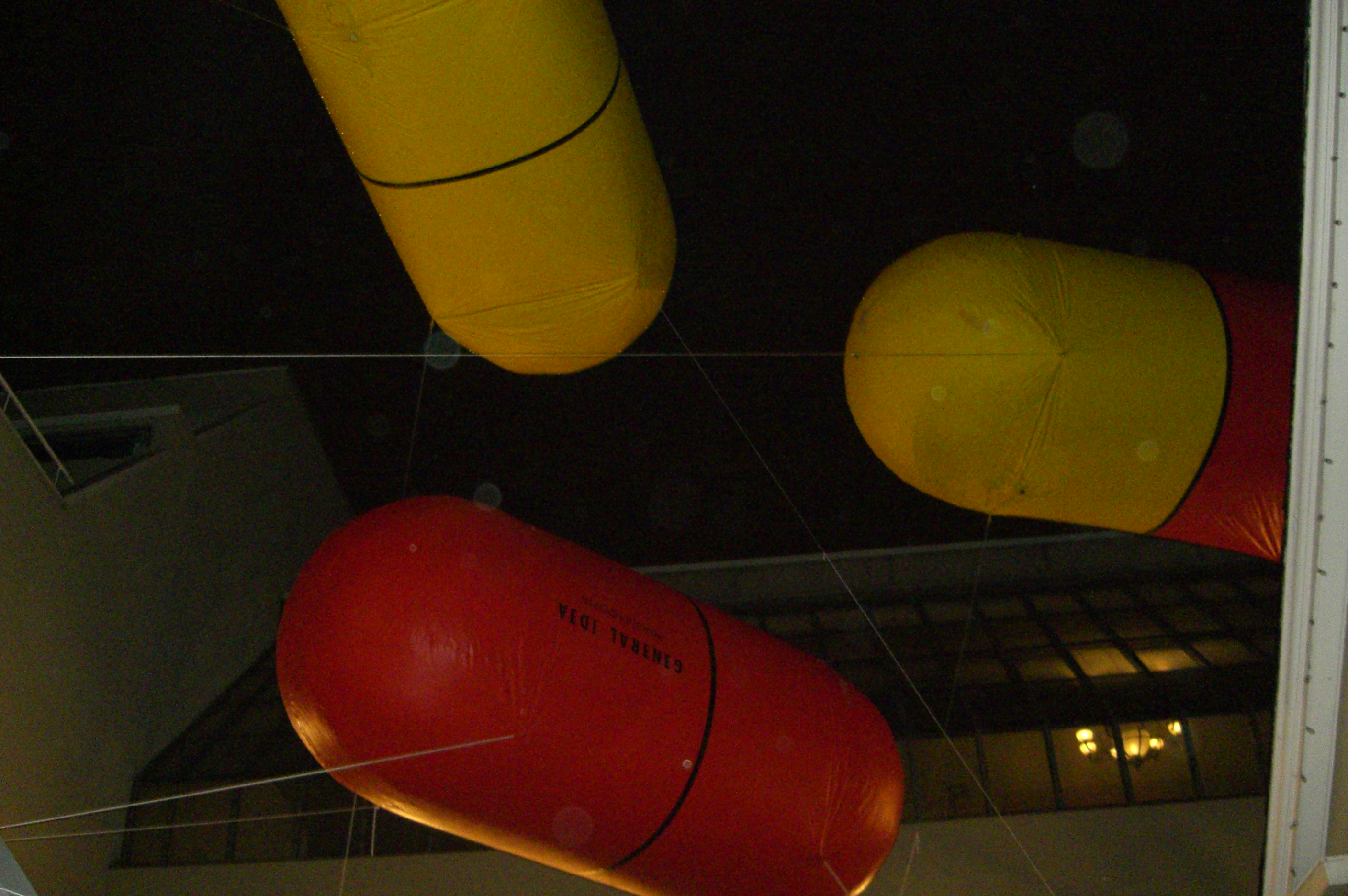
PLA©EBO

General Idea was a collective of three Canadian artists, Felix Partz, Jorge Zontal and AA Bronson, who were active from 1967 to 1994. As pioneers of early conceptual and media-based art, their collaboration became a model for artist-initiated activities and continues to be a prominent influence on subsequent generations of artists.

Initially working in Toronto, from 1968 through 1993 they divided their time between Toronto and New York before returning to Toronto for the last few months of their time together.

General Idea's work inhabited and subverted forms of popular and media culture, including boutiques, television talk shows, trade fair pavilions, mass media and beauty pageants. The beauty pageant, The 1971 Miss General Idea Pageant, allowed for both male and female artists to send in pictures of themselves wearing the taffeta dress provided. Their work was often presented in unconventional media forms such as postcards, prints, posters, wallpaper, balloons, crests and pins. Self-mythology was a continuous strategy that informed their work. They created a fictional system that self-referenced and self-legitimized, claiming a space for their local art scene in Canada. Their intent was to reach a greater audience and so their work moved from art galleries and museums to newsstands. This ensured that different types of people who spent time in different places could have a psychological or social reaction in a place comfortable to them. General Idea initially portrayed themselves as an ambiguous group, but soon realized this approach was causing confusion with the public. This led to a series of self portrayal or marketing images including "Fin de Siècle".

From 1987 through 1994 their work addressed the AIDS crisis, with work that included some 75 temporary public art projects. Their major installation, One Year of AZT/One Day of AZT, was featured as a project at the Museum of Modern Art and now resides in the collection of the National Gallery of Canada. In 2006 the three giant inflatable pills from their 1991 work PLA©EBO were displayed during Toronto's Nuit blanche.

After publishing FILE Megazine for two years and amassing a large collection of artists books and multiples, General Idea founded Art Metropole in 1974, a non-profit space dedicated to contemporary art in multiple formats: artists books, multiples, video, audio and electronic media.

Both Partz and Zontal died of AIDS in 1994. Bronson continues to work and exhibit as an independent artist, and was the director of Printed Matter, Inc in New York between 2006 and 2011. The General Idea archive now resides at the Library and Archives of the National Gallery of Canada.

In June 2022, the National Gallery of Canada launched a major retrospective show of the group's work.

== Pre-General Idea ==
AA Bronson (aka Michael Tims, b June 16, 1946, Vancouver, British Columbia) attended the University of Manitoba in the School of Architecture. He dropped out of university with a group of friends to found a commune and free school. There, he became involved in writing and publishing as an editor for the Loving Couch Press. He became heavily involved with the commune and radical education movements.

Felix Partz (aka Ronald Gabe, b April 23, 1945, Winnipeg, Manitoba; d 1994, Toronto, Canada) was also a student at the University of Manitoba, studying painting under Kenneth Lochhead. He developed a casual acquaintance with Bronson there.

Jorge Zontal (aka Slobodan Saia-Levy, b January 28, 1944, Parma Italy; d 1994, Toronto, Canada) arrived in Caracas, Venezuela as a post-WWII refugee. He later went to Dalhousie University to study architecture, and became increasingly involved with filmmaking. This interest took him to New York to take acting lessons. By 1968, he studied video recording at Simon Fraser University, and had established links with the Vancouver art scene. He took a workshop with dancer Deborah Hay at Intermedia. He briefly met Bronson while in Vancouver.

=== Meeting in Toronto ===
Bronson came to Toronto in 1969, specifically to investigate and participate in the Rochdale College experiment. Partz's then-girlfriend Mimi Paige was involved in Rochdale College, and Partz arrived in Toronto the same year, both to visit Paige and to find a gallerist. Zontal also arrived in Toronto in 1969, with the intention of filming a documentary at Theatre Passe Muraille. Paige, Partz, Bronson and Zontal all subsequently became involved in the scene in and surrounding Passe Muraille, which forged their initial collaboration.

Before long, the four, along with actor Danny Freedman, moved into a house at 78 Gerrard St, which eventually became the first General Idea Headquarters. Their neighbour from across the street, Sharon Venne (aka Granada Venne or Granada Gazelle), quickly became a part of the group. The name General Idea was, in fact, the result of a miscommunication at their first group exhibition, Concept 70. A Space listed the title of the group's work as the name of the collective, and the mistake stuck. Bronson would later joke that it was a reference to the "general idea" of the group's work.

== Early Work (1969–1975) ==
The central themes that would preoccupy General Idea throughout their career—self-mythologization, spectacle, appropriation, parody, media deconstruction, an ironic interest in commerce and the semiotics of advertising language—were clearly present in the early days of the group. They shared an interest in the forms and methods of popular culture and mass media, and were influenced by the writing of Marshall McLuhan, William Burroughs, and by the Situationist International.

The earliest activities of the group involved the use of their home: creating ersatz commercial shops, only visible to the general public through the street-facing window (a sign was always posted saying that the store would be open in 5 minutes), and creating installations and hosting exhibitions in their living room. They worked on an uncompleted film (God is my Gigolo, 1969) which starred the five cohabitants, and also included Honey Novick and Tina Miller. Bronson executed a series of chain-letter mail art projects, sparked by his interest in correspondence networks and mail art.

It was via this participation in mail-art correspondence networks that the members of the group began using pseudonyms. Gabe became Private Partz, then Felicks Partz, then Felix Partz. Tims took on the name AA Bronson while co-writing an erotic novel with Susan Harrison (AA Bronson was a confusion of his nom de plume which stuck), and Saia-Levy became Jorge Zontal after a popular jazz song "I Just Want to be Horizontal".

=== What Happened (1970) ===
What Happened was a multimedia event organized for the International Festival of Underground Theatre at the St Lawrence Centre for the Arts and the Global Village Theatre in Toronto. The group's contribution was a multi-part performance based on Gertrude Stein's first play (also called What Happened). The whole play, in 5 acts and 4 intermissions, was spread across the three weeks of the festival. Events happened both within and without the theatre centre, variously documented by tape recorder, Polaroid cameras, sketch pads and VTR recorders. The documentation was sent to the theatre and displayed there. Among the performances that occurred during one of the intermissions was the 1970 Miss General Idea Pageant, which "crowned" Novick as Miss General Idea 1970. Paige and Gazelle were revealed as Miss General Ideas 1968 and 1969 (an inclusion that gave rise to the fiction that General Idea was formed in 1968).

=== Mail Art Projects (1970–71) ===
General Idea initiated two large-scale mail art projects: the Orgasm Energy Chart (inviting participants to log the time and date of their orgasms) and Manipulating the Self: Phase 1 – A Borderline Case (1970–71). Participants were asked to photograph themselves holding the side of their head, and send the documentation to General Idea (who had since left their Gerrard St location for 87 Yonge St). The results were published in an eponymous pamphlet. Participation in these projects was facilitated via contact with Ray Johnson and his New York Correspondence School and the foundation of Image Bank by Michael Morris, Gary Lee-Nova and Vincent Trasov—all General Idea collaborators/participants—in Vancouver.

=== The 1971 Miss General Idea Pageant ===
Performed at the Art Gallery of Ontario, the Pageant was General Idea's major project for the year, created via the mail art network. Sixteen finalists were pre-selected, and sent an Entry Kit by mail. The kit was a box, silkscreened with the Pageant logo, containing various items: a brown dress (the Miss General Idea Gown), a typed letter of invitation by Granada Gazelle (Miss General Idea 1969), a General Idea business card, the Pageant program, an application form, an acceptance card, and photographs of Miss Honey (Miss General Idea 1970) and the Artist's Conception of Miss General Idea 1971.

Finalists were asked to respond with a series of photographs of themselves modelling the Miss General Idea Gown. Of the sixteen people contacted, thirteen people responded. One person – artist Janis Campbell – refused, accusing the group of being "male chauvinist pigs." General Idea took her response as an entry.

The pageant was conceived of and executed as if it was a live-broadcast televised spectacle, and appropriated all of its conventions, including glamorous pre-show red carpet arrival. Audience reactions and cues were rehearsed. The judges for the Pageant were Dorothy Cameron, an art consultant, and David Silcox, a former visual arts officer of the Canada Council, the then-Dean of the Fine Art Department at York University.

The Pageant, while successful, was an enormous undertaking. The members of General Idea decided that they couldn't face organizing such an event on an annual basis. They decided that the next Pageant would take place in 1984, and the group's projects and performances would be either in service of, or explicit rehearsals for this moment. Furthermore, it would take place in a huge Pavillion (the largesse of it reflected in the tongue-in-cheek appropriation of the French spelling) built precisely for the purpose.

The selection of the date of 1984 gave the group a goal, or deadline: to stay together and work together until that year. The Pageant format, and the implied timeline set by the deadline of 1984, provided them with a kind of thematic universe in which all their media experiments could be collected. Conceptually, the Pageant concretized the various self-mythologizing aspects of the General Idea project: an inhabitation and ambiguous parodying of the creative processes of the artist and the fame/commercial processes of the art world.

=== FILE Megazine (1972–1989) ===
In 1972, the group founded FILE Megazine. The publication served a dual purpose. The editorials of the magazine elaborated the group's major ideas. It also initially served as way for members of the mail art network to keep in contact with each other, and as a record of their activities. The magazine quickly garnered a worldwide following. The name and design of the magazine were meticulous spoofs of Life, and the collective hoped to use the visual familiarity as "a kind of virus within the communication systems." In volume 3, no. 1: The Glamour Issue (1975), they asserted that "in order to be glamorous we had to become plagiarists." FILE ran for 26 issues, and was instrumental in the formation of a network of Canadian Artist-run centres, serving as a vehicle for artist's projects and the "wisecracks, wordplay, and cryptic layers of fact and fiction" of General Idea's self-mythologizing sensibilities.

=== The 1984 Miss General Idea Pavillion ===
In 1973, as the mail-art phenomenon had begun to fade, General Idea switched their focus towards the creation of the 1984 Miss General Idea Pavillion. The group began to create a series of architectural proposals that articulated various aspects of the Pavillion. The first realized installation was Luxon VB, a set of double-sided mirrored Venetian blind slats. They also collected a series of talismans: The Hand of the Spirit (an effete, arched hand made of plexiglas and mounted on a wand-like handle, which originally appeared in Vincent Trasov's entry for the 1971 Miss General Idea Pageant) and The Miss General Idea Shoe. This was all under the rubric of the Search for the Spirit of Miss General Idea – in the group's conceptual framework, an analogy for artistic inspiration and research. This framework served as a structuring principle for future performances (which continued to take the form of audience rehearsals).

In 1974, General Idea opened Art Metropole, an archive, shop and distribution centre for artist's multiples and ephemera. The announcement came via FILE Megazine: "Art Metropole intends to keep abreast of the tide, housing and distributing evidence of activity and imagery: megazines [sic], publications, videos, correspondence, snapshots, memories and the ephemeral flood.". The shop opened on October 26 of that year, the occasion used as another opportunity to rehearse the public for the 1984 Miss General Idea Pageant.

In 1975, the group staged another performance, Going Thru the Motions, again at the Art Gallery of Ontario. Similar in structure to the 1971 Miss General Idea Pageant (this time including a crew of 40 people, including cameramen who recorded everything, and all the trappings of pageant or awards-show glamour), this was another audience rehearsal. The evening featured a parade of the VB Gowns (a series of ziggurat-shaped 'gowns' made of manipulated Venetian blind slats) and a performance by Rough Trade.

Going Thru the Notions was shown at the Carmen Lamanna Gallery in the same year. The exhibition was a summary of the group's thinking around the 1984 Miss General Idea project. It featured architectural blueprints, the Pavillion Hoarding (installed outside the storefront window of the gallery), as well as their Showcards Series (1975–79), an articulation of themes and beliefs central to the overarching Miss General Idea project.

== 1975-1985 ==
The group announced, via a huge performance (done as part of a residency in Kingston, Ontario), the destruction of the 1984 Miss General Idea Pavillion in 1977. The performance was spectacular, featuring smoke-bombs, fire trucks and a newscast helicopter.

The destruction of the Pavillion coincided with the group's increasing profile, both in Canada and in Europe. As they kept having more shows, the performative destruction allowed them to shift roles as artists, from self-styled architects to archeologists, and gave them a conceptual grounding to shift into a more object-based art practice (as had begun to happen with the Showcards and the architectural "features" of the Pavillion-to-be).

A series of sculptures, prints and paintings were created as "fragments" or "ruins" of the destroyed Pavillion. The group used these fragments to further play with then-outré concepts: glamour, effeminacy, camp and kitsch, and by extension, homosexuality. The group adopted the poodle as their mascot. The animal appeared as a constantly repeating motif. It also served as a symbol not only of self-identification, but also as a vessel through which the group could continue their strategy of media appropriation, which in turn allowed them to respond to the artistic exigencies of operating within the larger international gallery world. The poodle images were vehicles for a series of stylistic appropriations, for instance, the orgiastic Neo-Geo Mondo Cane Kama Sutra paintings.

The group also created a series of videos in this period. Pilot (1977) was commissioned by TVOntario, Test Tube (1979) was created during a residency at the De Appel Gallery and produced for Dutch television. Shut the Fuck Up (1984) was likewise commissioned by De Appel, this time in collaboration with Time Based Arts, also for Dutch television. Pilot, an appropriation of the documentary format, is a further elaboration of the General Idea identity. Test Tube (a faux-soap opera, complete with commercials) and Shut the Fuck Up are deconstructions of and confrontations with the media distortion of the persona of the artist.

The group had been, throughout their career thus far, making multiples and editions, each of which was a further elaboration of, or in some way tied to an existing General Idea work. For instance, the products discussed in the Test Tube video "commercials" were turned into actual multiples (and by extension, the text of the commercials became the Getting Into the Spirits Cocktail Book, an ersatz cocktail recipe book). In 1980, the group created the Boutique of the 1984 Miss General Idea Pavillion. It functioned as both a display strategy and potential point of sale for General Idea's multiples.

== AIDS and IMAGEVIRUS: 1986-1994 ==
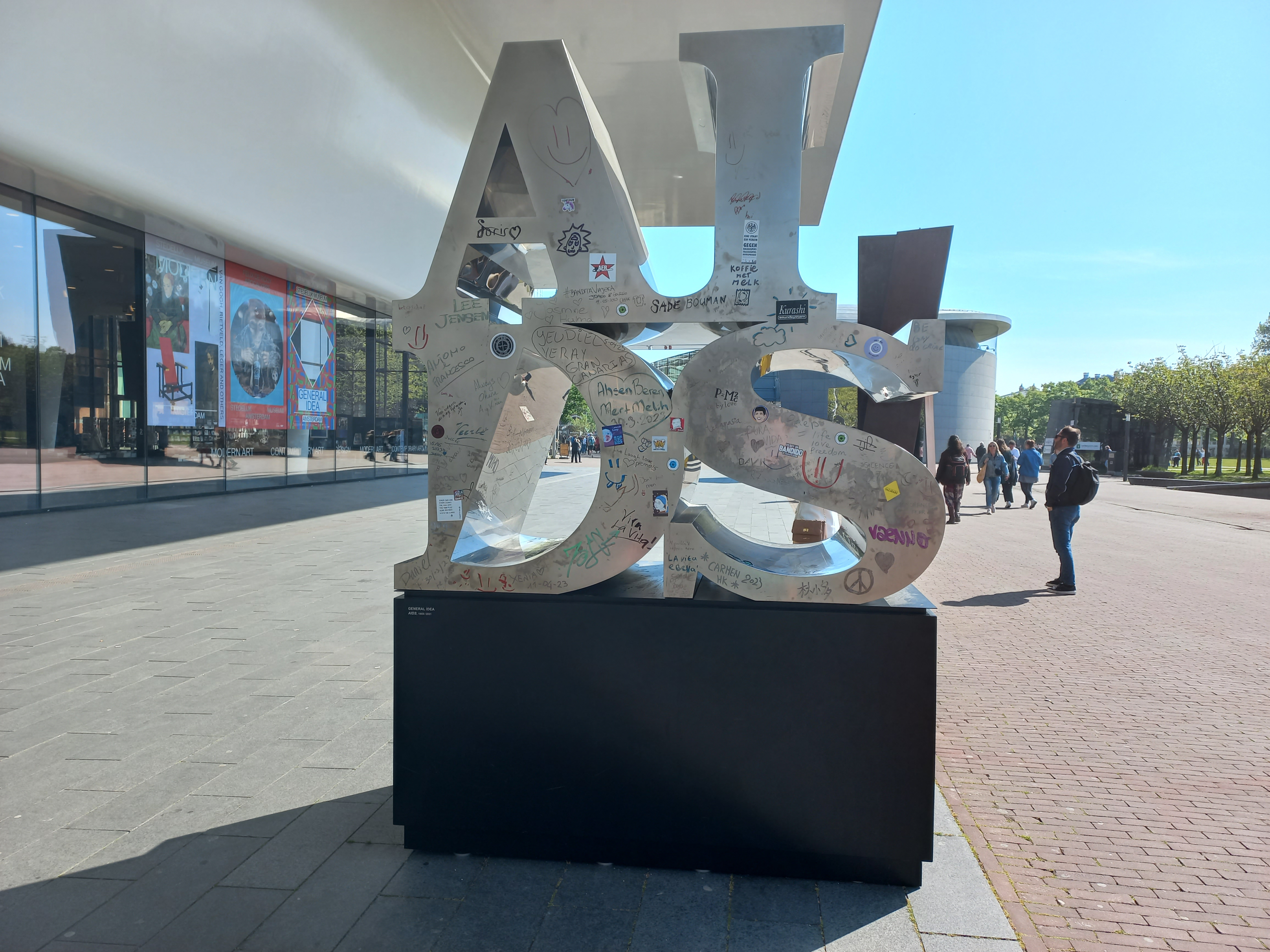
AIDS Sculpture in front of the Stedelijk Museum

General Idea's attention was increasingly focused on New York, specifically the downtown art scene. The eventual move to New York City was precipitated by an increase anti-LGBT policing in Toronto at the time (Zontal was caught in one of the routine bathhouse raids performed by police), by a backlash in Toronto against non-material art practices, as well as the group's perceived disproportionate ubiquity and clout in the city's small art scene. They relocated to New York City in 1986.

=== AIDS Paintings and IMAGEVIRUS ===
The first AIDS painting was created for an amfAR benefit. It is an appropriation of Robert Indiana's by-then ubiquitous LOVE logo (substituting, in the same visual arrangement and color composition, the letters L-O-V-E with A-I-D-S). General Idea intended for their AIDS logo to get "out of their control" and they found themselves successful when the logo showed up on lottery tickets, posters, and more. The group (knowing that the appropriation and the consequent image was in "bad taste" (Note: AA Bronson, quoted in Bordowitz 2010, p. 70)) subsequently decided to repeat the image in a series of paintings. The initial painting was painted on a white canvas in red lettering. It was then changed to exhibit different colored backgrounds with different colored lettering. In one example, the lettering of AIDS was painted on a black and white canvas in gold. Due to the color scheme, it was not obvious to observers that the painting spelled AIDS. This painting was placed on a metal structure and was displayed around the world. Following the paintings, the AIDS logo was turned into a poster campaign called IMAGEVIRUS, where the logo was wheatpasted along big sections of city blocks in New York and San Francisco (and then subsequently Berlin).

The initial reception of the AIDS works was highly controversial, especially among AIDS activists. To them, the General Idea AIDS logo was distanced and ironic, when what was called for was unambiguous and direct (in response, Gran Fury appropriated General Idea's AIDS logo and turned it into RIOT). With IMAGEVIRUS, activists interpreted General Idea as going against what activist artists should be doing, namely countering government neglect, providing safer-sex education and fighting for access to medical treatments. Furthermore, critics claimed that, in its repetitions, it drained the word of meaning at a time when a political battle being waged over the meaning of the disease itself. The IMAGEVIRUS campaign continued to proliferate: as a public art project, it was displayed on the Times Square Spectacolor Board, it adorned the sides of trams in Amsterdam, and was installed in the advertising windows in New York City Subway cars. The image proliferated further, as wallpaper, public sculpture, and, at the behest of medical and charitable organizations, as stamps, postcards, and other ephemera (the image was used on the cover of the New England Journal of Medicine, and remains the logo for Deutsche AIDS Hilfe).

=== Final Years: 1990-1994 ===
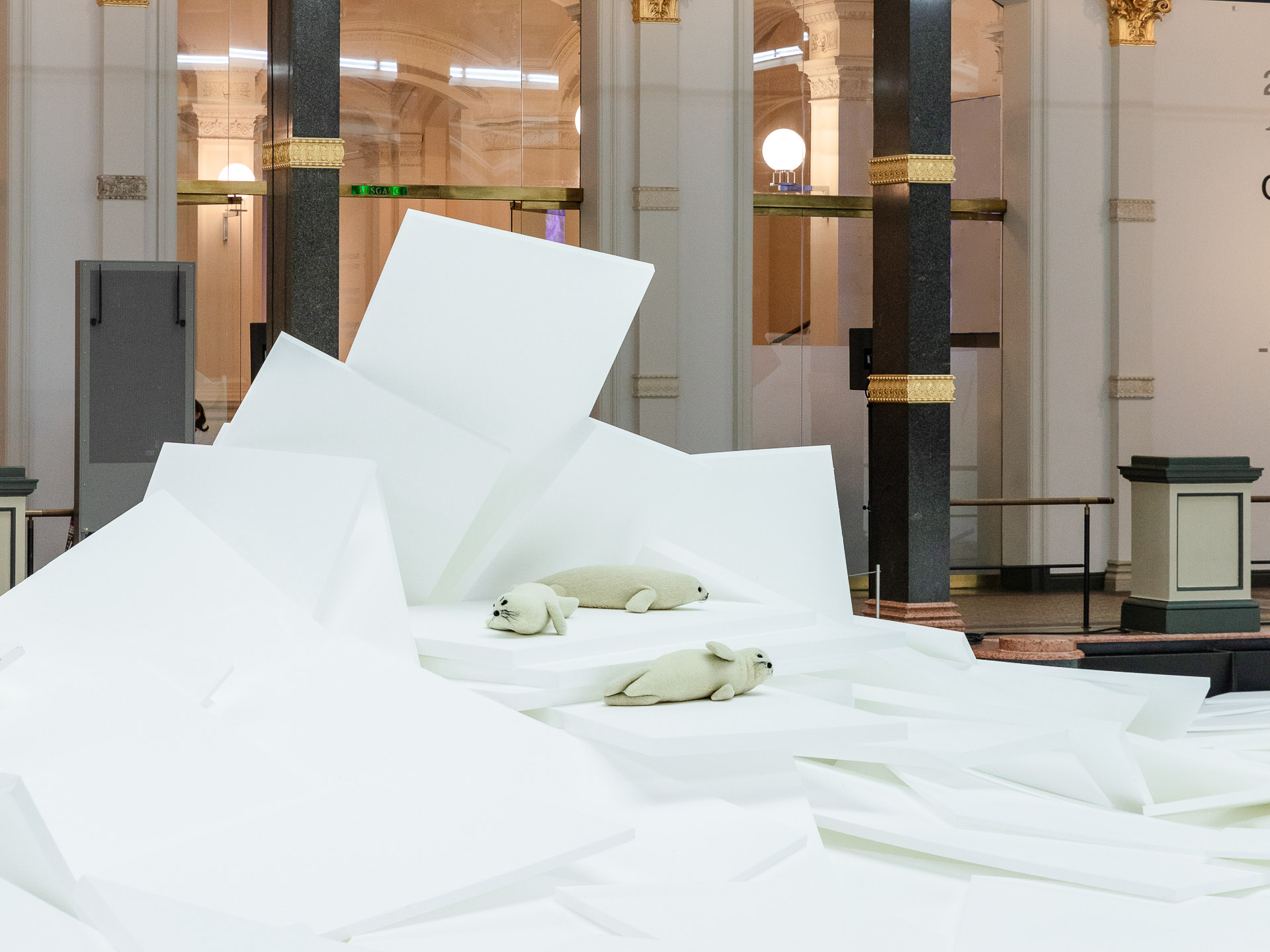
Fin De Siècle (Graci Collection)

With Partz and Zontal's AIDS diagnoses, the group continued to address the AIDS crisis in various ways. They created a large scale installation (Fin de Siecle, 1990): a faux ice floe created from sheets of styrofoam with three stuffed harp seals – a new form of animal familiar for General Idea – isolated at the installation's centre. It addresses the imminence of disaster, isolation and precarity/fragility (a photographic version of the installation was created in 1994, furthering the identification of the members of General Idea with the three endangered seals). The medical/pharmacological realities of daily coping with the disease also appeared in General Idea's work. The pill entered into the group's visual vocabulary, iterated and reiterated in various formats: as helium-filled balloons (a foil version of which was an appropriation Andy Warhol's silver balloons), as a sculptural object of various dimensions (the group created large-scale installations illustrating Partz's and Zontal's AZT intake) and as a backdrop, featured in one of the group's self-portraits, Playing Doctor (1992),

The group continued their practice of viral insertions/appropriations, recasting iconic images by Piet Mondrian and Gerrit Rietveld in the colors of the IMAGEVIRUS campaign.

Partz had been commuting back and forth from Toronto to New York for most of this period. Due to his worsening health however, he remained in Toronto, eventually opting for home hospice care. Zontal and Bronson relocated to Toronto to join him in 1993. Both Zontal and Partz died in Toronto, in 1994.

== Exhibitions ==
Retrospectives of General Idea's work continue to tour Europe and North America. General Idea Editions: 1967-1995 was featured at the Centro Andaluz de Arte Contemporáneo, Seville, Spain from 30 January - 1 April 2007, and included a recreation of the installations Magic Bullet and Magic Carpet, as well as the major installation Fin de Siècle. Before that Editions was exhibited at the Andy Warhol Museum in Pittsburgh, the Munich Kunstverein, Kunstwerke (Berlin), and the Kunsthalle Zürich, Switzerland. General Idea has been featured in the Paris, Sydney, São Paulo and Venice Biennales, as well as at Documenta 8 in Kassel, Germany. Their work continues to be exhibited in group and solo shows worldwide. Recent career retrospectives include Haute Couture at the Musée d'Art Moderne de la ville de Paris, and subsequently toured to the Art Gallery of Ontario in 2010-2011. They had their first Latin American museum show/retrospective, General Idea: Tiempo Partido at Museo Jumex, Mexico City and MALBA, Buenos Aires, in 2016-2017. They continue to have solo exhibitions at Esther Schipper Gallery (Berlin), Mai 36 Galerie (Zürich), Maureen Paley (London) and Mitchell-Innes and Nash. A touring career retrospective, General Idea, was on exhibition at the National Gallery of Canada until November 20, 2022. It ran at the Stedelijk Museum (Amsterdam) from April to mid-July 2023, and is set to run at the Martin Gropius Bau (Berlin) from late September 2023 to January 2024 as one of the most comprehensive retrospectives of the collective's work. A comprehensive and expansive catalogue was published on the occasion, published by JRP Editions.

In 2022 as well, a focused retrospective of 250 of the Group's drawings, mostly done in New York, was exhibited at the Drawing Center, New York. The New Yorker reviewed it, saying, "The show has a deceptively playful air: the spectre of the AIDS epidemic is ever present."

== Legacy ==
General Idea is widely recognized as a leading part of a branch of a conceptual art movement that embraced the expression of ideas in multiple media. They were instrumental in the creation and elaboration of Canadian artist-run culture. They are represented in the permanent collections of numerous museums, including the National Gallery of Canada, the Museum of Modern Art (New York), the Stedelijk Museum (Amsterdam). The estate of General Idea is represented by the Esther Schipper Gallery, Berlin, Maureen Paley, London, Galerie MAI 36, Zurich and Mitchell-Innes & Nash, New York.

The General Idea archives is currently housed by the Library of the National Gallery of Canada, on long-term loan.

General Idea appears in Derek May's 1981 documentary film on the Toronto art scene, Off the Wall.

In 2003 a catalogue of their editions and multiples was published on the occasion of an exhibition curated by Fern Bayer. She also edited the publication.

In 2022, the reading room of the Library and Archives of the National Gallery of Canada was renamed the General Idea Reading Room. The General Idea Fellowship, a stipendium-based research fellowship, was established in May 2022.

== See also ==
- FILE Megazine
- Eye' Magazine'
- List of Eye magazine issues
