= Vancouver House =

Neo-futurist residential skyscraper in Vancouver, British Columbia

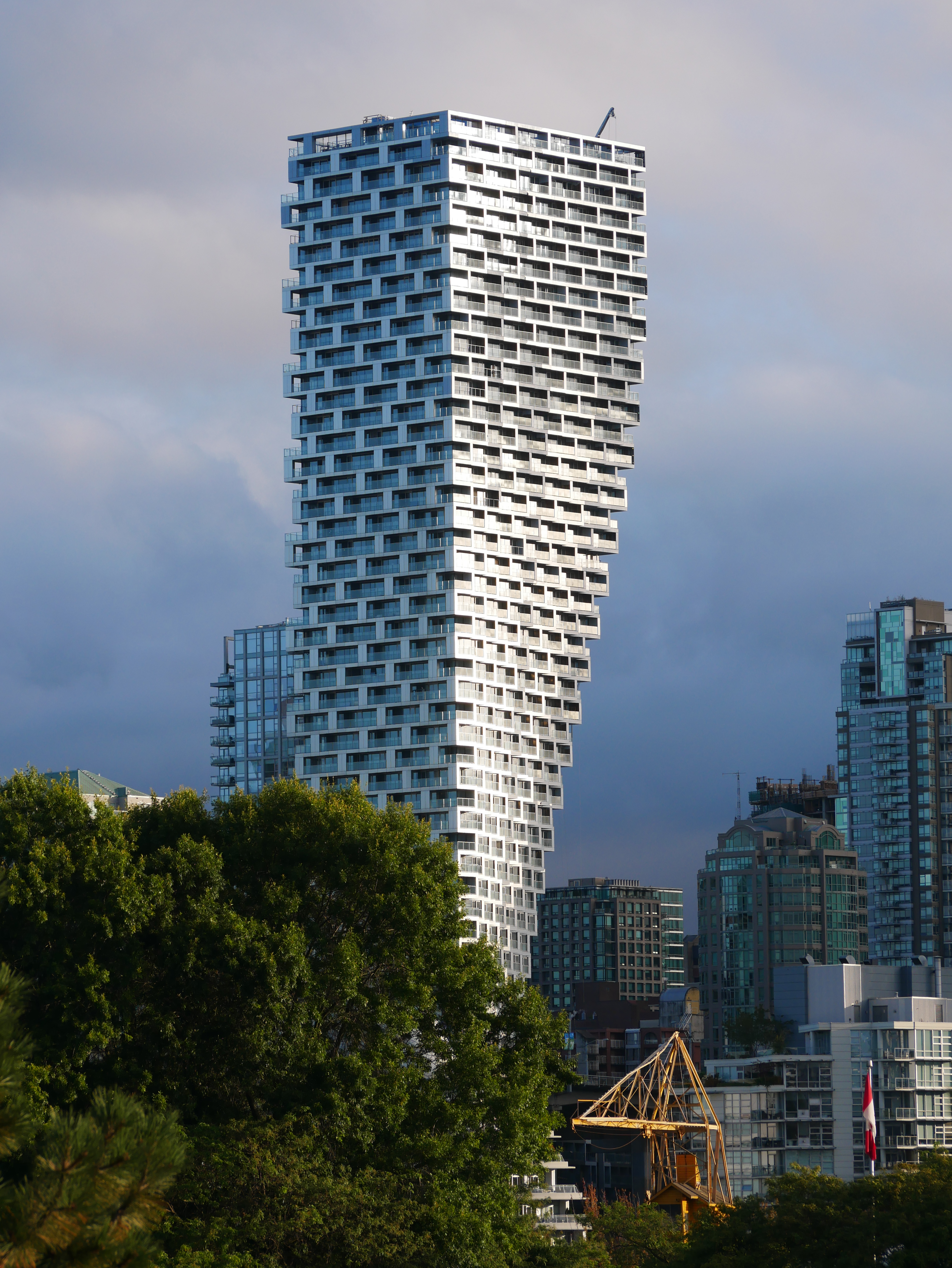
- Interactive map of the Vancouver House area

General information
- Status: Completed
- Type: Residential, retail
- Architectural style: Neo-futurist / Structural Expressionism
- Location: 1480 Howe Street; Vancouver, British Columbia; V6Z 2K8
- Coordinates: 49°16′30.2″N 123°07′51.2″W
- Construction started: 2016
- Completed: 2020

Height
- Architectural: 150.3 m (493 ft)

Technical details
- Material: Concrete
- Floor count: 49
- Floor area: 60,670 square metres (653,046 sq ft)

Design and construction
- Architect: Bjarke Ingels Group
- Developer: Westbank Projects Corporation
- Main contractor: ICON Pacific Construction Corp.

Website
- westbankcorp.com/body-of-work/vancouver-house

Vancouver House is a neo-futurist residential skyscraper in Vancouver, British Columbia, Canada. Construction of the skyscraper began in 2016 and was expected to be finished by the end of 2019, but completion was postponed to summer of 2020.

On April 15, 2021, a water pipe on the 29th floor burst and damaged 17 units as well as several elevators.

== Design ==
Vancouver House was designed by Danish architect Bjarke Ingels and structural engineers Buro Happold and Glotman Simpson. The design is based on a triangle that rises from the ground and gradually transitions into a rectangle as it ascends to the top. The design reflects the constraints of developing the triangular-shaped plot of land immediately east of the Howe Street on-ramp of the Granville Street Bridge. The east and west facades of the building feature box-shaped balconies, giving the building's exterior a honeycomb texture.

Spinning Chandelier, a public art piece, was installed near the skyscraper as part of the city's rezoning requirement.

== See also ==
- List of tallest buildings in Vancouver
- List of tallest buildings in British Columbia
