= Spinning Chandelier =

Public artwork in Vancouver, Canada

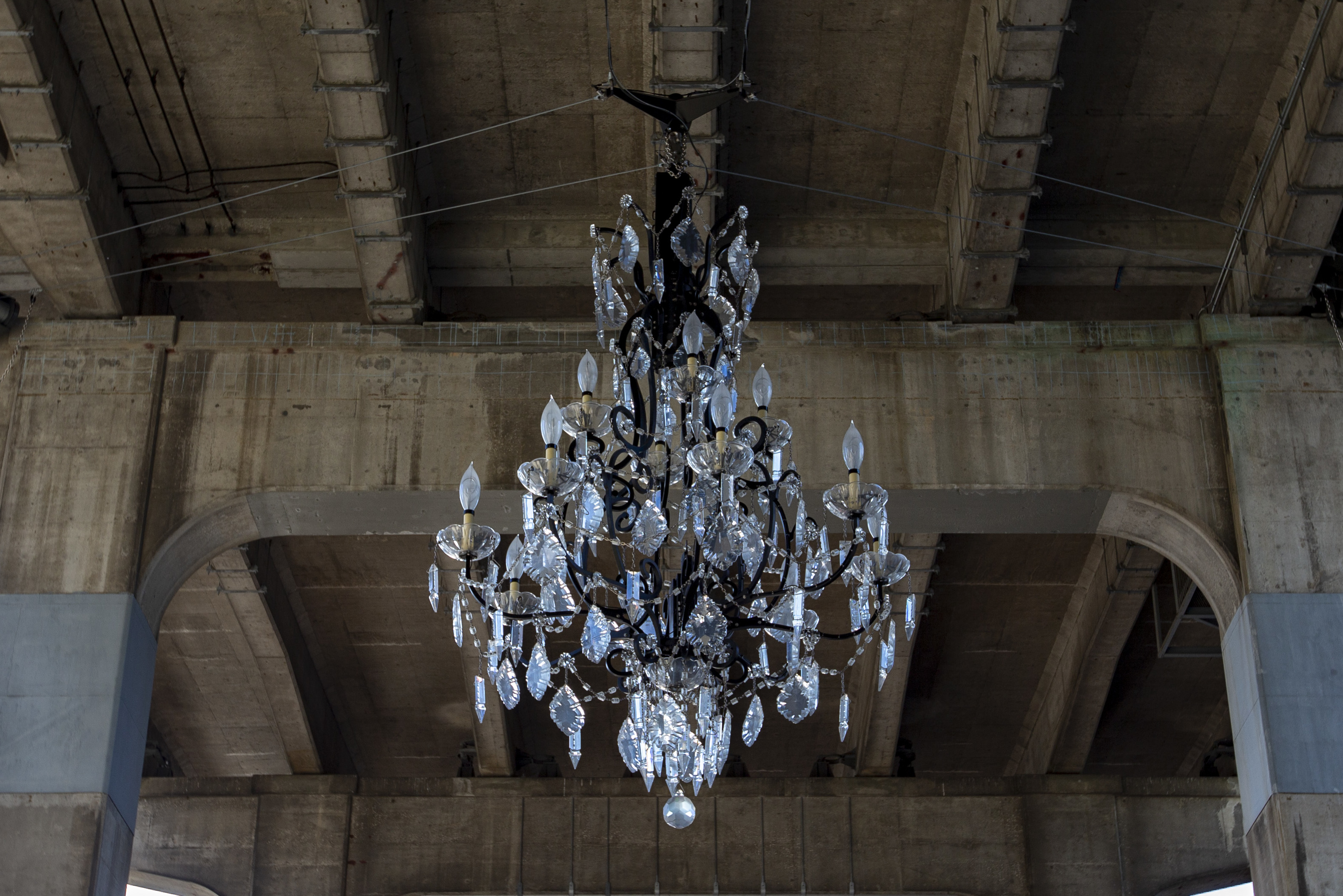
- Artist: Rodney Graham
- Year: 2019
- Medium: 600 polyurethane crystals, stainless steel, LED lights
- Dimensions: 7.8 m × 4.3 m (26 ft × 14 ft)
- Weight: 3,400 kg (7,500 lb)
- Location: Granville Street Bridge; Vancouver, B.C.
- 49.274122°N 123.130813°W

Spinning Chandelier is a public artwork by Rodney Graham in Vancouver, British Columbia, Canada. The work is situated under the Granville Street Bridge in Downtown Vancouver. It was unveiled in 2019.

== Attributes ==
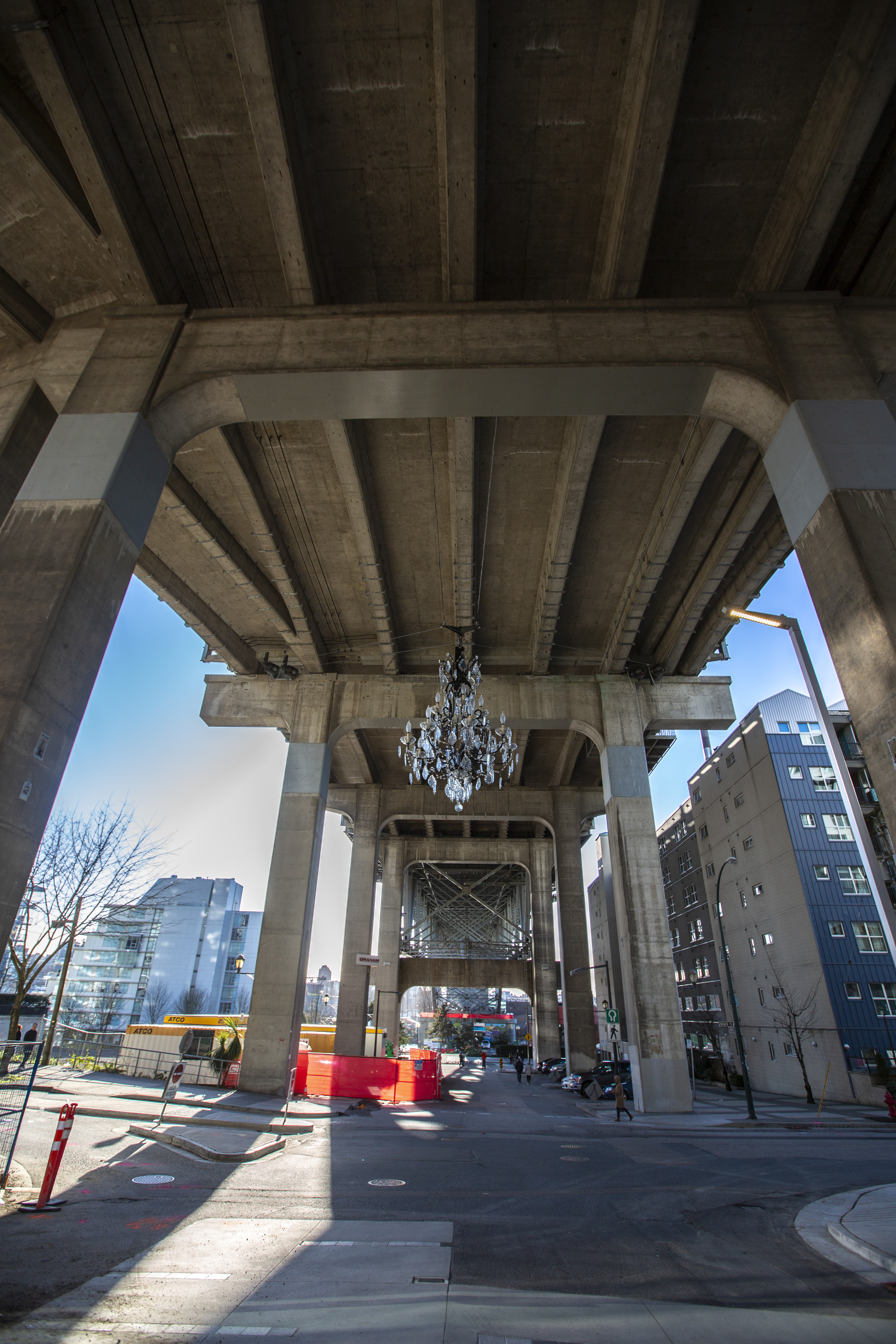
Location under the Granville Street Bridge

The work is located in a formerly underutilized space, hanging from beneath the Granville Street Bridge above the intersection of Beach Avenue and an unnamed alley. The work was designed by artist Rodney Graham. It is the public art component of Vancouver House, a 60-story condominium building designed by Bjarke Ingels.

The chandelier has a cyclical show that takes place three times a day, at 12 p.m., 4 p.m., and 9 p.m. The cycle involves the work lighting up, lowering to its lowest point, rotating for four minutes, slowing down, stopping, and rising back to its original place.

The chandelier is styled like those made in the 18th century. It weighs about 3,400 kg (7,500 lb) and measures 7.8 m × 4.3 m (26 ft × 14 ft). The work is made of stainless steel, LED lights, and 600 polyurethane crystals. It was manufactured by Walla Walla Foundry in the U.S. state of Washington.

The work was meant to "be in dialogue" with Vancouver House, a corresponding commission seen by the work's art consultant as another giant sculpture. The artist matched the chandelier with the bridge underside, which he viewed as an area with a large volume and a grand presence.

The budget for the artwork was initially $1.2 million, the minimum amount required for Westbank Corp. to invest, as it had rezoned a space of over 100,000 square feet (9,300 m^{2}). Due to its complex design and fabrication process, the final cost of the artwork rose to $4.8 million. The city waived Westbank Corp.'s requirement for public art in three other developments, as funds were pooled into the chandelier project.

The artwork was inspired by an earlier work of Graham, titled Torqued Chandelier Release. That work was inspired by an experiment by scientist Isaac Newton, involving a half-filled bucket of water suspended from an unwinding rope.

== History ==
A public unveiling ceremony was held on November 27, 2019.

== Reception ==
The public's response to the artwork has been mixed. Its $4.8 million cost and symbolic grandeur has been seen by local residents as excessive, especially in an area with a housing and homelessness crisis. Other local residents expressed positive views of its design, including its programmed cyclical motion.

== See also ==
- Public art in Vancouver
