= Shannon Oksanen =

Canadian artist, musician (born 1967)

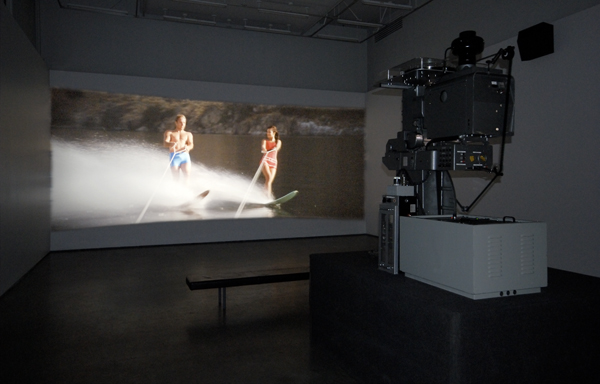
Shannon Oksanen's 2008 exhibit Summerland at the Contemporary Art Gallery (Vancouver), featuring a remake of the waterskiing scene from the 1965 film Viva Las Vegas, starring Elvis Presley and Ann-Margret.

Shannon Oksanen (born 1967) is a Canadian contemporary painter, video artist, sculptor, and musician. She is the former lead singer for the Vancouver band Volumizer. Oksanen lives and works in Vancouver and Tofino in British Columbia.

== Life and career ==
Shannon Oksanen was born in 1967, in Canada. She graduated in 1993, with a degree in art history from the University of British Columbia. Oksanen is self-taught at visual art. She was previously married to artist Rodney Graham.

=== Exhibitions ===
Her solo exhibitions include Or Gallery (2002), VTO Gallery, London (2004), Tracey Lawrence Gallery (2007), Contemporary Art Gallery (2008), and Union Gallery, London, UK (2011). Notable group exhibitions include at the Vancouver Art Gallery (2001), the Wattis Institute for Contemporary Arts, San Francisco (2003), 303 Gallery, New York (2005), and Unit/Pitt Gallery (2011).

=== Musical work ===
Oksanen was the singer for the buzz-saw punk rock band Volumizer. Other band members included Bill Napier-Hemy, Rodney Graham, and Jade Blade.
