= Aerodynamic Forms in Space =

Sculpture by Rodney Graham in Vancouver, British Columbia, Canada

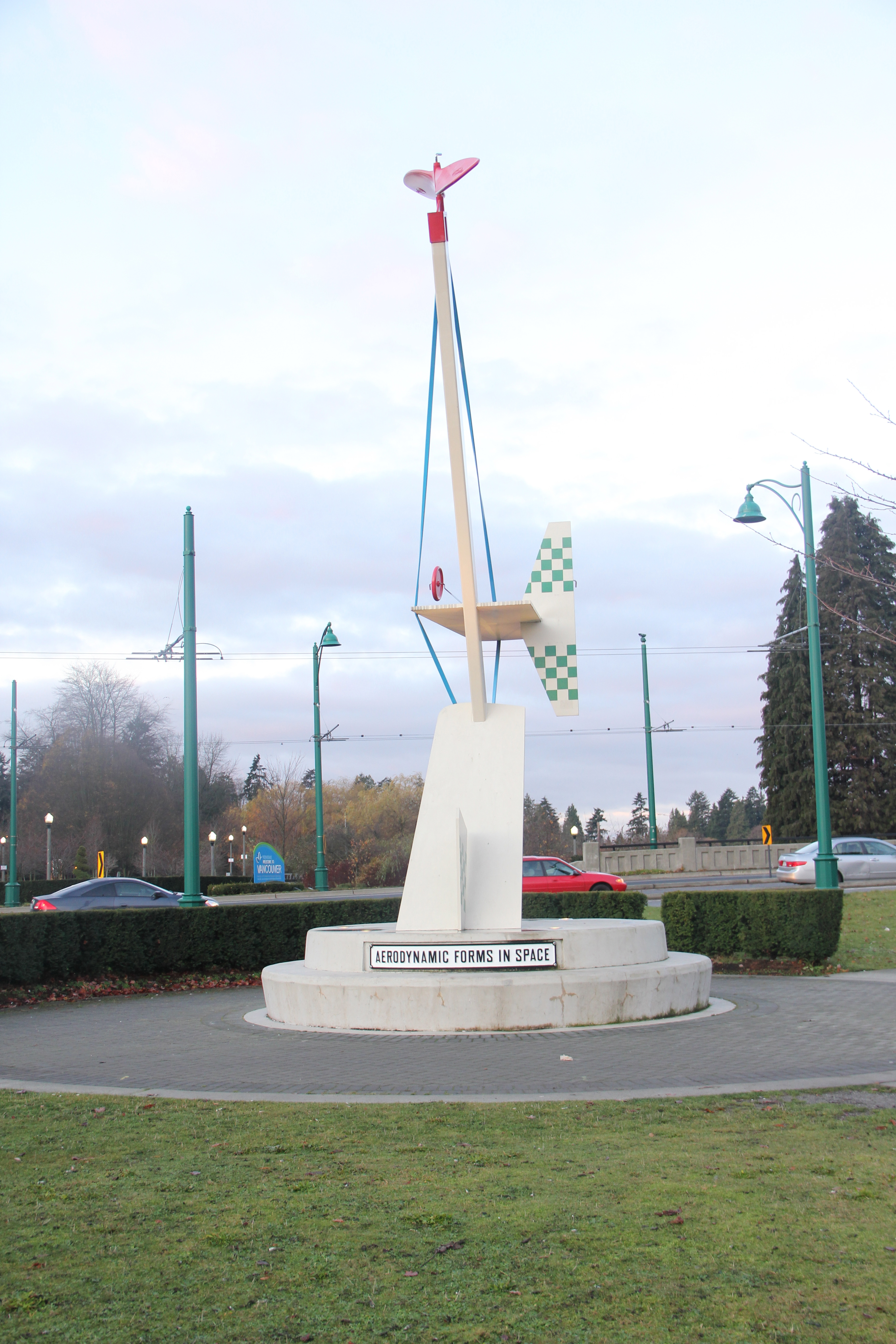
- Aerodynamic Forms in Space in 2011
- Artist: Rodney Graham
- Year: 2010
- Location: Vancouver, British Columbia, Canada; 49°17′41″N 123°08′11″W

Aerodynamic Forms in Space is a 2010 sculpture by Rodney Graham located at the Georgia Street entrance to Stanley Park in Vancouver, Canada. The work was commissioned by the City of Vancouver for the 2010 Winter Olympics. The inspiration for the sculpture was photos Graham took in 1977 of misassembled toy glider parts. The sculpture depicts airplane parts abstractly placed and painted to look like balsa wood.

== History ==
The sculpture was created by Rodney Graham. It was commissioned for the Olympic and Paralympic Public Art Program as part of the 2010 Winter Olympics by the City of Vancouver.

In creating this piece, Graham wanted to explore modernism's history. He was inspired by toy glider parts he misassembled in 1977, then photographed. The name of the sculpture comes from the name of the exhibit of this series of photographs. In creating this sculpture, Graham rearranged pieces from three airplane model sets. He wanted the sculpture to resemble a work by Anthony Caro.

Construction crews started preparing the site for the sculpture in December 2009. The sculpture was installed on its site in January 2010.

== Description ==
The sculpture abstractly depicts a blue elastic band, a plastic, red propeller that is turned by the wind, and wheels that move up and down in a short distance. Parts resembling an airplane wing, fuselage and tail are painted to resemble balsa wood. The base of the sculpture looks like a structure that a model airplane would be placed on. A plaque with the sculpture's name, resembling a sticker, is placed on the base. It is 35 ft (11 m) tall and mostly made of stainless steel.

The sculpture is located at the Georgia Street entrance at the northeast side of Stanley Park. The site was previously used as a planter.

The sculpture makes reference to El Lissitzky's artistic style of Proun and Caro's metal sculptures.

This was the third permanent sculpture that Graham has created for the city of Vancouver.

== Reception ==
Patrik Andersson, associate professor at Emily Carr University of Art and Design, praised the work for interpreting utopian traditions with pop culture references. Sarah Milroy, writing for The Globe and Mail, called the sculpture "serious fun". Kevin Griffin with the Vancouver Sun said the sculpture has recognisable parts from an airplane modelling set, but that it "resembles a model airplane sent through a malfunctioning transporter from Star Trek."

== See also ==
- 2010 in art
