= Rodney Graham =

Canadian artist and musician (1949–2022)

Rodney Graham OC
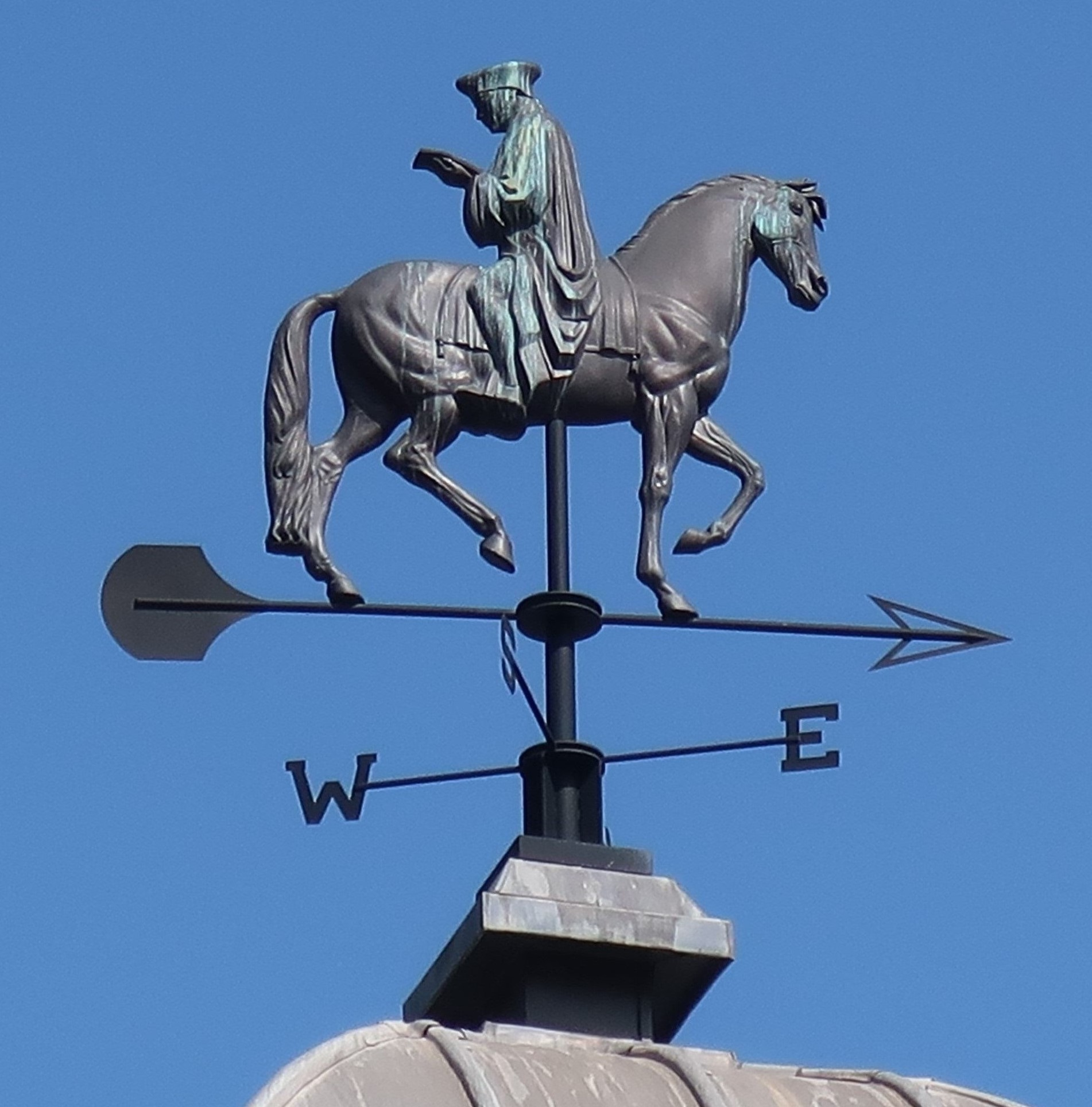
- Weather vane by Graham on the Whitechapel Gallery, London (2008). It depicts the artist in the guise of 16th-century humanist scholar Desiderius Erasmus.
- Born: William Rodney Graham; January 16, 1949; Abbotsford, British Columbia, Canada
- Died: October 22, 2022 (aged 73); Vancouver, British Columbia, Canada
- Education: University of British Columbia, Vancouver
- Known for: Filmmaker; video artist; photographer; painter; graphic artist; sculptor; installation artist
- Notable work: Vexation Island (1997)
- Movement: Vancouver School

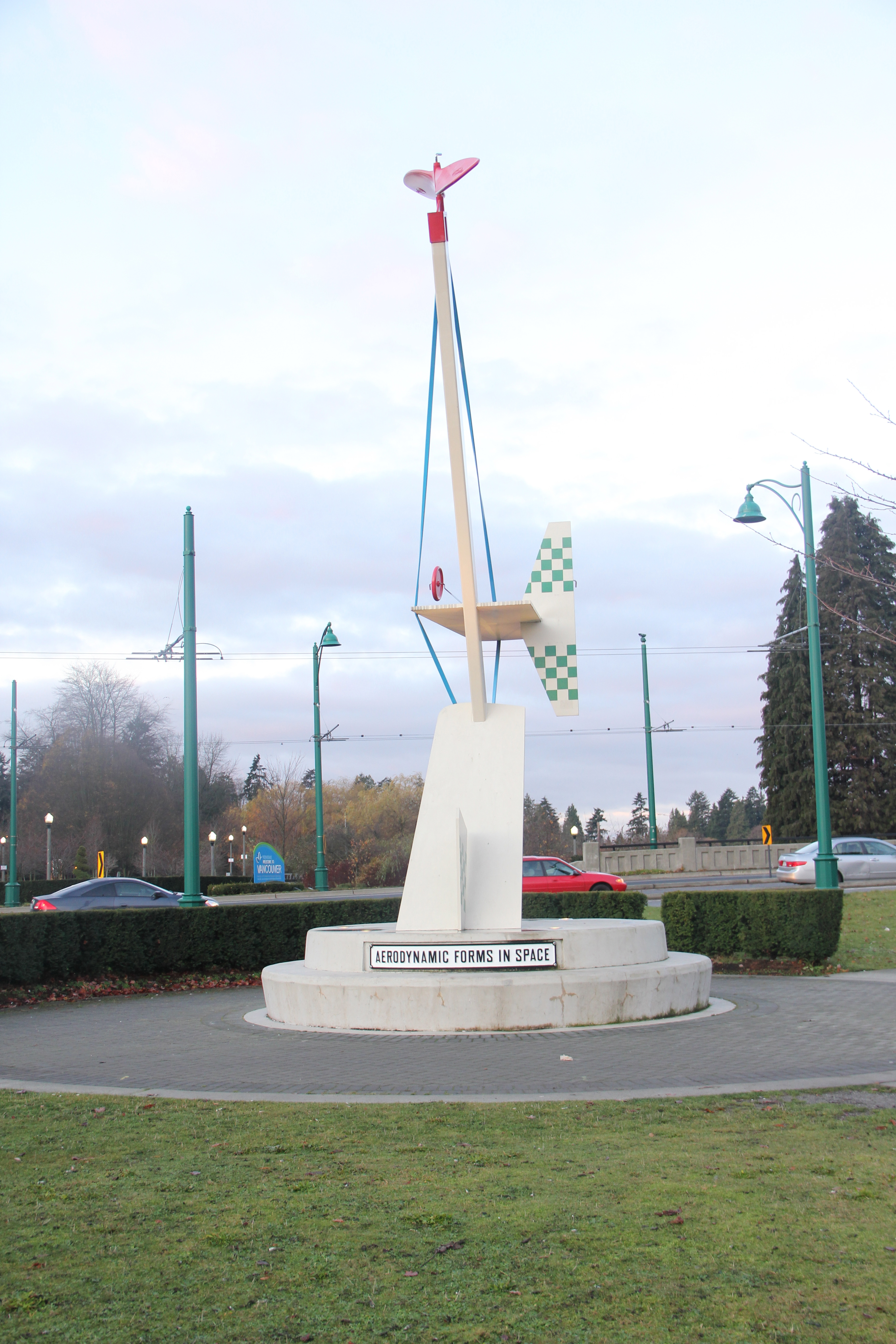
Stanley Park, Vancouver, British Columbia – Aerodynamic Forms in Space by Rodney Graham

William Rodney Graham OC (January 16, 1949 – October 22, 2022) was a Canadian visual artist and musician. He was closely associated with the Vancouver School.

== Early life ==
Graham was born in Abbotsford, British Columbia, on January 16, 1949. He studied art history at the University of British Columbia and subsequently went to Simon Fraser University (SFU). He intended to concentrate on writing and literature before taking a modern art course taught by Ian Wallace at SFU.

== Work ==
Coming out of Vancouver's 1970s photoconceptual tradition, Graham's work is often informed by historical literary, musical, philosophical, and popular references. He was most often associated with other west coast Canadian artists, including Vikky Alexander, Jeff Wall, Stan Douglas, Roy Arden, and Ken Lum. During the late 1970s, he played electric guitar in the band UJ3RK5 with fellow visual artists Wall on keyboards and Ian Wallace on electric bass, among others. His wide-ranging and often genre-busting work frequently engaged with technologies of the past: literary, psychological, and musical texts, optical devices, and film as a historical medium.

Among his earliest works is Camera Obscura (1979; destroyed 1981) a site-specific work that consisted of a shed-sized optical device on his family's farm field near Abbotsford, British Columbia. Entering the shed, the observer was confronted with an inverted image of a solitary tree. Both prior to this (with Rome Ruins [1978]) and throughout the 1980s and 1990s, Graham employed the technique of the camera obscura in his work.

Beginning in the early 1980s, Graham took found texts as the basis for his bookworks – at once conceptual and material – inserting bookmarks with additional pages, inserting textual loops, or incorporating books into optical devices in works such as Dr. No* (1991), Lenz (1983), and Reading Machine for Lenz (1993) respectively. Many of these were carried out with the esteemed Belgian publisher Yves Gevaert and gallerist Christine Burgin. His extensive body of work related to Sigmund Freud (beginning in 1983) developed out of this text-based practice, though, later, found object books would be integrated unmodified into Donald Judd-like sculptures, for example The Basic Writings of Sigmund Freud (1987).

Until 1997, when he represented Canada at the Venice Biennale with the film loop Vexation Island, Graham was most well known for his series of photographs of Welsh oaks seen upside-down. For this project, he employed a photographer to take black and white negatives of majestic, isolated trees in the English countryside with a large-format camera. He then hung the pictures upside down, like camera obscura images. In 1998, Graham produced his definitive work on this theme, a series of seven monumental images of Welsh oaks printed on color paper to produce warm deep sepia and charcoal hues.

A postage stamp depicting Graham's photograph, Basement Camera Shop circa 1937 was issued on March 22, 2013, by Canada Post as part of their Canadian Photography series. The image is a recreation of a snapshot discovered by the artist at an antique store. Graham placed himself in the photograph as the owner standing at the counter, waiting for a customer.

=== Film ===
In 1994, Graham began a series of films and videos in which he himself appears as the principal character: Halcion Sleep (1994), Vexation Island (1997) (shown at Canadian pavilion of the 1997 Venice Biennale), How I Became a Ramblin' Man (1999), and The Phonokinetoscope (2002). In The Phonokinetoscope Graham's engagement with the origins of cinema and its eventual demise surface. In this work, Graham takes up a prototype by Thomas Edison and puts forward an argument for the relation between sound and image in film.

In Vexation Island (1997), a shipwrecked sailor, played by Graham, wakes up on a tropical island only to be knocked unconscious by a falling coconut that he has succeeded in shaking out of a palm tree; after a while he reawakens, returns to the tree and the cycle repeats. Later, in Rheinmetall/Victoria 8 (2003), two increasingly obsolete technologies, the typewriter and film projector, face off against one another—with the latter projecting a film of the former.

The film Lobbing Potatoes at a Gong (1969) (2006), shot on 16mm and presented as a looped projection, fictitiously documents a 1969 performance strongly reminiscent of the Fluxus movement. The artist, played by Graham, is shown sitting on a chair in the setting of an alternative cultural institution, with an audience watching him trying to hit a gong with potatoes. All the potatoes that actually hit the gong were subsequently used to produce vodka in a small still. The bottle is displayed in a showcase, both as an end product and part of the work. As in many of Graham's films, the relatively simple plot is in stark contrast to the effort that went into the production, with the artist conducting extensive research and hiring a professional film crew.

=== Drawing and painting ===
In 2003, Graham turned to drawing and painting for the first time. Adopting a persona in a host of related photographic, installation, and painted works, The Gifted Amateur, November 10, 1962, 2007, indicates both continuing performative and art historical directions in his work.

Graham exhibited a series of film installations with Harun Farocki in 2009, titled "HF/RG," at the Jeu de Paume, Paris.

== Exhibitions ==
Graham's solo exhibitions include the Vancouver Art Gallery (2012); a retrospective at MACBA, Barcelona (2010), travelling to Hamburger Kunsthalle and the Museum für Gegenwartskunst, Basel; Museum of Contemporary Art, Los Angeles (2004); Institute of Contemporary Art, Philadelphia (2005), Whitechapel Gallery, London (2002), and Hamburger Bahnhof Berlin (2001). The artist was included in documenta IX (1992), the Venice Biennale in 1997, the Whitney Biennial in 2006, and the Carnegie International in 2013.

== Recognition ==
Graham represented Canada at the 47th Venice Biennale (1997) and among awards he has received the Gershon Iskowitz Prize, Toronto (2004), the Kurt Schwitters-Preis, Niedersächsische Sparkassenstiftung, Germany (2006), and the Audain Prize for lifetime achievement in visual arts, British Columbia (2011). He was short-listed for the Scotia Bank Award in 2014. In 2016, he was appointed an Officer of the Order of Canada for his contributions to Canadian contemporary visual arts.

== Personal life ==
Graham lived in Vancouver and had been married to the artist Shannon Oksanen. Though they had not divorced, she lived separately with her two children and their father. Together they owned Liberty Bakery in Vancouver.

Graham died on October 22, 2022, in Vancouver. He was 73, and suffered from cancer in the year prior to his death.

== See also ==
- Aerodynamic Forms in Space
- Spinning Chandelier
