= Granville Street Bridge =

Bridge in Vancouver, British Columbia, Canada

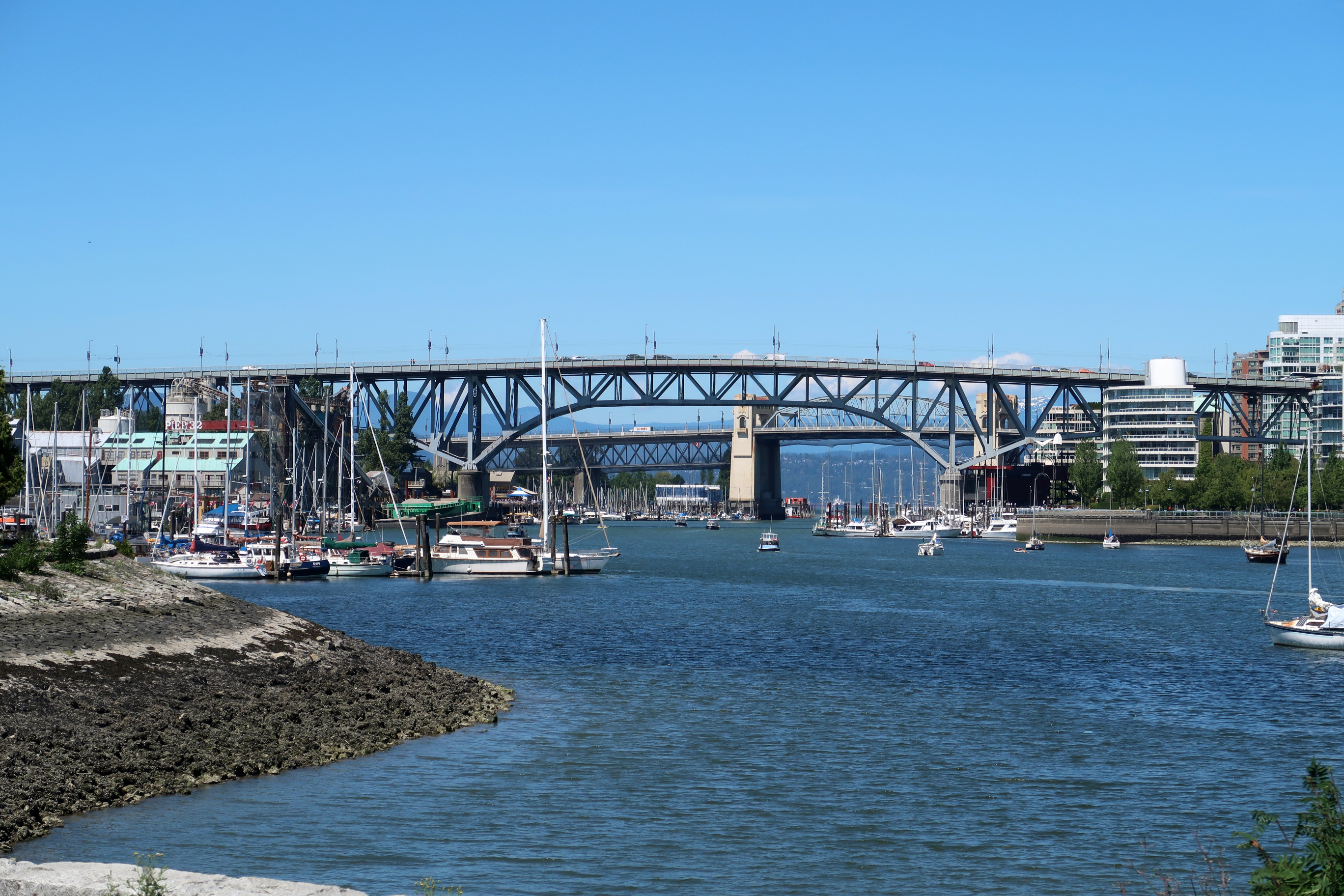
- The modern Granville Street Bridge
- Coordinates: 49.272551°N 123.133049°W
- Carries: Eight lanes of British Columbia Highway 99, Granville Street, pedestrians, and bicycles
- Crosses: False Creek
- Locale: Vancouver
- Maintained by: City of Vancouver
- Preceded by: Granville Street Bridge (second)

Characteristics
- Design: Cantilever/truss bridge
- Total length: 1,171 m (0.73 mi)
- Clearance below: 27.4 m (90 ft)

History
- Opened: February 4, 1954

Statistics
- Daily traffic: 65,000

Location
- Interactive map of Granville Street Bridge

The Granville Street Bridge or Granville Bridge is an eight-lane fixed cantilever/truss bridge in Vancouver, British Columbia, Canada, carrying Granville Street between Downtown Vancouver southwest and the Fairview neighborhood. It spans False Creek and is 27.4 m (90 ft) above Granville Island. The bridge is part of Highway 99.

== History ==
=== First bridge (1889) ===
The first Granville Bridge opened in 1889, crossing from Beach Ave to 3rd Ave and was part of the scheme to clear Granville Street through to the North Arm of the Fraser River, where a bridge crossed to the farming community of Eburne. Granville Street was called Centre Street south of False Creek (until 1907) and the new slit through the forest heading south was initially known as North Arm Road. The 2,400-metre (7,900 ft) long, low timber trestle bridge opened on January 4, costing $16,000 to build, and was designed by the Canadian Pacific Railway (CPR). It had a swing span near the downtown side, was wide enough for two wagons, had a 4-foot (1.2 m) wide separated path on the west side for pedestrians, and was barely above high tide – children swam from it in the summer.

Two years after it was built, the CPR cleared the Fairview Slopes and opened them for settlement; the street railway company (predecessor of the BC Electric) ran a single-track on a trestle on the east side of the bridge for the "Fairview Belt Line" which connected Granville Street, 9th Avenue (now Broadway) and Main Street with downtown, hoping it would help spur development, which it did.

=== Second bridge (1909) ===
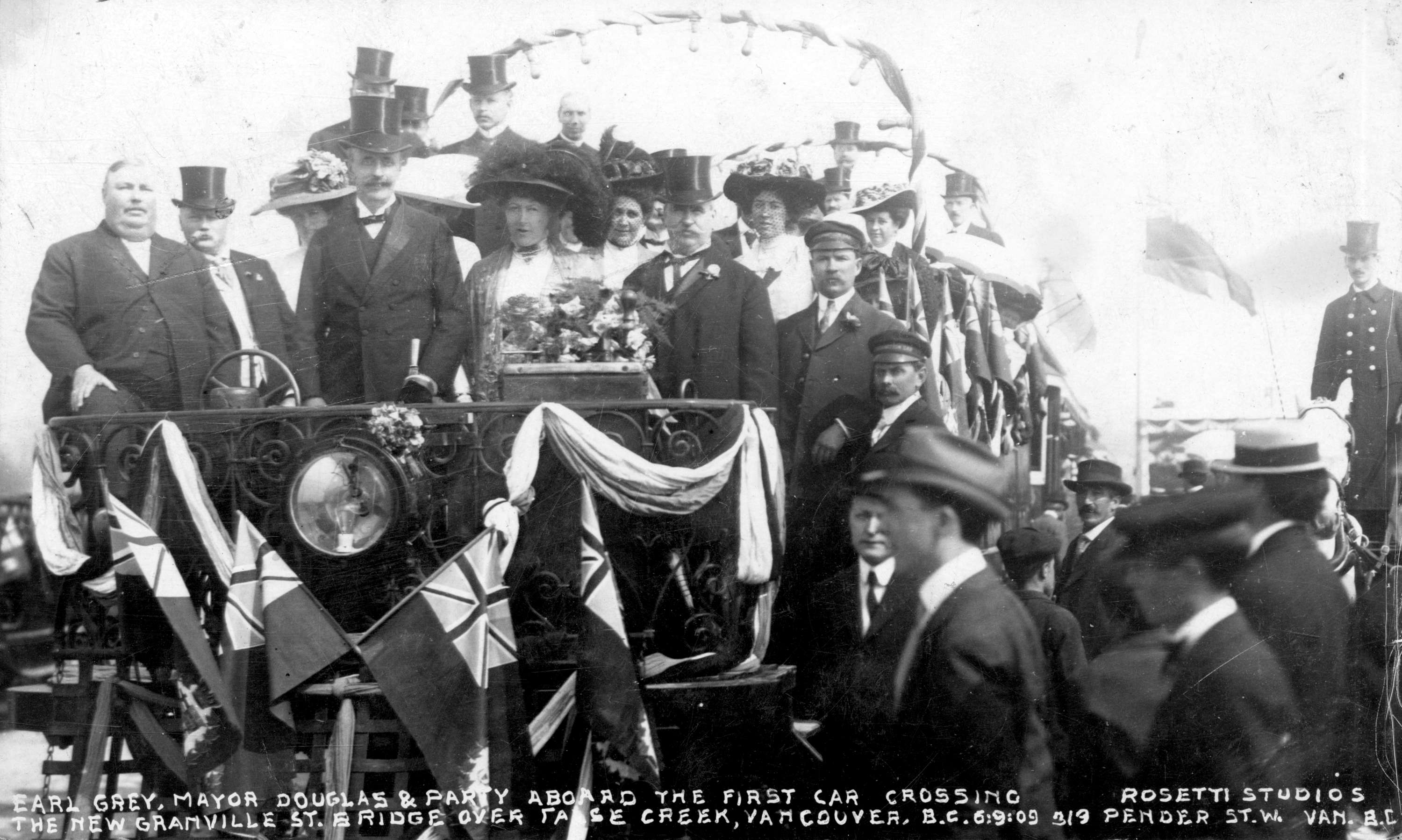
Governor General Earl Grey (centre) and Vancouver mayor Charles Douglas (on Lady Grey's left) at the opening of the new Granville Street Bridge, Vancouver, 6 September 1909

The second bridge was completed in 1909. It was a longer, medium-level steel bridge with a through truss swing span. During World War I, on April 29, 1915, a fire broke out on the bridge that was thought to be an arson attack. Four Germans were arrested.

=== Third bridge (1954) ===
On February 4, 1954, the current Granville Street Bridge opened to traffic after five years of planning and construction; its dedication ceremony was attended by 5,000 spectators after it had been delayed a week due to heavy snow. The Vancouver Sun arranged for the first driver across the 1909 bridge, Sidney Annoot, to repeat her feat in 1954. The city government self-funded the bridge project, which cost $16.5 million (equivalent to $192 million in 2025 dollars), with "no formal assistance given by any other government body" according to mayor Frederick Hume. A million vehicles crossed over the bridge in its first month.

The eight-lane structure was constructed from 1951 to 1954 on the same alignment as the first bridge. Steel plate girders salvaged from the second bridge were made into barges for constructing the foundations of the Oak Street Bridge. Initially only four lanes were open to traffic until the completion of the loop ramps on the north side on July 16. The bridge's wide design was meant to accommodate a future freeway that would serve downtown; those plans were cancelled in the 1960s.

Recent improvements to the bridge include increasing its earthquake resistance, and installing higher curbs and median barriers.

=== 21st century ===
In December 2017, Vancouver City Council approved a plan to remove the "Granville Loops" – a pair of cloverleaf off-ramps connecting the bridge with Pacific Street – and open up the land to redevelopment.

The Granville Street Bridge underwent a seismic retrofit that began in late 2018 and was completed in September 2021.

In January 2019, Vancouver City Council announced a plan to improve pedestrian and cyclist access to the bridge from the surrounding neighborhoods by converting two of the eight vehicle lanes into separated bike lanes. The plan was opened up for public comment in April 2019 with the project approved. Construction on the pedestrian and bicycle lanes began in February 2023 and was completed in July 2025.

== Gallery ==
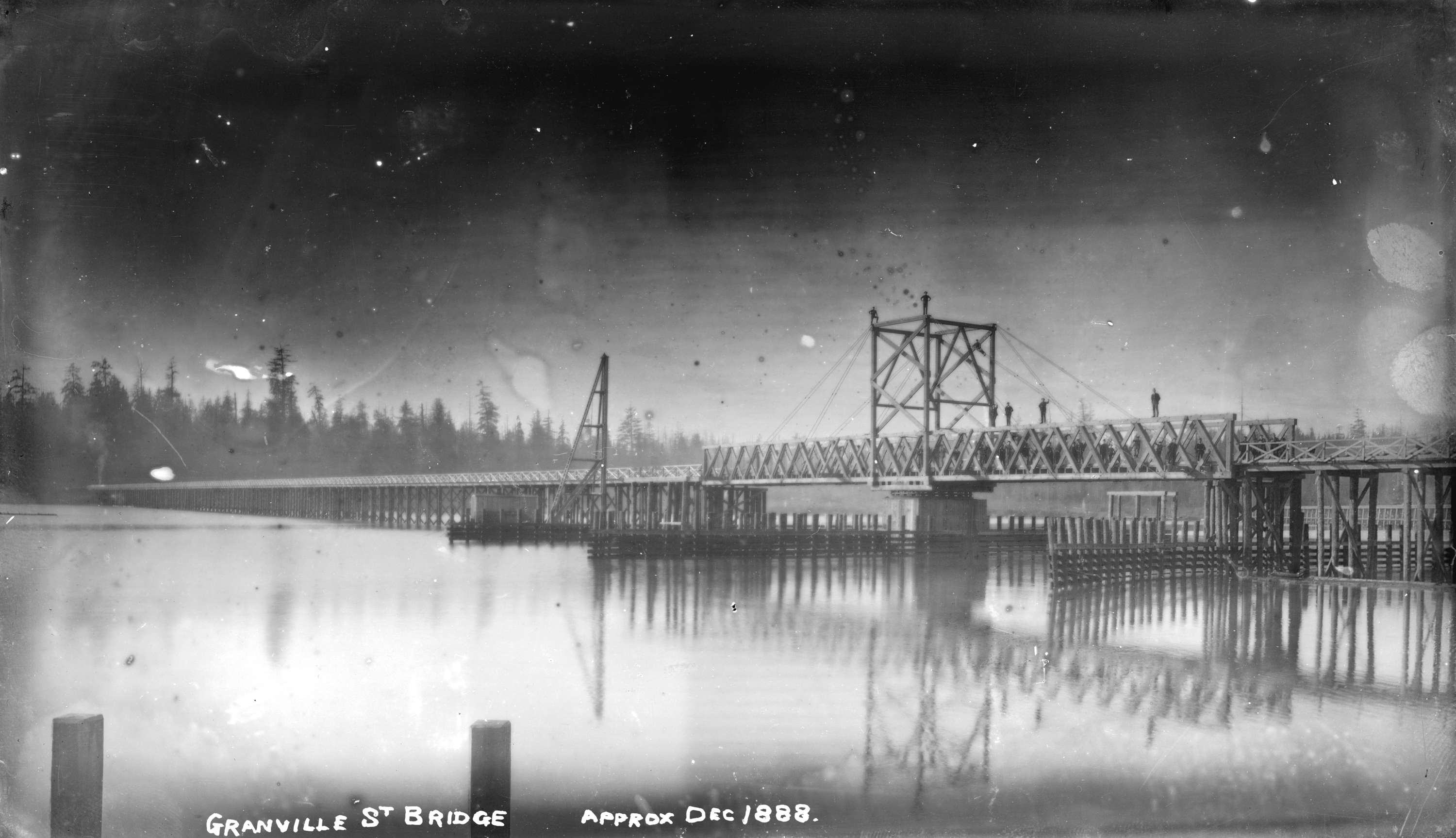
Original bridge in 1888

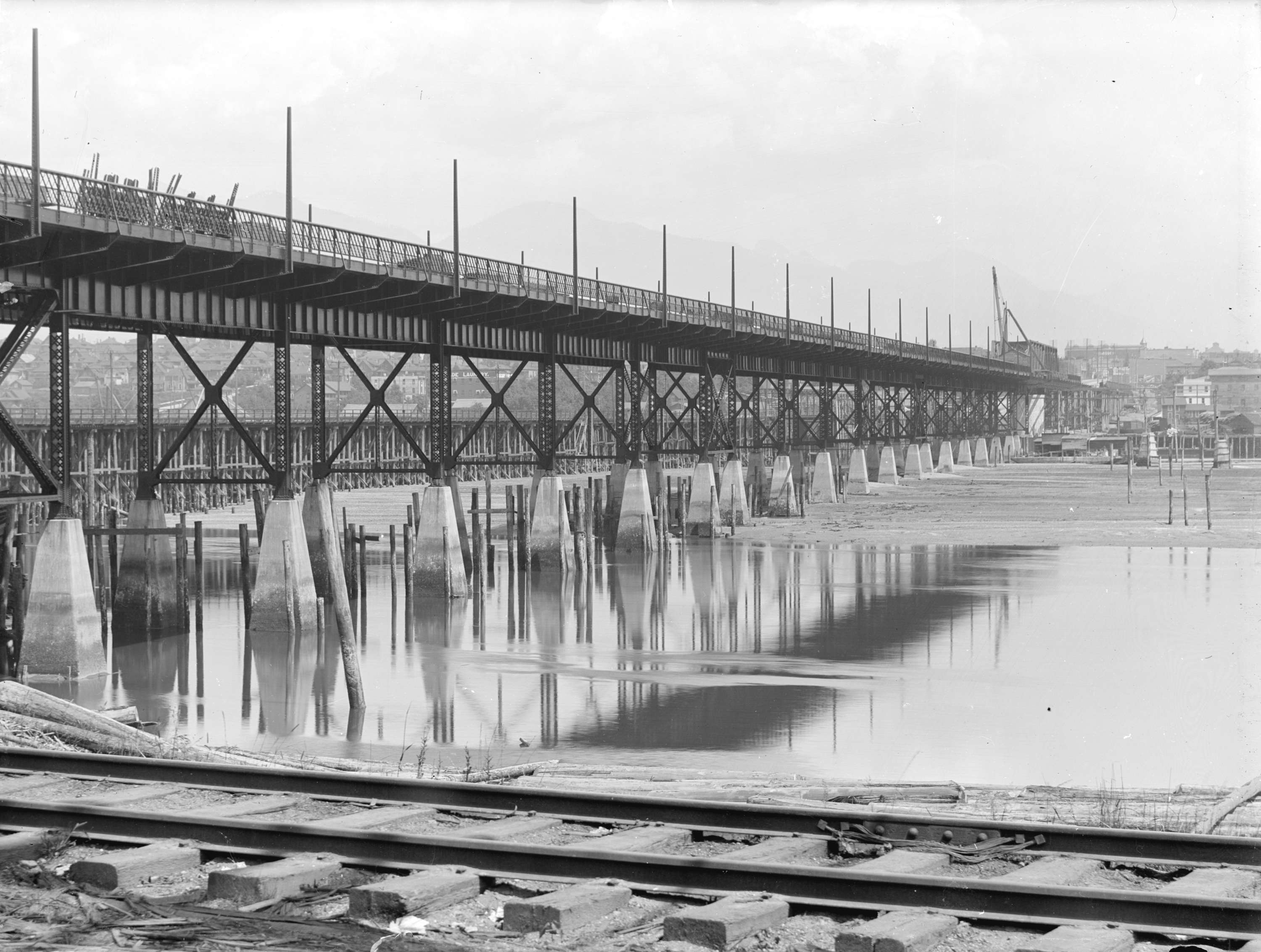
Second bridge under construction, c. 1908

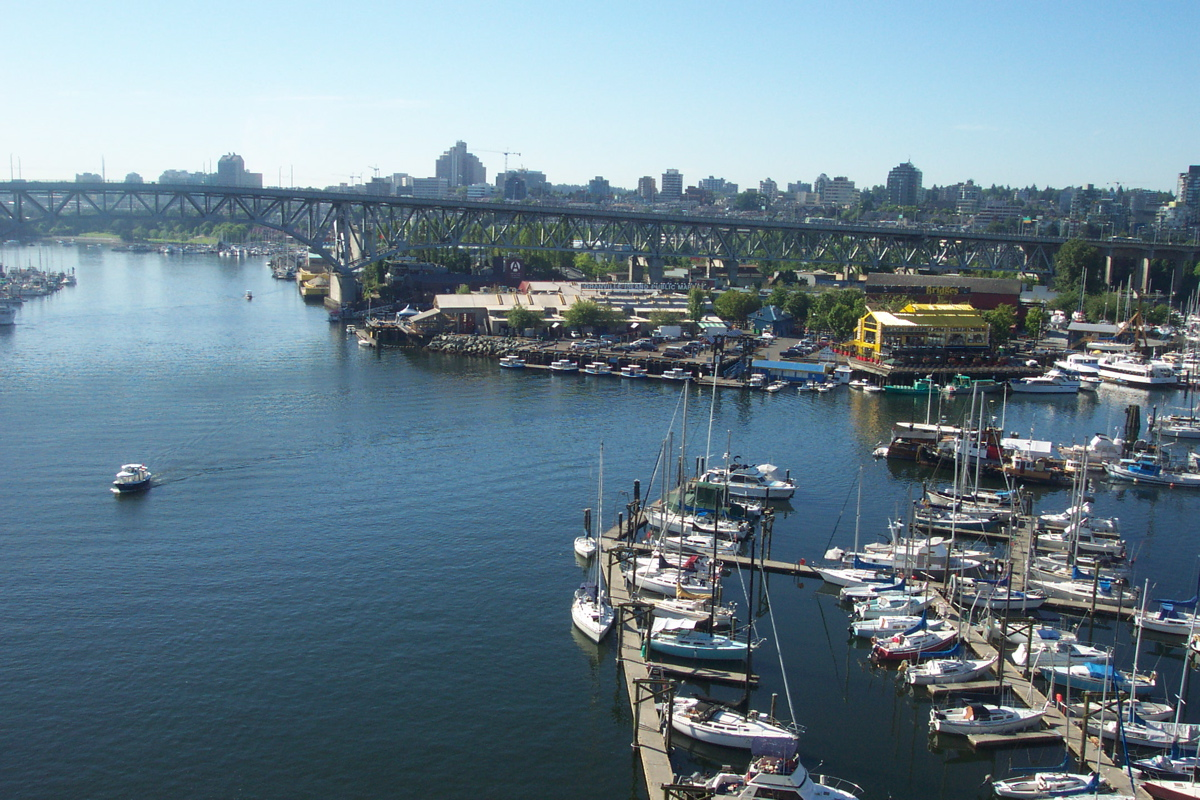
Granville Street Bridge from the Burrard Street Bridge

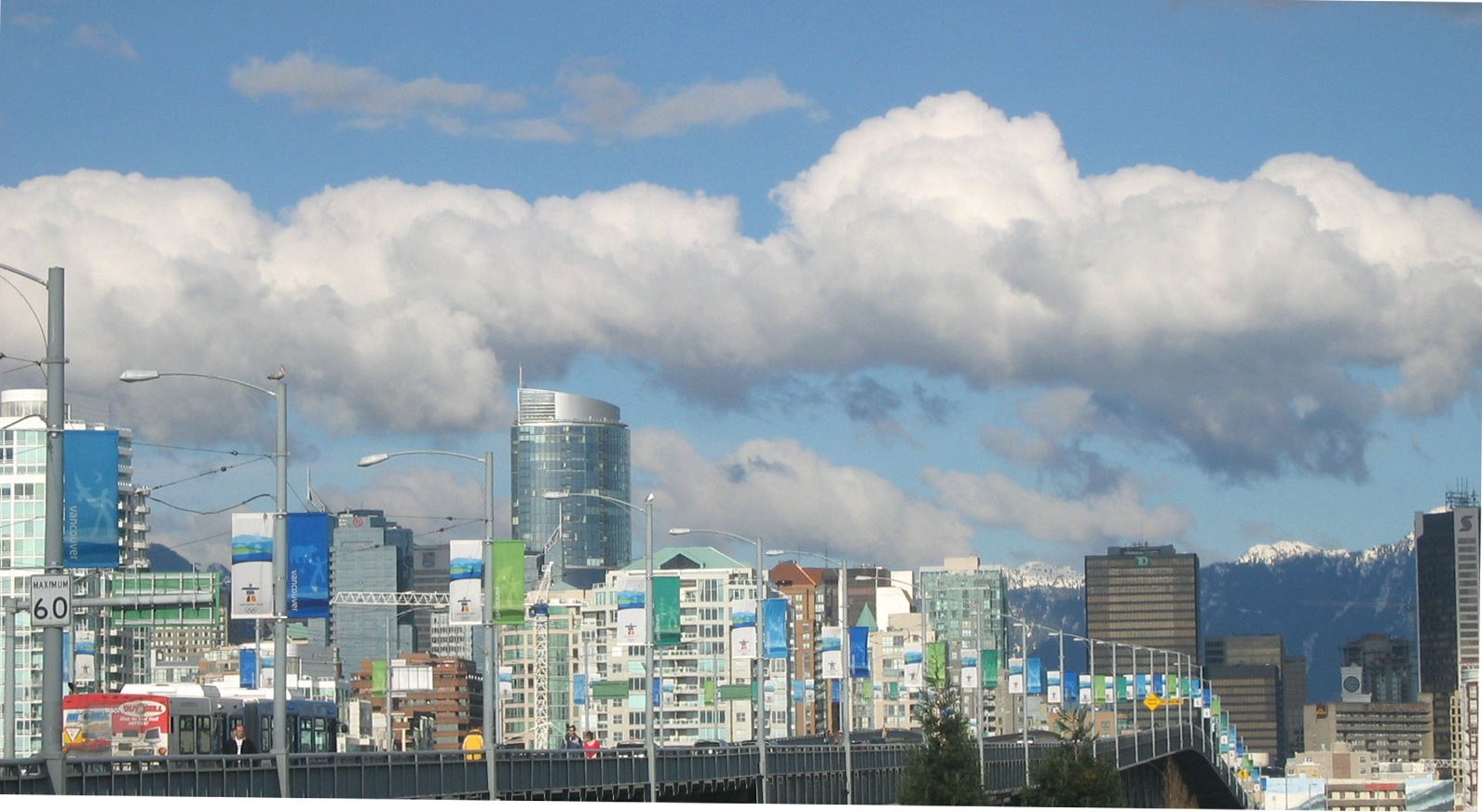
Southwest view along Bridge into city centre, Q4 2006

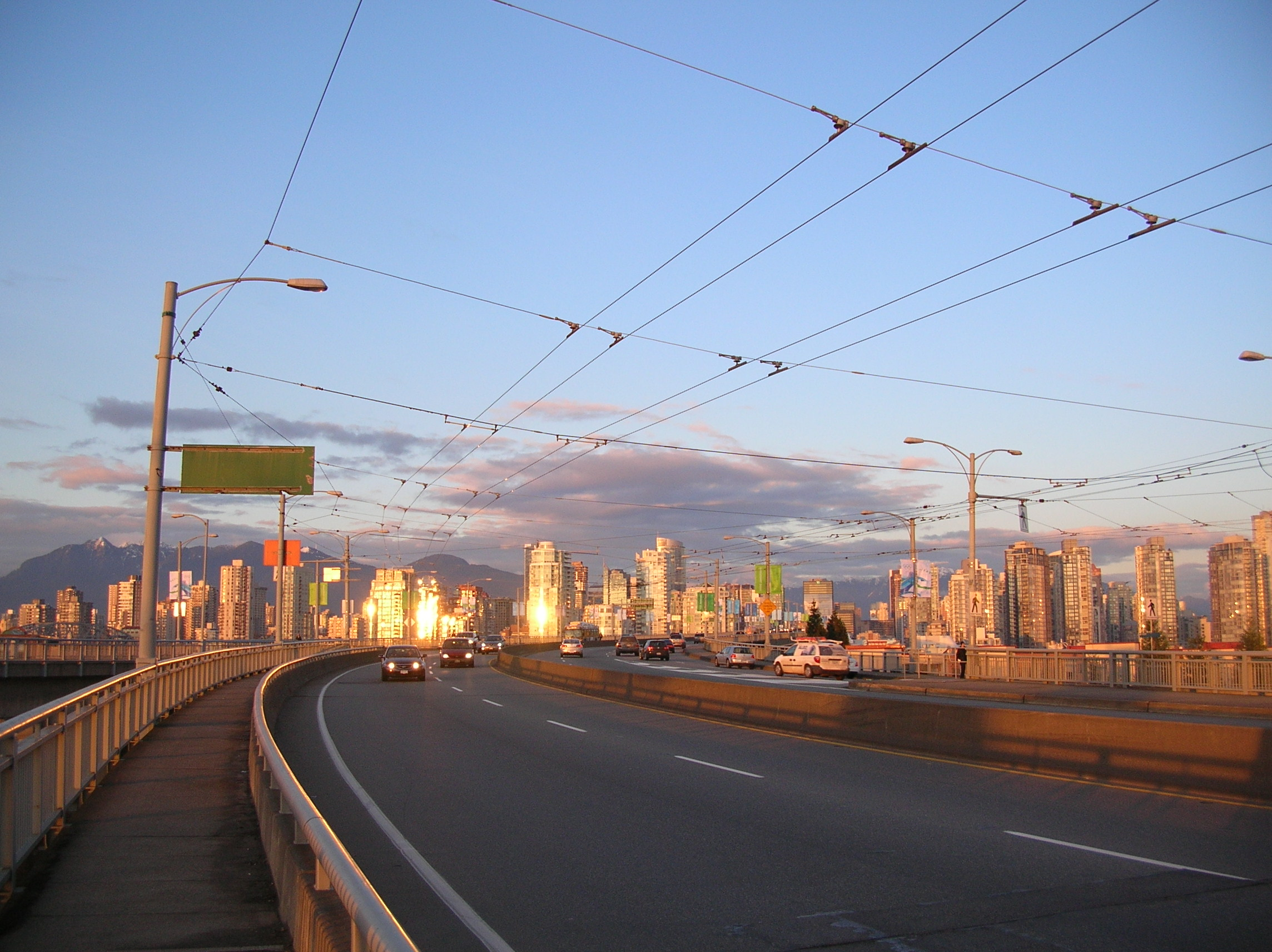
View of downtown

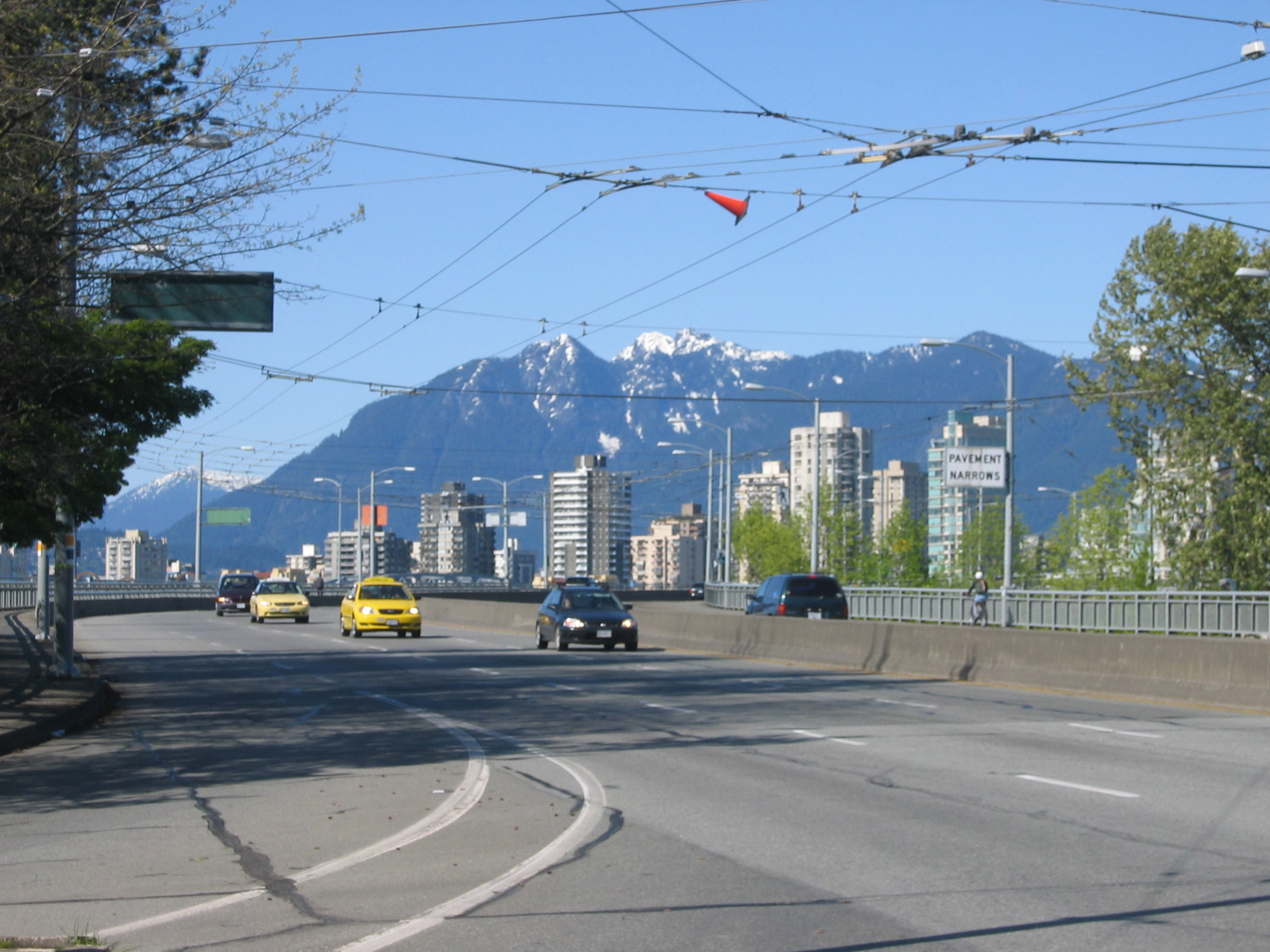
The modern Granville Street Bridge, with downtown and the North Shore mountains in the distance

== See also ==
- List of bridges in Canada
- Spinning Chandelier

== Resources ==
- History of Metropolitan Vancouver
- Bridges of Greater Vancouver
- Granville Street Bridge at Structurae
