= List of Canadian women artists =

This is a partial list of women artists who were born in Canada or whose artworks are closely associated with that country.

== A ==
- Andréanne Abbondanza-Bergeron, installation art
- Kirsten Abrahamson (born 1960), ceramist
- Una Stella Abrahamson (1922–1999), artist, writer
- KC Adams (born 1971), multimedia art
- Marilla Adams (1864–1966)
- Catherine Addai (fl 2019), Ghanaian-Canadian fashion designer
- Amelia Alcock-White (born 1981), painting
- Lady Eveline Marie Alexander (1821–1906), painter
- Vikky Alexander (born 1959), photography, video art
- Wilhelmina Alexander (1871–1961), painting
- Jocelyne Alloucherie (born 1947), sculpture
- Helen Andersen (1919–1995), painting
- Lois Andison, installation art
- Julie Andreyev (born 1962), multidisciplinary art
- Evelyn Andrus (1909–1972), photographer
- Jaime Angelopoulos (born 1982), sculptor
- Sara Angelucci (born 1962), photography, video art
- Marie-Elmina Anger (1844–1901), painting
- Jennifer Angus (born 1961), installation art
- Elizabeth Angrnaqquaq (1916–2003), textile artist
- Irene Kataq Angutitok (1914–1971), sculpture
- Margaret Uyauperq Aniksak (1907–1993), sculpture
- Danielle April (born 1949)
- Raymonde April (born 1953), photography
- Joi Arcand (born 1982), photography
- Kate Armstrong, net art, writing
- Shelagh Armstrong (born 1961), illustration
- Germaine Arnaktauyok (born 1946), printmaking, painting
- Myfanwy Ashmore (born 1970), new media art
- Shuvinai Ashoona (born 1961), drawing
- Asinnajaq (born 1991), video artist
- Barbara Astman (born 1950), photography, new media
- Melissa Auf der Maur (born 1972), photography
- Eruoma Awashish (born 1980), Atikamekw visual artist

== B ==
- Lida Baday (born 1957), fashion designer
- Buseje Bailey, video and multi-media
- Unity Bainbridge (1916–2017), painting
- Anna P. Baker (1928–1985), painting
- Joan Balzar (1928–2016), painting
- Anna Banana (1940–2024), performance art, stamp art, small press publishing
- Marian Penner Bancroft (born 1947), photography
- Marian Bantjes (born 1963), design, illustration, writing
- Annie Gardner Barr (1864–1921)
- Lorna Bauer (born 1980), multi-media artist
- Tammy Beauvais (fl 1999), indigenous fashion designer
- Fanny Wright Bayfield (1813/14–1891), botanical illustration
- Anong Beam (fl 2002), indigenous painter
- Micheline Beauchemin (1929–2009), textile arts
- Claire Beaulieu (born 1955), multi-media
- Marie-Hélène Beaulieu (born 1979), glass artist
- Betty Beaumont (born 1946), environmental art
- Kate Beaton (born 1983), comics artist
- Beaver Hall Group
- Sarah Beck, sculpture
- Sylvie Bélanger (1951–2020), video, photography, installation
- Christi Belcourt (born 1966), painting
- Rebecca Belmore (born 1960), performance, installation
- Lorraine Bénic (born 1937), painting, sculpture
- Cecilia Berkovic, mixed-media artist
- Rachel Berman (1946–2014), painting, illustration
- Judith Berry (born 1961), painting
- Edith Hallett Bethune (1890–1970), photographer
- Nia Faith Betty (born 2001), fashion designer
- Aggie Beynon, metalwork
- Olive Biller (1879–1957), painting, illustration
- Alexandra Biriukova (1895–1967), architect
- Yulia Biriukova (1897–1972), painting
- Mary E. Black (1895–1988), textile arts, writing
- Persimmon Blackbridge (born 1951), performance art, installation, video, sculpture, writing
- Valérie Blass (born 1967), sculpture
- Susanna Blunt (born 1941), painting
- Molly Lamb Bobak (1922–2014), printmaking, painting
- Eleanor Bond (born 1948), painting, printmaking, sculpture
- Marion Bond (1903–1965), painting
- Mary Borgstrom (1916–2019), ceramics, primitive pottery
- Diane Borsato (born 1973), performance, installation, photography, video
- Dianne Bos (born 1956), photographer
- Céline Boucher (born 1945), painting, drawing, sculpture
- Diana Boulay (born 1946), sculpture
- Marie-Claude Bouthillier (born 1960), contemporary artist
- Deanna Bowen (born 1969), video, installation, performance, sculpture, photography
- Fiona Bowie, film, video, photography, sculpture
- Shary Boyle (born 1972), sculpture, painting, performance
- Sheree Bradford-Lea (fl 1994), cartoonist
- Alexandra Bradshaw (1888–1981), watercolors
- Eva Theresa Bradshaw (1871–1938), painting
- Sandra Bromley, sculpture
- Reva Brooks (1913–2004), photography
- Vera Brosgol (born 1984), cartoonist
- Lorna Brown (born 1958), public art
- Karin Bubaš (born 1976), photography, painting
- Annemarie Buchmann-Gerber (1947–2015), textiles, fiber arts
- Krista Buecking (born 1982), sculpture, installation
- Tishynah Buffalo (fl 2010), indigenous fashion designer
- Angela Bulloch (born 1966), installation, sound
- Nina Bunjevac (born 1973), Serbian-Canadian cartoonist
- Della Burford (born 1946), painting, writing
- Kay Burns, performance, locative media, photography, sculpture, video
- Cathy Bursey-Sabourin (born 1957), design
- Cathy Busby (born 1958), printed matter
- Sheila Butler (born 1938), painting, printmaking

== C ==
- Geneviève Cadieux (born 1955), photography
- Sveva Caetani (1917–1994), watercolors
- Ghitta Caiserman-Roth (1923–2005), painting and printmaking
- Dorothy Caldwell (born 1948), fiber arts
- Chrystal Callahan, photography
- Elaine Cameron-Weir (born 1985), sculpture
- Dale Campbell (born 1954), carving
- Valerie Campbell-Harding (1932–2006), textile arts
- Nicole Camphaug (fl 2015), Inuk fashion designer
- Janet Cardiff (born 1957), sound installation
- Florence Carlyle (1864–1923), painting
- J.R. Carpenter (born 1972), hypermedia, writing
- Emily Carr (1871–1945), painting
- Geneviève Castrée (1981–2016), comics, illustration
- Mabel Cawthra (1871–1943), painting
- Christiane Chabot (born 1950), multidisciplinary
- Ruth Chambers (born 1960), installation art
- Millicent Mary Chaplin (1790–1858), watercolour
- Monique Charbonneau (1928–2014), painter
- Lyne Charlebois, photography
- Judy Chartrand (born 1959), ceramics, found object art, beadwork, quillwork
- Svetlana Chmakova (born 1979), comics
- Olivia Chow (born 1957), sculpture
- Delores Churchill (born 1929), weaving
- June Clark (artist) (born 1941), photography, sculpture and collage
- Paraskeva Clark (1898–1986), painting
- Dana Claxton (born 1959), filmmaking, photography, performance art
- Alberta Cleland (1876–1960), painting
- Wendy Coburn (1963–2015), sculpture
- Lynne Cohen (1944–2014), photography
- Martha Cole (born 1946), textiles, artist's books
- Susan Collett (born 1961), printmaker, ceramist
- Katherine Collins (born 1947), cartoonist, writer, composer
- Nicole Collins, painting, performance, video, sound art
- Petra Collins (born 1992), photography
- Nora Collyer (1898–1979), painting
- Stéphanie Colvey (born 1949), photography
- Edith Grace Coombs (1890–1986), painting
- Emily Coonan (1885–1971), painting
- Corno (1952–2016), painting
- Michèle Cournoyer (born 1943), animation
- Linda Craddock (born 1952), visual artist
- Kate Craig (1947–2002), video, performance art
- Sarah Lindley Crease (1826–1922), watercolors, botanical illustration
- Marlene Creates (born 1952), land-based installation
- Jill Culiner (born 1945), photography
- Jane Catherine Cummins (1841–1893), painting
- Ruth Cuthand (born 1954), painting, printmaking
- Randy Lee Cutler (born 1964), collage, performance, writing
- Colleen Cutschall (born 1951), Oglala-Sicangu Lakota multi-media artist
- Gertrude Spurr Cutts (1858–1941), painting
- Nina Czegledy, new media

== D ==
- Crista Dahl (1934), multimedia artist
- Karen Dahl (born 1955), ceramics artist
- Greta Dale (1929–1978), sculptor
- Kathleen Daly (1898–1994), painter
- Madeleine Dansereau (1922–1991), jeweler
- Sylvia Daoust (1902–2004), sculptor
- Karin Davie (born 1965), painter
- Char Davies (born 1954), multimedia artist
- Sally Davies (born 1956), painter, photographer
- Olea Marion Davis (1899–1977), sculptor, ceramist
- Paloma Dawkins (fl 2015), cartoonist, video game designer
- Katherine Day (1889–1976), painter, printmaker
- Adriana de Barros (born 1976), illustrator, web designer, and poet
- Dora de Pedery-Hunt (1913–2008), sculptor
- Roseline Delisle (1952–2003), ceramic artist
- Jen Delos Reyes
- Angela DeMontigny (fl 1995), indigenous fashion designer
- Shawna Dempsey and Lorri Millan
- Simone Dénéchaud (1905–1974), painter
- Kady MacDonald Denton (born 1941), children's book illustrator
- Bonnie Devine (born 1952)
- Sarindar Dhaliwal (born 1953), multimedia artist
- Freda Diesing (1925–2002), carver
- Mary Dignam (1857–1938), painter
- Jess Dobkin (born 1970), performance artist
- Susan Dobson (born 1965), photographer and installation artist
- Katherine Dodds
- Melissa Doherty (born 1967), painter
- Eva Brook Donly (1867–1941), painter
- Audrey Capel Doray (1931–2025), painter, printmaker, electronic artist, muralist, filmmaker
- Julie Doucet (1867–1941), painter
- Marie-Denise Douyon (born 1961), painter, illustrator
- Margaret Dragu (1953), performance artist, visual artist, writer
- Anne Macintosh Duff (1925–2022), watercolour artist
- Aleksandra Dulic (born 1973), interactive installation artist, performer
- Delree Dumont, painter
- Alma Duncan (1917–2004), painter, filmmaker
- Carol Dunlop (1946–1982), photographer
- Chantal duPont (1942–2019), multidisciplinary artist
- Dominique Dupuis (born 1987)
- Linda Duvall, multidisciplinary artist
- Aganetha Dyck (1937–2025), sculptor

== E ==
- Mary Alexandra Bell Eastlake (1854–1951), painter
- Jessica Eaton (born 1977), photographer
- Paraskeva Clark (1898-1986), painter
- Hayley Elsaesser, fashion designer
- Julie Enfield, photographer
- Panya Clark Espinal (born 1965), sculptor
- Kingmeata Etidlooie (1915–1989), visual artist and sculptor
- Leya Evelyn (born 1937), painter
- Janieta Eyre (born 1971), photographer

== F ==
- Lilias Farley (1907–1989), painter, sculptor, muralist
- Caroline Farncomb (1859–1951), painter
- Claire Fauteux (1889–1988), painter
- Holly Fay, drawer, painter, installation
- Lillian Prest Ferguson (1867–1955), painter
- Marcelle Ferron (1924–2001), painter
- Julie Flett, painter
- Lita Fontaine, interdisciplinary artist
- Harriet Mary Ford (1859–1938), painter, muralist, jeweler
- Nita Forrest (1926–1996), painter
- Mina Forsyth (1921–1987), painter
- Hannah Franklin (born 1937), painter, sculptor
- Leanne Franson (born 1963), illustrator, cartoonist
- Maida Parlow French (1891–1977), artist and writer
- Vera Frenkel (born 1938), multidisciplinary artist
- Janine Fuller (born 1958)

== G ==
- Millie Gamble (1887–1986), photographer
- Ariel Garten (born 1979), fashion designer, artist
- Marianna Gartner (born 1963), painter
- Alyne Gauthier-Charlebois (1908–1955), painter
- Marie-Louise Gay (born 1952), illustrator
- Erin Gee (born 1983), new media and interactive artist
- Rosemary Georgeson, multimedia artist
- Lise Gervais (1933–1998), painter, sculptor
- Karine Giboulo (born 1980), diorama artist
- Lorraine Gilbert (born 1955), photographer
- Melanie Gilligan (born 1979)
- Miriam Ginestier (born 1968), interdisciplinary performance curator
- Seema Goel, multidisciplinary artist
- Dina Goldstein (born 1969), photographer
- Betty Goodwin (1923–2008), painter, sculptor
- Hortense Gordon (1886–1961), abstract artist
- Pnina Granirer (born 1935), painter
- Jill Greenberg (born 1967), photographer
- Erica Deichmann Gregg (1913–2007), studio potter
- Dorothy Grant (fl 1988), indigenous fashion designer
- Angela Graurholz (born 1952), photographer
- Grimes (born 1988), visual artist
- Angela Grossmann (born 1955), painter
- Pia Guerra, comic book artist

== H ==
- Alice Mary Hagen (1872–1972), potter
- Clara Hagarty (1871–1958), painter
- Libby Hague (born 1950), installation artist
- Amanda K. Hale
- Elizabeth Amherst Hale (1774–1826), painter
- Jean Hall (1896–1982), architect, known for mechanical drawing
- Sarah Hall (born 1951), stained glass artist
- Henrietta Hamilton (1780–1857), painter
- Mary Riter Hamilton (1873–1954), painter
- Lyn Hancock, photojournalist, wildlife photographer
- Ann Alexandra Harbuz (1908–1989), folk artist
- Naomi Harris (born 1973), photographer
- Teva Harrison (1976–2019), graphic artist, illustrator
- Iris Hauser (born 1956), painter
- Iris Häussler (born 1962), installation artist
- Bobs Cogill Haworth (1900–1988), painter, potter
- Elora Hardy (fl 2010), fashion designer
- Eileen Hazell (1903–1984), sculptor, potter
- Estelle Hecht (died 1971), printer, gallery owner
- Janet Hetherington (born 1955)
- Prudence Heward (1896–1947), painter
- Annie Hewlett (1887–1974), artist and writer
- Faith Erin Hicks, cartoonist, animator
- Esther Hill (1895–1985), architect, designer
- Gilah Yelin Hirsch (born 1944), painter
- Marla Hlady (born 1965), painter, sculptor
- Adrianne Ho (fl 2021), fashion designer
- Elizabeth Bradford Holbrook (1913–2009), portrait sculptor, medal designer, liturgical artist
- Heidi Hollinger (born 1968), photographer
- Margaret Lindsay Holton (born 1955), painter
- Risa Horowitz (born 1970), visual and media artist
- Yvonne McKague Housser (1897–1996), painter
- Barbara Howard (1926–2002), painter, engraver
- Ruth Howard (born 1957)
- Amelia Frances Howard-Gibbon (1826–1874), painter
- Spring Hurlbut (born 1952), sculptor
- Natalka Husar (born 1951), painter

== I ==
- Iola Abraham Ikkidluak (1936–2003), sculptor
- Dana Inkster, media artist, filmmaker
- Olive Mamak Innakatsik (1915–1994)
- Carole Itter (born 1939), sculptor, filmmaker
- Jane Isakson (born 1965), painter

== J ==
- Sarah Jackson (1924–2004), sculptor, digital artist
- Sybil Henley Jacobson (1881–1953), painter
- Ann James (1925–2011), sculptor, ceramist
- Aurora James (born 1984), fashion designer
- Tara Jarmon (fl 1990s), fashion designer
- Lucy Jarvis (1896–1985), painter
- Doreen Jensen (1933–2009), sculptor, curator
- Sophie Jodoin (born 1965), visual artist
- Laurel Johannesson
- Ursula Johnson (born 1980), multidisciplinary artist
- Gladys Johnston (1906–1983), landscape painter
- Lynn Johnston (born 1947), cartoonist
- G. B. Jones (born 1965), musician, artist and filmmaker
- Janet Jones (1952–2025), painter
- Michaele Jordana (born 1947), painter
- Bushra Junaid, painter, curator

== K ==
- Victoria Kakuktinniq (born 1989), Inuk fashion designer
- Nomi Kaplan (born 1933), Lithuanian-Canadian photographer
- Zahra Kazemi (1948–2003), photographer
- Gertrude Kearns (born 1950), war artist
- Shelagh Keeley (born 1954)
- Siassie Kenneally (1969–2018)
- Marsha Kennedy (born 1951)
- Janice Kerbel (born 1969)
- Estelle Muriel Kerr (1879–1971)
- Katja MacLeod Kessin (1959–2006), painter
- Najat El-Khairy
- Arounna Khounnoraj, textile artist
- Jane Kidd (born 1952), tapestry artist
- Janet Kigusiuq (1926–2005)
- Alicia Killaly (1836–1908), painter
- Mabel Killam Day (1884–1960), artist
- Ada Gladys Killins (1901–1963), painter
- Winnifred Kingsford (1880–1947), sculptor
- Ada Florence Kinton (1859–1905)
- Ann Kipling (1934–2023)
- Germaine Koh (born 1967)
- Wanda Koop (born 1951), painter
- Elaine Kowalsky (1948–2005), printmaker
- Donna Kriekle (born 1945)
- Madeleine Isserkut Kringayak (1928–1984), sculptor
- Myra Kukiiyaut (1929–2006), Inuk artist
- Maya Kulenovic (born 1975), painter
- Anita Kunz (born 1956)

== L ==
- Sophie Labelle (fl 2013), cartoonist
- Françoise Labbé (1933–2001)
- Martha Ladly
- Laiwan (born 1961)
- Suzy Lake (born 1947)
- Gisèle Lamoureux (1942–2018), photographer
- Artis Lane (born 1927), painter
- Dawn Langstroth (born 1979), painter
- Anne Langton (1804–1893), painter
- Yvette Lapointe (1912–1994), pioneer of Quebec comics
- Christine Laptuta (born 1951), photographer
- Marie-Thérèse Lasselle (1735–1819), embroiderer, watercolorist
- Dinah Lauterman (1899–1945), sculptor
- Michelle LaVallee (born 1977)
- Marguerite Vincent Lawinonkié (1783–1865)
- Caroline Leaf (born 1946)
- Jo Lechay, painter
- Edeline Lee (fl 2016), fashion designer
- Sky Lee (born 1952)
- Jennifer Lefort (born 1976), painter
- Martha Stewart Leitch (1918–2015)
- Irène Legendre (1904–1992), painter
- Enid Legros-Wise (born 1943), ceramist
- Rita Letendre (1928–2021), painter
- Laura Letinsky (born 1962), photographer
- Marilyn Levine (1935–2005)
- Maud Lewis (1903–1970), painter
- Tau Lewis (born 1993), contemporary artist
- Mabel Lockerby (1882–1976), painter
- Judith Lodge (born 1941), painter and photographer
- Karen Lofgren (born 1976)
- Marion Long (1882–1970), painter
- Mary Longman (born 1964)
- Frances Loring (1887–1968)
- Michèle Lorrain (born 1960), painter and installation artist
- Irene Loughlin (born 1967)
- Helen Lucas (1931–2023)
- Alexandra Luke (1901–1967), painter
- Linda Lundström (born 1951), fashion designer
- Irene Luxbacher (born 1970)
- Laura Muntz Lyall (1860–1930), painter

== M ==
- Toshiko MacAdam (born 1940)
- Landon Mackenzie (born 1954), painter
- Myfanwy MacLeod (born 1961)
- Lani Maestro (born 1957)
- Liz Magor (born 1948)
- Jeannie Mah (born 1952)
- Christine Major (born 1966), painter
- Lorraine Malach (1933–2003), ceramist, painter
- Erin Manning (born 1969)
- Jovette Marchessault (1938–2012)
- Deborah Margo (born 1961), multimedia artist
- Tanya Mars (born 1948), performance and video artist
- Agnes Martin (1912–2004), painter
- Annie Martin
- Camille Martin (born 1956)
- Paryse Martin (born 1959)
- Mabel May (1877–1971), painter
- Elza Mayhew (1916–2004), sculptor
- Sanaz Mazinani (born 1978)
- Jo-Anne McArthur (born 1976), photographer
- Kelly McCallum (born 1979)
- Doris McCarthy (1910–2010), painter
- Jillian McDonald
- Susan McEachern (born 1951)
- Elizabeth McGillivray Knowles (1866–1928), painter
- Florence Helena McGillivray (1864–1938), painter
- Barbara McGivern (1945–2019), painter
- Elizabeth McIntosh (born 1967)
- Rita McKeough (born 1951)
- Mary R. McKie (active 1840–1862), painter
- Ruth Gowdy McKinley (1931–1981), ceramist
- Sheila McKinnon, photographer
- Isabel McLaughlin (1903–2002), painter
- Helen McLean (1927–2017)
- Dayna McLeod (born 1972)
- Pegi Nicol MacLeod (1904–1949), painter
- Fannie Knowling McNeil (1869–1928)
- Helen McNicoll (1879–1915), painter
- Margaret Campbell Macpherson (1860–1931), painter
- Lucy Meeko (1929–2004), sculptor, printmaker, basket maker and seamstress
- Divya Mehra (born 1981)
- Sandra Meigs (born 1953), painter
- Barbara Meneley
- Olia Mishchenko (born 1980)
- Tricia Middleton (born 1972)
- Lorna Mills
- Carol Milne (born 1962)
- Lisa Milroy (born 1959), painter
- Allyson Mitchell (born 1967)
- Ellen Moffat (born 1954)
- Melinda Mollineaux (born 1964)
- Belinda Montgomery (born 1950), painter
- Geraldine Moodie (1854–1945), photographer
- Julie Moos (born 1966), photographer and art writer
- Shani Mootoo (born 1957), painter
- Kathleen Morris (1893–1986), painter
- Alexandra Morrison
- Rita Mount (1885–1967), painter
- Clara Mountcastle (1837–1908), painter
- Kathleen Munn (1887–1974), painter
- Paula Murray (born 1958)
- Nadia Myre (born 1974)

== N ==
- Melaw Nakehk'o, painter
- Agnes Nanogak (1925–2001)
- Mina Napartuk (1913–2001), Inuk fashion designer
- Imona Natsiapik (born 1966)
- Ellen Neel (1916–1966)
- Tracey Neuls
- Lilias Torrance Newton (1896–1980), painter
- Grace Nickel (born 1956), ceramist
- Marion Nicoll (1909–1985), painter
- Shelley Niro (born 1954), painter
- Marie-Paule Nolin (1908–1987), fashion designer
- Farah Nosh, photojournalist
- Guity Novin (born 1944), painter

== O ==
- Alanis Obomsawin (born 1932)
- Daphne Odjig (1919–2016), painter
- Ethel Ogden (1869–1902), painter and educator
- Katie Ohe (born 1937), sculptor
- Lucille Oille (1912–1997), sculptor, wood engraver and book illustrator
- Haruko Okano (born 1945), mixed-media artist
- Maudie Rachel Okittuq (born 1944), sculptor
- Kim Ondaatje (born 1928), painter
- Midi Onodera (born 1961)
- Jessie Oonark (1906–1985)
- Sheila Shaen Orr (born 1964)

== P ==
- P. K. Page (1916–2010), painter
- Mimi Parent (1924–2005)
- Edie Parker (born 1956)
- Helen Parsons Shepherd (1923–2008), painter
- Roula Partheniou (born 1977), contemporary artist
- Barbara Paterson (born 1935)
- Myfanwy Pavelic (1916–2007), portrait painter
- Jan Peacock (born 1955)
- Sophie Pemberton (1869–1959), painter
- Dany Pen (born 1986), artist, activist, and educator
- Rae Perlin (1910–2006), painter
- Vessna Perunovich (born 1960), painter, sculptor
- Nancy Petry (1931–2024)
- Christiane Pflug (1936–1972), painter
- Ciara Phillips (born 1976)
- Paulette Phillips (born 1956)
- Rina Piccolo, cartoonist
- Marjorie Pigott (1904–1990)
- Bev Pike (born 1953)
- Susan Point (born 1952)
- Jane Ash Poitras (born 1951), painter
- Annie Pootoogook (1969–2016)
- Napachie Pootoogook (1938–2002), graphic artist
- Sharni Pootoogook (1922–2003), printmaker
- Alicia Popoff (1950–2015), painter
- Barbara Pratt (born 1963), painter
- Mary Pratt (1935–2018), painter
- Innukjuakju Pudlat (1913–1972), printmaker
- Lucy Pullen (born 1971), contemporary artist

== Q ==
- Mary Qayuaryuk (1908–1982), printmaker and midwife
- Lucy Qinnuayuak (1915–1982), graphic artist and printmaker
- Nathalie Quagliotto (born 1984)
- Ruth Qaulluaryuk (born 1932), Inuk textile artist
- Quilla (born 1982)

== R ==
- Rosemary Radcliffe (born 1949), painter
- Judy Radul (born 1962)
- Anirnik Ragee (born 1935), visual artist
- Nina Raginsky (born 1941), photographer
- Laura Evans Reid (1883–1951), painter
- Sheilah Wilson ReStack (born 1975), video artist
- Kina Reusch (1940–1988)
- Catherine Richards (born 1952)
- Sue Richards (1958–2014)
- Lynn Richardson
- Alix Cléo Roubaud (1952–1983), photographer
- Louise Robert (born 1941), painter
- Sarah Robertson (1891–1948), painter
- Christine Roche (born 1939), illustrator, cartoonist
- Danièle Rochon (born 1946), painter
- Dorothea Rockburne (born 1929), painter
- Ethel Rosenfield (1910–2000), sculptor
- Elizabeth Eaton Rosenthal (born 1941)
- Hilda Katherine Ross (1902–1989), potter, painter, and educator
- Susan Ross (1915–2006), painter
- Mariette Rousseau-Vermette (1926–2006), tapestry artist
- Marina Roy, painter
- Lorna Russell (1933–2023), painter
- Su Rynard (born 1961), video artist and film director

== S ==
- Pitaloosie Saila (1942–2021)
- Buffy Sainte-Marie (born 1941)
- Taslim Samji
- Eliyakota Samualie (1939–1987), graphic artist and sculptor
- Nicotye Samayualie (born 1983), graphic artist
- Anne Savage (1896–1971), painter
- Charlotte Schreiber (1834–1922), painter
- Marian Dale Scott (1906–1993), painter
- Mary Scott (born 1948), painter
- Ethel Seath (1879–1963), painter
- Regina Seiden (1897–1991), painter
- Sandra Semchuck (born 1948), photographer
- Catherine Senitt (born 1945), painter
- Bojana Sentaler (fl 2000s), Serbian-Canadian fashion designer
- Susan Shantz (born 1957)
- Margaret Shelton (1915–1984)
- Erin Shirreff (born 1975)
- Henrietta Shore (1880–1963), painter
- Adele Sigguk (born 1961)
- Floria Sigismondi (born 1965), photographer
- Elizabeth Simcoe (1762–1850), painter
- Lorraine Simms (born 1956), painter
- Leah Singer, photographer and multimedia artist
- Clara Sipprell (1885–1975), photographer
- Cathy Sisler
- Ruby Slipperjack (born 1952), painter
- Edith Smith (1867–1954), painter
- Freda Pemberton Smith (1902–1991), painter
- Jori Smith (1907–2005), painter
- Frances-Anne Solomon (born 1966)
- Doris Huestis Speirs (1894–1989), painter
- Arlene Stamp (born 1938)
- Lisa Steele (born 1947)
- Noreen Stevens (born 1962), cartoonist
- Penelope Stewart
- Marie Elyse St. George (born 1929)
- Jana Sterbak (born 1955), sculptor
- Reva Stone (born 1944)
- Leesa Streifler (born 1957)
- Martha Sturdy (born 1942)
- Gio Swaby (born 1991)
- Magda Szabo (1934–2024), painter

== T ==
- Tanya Tagaq (born 1975)
- Ernestine Tahedl (born 1940)
- Sylvia Tait (born 1932), painter
- Jillian Tamaki (born 1980)
- Mariko Tamaki (born 1975)
- Janice Tanton (born 1961)
- Monica Tap (born 1962), painter
- Ewa Tarsia (born 1959)
- Tanya Taylor (fl 2012), fashion designer
- Angotigolu Teevee (1910–1967), printmaker
- Ningeokuluk Teevee (born 1963)
- Althea Thauberger (born 1970), photographer
- Jeannie Thib (1955–2013), sculptor
- Jan Thornhill (born 1955)
- Mildred Valley Thornton (1890–1967), painter
- Irene Avaalaaqiaq Tiktaalaaq (born 1941)
- Joanne Tod (born 1953)
- Gayla Trail (born 1973), photographer
- Sydney Strickland Tully (1860–1911)
- Camille Turner (born 1960)
- Natalie Turner
- Lucy Tasseor Tutsweetok (1934–2012), sculptor
- Marion Tuu'luq (1910–2002), Inuk textile artist

== U ==
- Kartz Ucci (1961–2013)
- Malorie Urbanovitch (born 1988), fashion designer

== V ==
- Florence Vale (1909–2003), painter
- Liz Vandal (fl 1988), fashion designer
- Blanche Lemco van Ginkel (1923–2022)
- Claire Van Vliet (born 1933)
- Margaret Elizabeth Vanderhaeghe (1950–2012)
- Laura Vickerson (born 1959)
- Rita Vinieris (born 1964), fashion designer
- Lea Vivot (born 1948), sculptor

== W ==
- Marion Wagschal (born 1943), painter
- Carol Wainio (born 1955), painter
- Laurie Walker (1962–2011)
- Katherine Wallis (1861–1957), sculptor
- Edith Watson (1861–1943), photographer
- Barbara Weaver-Bosson (born 1953), painter
- Anna Weber (1814–1888), fraktur artist and needleworker
- Laura Wee Láy Láq (born 1952), ceramicist
- Susanna Haliburton Weldon (1817–1899), artist and ceramics collector
- Esther Wertheimer (1926–2016), sculptor
- Colette Whiten (born 1945), sculptor
- Diane Whitehouse (born 1940), painter
- Irene Whittome (born 1942)
- Joyce Wieland (1930–1998)
- Shirley Wiitasalo (born 1949), painter
- Tania Willard (born 1977)
- Jennifer Willet (born 1975), artist, researcher and curator
- Margaux Williamson (born 1976)
- Shannon Wilson fashion designer
- Winsom (born 1946), multimedia artist
- Chloe Wise (born 1990)
- Catherine Mary Wisnicki (1919–2014)
- Colleen Wolstenholme (born 1963), sculptor
- Elizabeth Wyn Wood (1903–1966), sculptor
- Kamila Wozniakowska (born 1956), painter
- Janice Wright-Cheney (born 1961)
- Mary E. Wrinch (1877–1969), painter
- Adrienne Wu (born 1990), fashion designer
- Florence Wyle (1881–1968), sculptor
- Dana Wyse (born 1965)

== Y ==
- Xiaojing Yan (born 1978)
- M. A. Yewdale (1908–2000)
- Jin-me Yoon (born 1960)
- Jinny Yu (born 1976), painter and installation artist

== Z ==
- Joy Zemel Long (1922–2018), painter
- Elizabeth Zvonar (born 1972), mixed-media artist
- Marguerite Porter Zwicker (1904–1993), painter
