= Quagliotto =

Quagliotto is an Italian surname. Notable people with the surname include:

- Nadia Quagliotto (born 1997), Italian racing cyclist
- Nathalie Quagliotto (born 1984), Canadian artist
