= Timeraiser =

Timeraiser is a Canadian non-profit organization that hosts art auctions where bids are placed in volunteer hours rather than dollars. The organization was founded in 2002 by Anil Patel with the intent of supporting both emerging artists and non-profit organizations. The first Timeraiser was held in Toronto in 2004, and the organization expanded to Calgary in 2006. By 2012 it was being held annually in 12 Canadian cities. It remains active across Canada in many cities, including Edmonton, Montreal, Ottawa, Regina, and Vancouver. The Frameworks Foundation now operates the events.

== Event structure ==
Corporate donations are used to purchase pieces from emerging artists at market value. The pieces are then presented at gala parties in silent auction format. Participants make written bids in volunteer hours for a limited selection of non-profits selected by jury panel. Bidders are limited to a maximum of 125 hours per piece. If multiple people make the maximum bid on a single piece, the winner is decided by random draw. The winning bidder has one year to complete their set number of hours, and receives their art piece when their hours have been completed. In the meantime, the art is displayed in the community in a rotation of coffee shops, non-profits, and corporate settings.

== Featured artists ==
Notable Canadian artists who have donated artwork to or been featured by Timeraiser include:

- Nathalie Quagliotto
