= Barbara Meneley =

Canadian visual artist and educator

- Known for: visual artist
- Notable work: Unsettling the Last Best West: Restorying Settler Imaginaries
- Movement: new media art
- Website: www.barbarameneley.com

Barbara Meneley is a contemporary Canadian visual artist and educator based in Regina, Saskatchewan. She is known for her new media art, which brings together elements of media, installation art and performance art in solo and curated group exhibitions throughout Canada.

== Background ==
Meneley received a BA in Communications (1994 Simon Fraser University), Visual Arts Major (1995–1999 Emily Carr University), MFA Visual Arts in Intermedia (2009 University of Regina), and PhD in Cultural Studies (2011–2015 Queen's University).

Meneley is an instructor at The University of Regina and First Nations University of Canada in Regina, Saskatchewan.

== Methodology ==
According to Dr. Risa Horowitz, a cohort of Canadian university-based artist-researchers, such as Barbara Meneley, employ practice-based research methodologies in which the "functions of research, creation and dissemination are complexly iterative, intertwined and reflexive", more prominently than in traditional art practice. Meneley's new media art brings together elements of media, installation art, performance art, as well as cultural mapping practices such as engagement in dialogic practice with observers, historical analysis and theoretical inquiry. For example, during a work's development, Meneley follows a deliberate routine of being open to public input and commentary, so that the background research and the artwork is in part a product of engaged dialog. This reflects an interest in educating through creative expression, in acknowledgment of an ideology that all people have within themselves creative capacities, which can be accessed by locating their personal means of expression. According to Reyes, individual artist-researcher projects come together in socially engaged art practices which incorporate "elements including workshops, exhibitions, residencies, pedagogy, curatorial practice and collaboration."

Meneley has stated that because her process is often determined through experimental responses to a particular discourse "[she has] to be clear on what [she says] textually, and doing that contributes to clarity in [her] material work. Again, as at every stage, process of problem solving are integral, incorporating inquiry and resolving the aesthetic, conceptual, material, and practical elements."

== Works ==
Her projects have often been auto-ethnographic reflections, which analyze the discourse of colonial history, institutions, or land possession issues. A partial list follows.

=== I Have a Secret (2007) ===
This project has been screened in Toronto, Calgary, Kingston and Saskatoon. The short experimental film was considered "remarkable for its linear innocence".

=== Luminance (2009–2010) ===
Meneley created Luminance as the Isabel Johnson Shelter Artist in Residence in Regina, Saskatchewan. She worked with people in shelters to create a city-wide participatory display of ice lanterns. "In creating this connection we extend awareness of domestic violence issues beyond the physical confines of our shelters and suggest that everyone has a role in making all spaces safe."

=== The Breathing City (2010) ===
Meneley was an artist-in-residence at the Saskatchewan Arts Board in 2010. She worked with visitors to the Queen City EX 2010 to create a collaborative art installation, The Breathing City.

=== The Whispering City (2010) ===
Natural Forms: idyllic landscape and social forms in contemporary practices was a curated group exhibition held at Neutral Ground Gallery in Regina, Saskatchewan. Meneley's The Whispering City examined civic planning and the "City Beautiful" movement. City plans and maps were incorporated into a mobile made of long strips of light paper; these moved and turned with the slightest movement of observers. Meneley's intent was to give viewers a sense of agency, reinforcing the idea that "Everyone makes a mark on their city, each person can change the city fabric." Meneley has emphasized the importance of integrating architecture into local environments.

=== Unofficial Apology (2011) ===
Meneley's performance piece Unofficial Apology physically acted out the word "apology" in semaphore signals, using red and white maple leaf flags. It was created as a response to the Canadian government's apology to native people for the history of the residential school program in 2008. It also sought to critique the withdrawal of government funding for the First Nations University of Canada in 2010.

=== Unsettling the Last Best West (2012–2015) ===
In Unsettling the Last Best West: Restorying Settler Imaginaries, Meneley undertook an auto-ethnographic investigation as a "settler, settler descendant, and treaty person, focusing on a settler audience to contribute to anticolonial dialogues and conciliation in contemporary sites." Completed for her PhD project, it consisted of five sub-projects each contributing to her concept surrounding settler imaginaries, which are rooted in analyzing the historical advertising strategies that brought settlers to present day Canada:

- Leaf Forever, video animation, 2012.
- Unsettling, performance at Fifth Parallel Gallery, Regina, SK, 17 May 2015.
- A Complicated Hole, performance video, 2014.
- Unmapping Assiniboia, paper and digital works, 2014.
- Unsettling the Last Best West, bookwork, 2014.

Meneley's work investigates how art was used in the promotion and dissemination of colonial ideologies and the recruitment of settlers to Canada in the late-nineteenth and early-twentieth centuries, under the aegis of Clifford Sifton, Canada's Minister of the Interior from 1896 to 1905. These historic advertising strategies were the product of a cross-disciplinary approach to communication; Meneley interrogates and challenges them in like manner. According to Horowitz, her work "appropriate(s), subvert(s) and reshape(s) the colonial visual communications strategies".

=== Prairie History Redux (2016) ===
Meneley created and displayed Prairie History Redux at the Regina Public Library (central location). The project looks at the history of the prairies from pre-colonial times to the present day, using tracings of previous works onto translucent paper, which are displayed in the library space. It was curated by Blair Fornwald, assistant curator at the Dunlop Art Gallery. The works, due to their fragile form, move and respond to the motion of viewers engaging with them, creating an element of intimacy between knowledge seekers and information. Due to the vast quantities of information in the collection, Meneley explored without a systematic approach, rather selecting her imagery and texts on their initial appeal. They were then traced and grouped with other findings, sometimes of a contradictory basis, encouraging conversations and thinking around overlapping histories of the area. As in past works, Meneley "describe[s] how art is used and how to use art as a strategy for personal transformation and for social and political critique."
