= Katherine Wallis =

Canadian artist (1861–1957)

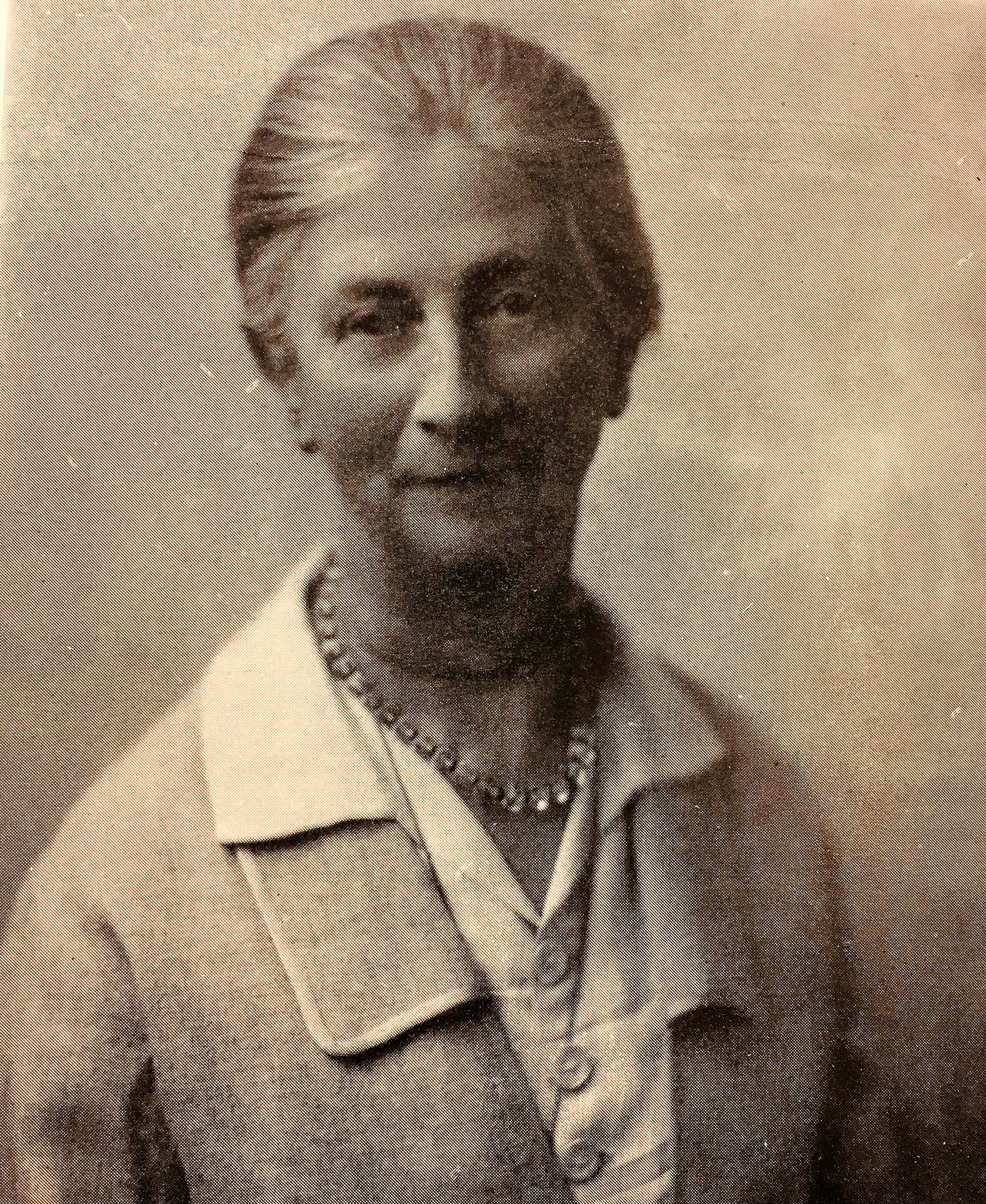
- Wallis from A Biographical Sketch of Katherine E. Wallis a Canadian Sculptor by Roger Collins
- Born: 1861; Merino, Peterborough, Canada West
- Died: 1957 (aged 95–96)
- Education: Toronto Art School; Edinburgh School of Arts; Royal College of Art
- Known for: Sculptor, painter, poet

Katherine Elizabeth Wallis (1861–1957) was a Canadian sculptor, a watercolor painter and poet. She traveled all over the world, observing art, studying sculpture and advancing her artistic career. Wallis is best known for bronze sculptures of animals and infants.

== Biography ==
=== Early life ===
Katherine Wallis was born in 1861 outside of Peterborough, Canada West. Her parents were James Wallis, a wealthy immigrant from Ireland who owned extensive land in the Kawartha Lakes region, and Louisa Forbes. The Wallis family estate included Drishane Castle in County Cork, Ireland, as well as many other lands and houses. James Wallis built a farm on the then outskirts of Peterborough he named Merino, after the breed of sheep he raised on the farm.

Each member of the Wallis family was artistically gifted including her mother who enjoyed music and singing. Wallis role models were her mother's friends, including Catharine Parr Traill, her sister Susanna Moodie and the painter Anne Langton. For a brief time, Wallis attended the Toronto Art School known today as OCAD University, but in the late 1800s there were few options for women practicing art professionally. During this time, women were not permitted to take life drawing classes with nude models. Langton told the Wallis sisters, "If you wish to obtain your dream, you cannot stay here." At this early time, Katherine Wallis had not yet realized she was interested in sculpture, but she knew that opportunities for female artists in Canada were limited.

=== Scotland (1878–1880) ===
Wallis and her sister Sussanna traveled to Scotland to visit their family. She enrolled in the Edinburgh School of Arts in 1878. While at the Scottish National Gallery as a copyist, Wallis was able to earn a living making copies of famous art works. In 1880, Wallis's mother became ill and the sisters returned home to take care of the farm. After her stay in Canada and tending the family's farm for the next thirteen years, Katherine Wallis had the freedom and financial stability to return to Europe.

=== London (1893–1899) ===
At 32, Wallis returned to Europe with her sister Adah. They settled in Dresden, Germany, and spent two years travelling around Europe, viewing famous paintings, sculptures and architecture. In 1895, Katherine Wallis enrolled in the London's Royal College of Art, RCA. She was taught by French-born sculptor Édouard Lantéri, a former pupil of Jacques-Louis David. While working with Lantéri, Wallis realized her passion for sculpture. Lantéri also taught her in "New Sculpture", which consisted of small scale bronzes of domestic subjects, including women and small animals. While studying at the RCA School of Design, she was awarded the RCA Bronze Medal. In 1897, Wallis received the Modeller's Free Scholarship, which allowed her to continue her studies for two more years until she decided to move to Paris.

=== Paris (1899–1939) ===
In Paris, Wallis focused on creating sculpture. Specifically, she enjoyed sculpting animals she observed at the Zoo. She met Oscar Waldmann in Paris at Jardin des plantes, which functions as a modern-day zoo. He encouraged her to submit one of her sculptures at the Exposition Universalle, which added to the recognition of her art. Wallis also exhibited her work at the spring salon in Paris. At this time, Wallis was studying animals and sculpting them into stone, marble and bronze. Notably, Wallis met Auguste Rodin in 1902. He encouraged her to sketch sculptures she saw at the Louvre. Rodin praised her figures' solid construction. Rodin wanted to see more of her work, but Wallis declined because her work was too hard to transport for his viewing, and because she already had great mentors like Lantéri and Waldmann.

In 1914, when World War I broke out, Wallis did not continue sculpting, but focused on the war efforts as a nurse in a Canadian Hospital in Paris. Her art was meant to be exhibited at the Canadian National Exhibition in Toronto, but due to the war, it was postponed. Once World War I ended, Wallis returned to her artistic career. In 1929, she became the first Canadian elected as the Sociétaire of the Société Nationale des Beaux-Arts for her sculpture La Lutte Pour la Vie. In 1920, she spent three years exhibiting works in Peterborough, Ontario, before she returned to Paris. She also spent five months in Bosnia and Greece, working in relief and water colour. She sent her works to England and within one year she exhibited her sculptures in London, Liverpool, Leeds and Glasgow. In 1936, when World War II broke out, she fled to California, which became her home for the rest of her life.

=== Santa Cruz (1939–1957) ===
The Santa Cruz Art League offered Wallis a personal exhibition, which she accepted. Wallis had a statewide show in the Santa Cruz Auditorium. Wallis was made a member of the National Society for Sanity in Art, which allowed her to exhibit once a year in San Francisco and Chicago. Through this society, she received a prize for Excellence in Sculpture, an award she won twice. In 1944, Wallis showed her sculptures Coming Always Nearer and Speed at the Santa Cruz Art League's Fifteenth Annual Exhibition. Later that year, she created a piece called Victory; a woman who smiles as she carries a dove while holding an olive branch.

== Notable works and accomplishments ==
Wallis had exhibitions at the Royal Academy in London during 1897, the Royal Canadian Academy of Arts from 1904 to 1937 and the National Gallery of Canada in 1928. Wallis received an honorable mention for her sculpture at the Exposition Universalle.

She was not only an exceptional sculptor, but a painter and a poet. Wallis's poems were published as a collection entitled Chips from the Block. In 1947, the National Gallery of Canada purchased Wallis's most famous sculpture, La Lutte pour la Vie. Upon her death, she bequeathed her art collection to the City of Peterborough and it is now part of the Peterborough Museum and Archives.
