= Lorraine Gilbert =

Canadian artist and photographer

Lorraine Gilbert (Photographer)
- Born: 1955; France
- Education: BSc in Biology from Mcgill University and a MFA from Concordia University
- Known for: Photography

Lorraine Gilbert (born 1955, France) is a Canadian artist and photographer focusing on landscape as a genre, raising questions pertaining to the social and economic aspects of landscape as art, as nature, and as lived experience. She lives in Ottawa and in Quebec.

== Early life and education ==
She holds a BSc in biology from McGill University (1979) and a MFA in Photography from Concordia University (1987). She also studied forestry at the University of British Columbia. In 1978, she went to study at the Banff Centre. She taught at Concordia University in Montreal and the Nova Scotia College of Art and Design in Halifax. Beside teaching, she also produced graphic design work for artists and musicians. She has been teaching art and photography for the past 25 years and has held the Director of the Visual Arts Department at the University of Ottawa.

== Artistic career ==
She has been a practicing artist since 1979, her work can be found in private, public national and international collections. Her work has been exhibited at the Canadian Museum of Contemporary Photography, the National Gallery of Canada the Ottawa Art Gallery, the Dalhousie Art Gallery and more.

From 1994 to 2004, Gilbert was actively involved as a publisher, host and board member with an Artist-Run Centre: Boreal Art Nature, based out of her home in La Minerve, Québec. There, artists from North and Central America, and from countries overseas as far as Iceland and India came together in the Canadian Boreal forest for artistic production in thematic residencies.

== Collections and exhibitions ==
Gilbert's work is held in the collection of the National Gallery of Canada. Her work has been published in The Landscape: Eight Canadian Photographers by Barbour, David, McMichael Canadian Art Collection, 1990.

1987: Lorraine Gilbert: Vancouver and Montreal Nights, Optica, A centre for Contemporary Arts, Montreal.

1991: The Landscape: Eight Canadian Photographers, Concordia Art Gallery, Montreal.

2008: The Tree: From the Sublime to the Social, Vancouver Art Gallery, Vancouver.

2009: Construction Work: Renovation Spirits, Carleton University Art Gallery, Ottawa.

2013: Flora and Fauna: 400 Years of Artists Inspired by Nature, National Gallery of Canada, Ottawa.

2013: Natural Motif installation with Group of Seven exhibition, Firestone collection, Ottawa Art Gallery, Ottawa.

2013: Arbor Vitae, City Hall Art Gallery, Ottawa.

2013: Lorraine Gilbert, Paysages canadiens 1988-2013, Galerie Expression, Saint-Hyacinthe.

2015: Pictures Windows, Storefront Photographs from the past 100 years, Equinox Gallery, Vancouver.

=== Style ===
Lorraine's early work constituted of photographs often taken at night to use the penetrating glare of the flashbulb to reconstruct a reality. Bushes takes on the appearance of skeletons; flowers and plants stand out against architectural backdrops; objects from everyday life – tables, umbrellas, ornaments – loom out of the night, transformed by the flash of the camera. The bluish tones of artificial light are mixed with the yellows and oranges of natural light. Lorraine has no need for realism: she explores a world alive with images that would otherwise remain invisible to the naked eye.

Inspired by her experience as a tree planter, some of her work involved heroic portraits of tree planters, questioning their roles in terms of forestry, economics, state of the world. She questions the ethics of replanting, of exploitations and the ecological context of the altered landscape.

She explores the intersection of art and ecology. She also uses the idea of documenting while challenging the idea of fabrication through the medium of digital photography.

In the early 2000s she produced a body of work called Icelandic Walks and Field Studies, constituted of large scale digital works examining the landscape genre.

=== Awards ===
She was awarded the Karsh Award in 2003 for her strong commitment to artistic excellence in photo-based art. The award is given by the city of Ottawa and comes with a monetized prize of $7500. She has been nominated to the RCA and was awarded a 'Canadian Foundation for Innovation' grant through the University of Ottawa in 2010.
