= Martha Sturdy =

Canadian artist and designer (born 1942)

- Born: 1942 (age 83–84); Vancouver, British Columbia
- Education: Emily Carr University of Art and Design
- Known for: sculptor
- Awards: Golden Jubilee Medal

Martha Sturdy (born 1942) is a Canadian artist and designer. Sturdy gained international attention for her wearable sculpture in the late 1970s, which evolved into further series of sculptural home furnishings using resin, steel, brass and salvaged cedar. Sturdy’s studio has since expanded to provide custom furniture, fixtures and artworks for fashion, retail and hospitality clients including Saks Fifth Avenue, Bergdorf Goodman, and Louis Vuitton.

== Early life ==
Martha Varcoe was born in 1942 in Vancouver, British Columbia. She received her BFA in visual arts from the Emily Carr University of Art and Design, graduating in 1978.

== Career ==
Early in her career, Sturdy was forced to adapt the proportions of her work due to the limited resources of a young art school graduate. She went on to gain an international reputation as a leader in functional art and design, with her wearable sculptures being featured in Elle, Vogue, and Harper's Bazaar as well as in the runway shows of fashion designers like Donna Karan, Oscar de la Renta, Marc Jacobs, and Calvin Klein. As Martha's studio grew, she was able to create larger pieces, expanding to make custom furniture, fixtures and artworks.

Sturdy's sculpture spans a range of media, including wall, standing steel and salvaged wood. Throughout her career as a sculptor, Sturdy's work has focused on nature, monumentality and balanced composition. In The Wall Street Journal, Sarah Medford described Sturdy's 2017 piece "Steel Screen" as "serene as an Asian landscape painting and, at 10 feet tall by 8 feet wide fully extended, as powerful as a mural."

Sturdy's "Reflections" sculpture series was shown at the VanDusen Botanical Gardens in Vancouver. She has a large outdoor sculpture installed at the Vancouver General Hospital as well as a steel piece at the Diana Krall Centre at the hospital. Sturdy also exhibits her work at international design trade fairs, including Maison et Objet in Paris. Sturdy is on the board of directors of Audain Art Museum Foundation.

=== Awards and commissions ===
In 2002, the Governor General awarded Sturdy a Golden Jubilee Medal and in 2005 she was inducted into the Royal Canadian Academy of Arts (RCA). Martha was commissioned for a permanent installation in the Vancouver Olympic Village in 2010 and in 2012 for a permanent installation in downtown Tokyo, Japan.
