= Millicent Mary Chaplin =

- Born: Millicent Mary Reeve; 1790; Leadenham
- Died: 1858 (aged 67–68)
- Known for: watercolour

Millicent Mary Chaplin (1790 – 1858) was an English-born amateur artist mainly known for her watercolours depicting 19th century Canada.

== Life ==
She was born Millicent Mary Reeve in Leadenham, Lincolnshire, and came to Lower Canada with her husband Thomas Chaplin of the Coldstream Guards in 1838. Her husband was a Lieutenant-Colonel stationed in Quebec City due to the fallout of the 1837–1838 Lower Canada Rebellion. Over the next four years she spent in Canada, Chaplin painted landscapes of Ottawa, Quebec City, and the Canadian Maritimes, as well as depictions of the local people. She also copied works by artists such as James Hope-Wallace, Henry William Barnard, and Philip John Bainbrigge. She created an album recounting her journaling and travels, which help approximately 130 watercolour paintings and drawings. About 90 of these works capture Quebec City, which she depicted in a meticulous, delicate style. Her creations help to create the visual legacy of nineteenth century Quebec.

Chaplin died in Normanby Park, Lincolnshire, in 1858.

Her work is held in the collections of the National Archives of Canada and the Royal Ontario Museum.

A collection of her watercolours and journals from her visit to Canada was published as Drawing on the Land: The New World Watercolours and Diaries (1838-1942) of Millicent Mary Chaplin (edited by Jim Burant) in 2004. (ISBN 1894131614).
