= Jessica Eaton =

Canadian photographer

- Born: 1977 (age 48–49); Regina, Saskatchewan
- Education: Emily Carr Institute
- Known for: Photographer
- Website: jessicaeaton.com

Jessica Eaton (born 1977) is a Canadian photographer living in Montreal, Quebec.

== Life ==
Eaton was born in 1977 in Regina, Saskatchewan, Canada, and she received a BFA in photography from the Emily Carr Institute. Her solo exhibitions include Wild Permutations at the Museum of Contemporary Art in Cleveland (USA), and Ad Infinitum at The Photographers' Gallery in London (UK). Eaton has been featured in multiple group exhibitions. Including: Under Construction (Netherlands), Color Acting (USA), Photography is Magic (South Korea). In 2016, Eaton was nominated for the Sobey Art Award. She was featured in the New York Times, The New Yorker, Art in America, ArtNews (Cover), and The Guardian. Eaton was awarded a Guggenheim Fellowship in 2019, identifying her as one of the most important current Canadian photographers.

== Work ==
Eaton's photographs focus mostly on some of the basic elements of photography: light, color, and exposure. By manipulating these different aspects in her photos, Eaton is able to explore the different possibilities within photography.

After moving from Vancouver to Toronto and then to Montreal, Eaton produced a career changing series of photos, "Cubes for Albers and LeWitt", for a show sponsored by Red Bull. The series of images are a tribute to artists Josef Albers and Sol LeWitt, taking inspiration from their minimalist and abstract style. Eaton exploits the camera, as she calls it, by continuously taking multiple shots of a cube painted in different colors without winding the exposure. Unlike painting, the added layers of shots on the same piece of film brightens the colors in the pictures. In some works she shoots only grey cubes and uses different color filters over the lens to expose the film.

Her photographs have appeared in publications such as Hunter and Cook, BlackFlash, Pyramid Power and Lay Flat 02: Meta. One of her photographs was chosen for the cover of the March 2011 issue of ARTnews. Her work has been included in a number of group and solo exhibitions in Canada and the United States, as well as in South Korea, Amsterdam, and London.

== Awards ==
In 2011, Eaton received the Bright Spark Award from the Magenta Foundation. She was awarded the prize for photography at the Hyères International Festival of Fashion and Photography in 2012. In 2019, Eaton was awarded a Guggenheim Fellowship in the field of photography.

== Collections ==
Eaton's work is included in the permanent collections of:

- Museum of Contemporary Art, Montreal
- National Gallery of Canada
