= Maudie Rachel Okittuq =

Inuk sculptor

- Born: 1944 (age 81–82); Thom Bay, Kitikmeot (Nunavut)

Maudie Rachel Okittuq (born 1944) is an Inuk sculptor known for her works in whalebone and soapstone.

Okittuq was born in Ikpik (Thom Bay), Nunavut and moved to Talurjuaq in the mid-1960s. By 1968 she was one of the first in her community to begin carving.

Her work is included in the collections of the Musée national des beaux-arts du Québec and the National Gallery of Canada

Okittiuq's work was included in Kakiniit Hivonighijotaa: Inuit Embodied Practices and Meanings, at the Winnipeg Art Gallery in 2022.
