= Lita Fontaine =

Indigenous Canadian computer artist and photographer (born 1958)

Lita Fontaine (born 1958) is an interdisciplinary artist based in Winnipeg, Manitoba. Often, her work explores the role of women in past and present Indigenous societies. She describes herself as tri-cultural: Dakota, Anishinaabe and Metis.

== Early life and education ==
Fontaine was born in Portage la Prairie, a member of Long Plain First Nation, Fontaine spent her childhood in the north end of Winnipeg. She received her Diploma from the University of Manitoba School of Art in 2000 and her MFA from what is now the First Nations University of Canada in Regina in 2005.

She was a sessional instructor for the University of Manitoba’s School of Art, teaching Foundation Drawing.

Her sister, Leah Fontaine, is also an interdisciplinary artist and arts Educator.

== Artwork ==
For many years, Fontaine's studio practice has included community art projects and other involvement, such as mask-making. In 2013, Sarah Swan wrote in the Winnipeg Free Press, "Lita Fontaine makes beautiful multimedia pieces using traditional designs from her Anishnaabe and Dakota heritage".

Fontaine has had solo exhibitions at the Winnipeg Art Gallery in 2001, and Urban Shaman Gallery in 2013 and 2006. In 2015, her work was in the Winnipeg At Gallery's We Are On Treaty Land exhibition. In 2025, her work was again in a solo exhibition at the Winnipeg Art Gallery in a show titled Winyan: Lita Fontaine.

Since 2002, Fontaine has been artist-in-residence for the Seven Oaks School Division. She incorporates art experiences into the curriculum and the lives of students. In 2015, Melanie Wright wrote for the Winnipeg Free Press, "Some recent additions to their programming include … the creation of a giant mural at their headquarters titled 'We Are All Treaty People' under the guidance of Lita Fontaine (acclaimed artist-in-residence with the Seven Oaks School Division)…"

Fontaine was a mentor in the Foundation Advisory Program of Mentoring Artists for Women's Art in 2009.

In 2008, Fontaine gave Lucy Lippard a guided tour of the Whiteshell petroforms, when Lippard was in Winnipeg to give her Wendy Wersch Memorial Lecture Series.
