= Kamila Wozniakowska =

Polish-Canadian painter (born 1956)

- Born: 18 July 1956 (age 70); Warsaw, Poland
- Known for: Painter, graphic artist

Kamila Wozniakowska RCA (born 18 July 1956) is a Polish-Canadian postwar and contemporary painter whose work "blends the narrative aspects of 18th century engravings, appropriation art techniques, and repetition."

== Early life and studies ==
Wozniakowska was born in Warsaw, Poland on 18 July 1956. She studied painting in France before emigrating to Montreal, Quebec, Canada. After emigrated to Canada, she graduated from Université du Québec in Montreal obtaining the degree of Baccalauréat en arts plastiques under Prof Raymond Lavoie in 1986 and Maîtrise en arts plastiques under Prof. Louise Poissant in 1996.

Her art is primarily influenced by the 1970s.

== Art career ==
Wozniakowska was commissioned in the late 1990s to decorate the theatre of the new Maison Théâtre in Montreal. Wozniakowska's work in the theatre "reunites the traditional with the modern."

In 2007, Wozniakowska was inducted into the Royal Canadian Academy of Arts.

== Styles and influences ==
Wozniakowska's paintings focus on themes of communication and human relationships, and examine how narratives and images are transmitted and interpreted over time. The scenes often incorporate humor and allow for multiple interpretations, exploring the difference between lived experience and how it is later recorded and remembered.

== Collections ==
Wozniakowska's 1996 painting The Changing of the Guard is currently held in the permanent collection of the Musée national des beaux-arts du Québec in Quebec.

Wozniakowska's 2010 painting Jenny and 2009 painting Katechizm rewolucjonisty (Revolutionary's Catechism) are also currently held in the permanent collection of the Galeria Bielska in Bielsko-Biała, Poland.

In 2011, Concordia University commissioned Wozniakowska to create the piece Acer Concordia, a series of 26 metal panels engraved with maple trees. These panels are located in the Guy–Concordia metro station. These panels are supposed to represent "the university’s growth from fragile sapling to a strong, vibrant part of the city’s landscape."

== Exhibitions ==
2004 - Kamila Wozniakowska: Le monde comme il va at Musée d'art contemporain de Montréal

2012 - Weird Science at Richard Levy Gallery
