= Susan Dobson =

Canadian artist (born 1965)

- Born: 1965 (age 60–61); Moncton, New Brunswick, Canada
- Education: Ryerson University, University of Guelph
- Known for: photographer
- Website: susandobson.com

Susan Dobson (born September 19, 1965) is a Canadian artist based in Guelph, Ontario. She is best known for her photographs and installations, many focusing on the theme of urban landscape and suburban culture.

According to the artist: "If you have driven through the streets of most suburbs, you have seen the row houses of equivalent design, decoration, and setback. Such standardization seems depressing to you, but the important thing is that it seems even more depressing to the suburbanite. As a consequence, an enormous amount of effort has been spent by suburbanites to make their homes different from those on either side and across the street. The more identical things are, the more he seeks some distinctive touch to symbolize and validate any particular tract house as his house."

Dobson's work has been exhibited worldwide, in countries including: Canada, the United States, the United Kingdom, Belgium, China, Germany, Spain, and Mexico. She was a contributing artist to the Vancouver 2010 Cultural Olympiad and her work was presented on billboards in Vancouver as part of the exhibition Endlessly Traversed Landscapes.

== Biography ==
Susan Dobson was born in Moncton, New Brunswick, on September 19, 1965. She spent her early years in Canada, eventually moving to Germany due to her father's career change from a land developer to an Opera singer. Although growing up in Germany, she spent summers in Nova Scotia visiting her grandfather. Dobson developed interest in photography when she took her first image at age of 9 or 10 with her mother's Brownie camera. It was a photograph of a poinsettia plant on a windowsill which, due to lighting, appeared as a silhouette in a final print. When Dobson was a teenager, she sought career advice from a nature photographer Freeman Patterson, who provided a perspective on the challenges with pursuing arts, but also practical advice on how to approach it. Dobson pursued a Bachelor of Applied Arts at Ryerson University in Toronto, graduating in 1988, followed by an early career as an editorial photographer in multiple engagements, including Toronto Life and Saturday Night. Dobson received an M.F.A from the University of Guelph in 1997, completed under the mentorship of Suzy Lake. She has been an associate professor at the University of Guelph from 2004–present (Tenure 2006; Promotion to Associate Professor 2009).

=== Collections ===
The Canadian Museum of Contemporary Photography, an affiliate of the National Gallery of Canada

Macdonald Stewart Art Centre

Portland Art Museum

BMO Financial Group

Accenture

Art Gallery of Windsor

Frommer Lawrence, Haug, New York

Oakville Galleries

State Street Trust Company

Private Collections

=== Solo exhibitions ===
2016 Come Up to My Room, The Gladstone Hotel, a collaboration with Simone Ferkul, curated by Jana Macalik & Nuria Montblanch.

2015 Viewfinder, Orleans Campus Gallery, Ottawa School of Art, Ottawa, Ontario, Canada.

2014 Viewfinder, Michael Gibson Gallery, London, Ontario, Canada.

2012 Transmission, Cambridge Galleries, Cambridge, Ontario, Canada.

11/12 By Design, Robert McLaughlin Gallery, Oshawa, Ontario, Canada.

2010 Dislocation, The department, Toronto, Ontario, Canada.

2010 Endlessly Traversed Landscapes, a site specific billboard installation in conjunction with the Vancouver

2010 Cultural Olympiad. Organized by VANOC and curated by Natalie Doonan

2009 Retail, The department, Toronto, Ontario, Canada. A CONTACT photography festival feature exhibition.

2008 Temporary Architectures, Saint Mary's University Art Gallery, Halifax, Nova Scotia, Canada. In conjunction with the photography festival Photopolis, and with Nocturne: Art at Night.

2008 Rememory, The Macdonald Stewart Art Centre, Guelph, Ontario, Canada.

2006 Open House, Elora Centre for the Arts, Elora, Ontario, Canada.

2005 Open House, National Center for the Arts (Cenart,) Mexico City, Mexico.

2005 Open House, Fotoseptiembre

2005 Museo Universitario del Chopo, Mexico City, Mexico.

2005 Open House, Blue Sky Gallery, Portland, Oregon, USA.

2005 Susan Dobson: Interiors, The Toronto Free Gallery, Toronto, Ontario, Canada. Contact Photography Festival feature exhibition.

2004/05 Open House, Art Gallery of Calgary, Alberta, Canada.

2004 Open House, SRO Photo Gallery, Texas Tech University, Lubbock, Texas, USA.

2004 Open House, Tatar Gallery, Toronto, Ontario, Canada.

2004 No Fixed Address, Gallery 44 Project Room, Toronto, Ontario, Canada.

2002/03 Sprawl, Centennial Gallery, Oakville, Ontario, Canada.

2001 Natural Law, Tatar Alexander Gallery, Toronto, Ontario, Canada.

2000 Home Invasion, Justina Barnicke Gallery, Toronto, Ontario, Canada.

2000 Home Invasion, Artspace, Peterborough, Ontario, Canada.

2000 Home Invasion, The Photographers Gallery, Saskatoon, Saskatchewan, Canada.

2000 Vanishing Point, The Floating Gallery Centre for Photography, Winnipeg, Manitoba, Canada.

1999 Home Invasion, Struts Gallery, Sackville, New Brunswick, Canada.

1999 Lots 16–23, The Redhead Gallery Showcase, Toronto, Ontario, Canada.

1999 Home Invasion, Propeller Centre for the Visual Arts, Toronto, Ontario, Canada.

1997 Vanishing Point, New York State University, Buffalo, New York, USA.

1997 Vanishing Point, Zavitz Hall Gallery, Guelph University, Guelph, Ontario, Canada

=== Awards ===
1996 The Margaret Craig Memorial Scholarship, The University of Guelph. Board of Graduate Studies Research Scholarship, The University of Guelph. 1991 Gold National Magazine Award, Category: Photojournalism.

1997 Best of Show, Crossing Borders (Juror: Cheryl Brutvan, Senior Curator, The Albright Knox Art Gallery), Castellani Art Museum. The Margaret Craig Memorial Scholarship, The University of Guelph. The Delpha Award, The University of Guelph.

2001 Gold National Magazine Award, Category: Urban and Natural Landscapes. The Advertising & Design Club of Canada Silver Award, Category: Photojournalism. 1998 K.M. Hunter Emerging Artist Award for Visual Arts, Ontario Arts Council.

2006 Award of Distinction, The International Colour Awards.
