= Lucille Oille =

Canadian artist

Lucille Oille (1912–1997) was a Canadian sculptor, wood engraver, and book illustrator born in Toronto, Ontario. She studied with Emanuel Hahn at the Ontario College of Art and then attended the Royal College of Art in London, England.

Her sculpture was exhibited at the Ontario Society of Artists and the Royal Canadian Academy in the 1930s and early 1940s. However, after her marriage to journalist Kenneth McNeill Wells, she devoted most of her time to the wood engraved illustration of his (and other's) books.

In the early 1940s, Wells and Oille decided to leave Toronto and find a rural home. After searching the back roads of Simcoe County and its Medonte township, with a limited budget, they decided to salvage the timbers from an old log home and re-assemble it on a few acres of land purchased from a local farmer. While he wrote of the often humorous exploits of transplanted city folk for the Toronto Telegram newspaper, she began a series of wood engravings that were used in the hardcover collection of the articles known as The Owl Pen. This book, which went through many editions, was followed by four others written by Wells and illustrated by Oille, including The Moonstruck Two, a book about their trip down the Mississippi.

As time passed in her career as a book illustrator, Oille began using scraperboard and linocut as being just as effective for illustration as the more demanding wood engraving.

In the 1960s, the couple moved to Virginia for 18 years and then to The Bahamas. It appears that during this time away from Canada, Oille did not continue her art in any way and she was virtually forgotten in Canada despite the continued popularity of The Owl Pen. After Wells' death she returned to Canada in the early 1990s, living in Orillia, Ontario, very near her ancestral roots and the countryside of The Owl Pen. She is buried in the family plot in Elgin County.

== Bibliography ==
Books Illustrated by Lucille Oille include:

- Wells, Kenneth, The Owl Pen, 1947
- McArthur, Peter In Pastures Green, 1948
- Wells, Kenneth, By Moonstone Creek, 1949
- Morgan, Joan, Castle Quebec, 1949
- Wells, Kenneth, Up Medonte Way, 1951
- Morrison, George, Country Parson, 1953
- Wells, Kenneth, By Jumping Cat Bridge, 1956
- Wells, Kenneth, The Moonstruck Two, c 1964

== Sources ==
Some of the material in this article is taken from an article in The Devil's Artisan, A Journal of the Printing Arts, Number 32, 1993
