= Tracey Neuls =

Tracey Neuls is a Canadian shoe designer, founder of TN29 and the eponymous Tracey Neuls labels. Neuls produced her first commercial collection in 2000 after winning the New Generation Prize at London Fashion Week.

Neuls has a flagship store in Marylebone Lane, London – listed in 2012 as one of Time Out's London Top 100. This was followed by stores in Redchurch Street and Coal Drops Yard, which formed part of the brand’s retail journey between 2011 and 2020, and 2018 and 2023, respectively.

== Career ==
Neuls is from Vancouver Island. She moved to London, England to study at Cordwainer's College. Neuls was shortlisted for the Drapers Footwear and Accessories Award 2013 (Footwear Designer of the Year category) and in 2012 was named one of the Time Out/The Hospital Club's Culture 100. In 2014, her BIKE GEEK design was short listed as one of the Design Museum's Designs of the Year

Shoes designed by Neuls are referenced in the Peter James novel Dead Like You and the Judy Astley novel The Look of Love.

== Collaborations ==
Neuls has collaborated with many creative individuals and groups over the past 15 years.

- Morag Myerscough
- Tokyobike
- Art Car Boot Fair
- Tord Boontje
- Fabergé Big Egg Hunt
- LE GUN
- Faudet-Harrison
- The Museum Of Everything
- Nicola Yeoman
- Nina Saunders & Sanderson
- Moroso
- Tim Ellis
- Design Is Simply Complex
- The Wapping Project
- Brompton Shop & Show
- Elaine Avila
- Retrouvius
- Boo Ritson
