= Susan McEachern =

American/Canadian photographer

- Born: April 7, 1951 (age 75); Wausau, Wisconsin, United States of America
- Education: Hamline University; Banff Centre; Ontario Institute for Studies in Education
- Website: http://www.susanmceachern.ca/

Susan McEachern (born April 7, 1951) is an American/Canadian artist. McEachern is best known for her photography, which frequently includes text. Her work follows the feminist idea of "the personal is political," as she often combines images of her own life and personal space to investigate and comment on themes of socialization, gender, sexuality, and the natural world. McEachern has also been a professor at the Nova Scotia College of Art and Design University since 1979.

== Education ==
McEachern received a BA in Theatre from Hamline University in St. Paul, Minnesota, a Visual Communication/Photography diploma from the Banff Centre in Alberta and a Master of Arts in Sociology in Education in Feminist Studies and Gender Relations from the Ontario Institute for Studies in Education.

== Early works ==
Some of McEachern's early works include: The Home (1983), The Family in the Context of Childrearing (1983 — 1984), and On Living at Home (1987). These projects all focus on the domestic domain.

On Living at Home is a four-part photographic installation. Part One- AGORAPHOBIA, includes eight 16 by 20 colour photographs with text, and deals with the fear of the world outside one's home. Part Two- DOMESTIC IMMERSION includes twelve colour photographs with text that are also 16 by 20. Part Two deals with work that goes on inside the domestic sphere that is unpaid, and not seen as labour in the outside world. Part Three- MEDIA CONSUMPTION consists of fourteen photographs with text (nine of which are black and white), and looks at how the media portrays the fantasy of a "perfect housewife" and never the unpleasant realities such as domestic violence. Part Four- THE WORLD OUTSIDE, consists of seven photographs and looks at consumerism and daily life experiences.

Relating to the theme of the domestic domain, The Family in the Context of Childrearing, is another of Susan McEachern's photographic projects, which also has four main parts and nearly 150 images with added text. The first parts of the work revolve around the daily activities involved in caring for a family. McEachern's is a standard family unit with father, mother and two children. The last part of the work exhibits the writings of well-known psychologists, sociologists, historians, feminist thinkers, as well as McEachern's own personal perspective on her experiences.

Based on another of McEachern's experiences is The Creation of Desire, which has five parts: The Stories We Are Told, Stories We Tell Ourselves, Finding Our Place / Defining Difference, Fitting In and Stories We Can Tell. This body of work portrays an interaction between militarism and romance, and the gender roles that society has given to men and women in time of war.

== Later works ==
McEachern's later projects include Questions of Nature (1994), Backyard Community (2002), Structures of Meaning (2004), and her Equine studies. These works introduce nature, a new area of inquiry for McEachern.

Questions of Nature, like McEachern's earlier works is grouped in sections: "animals", "trees and water", "garden", and "reproduction". McEachern uses the word "nature" to describe the natural world around us (plants and animals), as well as our own human nature, and how these two relate to one another.

Nature is also evident in Backyard Community, through the examination of "human social structures from the point of view of the garden and the insects that live there."

McEachern's Equine studies include: Still Seeking Athena, Herbivores and Stable Community. Stable Community (2005) is part of McEachern's Equine studies that was included in her Structures of Meaning touring exhibition. It is composed of twelve close-up images of horses and their riders.

== Exhibitions ==
Susan McEachern's work has been exhibited across Canada. Starting with The Home in Montreal's Powerhouse Gallery in February 1983. From Montreal, the show travelled to Saskatchewan and ended in Toronto's Mercer Union in June 1983.

"The Family" also travelled extensively across Canada and was housed in The Toronto Photographer's Gallery in July 1986. "Creation of Desire" was, in January 1992, another of McEachern's works that was exhibited in The Toronto Photographer's Gallery.

"Questions of Nature" toured Canada and was exhibited in the Dalhousie Art Gallery in Halifax in September 1994.

One of McEachern's more environmental pieces, "Sandy Cove Outfall," was shown at the Art Gallery of Nova Scotia in September 1997.

"Structures of Meaning" was exhibited at The Canadian Museum of Contemporary Photography in Ottawa from September 2004 until January 2005. The show then went onto be shown at the Patrick Mikhail Gallery, also in Ottawa, from March to April of the same year.

McEachern's latest exhibition, "Fight/Flight," was from January to February 2011, and was presented at the Patrick Mikhail Gallery in Ottawa. "Fight/Flight" is part of Susan McEachern's ongoing Equine studies. It portrays the relationship between horse and human.

Susan McEachern has also been in group shows. Two of which are "Roots and Shoots" and "Microcosm." "Roots and Shoots" was an exhibition at the Mount Saint Vincent Gallery in Halifax, which was shown from August to September 2006. Microcosm was displayed at the Patrick Mikhail Gallery in Ottawa from September to October 2009.

== Collections ==
Susan McEachern's work is in the collection of the Art Gallery of Nova Scotia, Dalhousie Art Gallery, the Canada Council Art Bank, the Walter Phillips Gallery, the Photographers Gallery, the Nova Scotia Art Bank, Mount Saint Vincent Art Gallery, and the Canadian Museum of Contemporary Photography.

== Bibliography ==
- Simon, Cheryl (1989). The Zone of Conventional Practice and Other Real Stories. Montreal: Optica.
- Fisher-Taylor, Gail (1991). Thirteen Essays. Ottawa, Ontario: The Canadian Museum of Contemporary Photography.
- Kunard, Andrea (2004). Structures of Meaning. Canadian Museum of Contemporary Photography.
- Gibson Garvey, Susan (1994). Questions of Nature. Halifax, Nova Scotia: Dalhousie Art Gallery.
- Simon, Cheryl (1993). Domestic Subversion: Susan McEachern's On Living at Home. Banff, Alberta: The Banff Center.
- McEachern, Susan (1992). The Creation of Desire. Halifax, Nova Scotia: Eye Level Gallery.
