= Margaret Campbell Macpherson =

Canadian painter

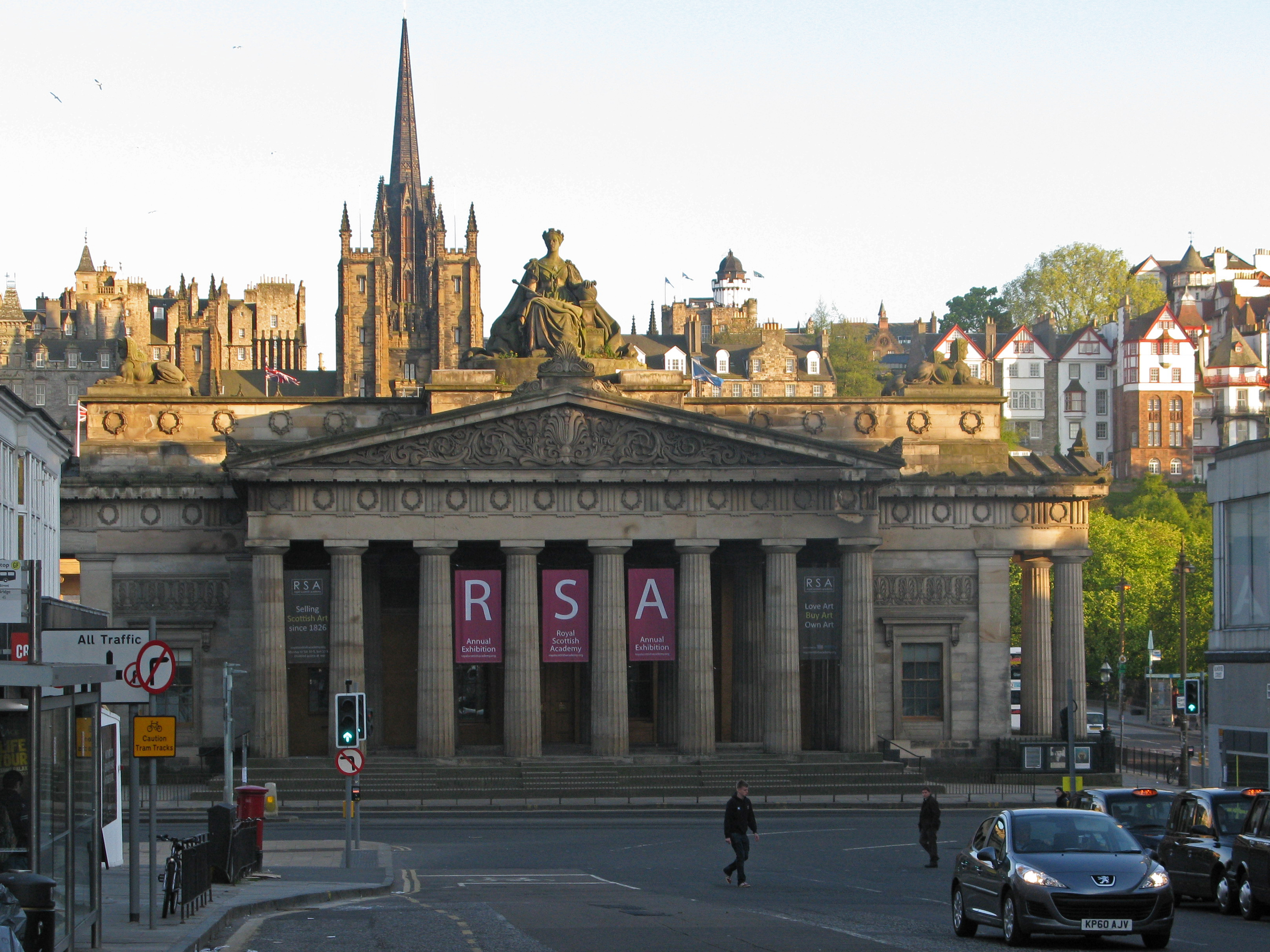
The Royal Scottish Academy, where Macpherson's work was exhibited.

Margaret Campbell Macpherson (1860 – May 16, 1931) was an artist born in St. John's, Newfoundland and Labrador. Macpherson was well known for her various works of paintings in Scotland. Macpherson later died in Versailles, France.

== Early life ==
Macpherson grew up in St John's, Newfoundland, and moved to Edinburgh to study painting.

== Career ==
Between 1880 and 1884, Macpherson studied in Switzerland, with the artist Auguste-Henri Berthoud. In 1885, she returned to Edinburgh and exhibited at the Royal Scottish Academy for the first time. Macpherson began to exhibit her work at the Glasgow Institute of the Fine Arts from 1887 onwards.

In 1884, she submitted her first work for exhibition at the Dudley Gallery in London.

In 1889, Macpherson moved to Paris. Once there, she trained with Gustave Courtois and Pascal Dagnan-Bouveret at the Academie Colarossi. Whilst in France, Macpherson also worked at the artists' colony of Concarneau during 1891, where she began to specialise in paintings of girls in traditional Breton costume.

In 1892, she was admitted as a member of the progressive Society of Scottish Artists.

Macpherson was dividing her time between France and Scotland, where she had a successful career as a portrait painter. She shared a studio in Edinburgh with another artist, Josephine Hoxie Bartlett. Macpherson and Bartlett became members of the Society of Scottish Artists in 1892. Macpherson and Bartlett had a joint exhibition in Edinburgh in 1895. They moved permanently to Paris in 1899.

Throughout her career the following art societies all accepted paintings by Macpherson

- Royal Scottish Academy
- Glasgow Institute of Fine Art
- Society of Scottish Artists
- Société Nationale des Beaux-Arts
- Royal Academy, London
- Société des Artistes Français

=== Awards ===
- Bronze medal - Exposition universelle, Paris, in 1900
- Gold medal - Exposition nationale, Reims, in 1903
- Gold medal - Exposition internationale, Nantes, in 1904
