= Chrystal Callahan =

Canadian model and television personality

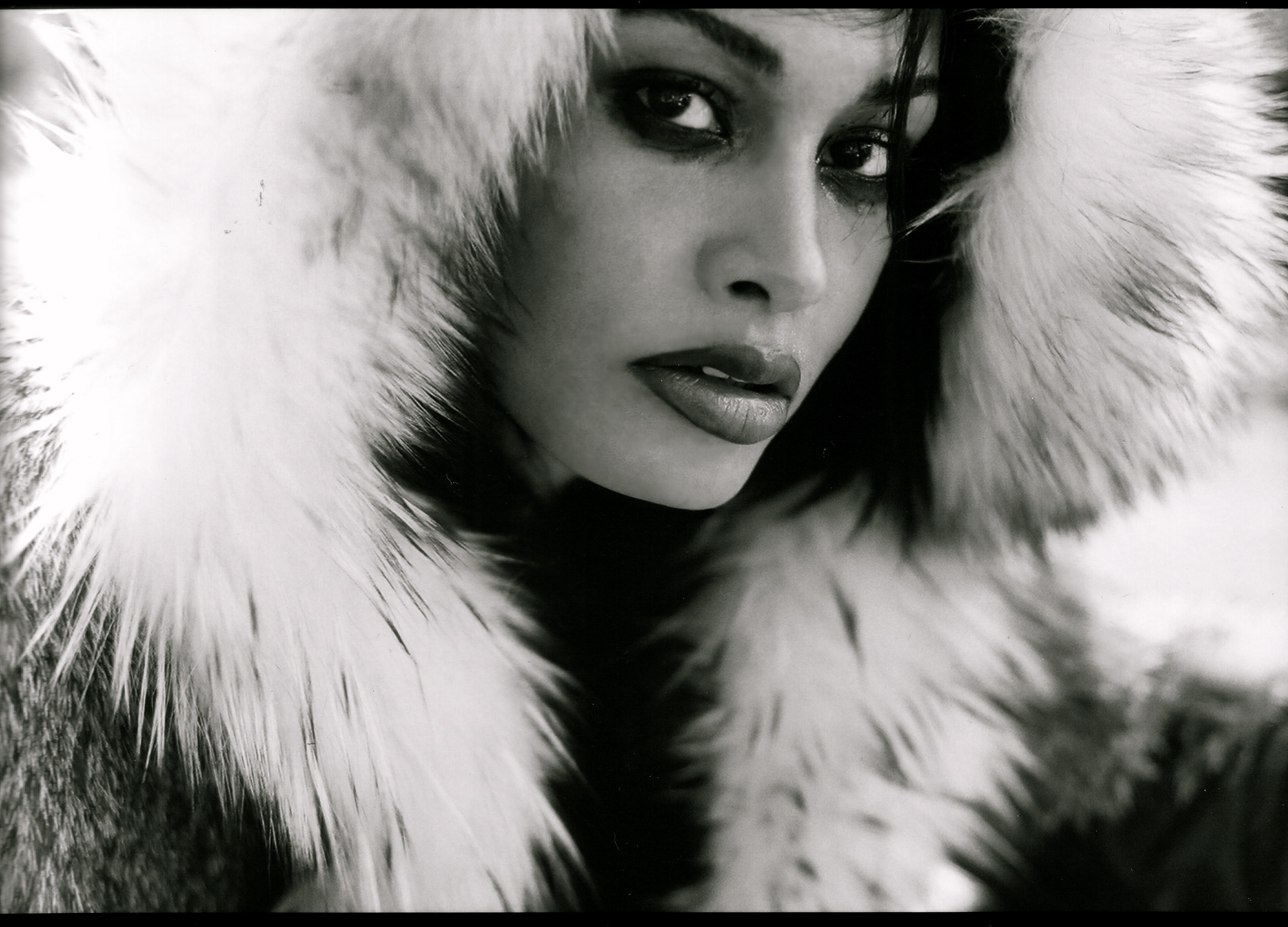
Chrystal Callahan.

Chrystal Callahan, is a Toronto-born American Canadian visual artist, photographer, journalist and fashion model.

== Career ==
In 2015, Callahan released the photo series, "The Dirty War - Selfies of Terrorism, Virtue and Covert Sexuality" which appeared in ELLE Magazine. Callahan works in series, typically photographing herself in a range of attires and props. She shoots her photos alone in her studio, embracing various roles as the subject, director, hair & make-up artist, stylist, model and photographer.

Callahan began hosting Highlights of the Week with Chrystal Callahan in June, 2009. It was a subtitled English-language television show in Russia's North Caucasus Republic of Chechnya.

In 2008, Callahan wrote, produced and directed Greco Roman Grozny, a film about three teens attempting to escape war torn Chechnya through competitive Greco Roman wrestling.

In July 2010, Callahan launched a new program called "Chechnya Through The Eyes of Chrystal Callahan". It is focused on travel / tourist destinations in the Chechen Republic, Islam and Chechen Culture.

Callahan has been dubbed the "Maverick Model". She embarked on a singing career under the stage name of KRISTALL and became a popstar in the North Caucasus. She performed songs in the Russian and Chechen language.

== Criticism and praise ==
Callahan has received criticism for her work in Chechnya. Critics view her as a supporter of pro-Russian Chechen president Ramzan Kadyrov and accuse her of being a propaganda tool for the Chechen government. Callahan has been compared to Walter Duranty, the British journalist who won a Pulitzer Prize in 1932 for a set of stories written in 1931 on the Soviet Union. CNN featured Callahan in the summer of 2010 and credited her as being a symbol of stability and peace after years of conflict in the unstable region.
