= Sheilah Wilson ReStack =

Canadian artist (born 1975)

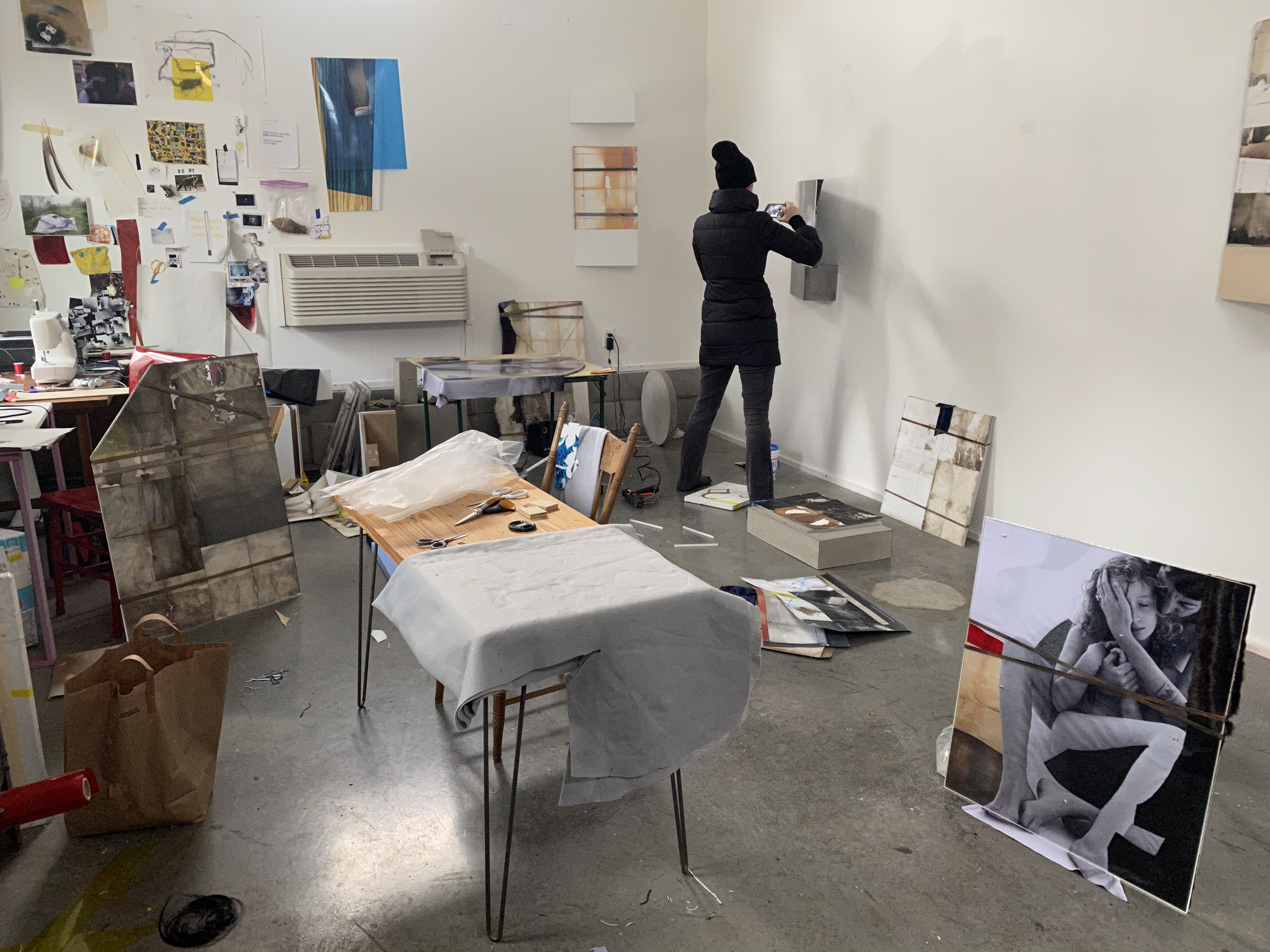
- Born: 1975 (age 50–51); Caribou River, Nova Scotia, Canada.
- Education: BFA, NSCAD University; MFA, Goldsmiths College; BA, Mount Allison University
- Known for: Photographer, installation artist, videographer and sculptor.
- Movement: Contemporary; Conceptual
- Website: sheilahwilsonrestack.com

Sheilah Wilson ReStack (born 1975 Caribou River, Nova Scotia) is a Canadian artist working in photography, sculpture, video and installation.

ReStack's work has been exhibited in solo shows at Interface Gallery ("Hold Hold Spill"), Blue Building Gallery ("Control is Cassandra"), and the Camden Centre for the Arts ("Cuts in the Day," a collaboration with Dani ReStack). These exhibitions have been reviewed positively in a variety of publications, including Artforum and Bomb Magazine.

== Biography ==
ReStack was born in 1975 in Caribou River, Nova Scotia. She graduated from Mount Allison University with a BA in English/French and NSCAD University with her BFA. ReStack then went on to complete her MFA at Goldsmiths College. ReStack teaches and is Chair of Studio Art at Denison University.

ReStack also works collaboratively with her wife Dani (Leventhal) ReStack. Dani ReStack is an American photographer whose work has been recognized with numerous grants and awards, including the Howard Foundation Fellowship in Photography in 2017. They have received funding from the Canada Council for the Arts, and have been recognized by Judy Flower's Through the Flower Foundation and the Ohio Arts Council Individual Excellence in Photography. In 2017 Dani and Sheilah ReStack's film Strangely Ordinary This Devotion was included in the Whitney Biennial.

Sheilah and Dani ReStack collaborated on a trilogy of films – "Strangely Ordinary This Devotion," "Come Coyote," and "Future From Inside"—that are collectively titled "Feral Domestic." The films were screened at various film festivals and art institutions and received positive critical attention. In an essay for the Camden Arts Centre, Maggie Nelson praised the films for their exploration of queer families and their attention to the everyday details of domestic life. A visual text accompanying the trilogy, also titled "Feral Domestic," was commissioned by the Visual Studies Workshop in Rochester, New York, and published in the fall of 2022.

== Solo exhibitions ==
- 2022: Control is Cassandra at The Blue Building Gallery, Halifax, Nova Scotia.
- Macaskill, Annick (2020). Text, Image, and Disruption in Sheliah Restack's Control is Cassandra (PDF). Visual Arts News.

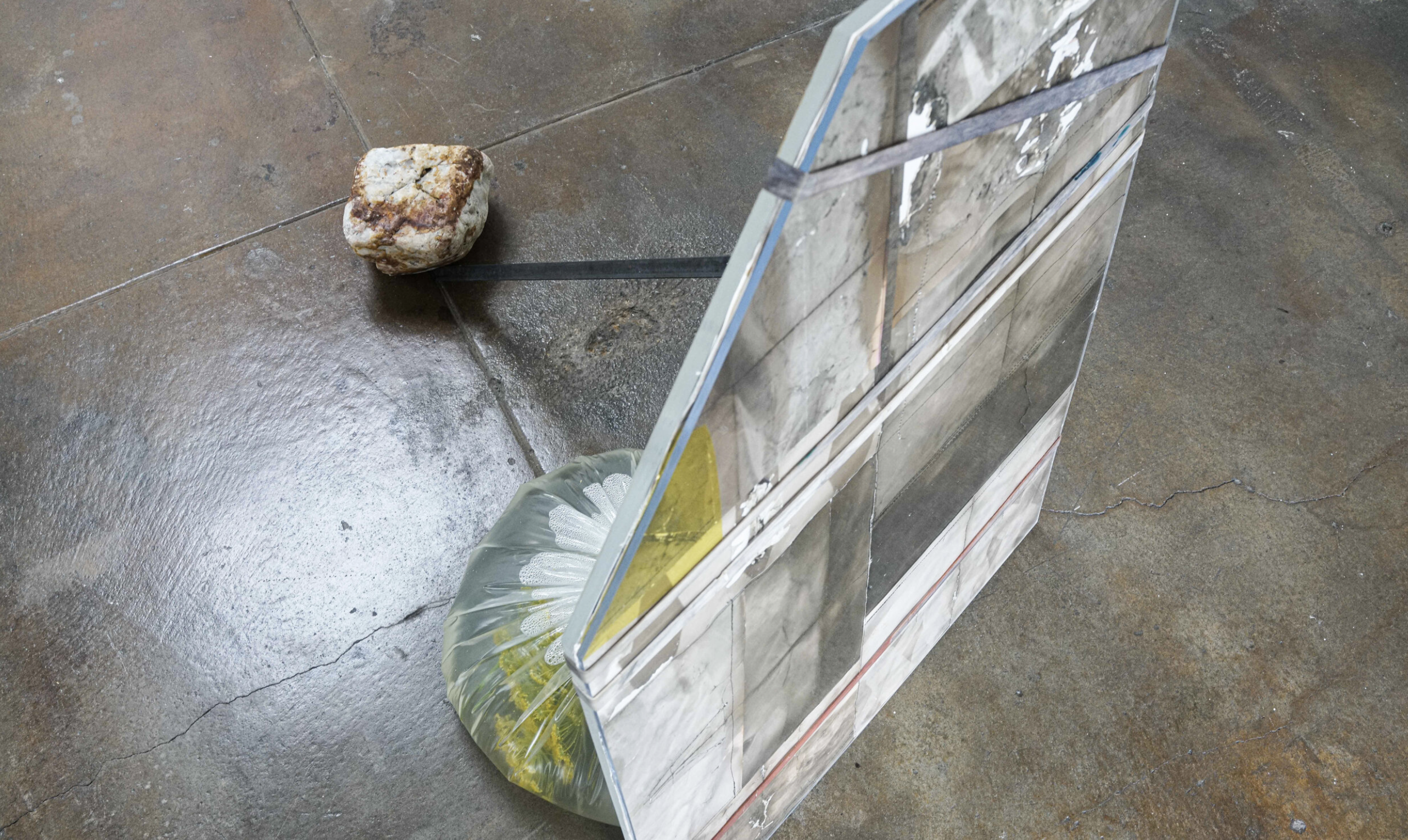
Hold House, Hold Hold Spill at Interface Gallery

- 2020: Hold Hold Spill at Interface Gallery, Oakland, California.
- 2014: If Becoming This at Antioch College, Yellow Springs, Ohio.
- 2013: Build Your Altar at Enjoy Gallery, Wellington, New Zealand.

== Exhibitions (in collaboration with Dani ReStack) ==
- 2022: Cuts in the Day at Camden Art Centre, London, United Kingdom.
- 2018: House Becomes You at GAA Gallery, Provincetown, Massachusetts.
- 2017: Stack for Carrington's Hyena at Iceberg Projects, Chicago.

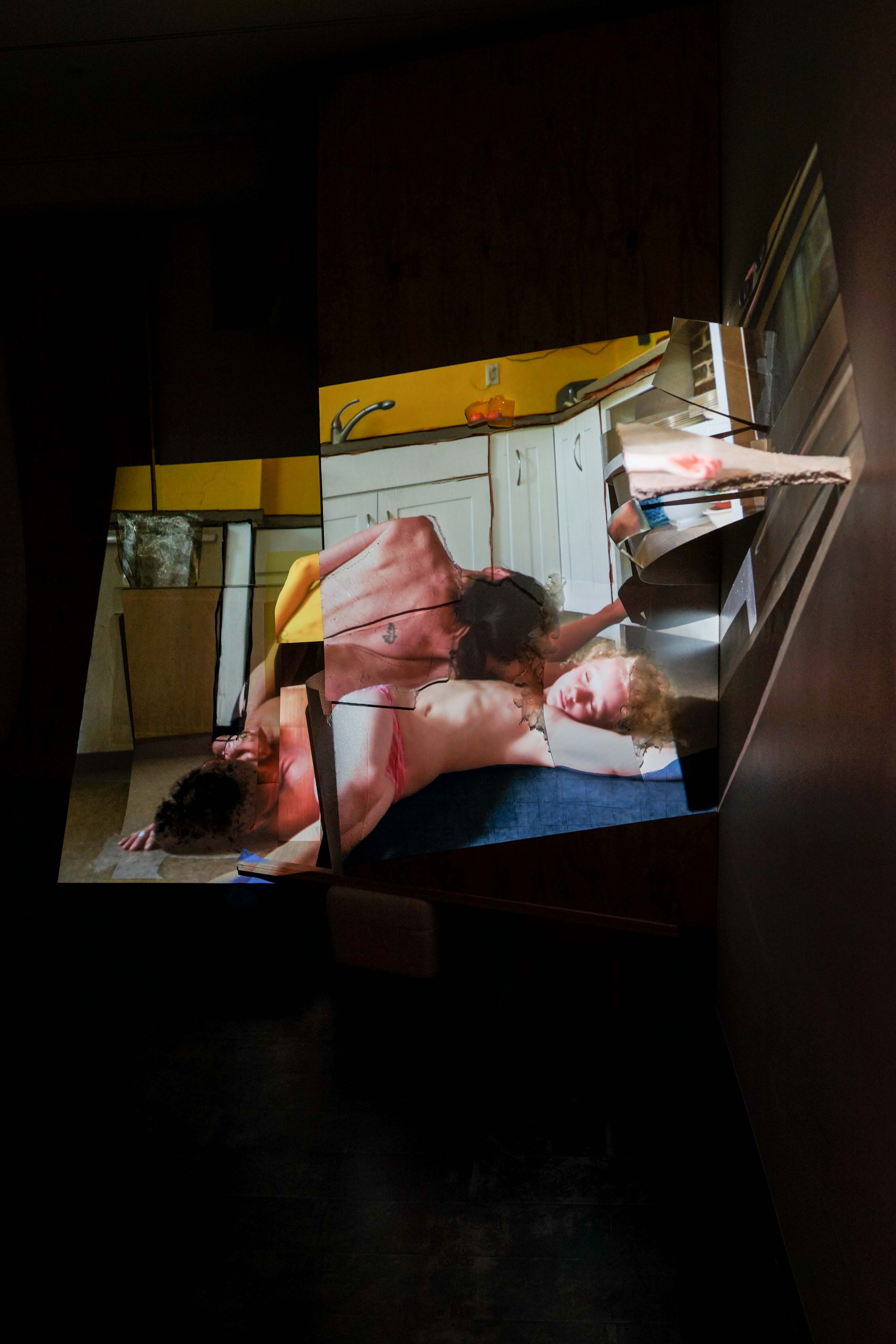
Stack for Carrington's Hyena, Iceberg Projects, 2018 with Dani ReStack

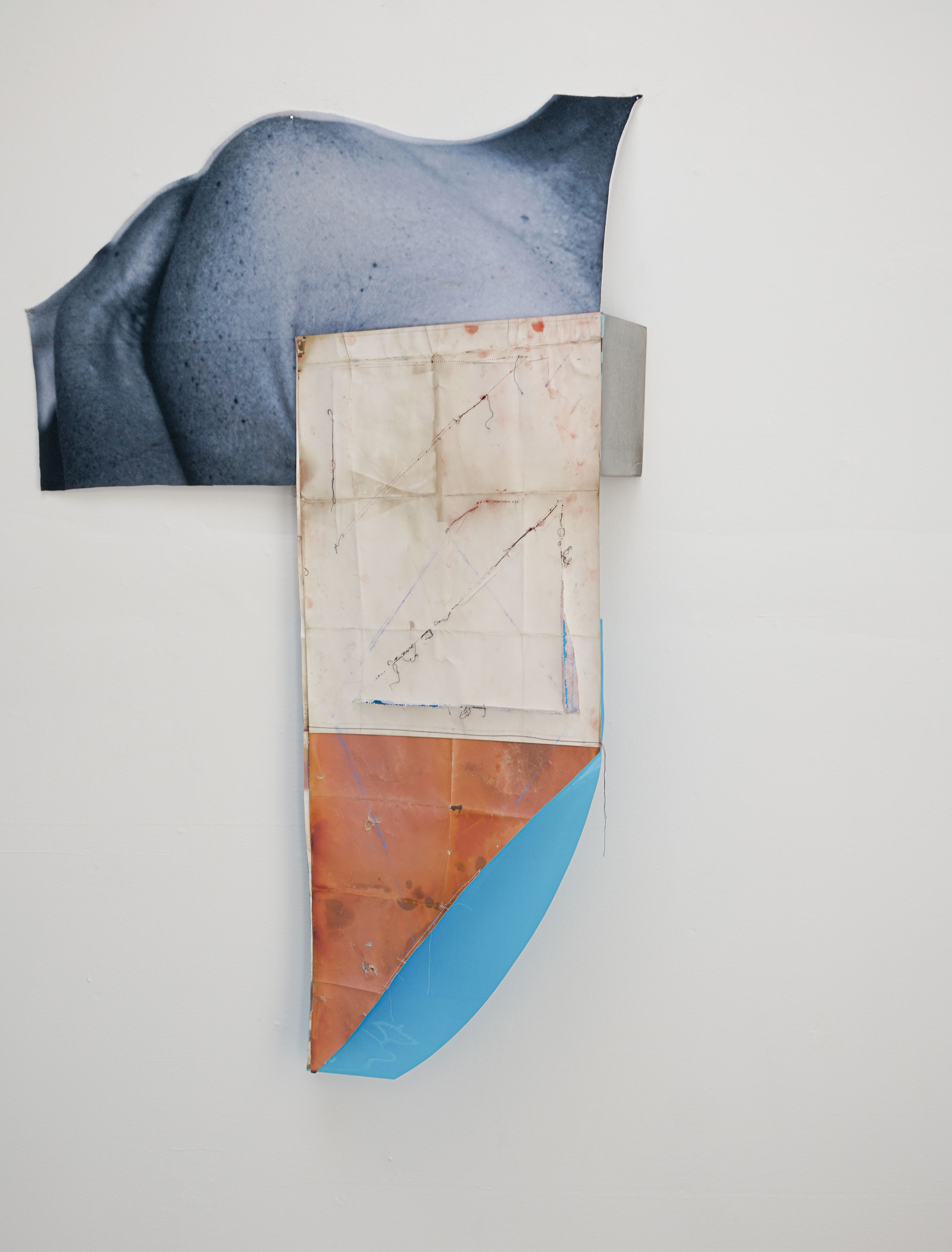
Rabbit, cement wedge, felt blanket, walking prints, thread, acetate, 2020

== Performance ==
- 2012: The Invisible inside the Visible in a rural Nova Scotian community.

== Filmography (in collaboration with Dani ReStack) ==
- 2022: The Sky's in There (00:11:24min)
- 2021: Future From Inside (23:59min)
- 2019: Come Coyote (7min)
- 2019: Go Ask Joan
- 2018: A Hand in Two Ways; Fisted
- 2017: Strangely Ordinary This Devotion
