= Malorie Urbanovitch =

Canadian fashion designer

- Born: 1987 (age 38–39)
- Occupation: Fashion designer
- Known for: Practical clothing with an ethical approach
- Website: urbanovitch.co

Malorie Urbanovitch (born 1987) is a Canadian fashion designer from Edmonton, Alberta known for her ethically conscious clothing, a pared-down aesthetic and utilitarian designs. In 2017, The Globe and Mail called her one of Canada's top new designers.

== Education ==
Urbanovitch graduated in film studies from the University of Alberta. While at school, she made clothes on the side for fun. After participating in a local runway show on a whim, she was prompted to take fashion more seriously. At her second show in Calgary, she won an award which led to her first collection being presented in Toronto.

== Career ==
Urbanovitch launched her namesake clothing line in 2012 which included knitted sweaters, hand painted pieces and 3D printed accessories. Since then, she has presented her collections several times at World MasterCard Fashion Week in Toronto, where she won the Mercedes-Benz Start Up award in 2013. In 2015, she was nominated for an emerging designer prize at the Canadian Arts and Fashion Awards. Her 2016 collection was described as "... one of her best as she brought vintage inspired looks with contemporary cuts to the runway using a northern winter inspired color palette mixed in with the chic allure of 1980s Industrialism."

Urbanovitch regularly works as a stylist at the Fashion with Compassion fund raising event, where she approached buyers from Simons about stocking her line. Since 2015, her clothing can be found at the Canadian department store.

Concerned about animal rights, Urbanovitch chose ethnically sourced angora from Nova Scotia for her 2014 collection, as opposed to China where the rabbits are mistreated. Being a feminist, she has selected non-conventional models for her runway shows and also aims to make clothing that is utilitarian, thereby comfortable for women to wear.
