= Millie Gamble =

Canadian photographer

- Born: December 17, 1887; Cascumpec, Prince Edward Island
- Died: December 13, 1986 (aged 98)
- Known for: photographer

Millie Gamble (1887–1986) was an amateur photographer from Prince Edward Island, Canada. Her photographs from 1905 to 1920 record life in the Tyron area.

== Biography ==
Gamble was born in Cascumpec, Prince Edward Island on January 17, 1887. She worked as a school teacher in North Bedeque from 1905 to 1906 and in Tryon from 1907 to 1919 before leaving for Winnipeg to study nursing. After graduating from the Winnipeg General Hospital in 1922 she returned to Prince Edward Island where she worked as a nurse in Tyron until retiring in 1949.

Gamble was given a Ray No. 1 camera in 1904 while visiting her uncle in Truro, Nova Scotia. Part of Prince Edward Island's first generation of amateur photographers, she took well-composed images of the Tryon area which record the way of life of the period. Rather than the stiffly posed images of earlier photographers, her shots depicted more natural scenes of people and places. Her work was first shown in 1983 by the Regional Art Gallery in London, Ontario as part of an exhibition titled Rediscovering Canadian Women Photographers, 1841-1941. More recently, they have been exhibited by the Confederation Centre Art Gallery in Charlottetown.

Millie Gamble's photographs are held in the Public Archives and Records Office, Prince Edward Island, the National Gallery of Canada Archives, and Library and Archives Canada.

In 2016 a portion of the former Trans-Canada Highway in Tyron was renamed Millie Gamble Road.
