= Nicotye Samayualie =

Inuk artist (born 1983)

- Born: 1983 (age 42–43); Kinngait, Nunavut

Nicotye Samayualie (born 1983) is a Canadian Inuk artist from Cape Dorset, Nunavut. Samayualie specializes in drawings of still lifes and landscapes. She often uses large-format drawings to create expansive images of Cape Dorset landscapes.

== Early life ==
Samayualie was born in 1983 in Cape Dorset, Northwest Territories, also known as Kinngait, Nunavut. Her parents are Kudluajuk Ashoona and Johnny Tunnillie Samayualie. Her sister Padloo Samayualie is also an artist. She is the cousin of artist Annie Pootoogook (1969–2016). Her grandmother, Keeleemeeoomee Samayualie (1919–1983), was also a graphic artist.

== Art career ==
Samayualie began developing her artistic practice in her early twenties. She is particularly interested in Cape Dorset landscapes and in mundane day-to-day objects such as buttons, pantry shelves, and camping equipment.

Her work has been displayed by public galleries including the Art Gallery of Ontario (Toronto, Ontario) and the National Gallery of Canada (Ottawa, Ontario). Her first group show was "A New Perspective" at Feheley Fine Arts in Toronto, Ontario in 2011, and she had her first solo exhibition, "Nicotye Samayualie," in February 2015, also at Feheley Fine Arts.

In 2014, she was an invited artist at the Great Northern Arts Festival in Inuvik. In 2016, she was selected for a residency at the Banff Centre as part of the TD Bank's Cape Dorset North-South artist exchange program.

== Collections ==
Her work is included in the collections of the National Gallery of Canada, the Winnipeg Art Gallery, and the University of Michigan Museum of Art.

== Exhibitions ==
- 2019: Kinngait Studios Returns, Highpoint Center for Printmaking
- 2019: Tavvauna / Here It Is: Drawings from Cape Dorset, Studio 22 (Kingston, ON)
- 2018: Toronto International Art Fair, Metro Toronto Convention Centre (Toronto, ON)
- 2018: Toronto Art Fair, Feheley Fine Arts (Toronto, ON)
- 2018: The Samayualie Sisters, Feheley Fine Arts (Toronto, ON)
- 2017: Nuit Blanche: Dorset Scenes, 401 Richmond (Toronto, ON)
- 2017: New Drawings: Kudluajuk Ashoona, Padloo Samayualie and Nicotye Samayualie, The Inuit Gallery of Vancouver (Vancouver, BC)
- 2016: Culture Shift: Challenging Identity, La Guilde
- 2016: The Change Makers, Art Gallery of Mississauga (Mississauga, ON)
- 2015: Nicotye Samayualie, Feheley Fine Arts (Toronto, ON)
- 2015: Plants, Objects, Landscapes: Drawings by Nicotye Samayualie, Marion Scott Gallery
- 2013: The Hand of the Artist, Feheley Fine Arts (Toronto, ON)
- 2013: Eight Women, Marion Scott Gallery
- 2012: The Unexpected, Feheley Fine Arts (Toronto, ON)
- 2012: Views from the North: Original Drawings from Cape Dorset, Alaska on Madison
