= Amelia Alcock-White =

Canadian artist (born 1981)

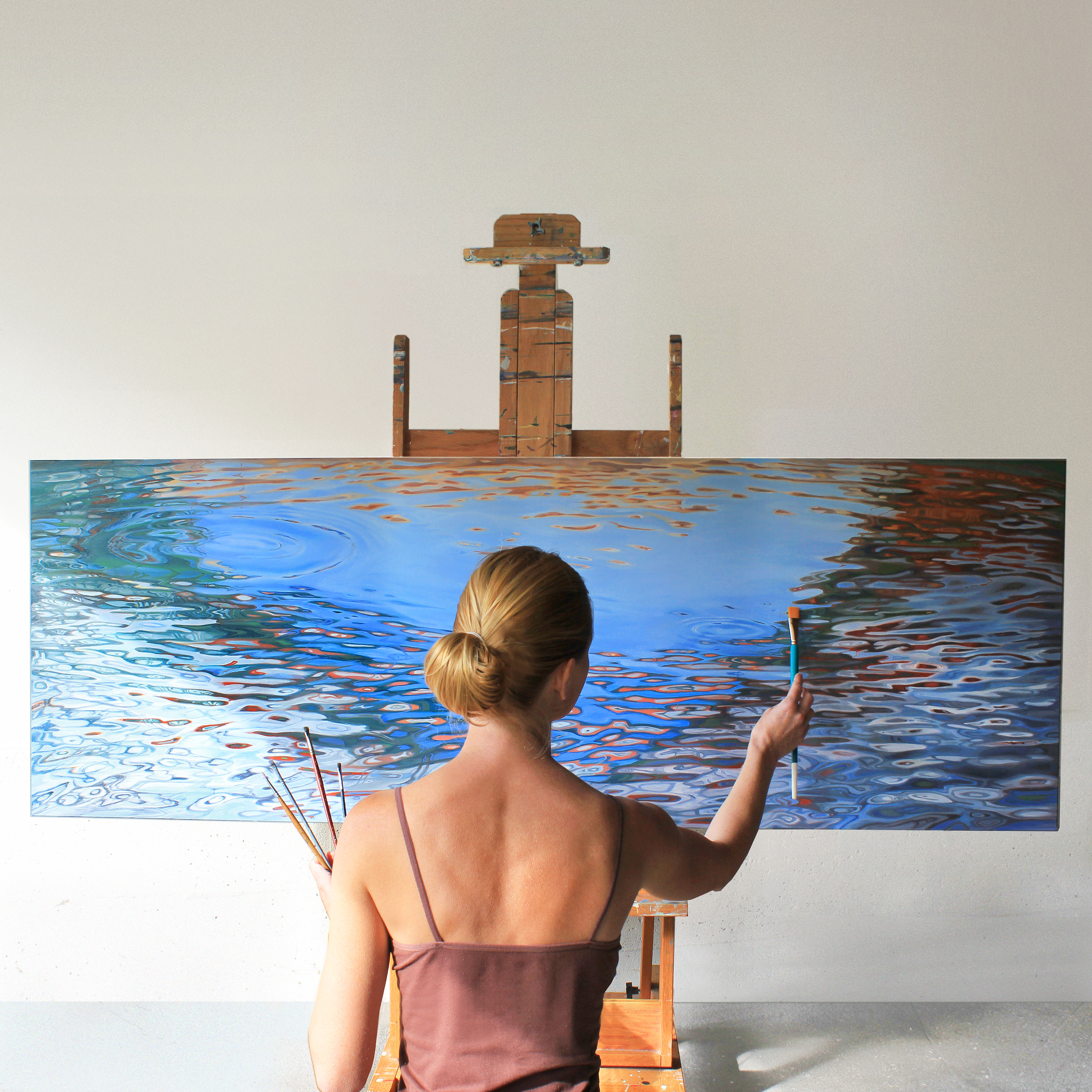
- Amelia Alcock-White Canadian Visual Artist, painting "Rip Point" 2022.
- Born: 1981 (age 44–45); Vancouver Island, British Columbia, Canada
- Known for: Painter
- Movement: Realism; Naturalism
- Website: ameliawhite.net

Amelia Alcock-White (born 1981) is a Canadian artist based in Vancouver.

== Career ==
Alcock-White studied fine art at Vancouver Island University, Emily Carr University of Art and Design and with American Realist painter Bo Bartlett in Columbus, Georgia. She is known for her oil paintings depicting water, myths, philosophy, and the British Columbia Coast.

Her work has been described as a "passionate collection of paintings that explore rebirth, identity, history, and humanity's origins." Her work is "characterized by an elegant balance between mythical and realistic imagery. The tightly woven, reflective waters of her canvases are overlaid with figurative narratives and the result is a body of work that is both beautiful and, at times, haunting." Her style has also been described as a combination of representationalism, realism and naturalism, and "takes the form of illustrational depictions of happiness using stylized, personal exaggerations and distortions...an ideal romantic world in which she is both instigator and willing participant." Her work has been published in a catalogue showcasing her paintings. In a 2016 curatorial essay Laura Schneider wrote, "Alcock-White's work uses water almost exclusively as a metaphorical backdrop for human experience. It is a thematic device through which the artist articulates her personal and spiritual journey and explores her relationships with place, family and the environment. Water is the universal bond, connecting us with ourselves, each other and the natural world in the artist's images of hope for transformation and renewal."

Alcock-White has appeared on CBC National Radio and television, Urban Rush. Her work has been discussed and reviewed in The Globe and Mail, Western Living, Juxtapoz Art & Culture Magazine, Galleries West., Notable Magazine., Canadian Art, Empty Kingdom, Hyperallergic, The Commentary, Installation Magazine, Hot Art Wet City. Creative Boom. An Artist Monograph was published in 2016 by The Reach Gallery Museum,

Alcock-White's work is found in many collections and has been exhibited internationally and across Canada including in the Vancouver Art Gallery, and the Canada Council Art Bank. Solo exhibitions include Opener, Simon Patrich Gallery 2004, The Art of Staying Afloat, Gallery O Contemporary 2007, Water Born, Petley Jones Gallery 2012 Accompanied with the limited edition publication, Water Born, Solitudes Petley Jones Gallery 2014, a public art museum with The Ripple Effect, The Reach Gallery Museum 2016. Art in Action 2019, Petley Jones Gallery, Slip Stream 2020, Petley Jones Gallery. Her work has been included in group exhibitions in Los Angeles, San Francisco, Toronto, and New York and featured in Identity, TEDx Vancouver Art Exhibition Alcock-White was awarded an artist-in-residence at the Pouch Cove Foundation, and exhibition Water at the James Baird Gallery (St John's, Newfoundland) 2022.

Alcock-White donates art to non-profit organizations including Shanti Uganda, Vancouver Aquarium, Art for life, the David Suzuki Foundation, The Yellow Point Ecological Society and Our Living Waters. A recent project is "Painting for Change", an art campaign for ocean conservation. Alcock-White is represented by the Petley Jones Gallery in Vancouver.
