= Edith Grace Coombs =

Canadian artist (1890–1986)

- Born: Edith Grace Coombs; 1890; Hamilton
- Died: 1986
- Known for: artist, educator
- Spouse: James Sharp Lawson (m. 1942)

Edith Grace Coombs (1890–1986) was a Canadian artist and educator.

== Career ==
Coombs was born in Hamilton and then moved with her family to St. Catharines. She studied painting in Gananoque and then studied at the Ontario College of Art from 1913 to 1918. Coombs became an assistant instructor at the College. She continued her studies at the New York School of Fine and Applied Arts. She taught art at Edgehill College in Windsor, Nova Scotia, at Havergal College in Toronto from 1919 to 1921 and at the Ontario College of Art from 1921 to 1956.

She designed stained glass windows for a church in Guelph. She illustrated several books including The Rambles of a Canadian Naturalist by T.S. Woods and The Brave Little People by Dorothy Campbell.

Coombs was a member of the Ontario Society of Artists, of the Canadian Society of Graphic Art, of the Federation of Canadian Artists, of the Three Arts Club of New York, of the Heliconian Club and of the Lyceum Women's Art Association. She took part in exhibitions with the Ontario Society of Artists, with the Canadian Society of Painters in Water Colour, at the National Gallery of Canada, at the Canadian National Exhibition and with the Art Association of Montreal, among others. She produced works in oil, watercolour, pastel, charcoal, pencil and ink. Her art is included in the collections of the Art Gallery of Hamilton, the Canadian Museum of Civilization, the Macdonald-Stewart Art Centre and the University of Guelph.

In 1942, she married James Sharp Lawson.

Coombs died in St. Catharines in 1986.

== Archives ==
There is a Edith Grace Coombs fonds at Library and Archives Canada. The archival reference number is R12549. The fonds covers the date rage ca. 1839 to 2005. It contains 0.58 metres of textual records in addition to a number of media records (including watercolours and drawings). The records relate to the following series: personal material; art records; professional records; publicity and promotional material; resource and reference material; and, photographic records.
