= Kelly McCallum =

Canadian artist

- Born: 1979 (age 46–47); Toronto, Ontario
- Education: Rhode Island School of Design, Royal College of Art
- Known for: Contemporary artist, taxidermist, sculptor, jewelry maker

Kelly McCallum (born 1979) is a London-based Canadian artist specializing in taxidermy, metalsmith and jewelry making.

== Early life and education ==
At a very young age Kelly used to go on school trips to Norman Elder's house and view his collection. It was there that she began to appreciate the art of taxidermy. Beginning her own art studies with a Bachelor of Fine Arts from Rhode Island School of Design (RISD) culminating in 2001, she moved on to study Animal Science, Pre Veterinarian at the University of Massachusetts Amherst for a year. Immediately following Kelly went back to RISD for additional studio work as a Metalsmith. From 2004 to 2006 Kelly studied at the Royal College of Art in London, England to earn her Master of Arts Degree.

== Inspiration ==
Starting at a young age Kelly found beauty in almost anything. She enjoys natural history, which is what prompted her degree in science. Her studies at RISD began in photography, a subject she has always admired. She enjoys works by Eva Hesse, Louise Bourgeois, Magdalena Abakanowicz, Mark Ryden, Frida Kahlo, David Wojnarowicz, Annette Messager, Joel-Peter Witkin and Simon Ward. Comparisons may also be drawn between the Victorian taxidermy works left by Walter Potter and Kelly's own whimsical creations.

== Career ==
Aside from the full-scale use of Victorian taxidermy, Kelly has made numerous wearable pieces of art in her jewelry. Her attention to detail is impeccable and ultimately the hands-on aspect of creating is what prompted her to go back to RISD and study metalsmithing. Despite her multi-layered CV, the use of taxidermy single-handedly puts her in a category with several very popular contemporary artists such as Polly Morgan, Damien Hirst, and Kate McGwire. Her inspiration comes from the stories of how things decay or are preserved. It is this interest in the controversial line between life and death that links Kelly to artists like Tim Noble and Sue Webster and brothers Jake and Dinos Chapman. In a way this has made it difficult to categorize her work because although it uses Victorian taxidermy and goldsmithing, it is also juxtaposing and celebrating the interplay or preservation and disintegration.

She has been included in numerous group and solo exhibitions across the globe. Places include: Canada, the United States, Switzerland, Germany, France, Korea, the United Kingdom, and Poland, and has been displayed at the Victoria and Albert Museum in London, Goldsmiths Hall, Sotheby's, Selfridges and Liberty's. Her work is also held in a number of private collections worldwide. McCallum also headlined the exhibition "Telling Tales" at the Victoria and Albert Museum in 2009.

== See also ==
- Taxidermy
- Contemporary art
