= Myra Kukiiyaut =

Inuk artist

- Born: 1929; Baker Lake, Northwest Territories, Canada
- Died: 2006 (aged 76–77)
- Known for: Pencil crayon drawing, textile art

Myra Kukiiyaut (1929–2006) was an Inuk artist born in Baker Lake, Northwest Territories, now Nunavut, Canada. Kukiiyaut was known for her works on paper, including drawing and printmaking. She also worked with sculpture and textiles.

Kukiiyaut's family followed a traditional Inuit lifestyle until 1957 when they decided to settle permanently in Baker Lake while her husband, fellow artist Luke Arngna'naaq, sought treatment outside of their community for his tuberculosis. To support her child during her husband's hospitalization, Kukiiyaut began creating and selling traditional garments and later began making art in 1960 when the Canadian federal government established an artistic program in the area.

Kukiiyaut was an accomplished Inuk throat singer having performed for the Inuit pavilion at the Expo 86 in Vancouver, British Columbia.

Her work is included in the collections of the National Gallery of Canada and the McMichael Canadian Art Collection.
