= Jinny Yu =

Canadian artist (born 1976)

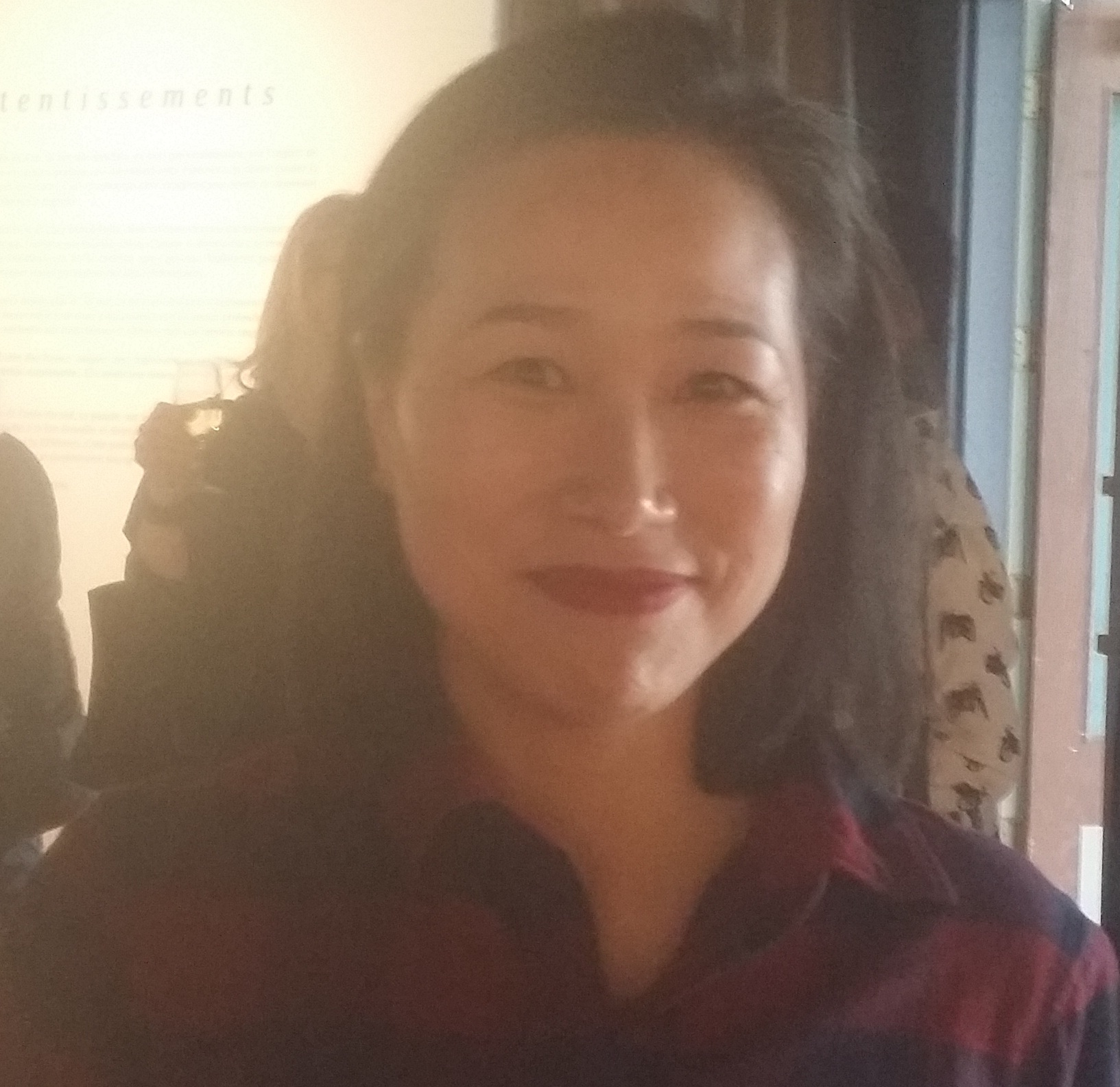
- Yu in 2019
- Born: 1976 (age 49–50); Seoul, South Korea
- Education: Dawson College (1995); Concordia University (1998); York University (2002)
- Known for: Painting; Installation art
- Style: Contemporary artist
- Awards: Laura Ciruls Painting Award Ontario Arts Foundation; Mid-Career Artist Award Council for the Arts in Ottawa

Jinny Yu (born 1976) is a Canadian contemporary artist and educator, known for her abstract paintings and installations that explore the complexities of belonging and place by reflecting on the shifting roles of guest and host. She is currently a Professor of Painting at the University of Ottawa.

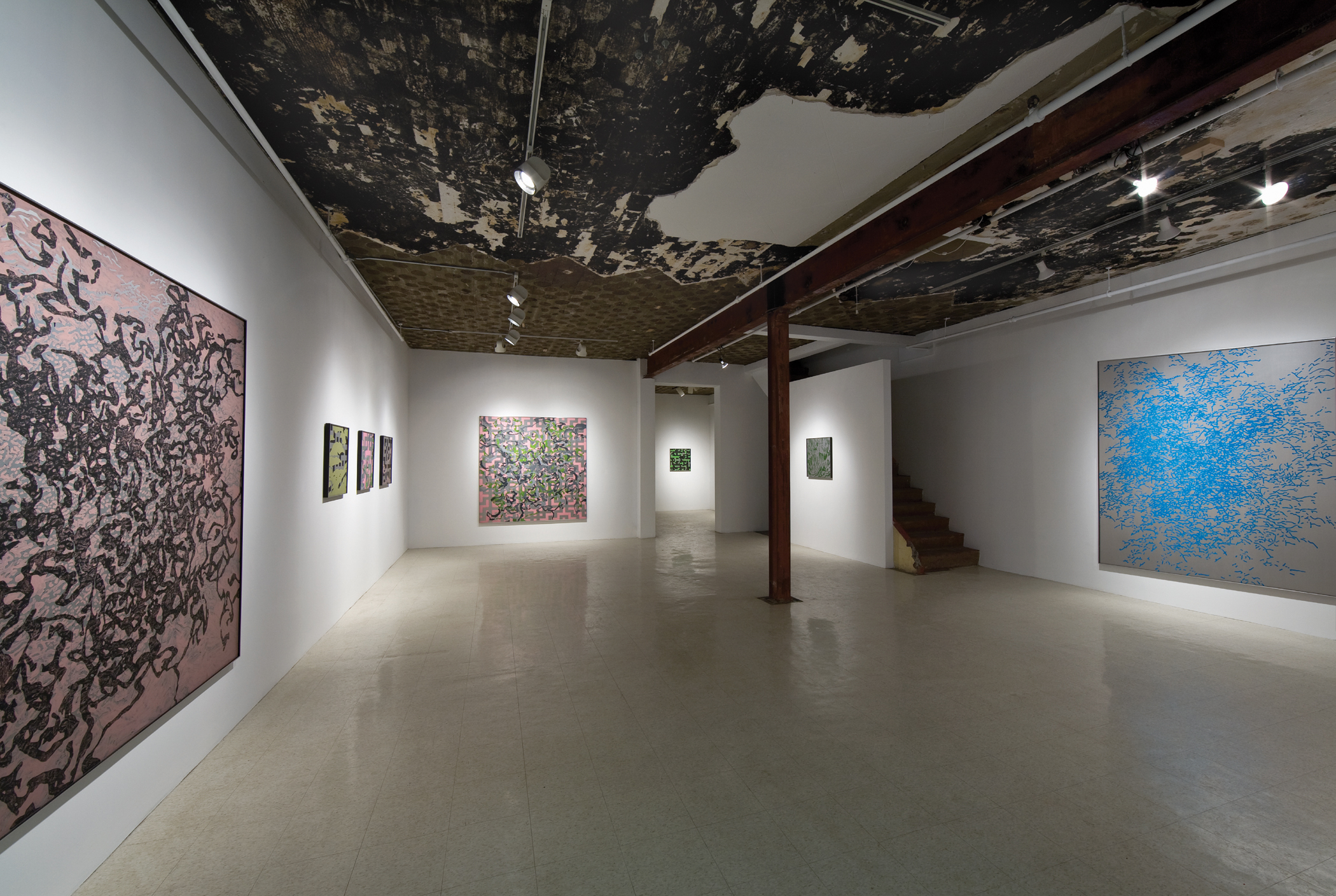
Jinny Yu's "Story of a Global Nomad", Exhibition view, Art Mûr gallery, Montreal, Quebec, Canada, February 2008.

== Early life and education ==
Jinny Yu was born in Seoul, South Korea and immigrated to Montreal, Canada in 1988. She began her formal arts education at Dawson College, earning a degree in fine arts in 1995, followed by a Bachelor of Fine Arts at Concordia University in 1998. She later completed a dual degree at York University, receiving both an MFA in Visual Arts and an MBA in Arts and Media Administration from the Schulich School of Business in 2002.

== Career ==
Jinny Yu’s practice is defined by "expanded painting," where she uses traditional techniques to explore conceptual and political questions. A central inquiry in her work is the relationship between "guest" and "host." She often reflects on her own position as a settler in Canada, examining the ethical and political responsibilities that come with occupying space. Yu is known for painting with oil and graphite on aluminum supports, a technique she has used since 2004. The material’s semi-reflective surface allows the support to act as both a mirror and a structural element, challenging the boundaries of the pictorial plane.

=== Early Artistic Development ===
Jinny Yu began her professional artistic practice in the late 1990s, gaining recognition in the Canadian and international art scenes for her abstract paintings that explore spatial concepts related to nomadic existence and identity fluidity. Her early works featured large-scale canvases with geometric abstraction, often reflecting themes of displacement and migration. A notable series from this period is Story of a Global Nomad (2007-2008), which integrates her interests in global displacement and dynamic compositions.

After completing her BFA, Yu undertook an artist residency in Banff. Once she finished her MFA she went on to do two more artist residencies in Berlin and Beijing. In 2006, she was appointed as a professor at the University of Ottawa. Her installation Sequence (2009) at Carleton University Art Gallery marked a significant milestone, extending her explorations into site-specific forms.

=== Mature Practice and Themes ===
Since the early 2010s, Yu's practice has concentrated on exploring the formal and spatial limits of painting. She has primarily used industrial-grade aluminum since 2004, manipulating the material to create works that blur the lines between two- and three-dimensionality. Through techniques like bending and layering applications of oil paint or Korean ink, her works, including Black Matter (2013) and Non-Painting Painting (2012), invite viewer engagement and challenge conventional boundaries.

In 2015, Yu exhibited the site-specific work Don't They Ever Stop Migrating? during the 56th Venice Biennale at the Oratorio di San Ludovico. She created an immersive experience where viewers enter a room made entirely of draped cotton panels, painted with clusters of ink strokes that evoke an overwhelming sense of “threatening flocks of birds.” The installation work used a sound collage of Alfred Hitchcock's 1963 film The Birds as a metaphor for the migration crises in the Mediterranean Sea and Bay of Bengal. The work is now in the permanent collection of the Agnes Etherington Art Centre.

In 2023, Yu collaborated with architect Ki Jun Kim and plant biochemist Frédéric Pitre on S’Y RETROUVER, a subterranean installation of earth and white clover that gives form to the interconnectedness of tree roots and fungal networks. Visitors navigated trench-like pathways designed slow movement and prompt reflection on the land they stand on. The use of clover, a species introduced by European settlers, engages questions of ecological and colonial histories.

Yu’s other public artworks include Breathing Out (2009) and Style of the Between (2016), presented at the Taewha River Eco Art Festival in South Korea.

Her installation Perpetual Guest (2019) addresses settler presence on unceded Algonquin Anishinaabe territory. After part of the work was accidentally shattered, Yu reworked it into Perpetual Guest 2019/2022: Impossibility of Repair, presenting the fragments in their original configuration. The piece reflects on the limits of repair and reconciliation, drawing parallels between material fracture and the complexities of settler–Indigenous relations.

In the early 2020s, after a period of working exclusively with black paint, Yu reintroduced color, resulting in geometric abstract paintings featured in her 2024 exhibition Jinny Yu: at once at the Art Gallery of Ontario. Her themes encompass self-reflexive scrutiny of painting, historical abstraction, and the complexities of belonging. Works like What is to be Done? (2012) and the Hôte drawings (2024) explore guest-host dynamics, migration, and colonialism's legacies.

=== Teaching and Institutional Roles ===
Jinny Yu was an assistant professor at Mount Allison University (2003–2005) before joining the University of Ottawa in 2006, where she is full professor in the Department of Visual Arts. Yu teaches courses on painting practice and contemporary art along with an intensive field course at the Venice Biennale which immerses students in both the art history of Venice and contemporary art dialogues.

=== The Canadian BIPOC Artists Rolodex ===
Yu is the lead investigator and visionary behind the Canadian BIPOC Artists Rolodex, a national digital humanities and advocacy project. This searchable database was created to address the systemic underrepresentation of Black, Indigenous, and People of Colour artists in Canadian art institutions and history.

=== Awards and Honours ===
Yu received the Mid-Career Artist Award from the Ottawa Arts Council in 2013. In 2012, she was awarded the Laura Ciruls Painting Award from the Ontario Arts Foundation. She was finalist for the Pulse Prize in New York in 2011 and 2014.

== Notable Exhibitions ==
- The world is burning and I am painting (2025–2026): A solo exhibition at the Dunlop Art Gallery in Regina, Canada.
- Superposition (2025): A solo exhibition at Fondation Guido Molinari in Montréal.
- Hidden Variables, Nicholas Metivier Gallery, Toronto, Ontario, November 8–December 6, 2025 (Yu's first solo presentation at the gallery).
- At once (2024): A major solo exhibition at the Art Gallery of Ontario (AGO), featuring the series Inextricably Ours.
- Don’t They Ever Stop Migrating? (2015): Presented at the 56th Venice Biennale, this site-specific installation used sound and ink-on-fabric paintings to comment on the political division over the global refugee crisis.

== Notable collections ==
- Montreal Museum of Fine Arts
- Art Gallery of Ontario
- Musée national des beaux-arts du Québec
- Agnes Etherington Art Centre
- Ottawa Art Gallery
