= Olive Mamak Innakatsik =

Inuk artist

- Born: 1915
- Died: 1994 (aged 78–79)

Olive Mamak Innakatsik (1915–1994) was an Inuk artist based in Baker Lake, North West Territories.

Her work is included in the collections of the National Gallery of Canada, the Art Gallery of Guelph, the Norman Zepp / Judith Varga Collection at the University of Saskatchewan and the Winnipeg Art Gallery.
