= Paula Murray =

Canadian artist (born 1958)

- Born: 1958 (age 67–68); Ottawa, Ontario, Canada
- Known for: ceramic artist

Paula Murray RCA (born 1958) is a Canadian ceramic artist from Ottawa, Ontario and currently based at Meech Lake, Quebec. Murray is best known for her thin porcelain sculptures with fibreglass overlay and fine crackling effects, inspired by natural shapes such as shells, coils, and scrolls. She is known for her innovative approach to technique and in-depth knowledge of materials in ceramics. Her pieces have been used by the Canadian government as gifts to dignitaries such as George W Bush and Kofi Annan.

== Education ==
Murray initially studied science at the University of Ottawa from 1975 to 1977 before studying ceramics at Sheridan College, School of Craft and Design in 1979, and then at The Banff Centre's summer residency sessions. After graduation she established her own pottery studio in 1986 at Meech Lake. She was inducted into the Royal Canadian Academy of Arts in 2007.

== Artistic Practice ==
Part of Murray's artistic practice is the installation of her delicate work, sometimes suspended from the ceiling, other times balanced on shelves or arranged with displays on the ground. Murray achieves a unique crackling effect in many of her works through the shaping and drying process of her custom clay with fibreglass layered on the surface. She explores concepts of peace, connection, and understanding through sculptural form often in relation to the natural world.

== Exhibitions ==
Murray has exhibited extensively in the Ottawa-Gatineau region at Ottawa City Hall, the Ottawa Art Gallery, the Ottawa School of Art, and Art-image et espace Odyssée in Gatineau. Murray has also exhibited internationally in the United States, China, Korea, Italy, Germany, Russia, and Paris. In 2020, her show Paula Murray: You Are Me was exhibited at the Art Gallery of Burlington after being exhibited at the Ottawa Art Gallery, and touring Quebec and being exhibited in the Taiwan Ceramic Biennale in 2018.
