= Annie Gardner Barr =

Canadian artist and social reformer

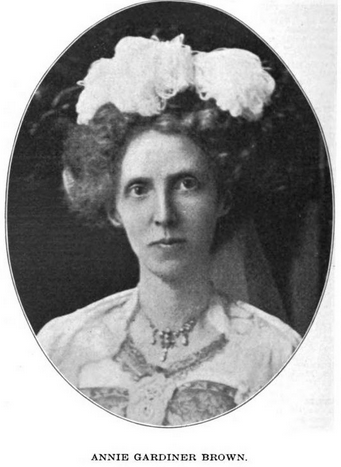
Annie Gardner Barr from a 1913 publication.

Annie Gardner Barr (29 July 1864 – 29 June 1921) was a Canadian artist and social reformer.

Barr graduated from the Brantford Young Ladies' College in 1883, receiving several awards, and went on to study art at Alma Ladies' College in St. Thomas, Ontario. In 1893 she graduated, and also received mention for a still life she exhibited at the World's Columbian Exposition in Chicago.

In 1895, Barr married George W. Brown and moved to Regina, Saskatchewan, where she was to spend the rest of her life. Her husband was a prominent homesteader, lawyer, businessman and politician, and as his wife she gained considerable influence. From 1910 to 1915 he served as Lieutenant Governor of the province.

Barr was active in the local Methodist church and, through the church, became an active supporter of the Local Council of Women, serving as an executive in the organization. The council brought together a number of women's organizations in which Barr was active, including the Woman's Christian Temperance Union, the Young Women's Christian Association, the Imperial Order Daughters of the Empire, the Women's Musical Club, the Abrdeen Association, the Hospital Aid, the Women's Educational Club, and the Kannata Club. She is not known to have been a vocal suffragist, but she was honorary president of the Provincial Equal Franchise Board in 1915 (Saskatchewan women achieved suffrage the next year). During the First World War she volunteered for the Red Cross and other war relief organizations.

Barr and her husband had two children: Beatrice Annie, born 1897, and Gordon Barr, born 1901. She died in 1921, her husband having predeceased her by two years.
