= Martha Stewart Leitch =

Canadian architect (1918–2015)

- Born: Martha Stewart Leitch; June 27, 1918; Halifax, Nova Scotia, Canada
- Died: December 20, 2015 (aged 97)
- Education: University of Toronto
- Occupation: Architect
- Known for: Architecture
- Awards: Citizen's Award (Association of Professional Engineers of Ontario)

Martha Stewart Leitch (June 27, 1918 – December 20, 2015) was a Canadian architect who graduated from the University of Toronto and later served as its Dean of Engineering.

== Career ==
Preferring to be known as "Marty", Leitch graduated with a Bachelors in Architecture from the University of Toronto and attended University of Cambridge for advanced studies after being chosen as a Commonwealth Scholar. She achieved Professional Engineer standing while teach at the University of Toronto and eventually became Dean of Engineering where she was a mentored hundreds of students over the span of her career.

Leitch entered into a profession of architecture and construction that was traditionally difficult for women, however she was adamant in staying in these professions "come hell or high water". During her career, she founded a civil engineering firm with her husband, acted as a lecturer, assistant professor, and Dean at the University of Toronto, became a fellow at the Royal Architectural Institute of Canada, and was member of the Ontario Association of Architects.
