= Anne Langton =

Canadian artist (1804–1893)

- self portrait, 1833
- Born: June 24, 1804; Yorkshire Dales, United Kingdom
- Died: May 10, 1893 (aged 88); Toronto, Canada
- Known for: Painter

Anne Langton (June 24, 1804 – May 10, 1893) was an English artist who specialized in landscapes and miniature portraiture. In 1837, she settled on the frontier in Upper Canada, where she continued her artwork and also became known for her writing.

== Life and career ==
She was born to Thomas and Ellen Langton in the Yorkshire Dales, but within a few months, they moved to Lancashire, where she was raised in a mansion named Blythe Hall, near Ormskirk. She and her brothers William and John were educated at home by their parents and private tutors. Her family travelled extensively through Austria, Belgium, France, Italy, Germany, and Switzerland, while the children received private art lessons from masters and exposure to literary figures wherever they stayed.

Following the Napoleonic Wars, which ended in 1815, Thomas Langton's business in England became unstable and the family was forced to return to England from their travels and studies in 1821. On their return they were forced to sell their mansion, dismiss all but one servant, and move to a small townhouse in Liverpool. At age 16, Anne took on many of the housekeeping duties and the care of her aging parents, while continuing her art work and training when possible.

After further financial losses, the family moved to Bootle, a small spa town north of Liverpool. Anne continued to hone her artistic skills and to visit friends and relatives throughout Britain for access to landscapes to sketch. She was also adept at painting miniatures in watercolour on ivory.

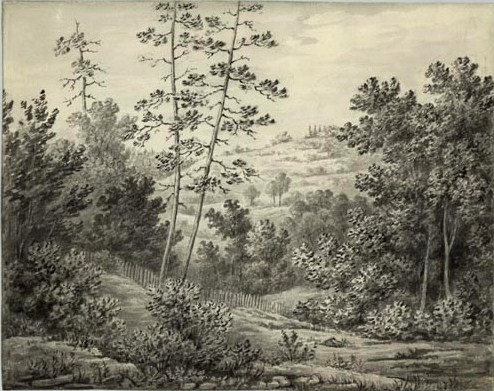
Rosedale in 1882 by Anne Langton

In 1833, Anne's brother John, after graduating from Cambridge, emigrated to Upper Canada and the family moved into a smaller house in Bootle. Langton's early years in Canada were published as A Gentlewoman in Upper Canada. By this time, nearing 30 years of age, Anne had not married and was experiencing hearing loss. By 1836, Anne's brother William had become a very successful Manchester businessman and he offered to pay his family's living expenses to enable them to stay in England, but the next year the family decided to join John Langdon in Canada.

Anne, her parents, and a maiden aunt, departed from Liverpool on May 24, 1837, and arrived in New York three weeks later. Their land journey through Toronto to arrived Peterborough, Ontario, took nearly two months, due to sightseeing at New York and Niagara Falls, visiting, and several illnesses on the way. They settled on John's farm on Sturgeon Lake, near Fenelon Falls, Ontario.

She died in 1893, in Toronto at age 88.
