= Risa Horowitz =

Canadian artist

- Born: 1970 (age 55–56); Toronto
- Education: York University, University of Saskatchewan
- Known for: Visual and media artist
- Awards: K.M. Hunter Artist Award

Risa Horowitz (born 1970) is a Canadian visual and media artist. Her works have been exhibited across Canada and internationally. Her work has been shown at Canada House in London, England, and is included in its permanent collection. She is currently a professor at the University of Regina, Saskatchewan, Canada.

== Education ==
Horowitz received her Bachelor of Fine Arts in Interdisciplinary Fine Arts Studies in 1995 at York University, and completed her master's degree in Visual Arts in 2000 at the University of Saskatchewan. In 2012 she completed her PhD in Visual Arts at York University.

== Career ==
She has lived and worked in seven different Canadian provinces and has taught critical issues for studio artists, photography, and digital imaging at York University and Grenfell Campus. She is currently a professor of Visual Arts in the Department of Visual Arts at the University of Regina, in Saskatchewan.

As an academic, Horowitz is interested in practice-based scholarship and the boundaries between expert and amateur, hobby and work, and leisure and productivity.

In 2011, she co-founded the Working Group for Studio Art Practice and Research for the University Art Association of Canada with Annie Martin.

== Works ==
Since 2019, Horowitz has participated in several two-person and group exhibitions including A New Light: Canadian Women Artists at the Canadian Embassy in Washington D.C., and Seeing Stars at the Stanley & Audrey Burton Gallery in Leeds.

=== I Set Out To Track The Sun (2018) ===
I Set Out to Track the Sun, is a body of photographic work centred on the midnight sun. This work was presented from November 2018 to January 2019 at Gallery Svalbard in Longyearbyen, Norway.

=== Landscapes and Silence (2016) ===
Landscapes and Silence featuring Horowitz's work Starfields and Fields (2016), was realized with the collaborative support of Edgar Pinto and exhibition co-curator Tanya Abraham of the Kashi Art Gallery and the Art Outreach Society (TAOS) in Kochi, Kerala.

=== Imaging Saturn (2016) ===
Imaging Saturn (2016) is a multimedia installation that focuses on Saturn, its orbit, and the paths of the sun and surrounding stars. Incorporating aspects of participatory science and data visualization, the exhibit combines astronomy and astrophotography with mapping of the ecliptic, background stars, and Saturn, a mechanized orbiter (developed with Ray Peterson), kinetic sculptures, and video. It reflects an interest in Saturn going back to 2010. In that year, Horowitz had a transcendent experience while observing Saturn through a telescope for the first time. This led to the launch of the Imaging Saturn project, which involves tracking Saturn's movements for the entire period of its 29-year orbit from 2011 to 2040. This work was continued at least until 2016, although Horowitz also acknowledged that in practice she might not continue the project for the entire 29 years.

=== Blurry Canada (2011) ===
During a road trip across Canada in 2010, Horowitz recorded 175 hours of continuous video and 20,000 images. Seventy-five chromogenic prints, and all 175 hours of video in a 13-day loop, were exhibited in her show Blurry Canada at Dunlop Sherwood Village Gallery in Regina in 2011. The exhibit was shown at the Art Gallery of Southwestern Manitoba in 2012.

=== Trio (2008) ===
Trio is a multichannel video installation that shows Horowitz' efforts to learn to play Franz Schubert's Piano Trio No. 2, a trio for piano, cello and violin. Trio was presented at the Experimental Art Foundation in Adelaide, Australia, in 2008.

=== Trees of Canada (2007) ===
For Trees of Canada Horowitz drew upon Canada's 2004 National Forest Inventory as an inspiration for examining indigenous and naturalized trees. Her resulting series of acrylic paintings was exhibited in 2007 at the Profiles Gallery, St. Albert, Alberta, and in 2008 at MKG127 Gallery, Toronto, Ontario. Twenty pieces from Trees of Canada (2007) were acquired by Department of Foreign Affairs and International Trade for the permanent collection of Canada House in London, England. Horowitz attended the unveiling, at which Queen Elizabeth II was present.

=== twitch (2003) ===
twitch (2003) is a group exhibition curated by Risa Horowitz. It began as a two-person exhibit which was orchestrated by the selection committee for regular programming at Ace Art inc. This hybrid collaboration consisted of five artists; David Rokeby’s Very Nervous System; Garnet Hertz’s Experiments in Galvanism; Nicholas Stedman’s The Blanket Project; Kevin Yates’ Untitled (Dying Bull) and other works; and Erika Lincoln's Scale.

twitch invites the viewer to consider the simulated fantasy that technology and interactive media can provide throughout the exhibit. Horowitz describes the exhibit; “twitch is about comfort; thought; pleasure; mystery; learning; joy; fear; pain; the search for meaning; mythology and enabling myths; our place in the universe; loneliness”.

=== Melitzah (2000–2007) ===
Melitzah (2000–2007) is an extensive vocal performance coupled with the Canadian Oxford Dictionary. Horowitz visualized every word in the dictionary with a waveform of her pronunciation of that word and documented her visualization in a set of 138 books and a website. Melitzah was selected for the FILE Electronic Language International Festival, São Paulo Brazil, in 2005.

=== girl before a mirror (2000) ===
girl before a mirror (2000) is an MFA project completed at the University of Saskatchewan originally exhibited at the Gordon Snelgrove Gallery. Its title is based loosely on a 1932 painting of the same name by Pablo Picasso. The project is a catalogue of self-portraits.

== Awards ==
Horowitz was the recipient of the K.M. Hunter Artist Award in 2006.
