= Nathalie Quagliotto =

Nathalie Quagliotto is an artist born in Montreal, Quebec, Canada in 1984. She received a Bachelor of Fine Arts degree from Concordia University in 2007, and a Master of Fine Arts degree from the University of Waterloo in 2009. She has exhibited sculpture in Canada particularly in Quebec and Ontario, the United States in New York City, and Australia in Melbourne. Quagliotto lives and works in Montreal, Canada and Kitchener, Ontario, Canada.

The artist works within the field of sculpture and produces sculptural forms by taking pre-fabricated objects that identify with childhood and reconfiguring them by simply changing their proximity levels and their colour. This act of replacement produces new social situations in accordance with the object for adults. The artist is known to use the colour "safety yellow" in almost all her work, as discussed by The Globe and Mail art critic Gary Michael Dault because of its public significance of caution, that the colour has become synonymous with the artist and the artist's practice. The artist is also known to double objects and place them together to demonstrate a co-operation within human relationships.

In 2017, Quagliotto's Probably was auctioned at a Timeraiser150 charity event.
