= List of Canadian painters =

The following is an alphabetical list of professional Canadian painters, primarily working in fine art painting and drawing. See other articles for information on Canadian art or a List of Canadian artists for other information.

== A ==
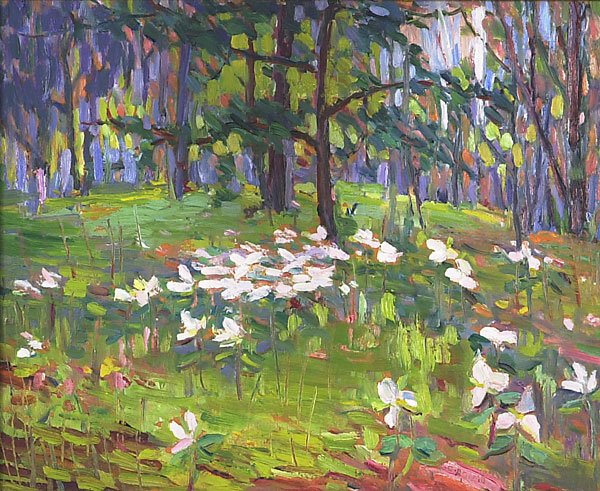
Trilliums (c. 1910), by Lily Osman Adams

- Isabella Mary Abbott (1890–1955) – artist
- Una Stella Abrahamson (1922–1999) – artist, writer
- Lily Osman Adams (1865–1945) – painter
- Marilla Adams (1864–1966) – artist
- Melita Aitken (1866–1945) – artist
- Aleen Aked (1907–2003) – Canadian-American painter
- Amelia Alcock-White (born 1981) – artist
- David T. Alexander (born 1947) – landscape painter
- Lady Eveline Marie Alexander (1821–1906) – painter
- Wilhelmina Alexander (1871–1961) – oil painter
- Libby Altwerger (1915–1995) – painter and printmaker
- Helen Andersen (1919–1995) – painter
- Marie-Elmina Anger (1844–1901) – painter
- Danielle April (1949–)
- Silvia Araya (1930–2021) – Chilean-born Canadian painter
- Caroline Armington (1875–1939) – painter and printmaker
- Shelagh Armstrong (born 1961) – illustrator
- William Armstrong (1822–1914) – landscape watercolourist
- Caven Atkins (1907–2000) – painter
- William Edwin Atkinson (1862–1926) – landscape painter
- Joe Average (1957–2024)
- Eruoma Awashish (born 1980) – Atikamekw painter
- Leo Ayotte (1909–1976) – oil painter
- Philip Aziz (1923–2009) – painter, sculptor

== B ==
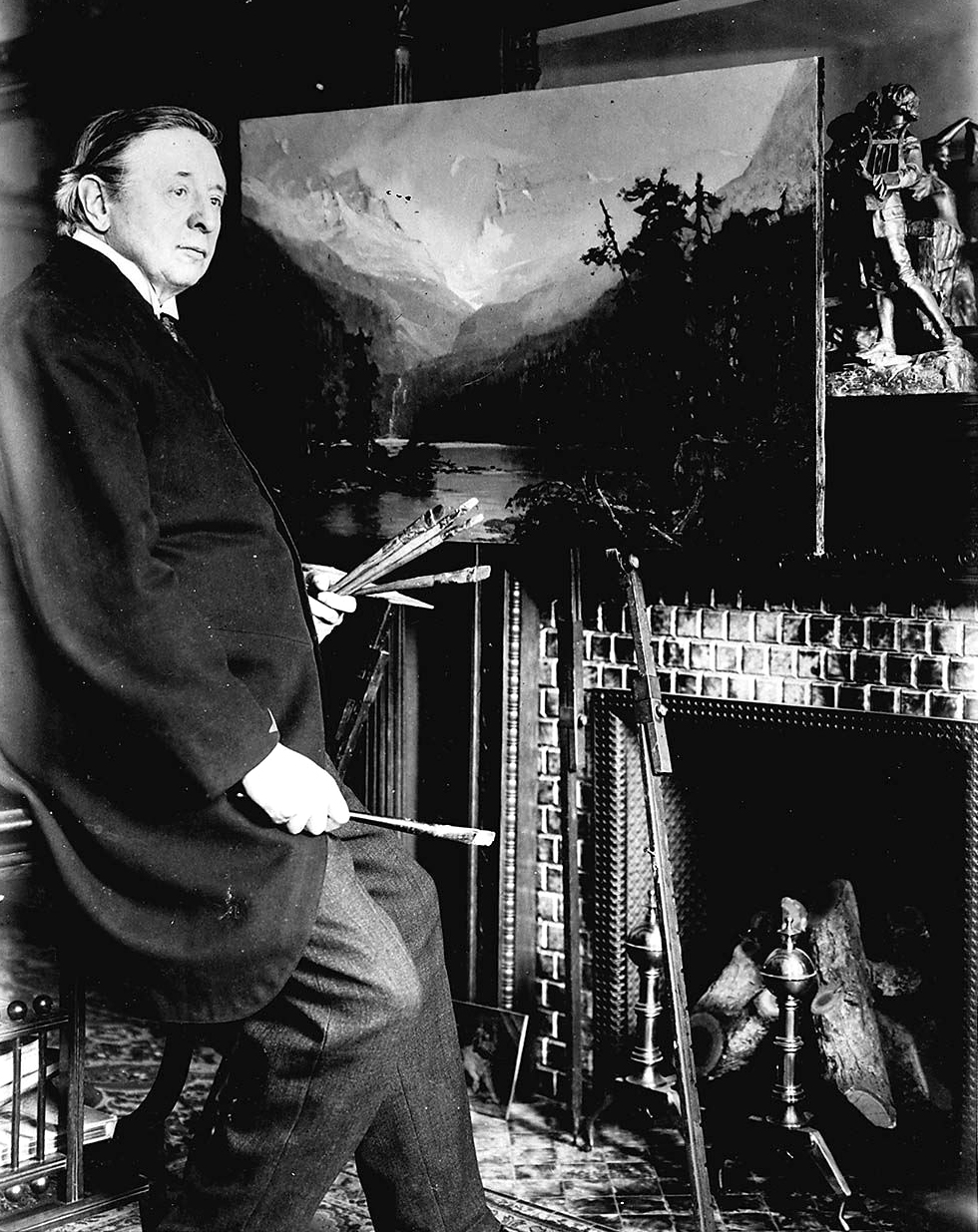
Frederic Marlett Bell-Smith

- Walter James Baber (1855–1924) – painter
- Earl Bailly (1903–1977) – mouth-painter and polio survivor
- Unity Bainbridge (1916–2017) – artist and poet
- Anna P. Baker (1928–1985) – painter
- Joan Balzar (1928–2016) – painter
- Marian Bantjes (1963–) – illustrator, designer, writer
- J. M. Barnsley (1861–1929) – painter
- Anne Meredith Barry (1932–2003) – painter
- Earl W. Bascom (1906–1995) – American-Canadian painter, printmaker and sculptor
- Robert Bateman (born 1930) – naturalist and painter
- Maxwell Bates (1906–1980) – painter, architect
- Valentina Battler (born 1946) – artist
- Aba Bayefsky (1923–2001) – painter
- Fanny Wright Bayfield (1813/14–1891) – illustrator
- Anong Beam – Ojibwe artist and curator
- John William Beatty (1869–1941) – painter
- François Beaucourt (1740–1794) – painter
- Claire Beaulieu (born 1955) – painter
- Beaver Hall Group
- Noah Becker (born 1970) – painter
- Christi Belcourt (1966–) – Métis painter
- Arnold Belkin (1930–1992) – Mexican-Canadian painter
- Frederic Marlett Bell-Smith (1846–1923) – watercolour and oil landscape painter
- Lorraine Bénic (1937–) – painter
- William Berczy (1744–1813) – pioneer and painter
- Rachel Berman (1946–2014) – American-born Canadian painter
- Judith Berry (born 1961) – painter
- George Théodore Berthon (1806–1892) – portrait painter
- André Charles Biéler (1896–1989) – painter and teacher
- David Bierk (1944–2002) – American-born Canadian painter
- Olive Biller (1879–1957) – artist and illustrator
- B.C. Binning (1909–1976) – painter, architect and teacher
- Yulia Biriukova (1897–1972) – painter
- Ron Bloore (1925–2009) – painter, member of the Regina Five
- Susanna Blunt (1955–) – painter
- Bruno Bobak (1923–2012) – Polish-born Canadian painter

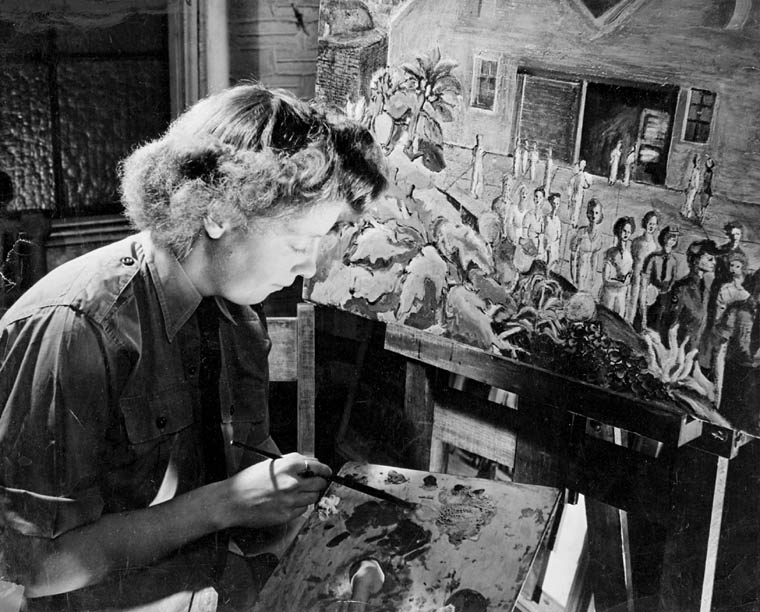
Molly Bobak

- Molly Lamb Bobak (1920–2014) – painter
- Louis Boekhout (1919–2012) – Dutch Canadian landscape painter
- Blanche Bolduc (1906/1907–1998) – Quebec painter, folk artist
- David Bolduc (1945–2010) – painter
- Eleanor Bond (born 1948) – painter, printmaker, and sculptor
- Marion Bond (1903–1965) – painter
- Paul-Émile Borduas (1905–1960) – painter
- Simone Mary Bouchard (1912–1945) – painter and textile artist
- Sylvie Bouchard (born 1959) – painter
- Céline Boucher (1945–) – painter, sculptor
- Shary Boyle (1972–) – painter, sculptor, performance artist
- Eva Theresa Bradshaw (1871–1938) – painter
- Fritz Brandtner (1896–1969) – painter
- Claude Breeze (born 1938) – painter
- Henrietta Hancock Britton (1873–1963) – painter
- Bertram Brooker (1888–1955) – writer, painter, musician
- Annora Brown (1899–1987) – painter and graphic artist
- Franklin Brownell (1856–1946) – painter, teacher
- William Blair Bruce (1859–1906) – painter
- Kittie Bruneau (1929–2021) – painter and printmaker
- William Brymner (1855–1925) – figure and landscape painter
- Karin Bubaš (1976–) – painter, photographer
- Della Burford (1946–) – painter, writer
- Dennis Burton (1933–2013) – painter
- Ralph Wallace Burton (1905–1983)
- Jack Bush (1909–1977) – abstract expressionist
- Sheila Butler (born 1940) – painter

== C ==
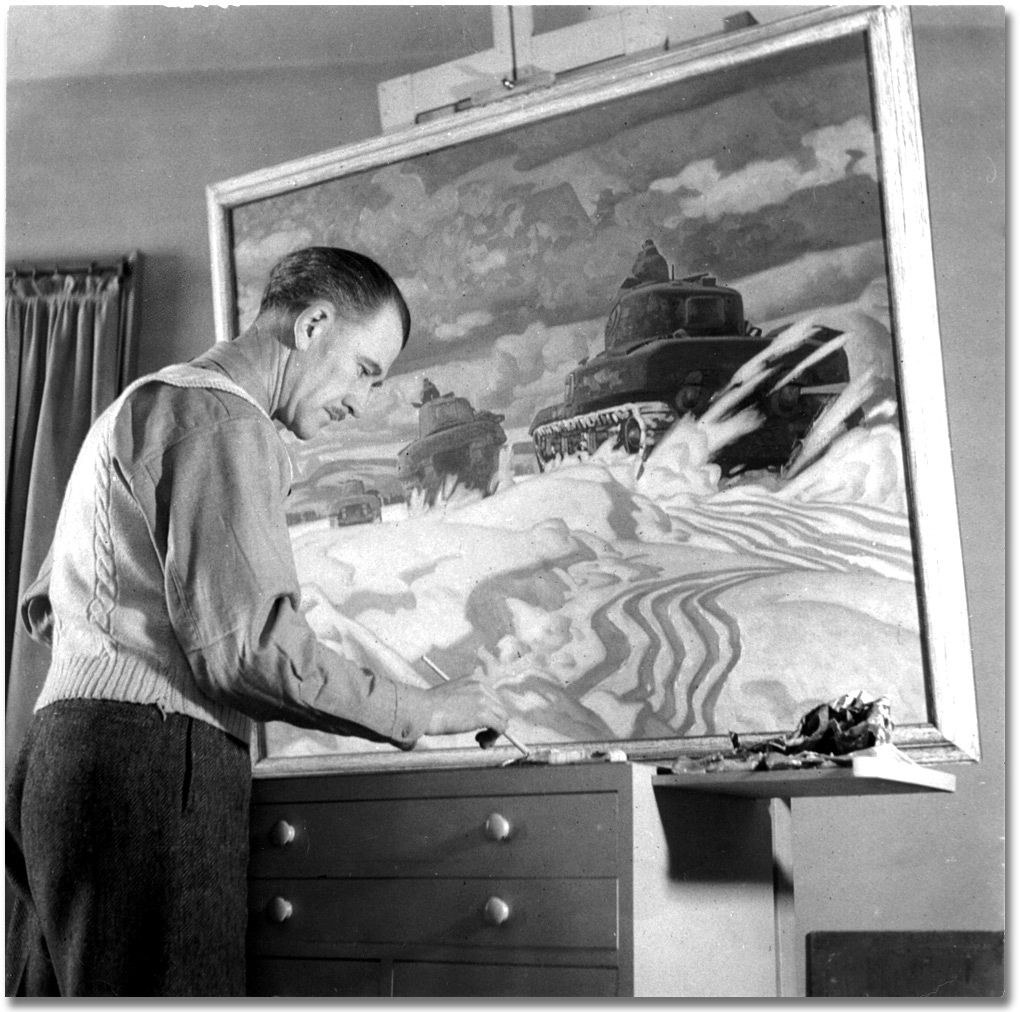
A. J. Casson

- Sveva Caetani (1917–1994) – Italian-Canadian painter
- Oscar Cahén (1916–1956) – painter, illustrator, member of Painters Eleven
- Ghitta Caiserman-Roth (1923–2005) – painter, printmaker
- Florence Carlyle (1864–1923) – figure and portrait painter
- Franklin Carmichael (1890–1945) – painter; member of the Group of Seven
- Emily Carr (1871–1945) – painter and writer
- Barbara Caruso (1937–2009) – colour field painter, illustrator, printmaker, book designer
- A. J. Casson (1898–1992) – painter of landscapes, forests and farms; member of the Group of Seven
- Mabel Cawthra (1871–1943) – painter
- Frederick Sproston Challener (1869–1959) – painter, muralist and teacher
- Jack Chambers (1931–1978) – painter and filmmaker
- Monique Charbonneau (1928–2014) – painter
- Benjamin Chee Chee (1944–1977) – Ojibwa painter
- Nan Lawson Cheney (1897–1985) – painter and medical illustrator
- Victor Child (1897–1960) – newspaper illustrator, painter and etcher
- Paraskeva Clark (1898–1986) – painter
- Alberta Cleland (1876–1960) – landscape painter
- Pierre Clerk (born 1928) – painter, sculptor and printmaker
- Nora Collyer (1898–1979) – painter; member of the Beaver Hall Group
- Alex Colville (1920–2013) – painter
- Charles Comfort (1900–1994) – painter, muralist, designer, educator
- Edith Grace Coombs (1890–1986) – painter
- Emily Coonan (1885–1971) – painter; member of the Beaver Hall Group
- Corno (1952–2016) – painter
- Sonia Cornwall (1919–2006) – painter
- Bruno Cote (1940–2010) – landscape painter
- Graham Coughtry (1931–1999) – painter
- Holly Coulis (born 1968) – painter
- Rody Kenny Courtice (1891–1973) – painter
- Linda Craddock (born 1952) – painter, photographer
- Sarah Lindley Crease (1826–1922) – watercolour painter
- William Cruikshank (1848–1922) – painter, teacher
- Maurice Cullen (1866–1934) – Impressionist painter
- Jane Catherine Cummins (1841–1893) – painter
- Greg Curnoe (1937–1992) – painter, co-founder of CAR
- Ruth Cuthand (1954–) – painter, printmaker, beader
- Colleen Cutschall (born 1951) – Oglala-Sicangu Lakota multi-media artist, professor
- Gertrude Spurr Cutts (1858–1941) – landscape painter

== D ==
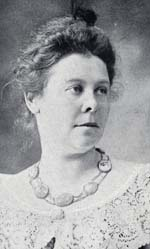
Mary Dignam

- Caroline Louisa Daly (1832–1893) – watercolour painter
- Kathleen Daly (1898–1994) – painter
- Ken Danby (1940–2007) – painter
- Charles Daudelin (1920–2001) – sculptor and painter
- Julia Dault (born 1977) – painter
- Karin Davie (1965–) – painter
- Sally Davies (1956–) – painter, photographer
- Forshaw Day (1837–1903) – painter and educator
- Katherine Day (1889–1976) – painter, printmaker
- Mabel Killam Day (1884–1960) – painter
- Louis de Niverville (1933–2019) – painter
- Simone Dénéchaud (1905–1974) – painter
- Mary Dignam (1860–1938) – painter; activist for women artists
- Melissa Doherty (1967–) – painter
- Eva Brook Donly (1867–1941) – painter
- Audrey Capel Doray (1931–2025) – multimedia artist
- Julie Doucet (1867–1941) – painter
- Marie-Denise Douyon (born 1961) – painter and illustrator
- Joseph Drapell (born 1940) – abstract painter
- Moira Dryer (1957–1992) – abstract painter
- Ann Macintosh Duff (1925–2022)
- Delree Dumont – painter
- Alma Duncan (1917–2004) – painter, filmmaker
- Edmond Dyonnet (1859–1954) – painter

== E ==
- Mary Alexandra Bell Eastlake (1854–1951) – painter
- Wyatt Eaton (1849–1896) – portrait painter
- Allan Edson (1846–1888) – landscape painter
- Emily Louise Orr Elliott (1867–1952) – painter and fashion illustrator
- Harold Elliott (1890–1968) – painter
- Kingmeata Etidlooie (1915–1989) – painter, sculptor
- Leya Evelyn (1937–) – painter
- Catherine Everett (born 1957) – sculptor and painter
- Peter Maxwell Ewart (1918–2001) – landscape painter

== F ==
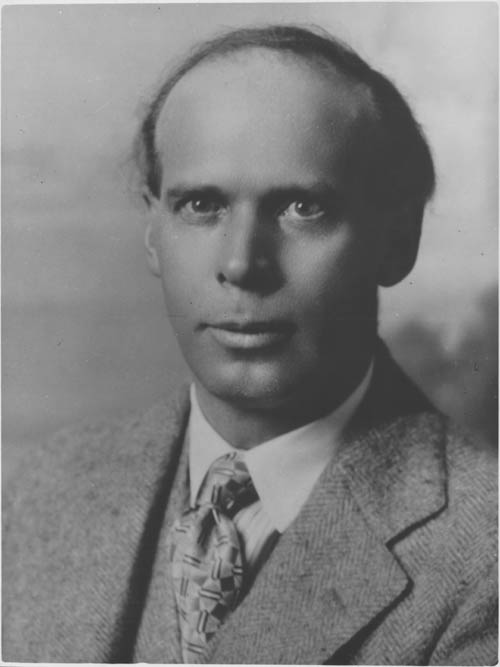
Lionel Lemoine Fitzgerald

- Lilias Farley (1907–1989) – painter, sculptor, muralist
- Caroline Farncomb (1859–1951) – painter
- Holly Farrell (born 1961) – painter
- Claire Fauteux (1889–1998) – painter
- Henriette Fauteux-Massé (1924–2005) – painter
- Holly Fay – painter
- Lillian Prest Ferguson (1867–1955) – painter
- Marcelle Ferron (1924–2001) – painter
- George Fertig (1915–1983) – painter and photographer
- Lionel LeMoine FitzGerald (1890–1956) – artist; member of the Group of Seven
- Julie Flett – Indigenous painter, illustrator
- Lita Fontaine (born 1953) – Indigenous multi-media painter
- Dulcie Foo Fat (born 1946) – painter
- Harriet Mary Ford (1859–1938) – painter, muralist, jeweller
- Nehemiah Ford (birth year unknown; died between 1858 and 1862) – painter, politician
- Nita Forrest (1926–1996) – painter
- John Wycliffe Lowes Forster (1850–1934) – painter
- Michael Forster (1907–2002) painter
- Mina Forsyth (1921–1987) – painter
- Marc-Aurèle Fortin (1888–1970) – painter
- Daniel Fowler (1810–1894) watercolour painter
- Hannah Franklin (1937–) – painter, sculptor
- Leanne Franson (1963–) – illustrator, cartoonist
- John Arthur Fraser (1838–1898) – painter
- Maida Parlow French (1891–1977) – painter, writer

== G ==
- Clarence Gagnon (1881–1942) – painter, etcher
- Marianna Gartner (1963–) – painter
- Yves Gaucher (1934–2000) – painter, printmaker
- Alyne Gauthier-Charlebois (1908–1955) – painter
- Robert Genn (1936–2014) – painter
- Lise Gervais (1933–1998) – painter, sculptor
- Sky Glabush (born 1970) – painter
- Eric Goldberg (1890–1969) – Jewish-Canadian painter
- Regina Seiden Goldberg (1897–1991) – painter
- Charles Goldhamer (1903–1985) – watercolour painter
- Betty Goodwin (1923–2008) – painter, sculptor
- Hortense Gordon (1886–1961) – painter
- Richard Gorman (1935–2010) – painter and printmaker
- Pnina Granirer (1935–) – painter
- Vaughan Grayson (1894–1995) – painter and printmaker
- Grimes (1988–) – musician, painter
- Daniel Charles Grose (1832–1900) – painter
- Angela Grossmann (1955–) – painter

== H ==
- Alexandra Haeseker (born 1945) – painter, printmaker, installation artist
- Clara Hagarty (1871–1958) – painter
- Sylvia Hahn (1911–2001) – painter
- Elizabeth Amherst Hale (1774–1826) – painter
- John Hall (born 1943) – painter
- Joice M. Hall (born 1943) – painter
- Kazuo Hamasaki (1925–2005) – Japanese-Canadian painter
- Henrietta Hamilton (1780–1857) – painter
- Mary Riter Hamilton (1873–1954) – painter; World War I artist
- John A. Hammond (1843–1939) – painter, photographer, printmaker
- Clara Isabella Harris (1887–1974) – painter
- Lawren Harris (1855–1970) – painter; member of the Group of Seven
- Robert Harris (1848–1919) – painter
- Ted Harrison (1926–2015) – painter
- Monique Harvey (1950–2001) – painter
- Iris Hauser (1956–) – painter
- Bobs Cogill Haworth (1900–1988) – painter
- Guenter Heim (1935–2014) – painter
- Pierre Henry (1932–2013) – painter; anecdotism art movement
- Carle Hessay (1911–1978) – painter
- Prudence Heward (1896–1947) – painter; member of the Beaver Hall Group
- Annie Hewlett (1997–1974) – writer, painter
- Gilah Yelin Hirsch (1944–) – painter
- Edwin Holgate (1892–1977) – painter, engraver; member of the Group of Seven
- Margaret Lindsay Holton (1955–) – painter
- William Hope (1863–1931) – painter, war artist
- Nesta Bowen Horne (1896-1987) – painter
- Yvonne McKague Housser (1898–1996) – painter, teacher
- Barbara Howard (1926–2002) – painter, engraver
- Amelia Frances Howard-Gibbon (1826–1874) – painter
- Patrick Howlett (born 1971) – visual artist
- E.J. Hughes (1913–2007) – painter
- Natalka Husar (born 1951) – painter

== I ==
- Jay Isaac (born 1975) – painter
- Gershon Iskowitz (1921–1988) – painter

== J ==
- A. Y. Jackson (1882–1974) – painter; founding member of the Group of Seven
- Otto Reinhold Jacobi (1812–1901) – painter
- Richard Jacobson (born 1959) – artist, illustrator
- Sybil Henley Jacobson (1881–1953) – painter
- Lucy Jarvis (1896–1985) – painter
- Charles William Jefferys (1869–1951) – painter, illustrator, author, teacher
- Sarah Anne Johnson (born 1976) – painter
- Frank Johnston (1888–1949) – artist; member of the Group of Seven
- Gladys Johnston (1906–1983) – painter
- John Young Johnstone (1887–1930) – painter
- Janet Jones (1952–2025) – painter
- Leonel Jules (born 1953) – painter

== K ==
- Paul Kane (1810–1871) – Irish-Canadian painter
- Gertrude Kearns (1950–) – war artist
- Estelle Muriel Kerr (1879–1971) – painter
- Katja MacLeod Kessin (1959–2006) – painter
- Janet Kigusiuq (1926–2005) – Inuit multidisciplinary artist
- Alicia Killaly (1836–1908) – painter
- Ada Gladys Killins (1901–1963) – painter
- Ada Florence Kinton (1859–1905) – painter, educator
- Ann Kipling (1934–2023) – painter
- Andrew Kiss (born 1946) – painter
- Bert Kloezeman (1921–1987) – painter and art educator
- Harold Klunder (born 1943) – Dutch-born Canadian painter
- Dorothy Knowles (1927–2023) – painter
- Elizabeth McGillivray Knowles (1866–1928) – painter
- F. McGillivray Knowles (1860–1932) – painter
- Wanda Koop (born 1951) – painter
- Cornelius Krieghoff (1815–1872) – painter of landscapes and outdoor life
- Maya Kulenovic (born 1975) – painter
- William Kurelek (1927–1977) – artist and writer

== L ==
- Françoise Labbé (1933–2001) – painter
- Stephen Lack (born 1946) – actor, painter
- Joy Laking (born 1950) – painter
- Artis Lane (1927–) – painter
- Dawn Langstroth (1979–) – painter, singer, songwriter
- Anne Langton (1804–1893) – painter
- Jo Lechay – painter, dancer, choreographer
- Ozias Leduc (1864–1955) – Quebec painter
- Gary Lee-Nova (born 1943) – painter, multimedia artist
- Jennifer Lefort (born 1976) – painter
- Joseph Légaré (1795–1855) – painter
- Irène Legendre (1904–1992) – painter
- Jean Paul Lemieux (1904–1990) – painter
- Serge Lemoyne (1941–1998) – performance artist, painter
- Rick Leong (born 1973) – painter, drawer
- Rita Letendre (1928–2021) – painter, muralist
- Marilyn Levine (1935–2005) – painter
- Maud Lewis (1903–1970) – painter
- Robert Henry Lindsay (1868–1938) – painter
- Oleg Lipchenko (born 1957) – painter, graphic artist, illustrator
- Arthur Lismer (1881–1969) – painter; member of the Group of Seven
- Mabel Lockerby (1882–1976) – painter
- Judith Lodge (born 1941) – painter, photographer
- Joy Zemel Long (1922–2018) – painter
- Marion Long (1882–1970) – painter
- Michèle Lorrain (1960–) – painter, installation artist
- Helen Lucas (1931–2023) – painter, writer
- Alexandra Luke (1902–1967) – painter
- Laura Muntz Lyall (1860–1930) – painter
- John Goodwin Lyman (1886–1967)

== M ==
- J. E. H. MacDonald (1873–1932) – painter; member of the Group of Seven
- Jock Macdonald (1887–1960) – painter; member of the Painters Eleven
- Landon Mackenzie (born 1954) – painter
- Pegi Nicol MacLeod (1904–1949) – painter
- Margaret Campbell Macpherson (1860–1931) – painter
- Christine Major (1966–) – painter
- Lorraine Malach (1933–2003) – ceramicist, painter
- Clifford Maracle (1944–1996) – painter, sculptor
- Jovette Marchessault (1938–2012) – painter, writer
- Agnes Martin (1912–2004) – painter
- Arthur N. Martin (1889–1961) – painter
- Thomas Mower Martin (1838–1934) – painter
- Marmaduke Matthews (1837–1913) – painter
- Henrietta Mabel May (1877–1971) – painter; member of the Beaver Hall Group
- Doris McCarthy (1910–2010) – painter
- Jean McEwen (1923–1999) – painter
- Florence Helena McGillivray (1864–1938) – painter
- Barbara McGivern (1945–2019) – painter
- Elizabeth McIntosh (born 1967) – painter
- Arthur McKay (1926–2000) – painter
- Mary R. McKie (active 1840–1862) – painter
- Isabel McLaughlin (1903–2002) – painter
- Fannie Knowling McNeil (1869–1928) – painter, suffragist
- Helen McNicoll (1879–1915) – painter
- Ray Mead (1921–1998) – painter; member of Painters Eleven
- Sandra Meigs (1953–) – painter
- John Meredith (1933–2000) – painter
- Muriel Millard (1922–2014) – painter
- Kenneth G. Mills (1923–2004) – painter
- David Milne (1882–1953) – painter, printmaker, writer
- Lisa Milroy (born 1959) – painter
- Berge Missakian (1933–2017) – painter
- Janet Mitchell (1912–1998) – painter
- Guido Molinari (1933–2004) – painter
- Caroline Monet (born 1985) – painter
- Kent Monkman (born 1965) – First Nations painter
- Belinda Montgomery (1950–) – actress, painter
- Shani Mootoo (1957–) – painter
- Ron Moppett (born 1945) – painter
- Judith Morgan (1930 – 2016) – Gitxsan painter
- James Wilson Morrice (1865–1924) – landscape painter
- Kathleen Morris (1893–1986) – painter; member of the Beaver Hall Group
- Norval Morrisseau (1932–2007) – painter
- Rita Mount (1885–1967) – painter
- Clara Mountcastle (1837–1908) – painter
- Louis Muhlstock (1904–2001) – Jewish-Canadian painter
- Kathleen Munn (1887–1974) – painter
- Laura Muntz Lyall (1860–1930) – impressionist painter

== N ==
- Tomori Nagamoto (born 1973) – visual artist
- Kazuo Nakamura (1926–2002) – painter and member of Painters Eleven
- Melaw Nakehk’o – painter, filmmaker, actress, activist
- Lilias Torrance Newton (1896–1980) – painter, member of the Beaver Hall Group
- Jack Nichols (1921–2009) – painter
- Marion Nicoll (1908–1985) – painter
- Shelley Niro (1954–) – painter
- Guity Novin (born 1944) – Iranian-Canadian painter

== O ==
- Lucius Richard O'Brien (1832–1899) – painter
- Daphne Odjig (1919–2016) – Indigenous painter, activist
- Ethel Ogden (1869–1902) – painter, educator
- Will Ogilvie (1901–1989) – painter, war artist
- Bobbie Oliver (born 1943) – painter
- Kim Ondaatje (born 1928) – painter, photographer, filmmaker
- Toni Onley (1928–2004) – painter
- Henry Orenstein (1918–2008) – painter, muralist, set designer

== P ==
- P. K. Page (1916–2010) – poet, painter
- Alfred C. Patstone (1908–1999) – romantic realist oil painter, rural
- Myfanwy Pavelic (1916–2007) – painter
- Paul Peel (1860–1892) – painter
- Eric Pehap (1912–1981) – abstract artist
- Alfred Pellan (1906–1988) – modern art pioneer, founder of Montreal art group known as Prisme d'yeux, rivals to Les Automatizes
- Sophie Pemberton (1869–1959) – painter
- George Douglas Pepper (1903–1962) – painter
- William Perehudoff (1918–2013) – painter
- Rae Perlin (1910–2006) – painter
- Vessna Perunovich (1960–) – painter, sculptor
- Llewellyn Petley-Jones (1908–1986) – Anglo-Canadian painter
- Christiane Pflug (1936–1972) – German-born Canadian painter, draughtsperson
- Bev Pike – painter
- Antoine Plamondon (1804–1895) – painter
- Joseph Plaskett (1918–2014) – painter
- Jane Ash Poitras (1951–) – painter
- Annie Pootoogook (1969–2016) – painter
- Alicia Popoff (1950–2015) – painter
- Barbara Pratt (1963–) – painter
- Christopher Pratt (1935–2022) – painter, flag designer
- Mary Pratt (1935–2018) – painter
- Jon Pylypchuk (born 1972) – painter, sculptor

== R ==
- Sherry Farrell Racette (born 1952) – Metis painter, mixed media artist
- Rosemary Radcliffe (1942–) – actress, painter
- Gordon Rayner (1935–2010) – painter
- George Agnew Reid (1860–1947) – painter
- Mary Hiester Reid (1854–1921) – painter
- Mary Wrinch Reid (1877–1969) – painter
- Jean-Paul Riopelle (1923–2002) – painter, sculptor
- Jim Robb (born 1933) – painter
- Louise Robert (1941–) – painter
- Goodridge Roberts (1904–1974) – painter
- Sarah Robertson (1891–1948) – painter
- Albert H. Robinson (1881–1956) – painter
- Christine Roche (1939–) – painter, illustrator, filmmaker
- Danièle Rochon (born 1946) – painter
- Dorothea Rockburne (1932–) – painter
- Otto Rogers (1935–2019) – painter
- Trisha Romance (born 1951) – painter
- William Ronald (1926–1998) – painter, founder of Painters Eleven
- Hilda Katherine Ross (1902–unknown) – painter, potter, educator
- Susan Ross (1915–2005) – painter
- Marina Roy – painter
- Cheryl Ruddock – painter
- Lorna Russell (1933–2023) – painter

== S ==
- Anne Savage (1896–1971) – painter, art teacher; member of the Beaver Hall Group
- Carl Schaefer (1903–1995) – painter, art teacher
- Charlotte Schreiber (1834–1922) – English-Canadian painter, illustrator
- Jacques Schyrgens (1923–2014) – Belgian-Canadian painter of watercolors and illustrator
- Marian Dale Scott (1906–1993) – painter
- Mary Scott (1948–) – painter
- Ethel Seath (1879–1963) – painter, art teacher; member of the Beaver Hall Group
- Regina Seiden (1897–1991) – painter
- Catherine Senitt (1945–) – painter
- Ernest Thompson Seton (1860–1946) – painter, naturalist, illustrator
- Jack Shadbolt (1909–1998) – painter, war artist and teacher
- Helen Parsons Shepherd (1923–2008) – painter
- Arnold Shives (born 1943) – painter, multimedia artist, printmaker
- Henrietta Shore (1880–1963) – painter
- Edward Scrope Shrapnel (1845–1920) – painter
- Ron Shuebrook (born 1943) – artist
- Claude A. Simard (1943–2014) – painter
- Elizabeth Simcoe (1763–1850) – Anglo-Canadian painter
- Lorraine Simms (1956–) – painter
- Ruby Slipperjack (1952–) – writer, painter
- Paul Sloggett (born 1950) – painter and teacher
- Edith Smith (1867–1954) – painter and teacher
- Freda Pemberton Smith (1902–1991) – painter
- Gordon A. Smith (1919–2020) – painter, printmaker, sculptor, teacher
- Jean Smith (born 1959) – painter, musician, writer
- Jori Smith (1907–2005) – painter
- K. C. Smith (1924–2000) – painter, conservationist
- Michael Snow (1928–2023) – painter
- Daniel Solomon (born 1945) – abstract painter and teacher
- David G. Sorensen (1937–2011) – painter
- Paul Soulikias (1926–2023) – painter
- Doris Huestis Speirs (1894–1989) – ornithologist, painter
- Owen Staples (1866–1949) – painter, etcher, political cartoonist
- Godfrey Stephens (born 1939) – painter, sculptor
- John Edmund Strandberg (1911–1996) – Swedish-Canadian painter
- Leesa Streifler (1957–) – painter, professor
- Ronald Suchiu (born 1952) – painter
- Philip Surrey (1910–1990) – painter
- Marc-Aurèle de Foy Suzor-Coté (1869–1937) – painter, sculptor
- Magda Szabo (1934–2024) – painter

== T ==
- Sylvia Tait (1932–) – painter
- Takao Tanabe (born 1926) – painter
- Monica Tap (1962–) – painter, professor
- Daniel Taylor (born 1955) – painter
- David Thauberger (born 1948) – painter
- Denyse Thomasos (1964–2012) – painter
- Tom Thomson (1877–1917) – painter; mentor to the Group of Seven
- Mildred Valley Thornton (1890–1967) – painter
- Gideon Tomaschoff (born 1956) – artist
- Gentile Tondino (1923–2001) – artist, educator
- Jacques de Tonnancour (1917–2005) – artist, educator
- Fernand Toupin (1930–2009) – painter, member of the Plasticiens
- Harold Town (1924–1990) – painter, member of Painters Eleven
- Cory Trépanier (born 1968) – painter, filmmaker

== U ==
- Tony Urquhart (1934–2022) – painter and sculptor

== V ==
- Armand Vaillancourt (born 1929) – sculptor, painter
- Florence Vale (1909–2003) – painter
- Frederick Varley (1881–1969) – painter, war artist; member of the Group of Seven
- James Verbicky (born 1973) – mixed media, painter
- Frederick Arthur Verner (1836–1928) – painter
- Roy Henry Vickers (born 1946) – First Nations painter

== W ==
- Marion Wagschal (1943–) – painter
- Carol Wainio (1955–) – painter
- Horatio Walker (1858–1938) – painter
- Ronan Walsh (1958–) – artist
- Emily Warren (1869–1956) – painter
- Lowrie Warrener (1900–1983) – painter
- Darrell Wasyk (1958–) – painter
- Homer Watson (1855–1936) – painter
- Vera Weatherbie (1909–1977) – painter
- Barbara Weaver-Bosson (1953–) – painter
- Robert R. Whale (1805–1887) – painter
- Diane Whitehouse (1940–) – painter
- Joyce Wieland (1930–1998) – filmmaker, painter, mixed media
- Shirley Wiitasalo (1949–) – painter
- York Wilson (1907–1984) – painter, muralist
- Chloe Wise (1990–) – painter
- Matthew Wong (1984–2019) – painter
- Kamila Wozniakowska (1956–) – painter
- Mary E. Wrinch (1881–1968) – painter

== Y ==
- Walter Yarwood (1917–1996) – abstract painter and member of Painters Eleven
- M. A. Yewdale (1908–2000) – pioneer and heritage artist
- Jinny Yu (born 1976)

== Z ==
- Marguerite Porter Zwicker (1904–1993) – watercolor painter and art promoter

== See also ==
- Beaver Hall Group
- Canadian Art Club
- Group of Seven
- Indian Group of Seven
- List of Canadian artists
- Painters Eleven
- Regina Five
