= K. C. Smith =

Keith Cornock (K.C.) Smith was a Canadian artist.

Born in Daupin, Manitoba in 1924, Smith was raised in Depression era British Columbia. He became a member of the early environmental group the League of Conservationists, explored the Coast Mountains and the Rockies, worked as a camp cook for a trail guide outfit and later as a park naturalist at Wasa Lake Provincial Park.

During the Second World War Smith served in the Canadian Navy. When the war ended, he found a job as an apprentice sign painter, later working throughout the British Columbia interior. Later, he worked painting movie marquees. One of his most memorable paintings was a 12-foot high image of Orson Welles at the Studio Theatre in Vancouver, British Columbia.

In the 1950s, Smith travelled the western USA, eventually working as a journeyman sign painter in Laguna Beach, California. In 1952, he married Arlene Legault and began painting formally. They raised their sons (Mike and Blake) and a daughter (Jamie).

Smith led workshops and mentored artists such as Cameron Bird and Karen Hershey. His circle of friends included painters Carl Rungius, Nicholas de Grandmaison and sculptor Nicholas Scriver.

Smith was adamant that painting was about technique and feeling as much as subject; that brushwork was as important as composition. The bulk of his artwork comprised oil paintings and pencil sketches.

Smith lived in and near Cranbrook, B.C. through the 1970s and 80s. He later moved to Vancouver and then to Qualicum Beach where he lived and painted until his death in July, 2000.
