= Irène Legendre =

Canadian-American painter

- Born: 17 November 1904; Fall River, Massachusetts, United States
- Died: 1992 (aged 87–88); Cap-Rouge, Quebec City, Quebec, Canada
- Education: École des beaux-arts de Québec (1932)
- Known for: Painter
- Style: Abstract art Landscape painting
- Awards: First Place, Quebec Provincial Competition, 1945

Irène Legendre (born 17 November 1904 – 1992) was a Canadian-American painter.

== Life and work ==
Irène Legendre was born in Fall River, Massachusetts in November 1904. Legendre started attending École des Beaux-Arts de Québec in 1929, where she studied under Yvan Neilson and Lucien Martial. Legendre graduated in 1932 with a focus on the Cubism style. From 1939 until 1943, she resided in New York City where she studied painting under Amédée Ozenfant and sculpture with Alexander Archipenko. After studying with Archipenko and Ozenfant, she shifted away from Cubism and began painting landscapes. While in New York, she participated in her first group show.

Legendre had returned to Canada by 1946. That year, she Legendre hosted a five-part series about modern painting on Radio-Canada. She organized art exhibitions, featuring works by herself and others, including Paul-Émile Borduas, Stanley Cosgrove, and Goodridge Roberts. In the 1960s, Legendre taught at the École des Beaux-Arts de Québec.

Legendre died in 1992 in Cap-Rouge, Quebec City.

== Notable exhibitions ==
- "Women Artists: Gaining Space, 1900-1965," 23 May-29 August 2010, Musée d'art de Joliette
