= Bert Kloezeman =

Canadian artist (1921–1987)

Gijsbertus Bert Kloezeman (born July 16, 1921, in Ipoh, Malaysia, died March 22, 1987) was a painter and art educator in Canada. Bert was the second of four sons, (Jan, Bert, Frits, Ben) all of whom became artists in their own right.

== Career ==
After completing his studies in The Royal Academy of Fine Arts in The Hague, Netherlands he decided to move to Canada with his family, in 1952. He taught History of Art and Oil Painting in Woodstock, Ontario, and contributed to establish the Oxford County Art Association. Later he moved to London, Ontario where he joined the Faculty Staff of the Beal Art School where he taught Printmaking, Oil and Acrylic Painting to many Canadian and foreign students for many decades. One of his superior traits as an instructor was his gentle ability to inspire his students to develop their own creativity and potential for self-criticism. While at Beal Art School he also had a period of intense and prolific creativity and had many exhibitions of his art work which included printmaking, chalk pastel and charcoal drawings, and watercolours, . In these art works he portrays still life, landscape and portraits not only from his country but also on many features of Canadian life. He was a member of the Nancy Poole Gallery in London and Toronto and then the Thielsen Gallery in London Ontario.
