= Melita Aitken =

Canadian artist and writer (1866-1945)

- Born: March 31, 1866; Drumbo, Canada West
- Died: August 28, 1945 (aged 79); Vancouver, B.C.
- Known for: artist, writer
- Spouse: Captain Robert James Aitken

Melita Aitken (March 31, 1866 – August 28, 1945) was a Canadian artist and writer.

She was born in Drumbo, Ontario and studied art with Mary Dignam in Toronto and with John Vanderpoel at the Art Institute of Chicago. At first, Aitken painted portraits in oil but switched to painting flowers in watercolour after finding out that lead in the oil paints was affecting her health.

She married Captain Robert James Aitken; the couple had three children. He was killed in action during World War I. After spending some time overseas, she returned to Sault Ste. Marie, later moving to Victoria and then Vancouver.

Her work was included in exhibitions at the Royal Academy in London, England, at the Royal Canadian Academy of Arts, at the Salon des artistes français in Paris, at spring shows of the Art Association of Montreal, at the Victoria Art Gallery and at the Vancouver Art Gallery.

Around 1920, she published a collection of poems Maple Grove, and Other Poems.

Aitken died in Vancouver at the age of 79.
