= Barbara Weaver-Bosson =

Artist

Barbara Weaver-Bosson is an artist whose paintings document the architectural character of Victoria, British Columbia. Since 1978, her paintings have illustrated Canada's West Coast urban landscape as it changes. In numerous works of art, she has created a visual and residential history of the area. Her detailed paintings document Victoria's street views, seaside neighbourhoods and harbour areas.

== Early life and education ==
Born in Calgary, Alberta, Weaver-Bosson grew up in Calgary's south-west community of Shaganappi. At the age of seventeen, she was accepted into the four-year fine art program at the Alberta College of Art. She graduated in 1974 with a Diploma in Applied Arts.

In 1975, after a year working as an illustrator and layout artist in a Calgary advertising agency, Weaver-Bosson and her partner Victor Bosson moved to Victoria. Her first job there was as an assistant background artist for comic book artist John Byrne.

In the 1980s, she studied Architectural Rendering and Perspectives through Camosun College in Victoria. She continued to paint and exhibit while working as an art supply sales assistant at Island Blue Print between 1978 and 1986. That December, Weaver-Bosson left her job to work full-time as an artist and to travel abroad. Her 2018 oral history describes her artistic trajectory.

== Art work ==
Weaver-Bosson's first solo exhibition was in 1978. ″Where the Sky, Earth and Water Meet″ showed at The Emily Carr Art Centre. She continues to exhibit for twenty-five years in numerous private galleries. She participated in public art events as well as the art rental program at the Art Gallery of Greater Victoria. Since the 1980s, she has focused on a distinctive series of artworks and has received numerous private and public commissions. The Globe and Mail featured her art in a 2012 article.

=== Neighbourhood series paintings ===
In 1980, after moving her home and studio to the close-knit Moss Rock area of Victoria's Fairfield neighbourhood, Weaver-Bosson's painting approach changed. She titled her new body of work The Neighbourhood series. It reveals colourful rooftop vistas, character homes on tree-lined streets, harbour views and coastal images. In 1993, due to public demand, Weaver-Bosson began publishing limited edition prints. Her print series contains over twenty-five prints in limited and open editions.

In 1991, Weaver-Bosson's ″Two Neighbourhoods″ exhibition opened at Winchester Gallery in Victoria, where the then Mayor of Victoria, David Turner, welcomed a Sister City Friendship Delegation from Morioka, Japan. Weaver-Bosson's exhibition featured residential views of both Victoria and Morioka.

=== Cultural exchange with Morioka, Japan ===
Weaver-Bosson's numerous trips to Victoria's sister city of Morioka built an artistic and cultural exchange. In 1987, she presented Morioka with a gift of her original art. In 1989, Weaver-Bosson returned to Japan to install her first international exhibition, ″The Bridge″, along with artist Victor Bosson. In May 2015, on the thirtieth anniversary of twinning with Victoria, Mayor Lisa Helps and the new delegation selected Weaver-Bosson's artwork for another gift to Morioka.

== Community involvement ==
As a long-time member of the Island Illustrators Society, Weaver-Bosson has given talks, participated in various juried exhibitions and hosted other events for many other groups.

In addition, for many years she organized the city's biggest annual open studio event, the Fairfield Artists Studio Tour. For twenty years until 2009, Weaver-Bosson was a key figure at the Moss Street Paint-in.
