= Guenter Heim =

Canadian artist (1935–2014)

- Born: April 8, 1935; Nuremberg, Bavaria, Germany
- Died: June 10, 2014 (aged 79)
- Occupation: Artist
- Known for: Impressionistic landscapes of western Canada

Guenter Heim (April 8, 1935 – June 10, 2014) was a Canadian artist notable for his impressionistic landscapes of western Canada. Born in Nuremberg, Germany, Heim studied with Ludwig Schultheiss. He moved to Canada in 1954, and continued his studies at the H.B. Beal Technical School in London, Ontario with Hugh Mackenzie and Herb Arris. He worked as a television artist in Wingham, Ontario (1967) and later, he taught at Fanshawe College in London, and Georgian College in Owen Sound, Ontario. He moved to Alberta in 1977. Working in oil, acrylic and watercolour, his subjects include ranch, genre and prairie scenes near Edmonton and Calgary, Alberta and in the Okanagan, British Columbia. His work is in the collections of the Lunenburg Art Gallery and Tom Thomson Art Gallery. He died on June 10, 2014, aged 79.
