= Alyne Gauthier-Charlebois =

Canadian artist

Alyne Gauthier-Charlebois (1908-1955) was a Canadian artist.

Her work is included in the collections of the National Gallery of Canada and the Musée national des beaux-arts du Québec.
