= Katherine Day =

Canadian artist

Katherine Day (January 7, 1889 – March 12, 1976) was a Canadian artist.

== Career ==
The daughter of Creemore teachers Isaac and Janet (Caswell) Day, Katherine (Kate) was born in Orillia, Ontario, and received a BA from Queen's University in 1912. She then became a social worker. During World War I, Day was a volunteer nursing assistant in England. She returned to Canada in 1920. From 1922 to 1923, she studied painting with Franz Johnston at the Winnipeg School of Art and then attended the Ontario College of Art from 1929 to 1930. Returning overseas in 1933, she continued her studies at the Central School of Arts and Crafts in London and then studied with Nicolas Eekman and Henri Jannot in Paris. After her return to Canada in 1936, she made her living as a school teacher and social worker, pursued her art, and became a member of the Canadian Society of Graphic Artists and of the Society of Canadian Painter-Etchers and Engravers; Day participated in exhibitions with both of these groups.

She died in Orillia at the age of 87.

One of her woodcut prints is included in the collection of the National Gallery of Canada.
