= Sylvie Bouchard =

Canadian painter

- Born: 1959 (age 65–66); Montreal, Quebec

Sylvie Bouchard (born 1959) is a Canadian painter.

In 2005 the Musée d'art contemporain de Montréal presented a 20-year retrospective of her work. Her work is included in the collection of the Musée national des beaux-arts du Québec and the City of Montreal public art collection.
