= Andrew Kiss =

Canadian artist

Andrew Kiss is a Canadian artist, who focuses primarily on landscape art, particularly oil painting.

Born in Hungary in 1946, he and his family emigrated to Canada in 1957. After arriving on the East Coast of Canada, they moved to the Vancouver Island, Cowichan Lake area in British Columbia. Kiss spent his early adulthood employed as a draftsman. After being transferred to the town of Mackenzie, British Columbia in 1974, he began to spend more time on his art.

Kiss has exhibited in Hong Kong, Switzerland, England, Austria, New Zealand and Germany. In North America he has exhibited in Florida, South Carolina, Las Vegas, Montana, Phoenix, Seattle, and in Canada.

He currently lives in Calgary, Alberta, Canada.
