= Alfred C. Patstone =

Canadian artist (1908–1999)

Alfred Cyril Patstone (1908 – 10 December 1999) was a Canadian romantic realist painter who captured Canada's disappearing rural charm with his oil paintings of vanishing barns, old houses, western grain elevators and much more. He was deeply influenced by the work of the American artist Andrew Wyeth who inspired him to capture the countryside in the realist fashion. He was most widely known for his works featuring Canadian barns, which have been acquired by galleries and private collections in Europe, the United States, and from coast to coast in Canada.

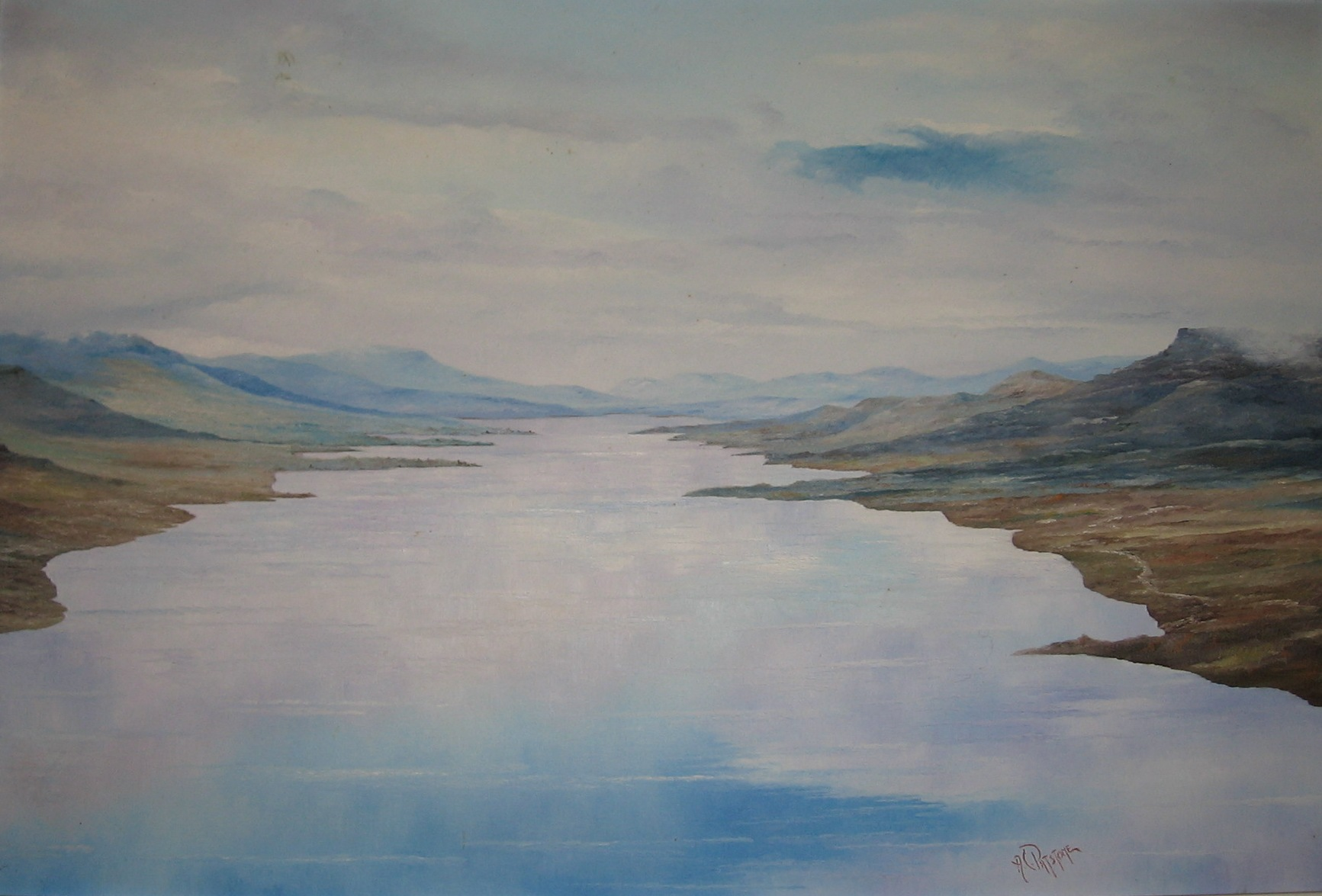
Alfred C. Patstone, Yukon at Dawn, painted near Dawson, YK (From the private collection of Mr. Nino Faragalli of Mont-Tremblant, QC)

Patstone was born in 1908 in Bentley, Alberta, where his father was an Anglican pioneer missionary. In 1917 his family moved to Woodman's Point New Brunswick where he spent most of his childhood. As an artistically inclined youth, at fourteen be began experimenting with several mediums from oil painting to designing and engraving. He later found employment as an engraver with Gordon Plummer of Saint John, New Brunswick.

In 1929 Patstone was in his early 20s when he was admitted to the Hamilton School of Fine Arts where he studied painting, gemology, design and architecture. In addition to the Hamilton School of Fine Arts, over the years he further attended fine arts schools in Ontario and Quebec. He took every chance he could to further his skill and was also present at several study sessions in major art galleries in England, France, Germany, and Switzerland. While attending school he joined the firm of Henry Birks & Sons in Hamilton, Ontario.

In 1937 he began making strides in his artistic career when he won an award for his portrait of a fisherman and an honourable mention for a seascape at an exhibition in Saint John, New Brunswick. However, after serving in the Royal Canadian Air Force during World War II, Patstone was still relying on his gemology career. In 1953 Birks & Sons transferred him from Hamilton to Montreal where he continued his painting between overseas assignments as a buyer and design consultant for the firm. It was this travel which ultimately propelled his painting career into its peak form as it afforded him several opportunities to study the work of other artists in galleries and exhibitions. Specifically, the work of American artist Andrew Wyeth, coupled with the views of Canada's disappearing rural charm, fashioned his romantic realist painting style.

His last transfer occurred in 1963 to Edmonton, Alberta, where he worked as a gemologist. All of his personal time was poured into his artwork and the result was a steadily increased production of paintings which he successfully exhibited.

Finally, at the age of fifty five Patstone turned to full-time painting and began producing about seventy paintings a year. A 1973 solo show of his work was held at Galerie Roslyn in Montreal and proved so successful that he established a studio in that city. Throughout his career he was dedicated to a genuine craftsmanship and naturalism which proved especially popular with the Canadian public and was best executed in his series of Vanishing Canadian Barns.

Each year until his death Patstone travelled across Canada on sketching trips after which he returned to his studio to devote his time to 'painting up' on canvas the numerous sketches made on his travels. He had a particular affinity for the country side of Quebec where he could often be found snowshoeing and seeking inspiration.

Alfred C. Patstone died on 10 December 1999, at the age of 91 in Saint John, New Brunswick. A quiet service was held in Grand Bay–Westfield, New Brunswick, in his honor. He was buried in St. Peter's Anglican cemetery, at Woodman's Point, directly beside the house where he was raised as a boy.

== Gallery of works ==
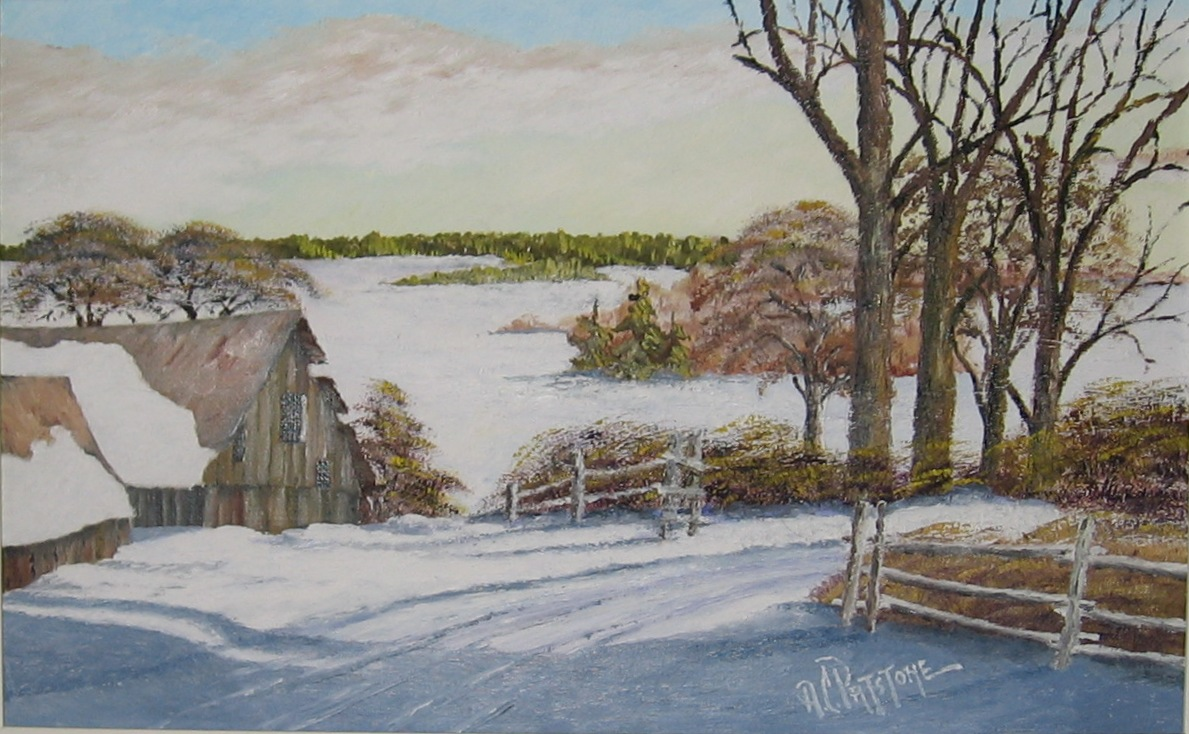
Alfred C. Patstone, Farm Road 1997.

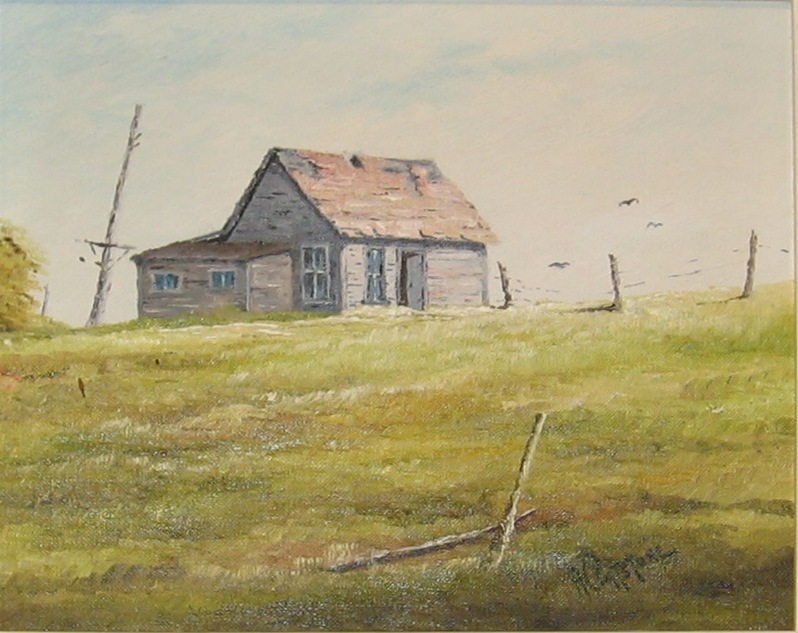
Alfred C. Patstone, Settlers Cabin, painted in Saskatchewan, Canada

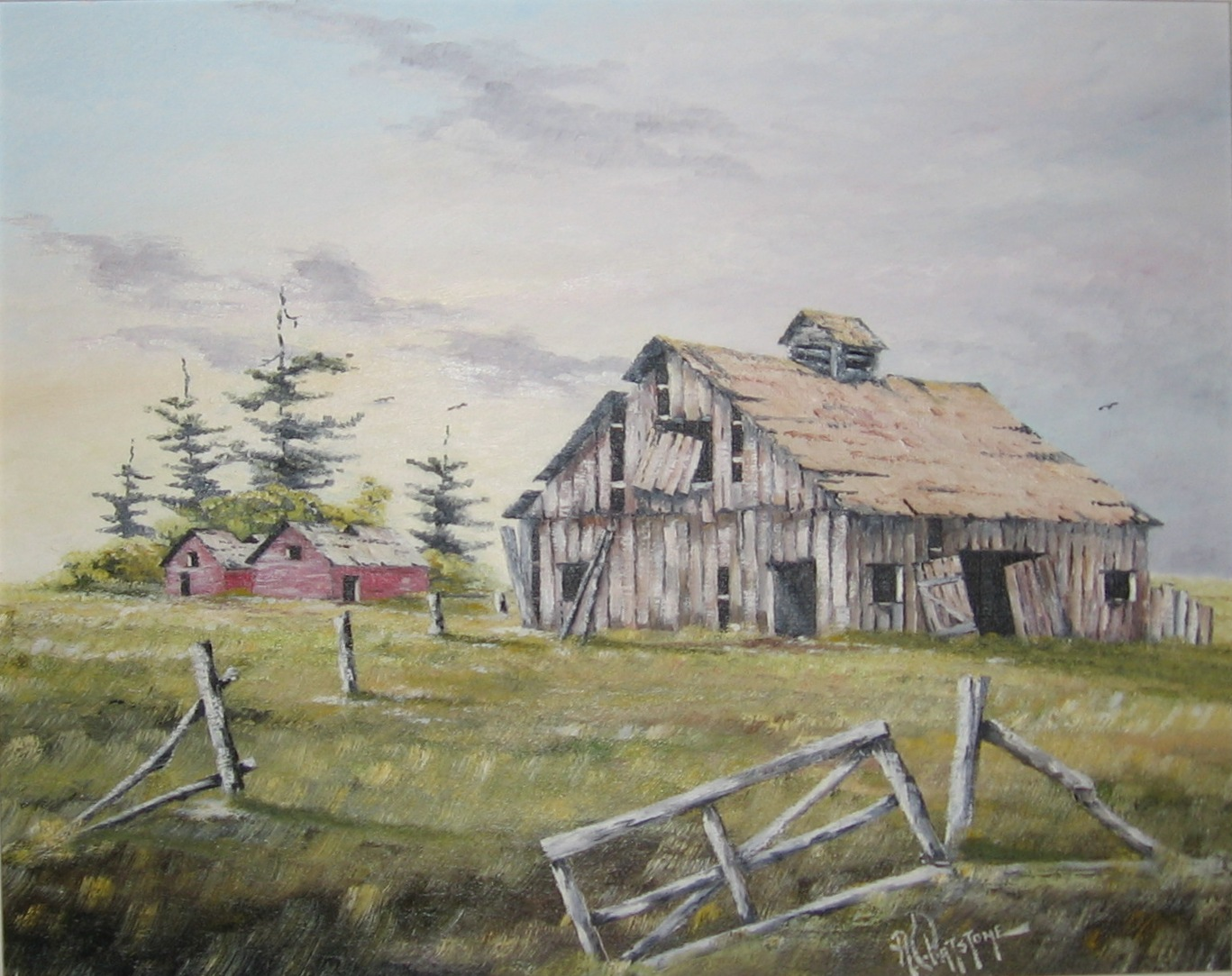
Alfred C. Patstone, Prairie Companions, painted in Alberta, Canada

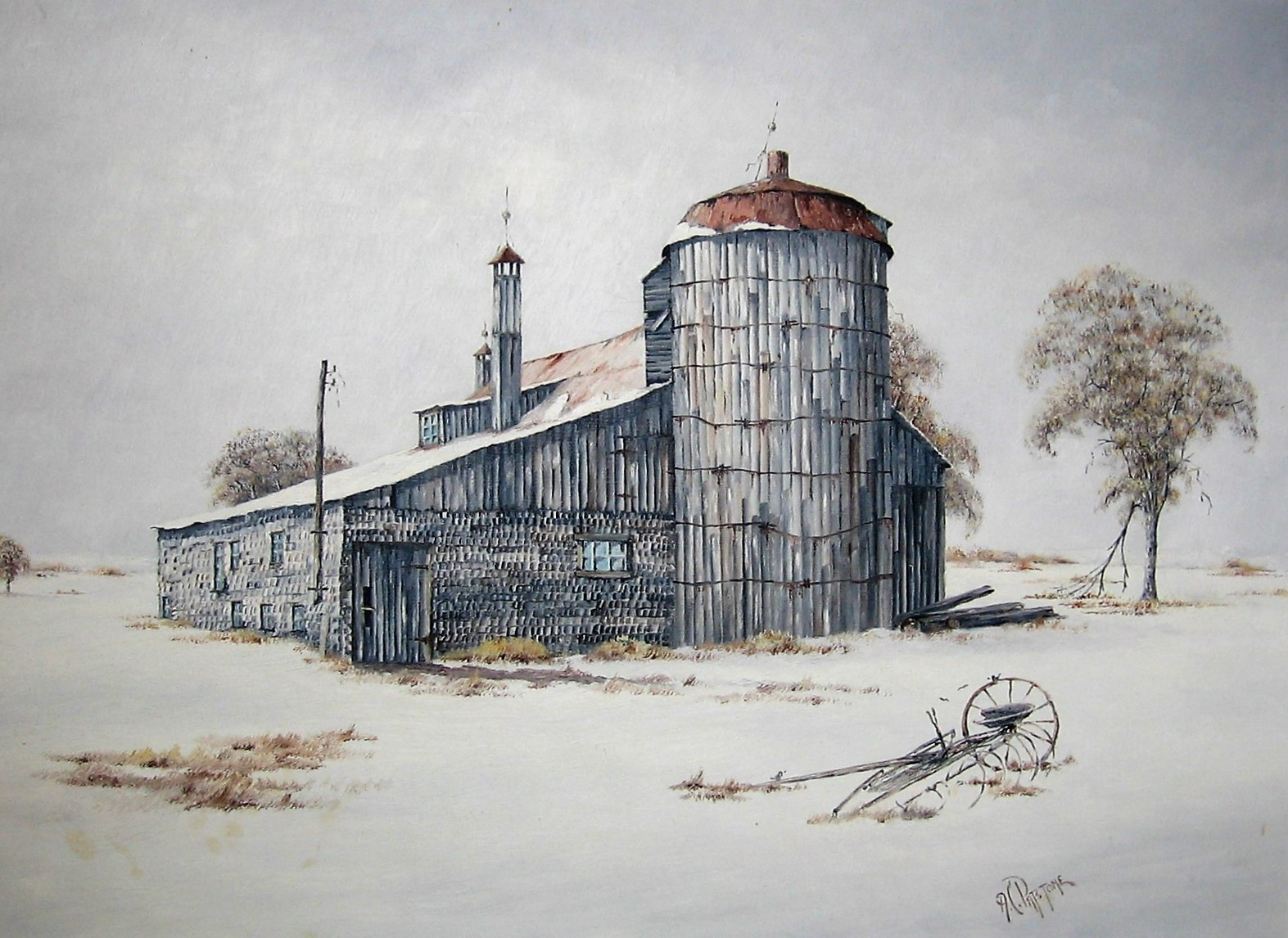
Alfred C. Patstone, Past is Present, painted in Quebec, Canada 1979

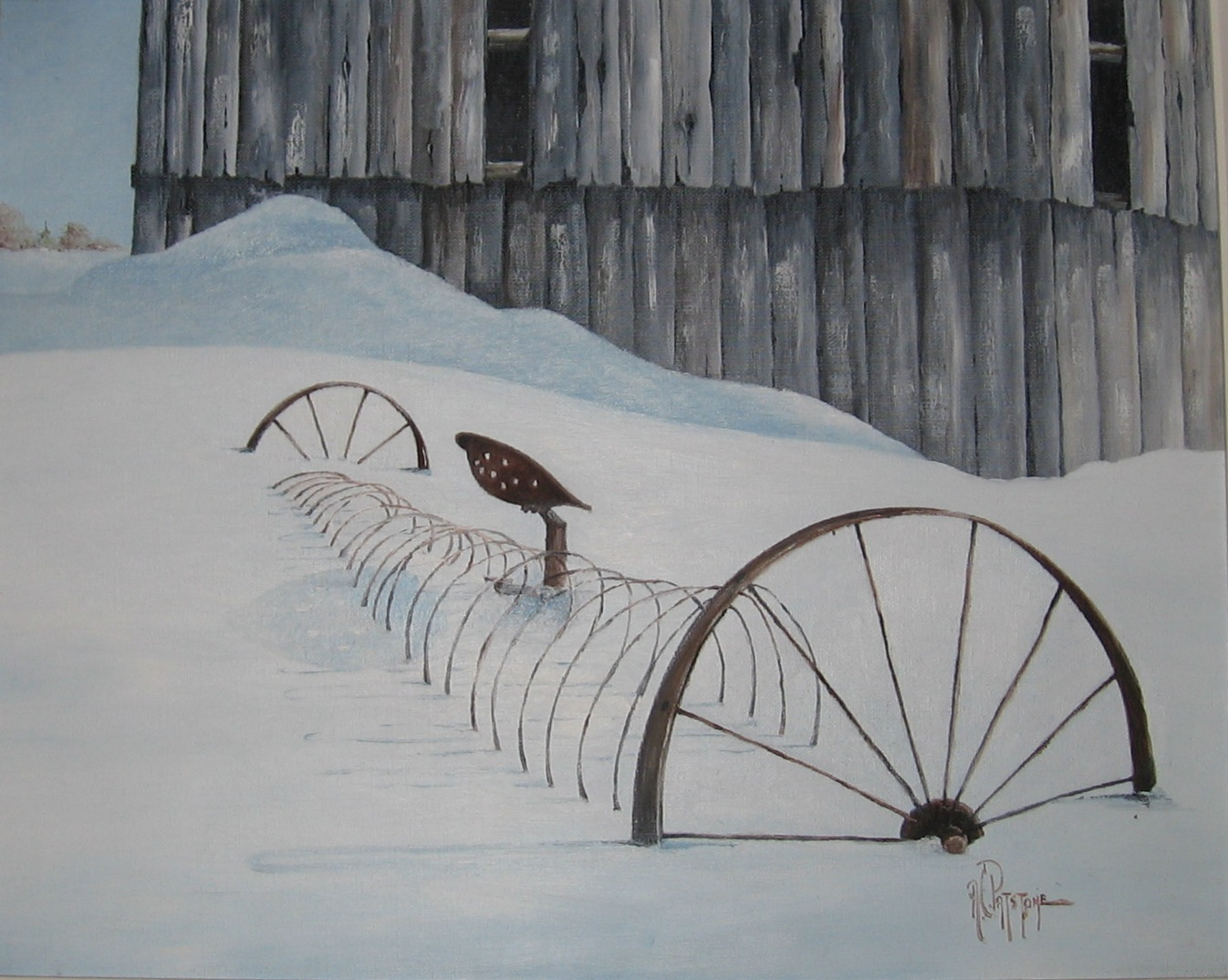
Alfred C. Patstone, Past is Present, painted in Quebec, Canada 1979

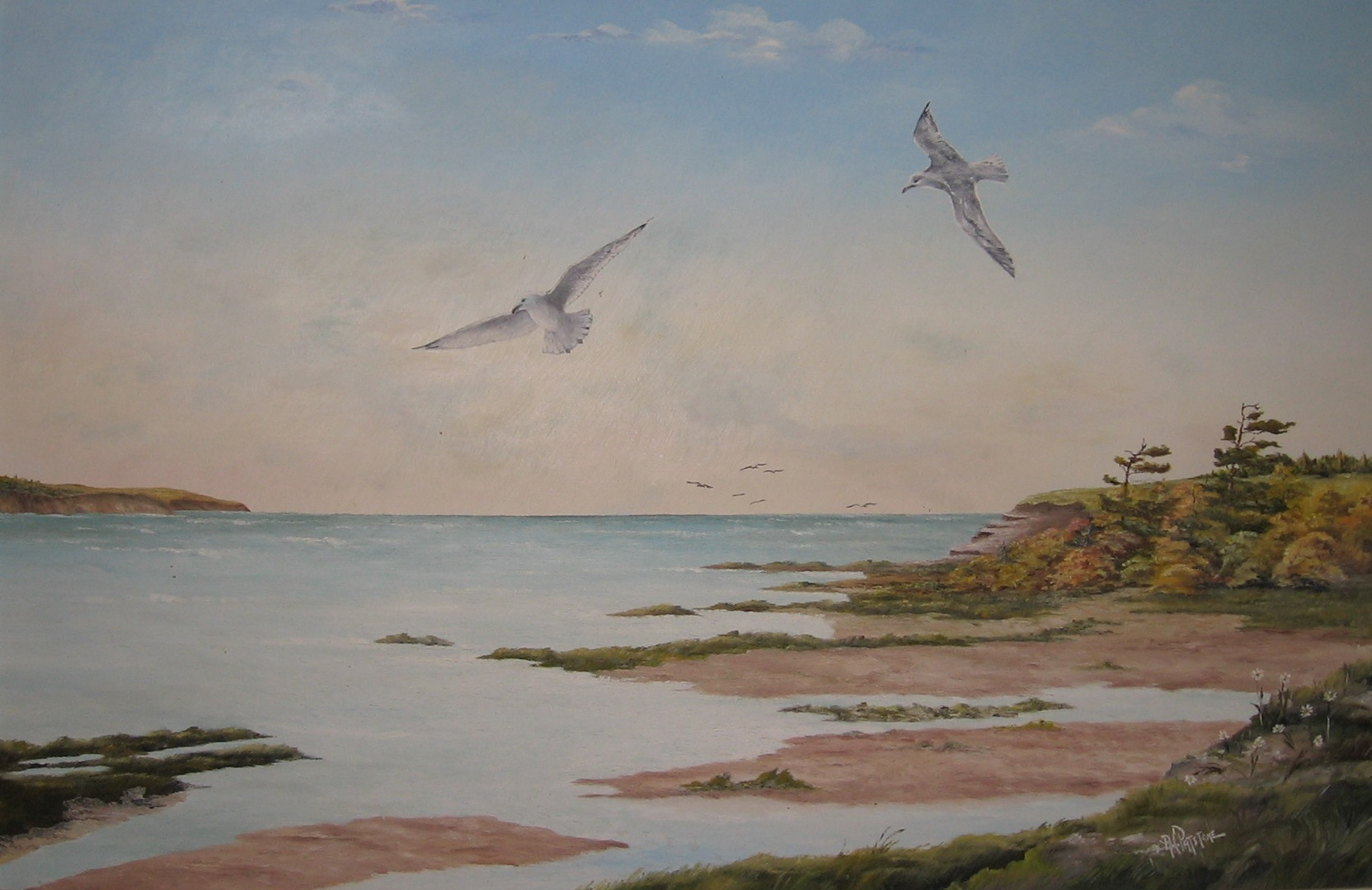
Dawn Flight – Two Seagulls, painted in Nova Scotia

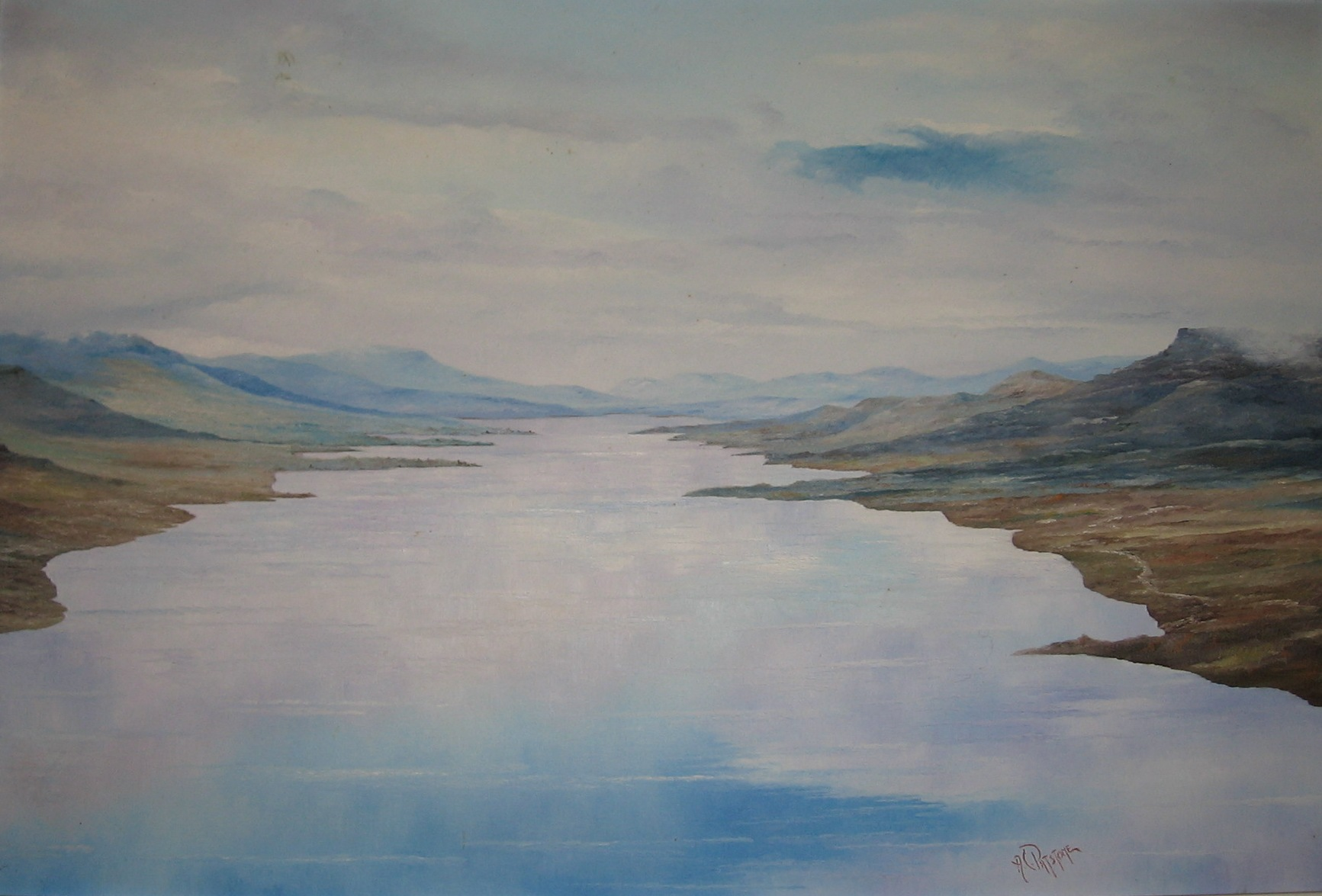
Alfred C. Patstone, Yukon Sky, painted near Dawson, YK

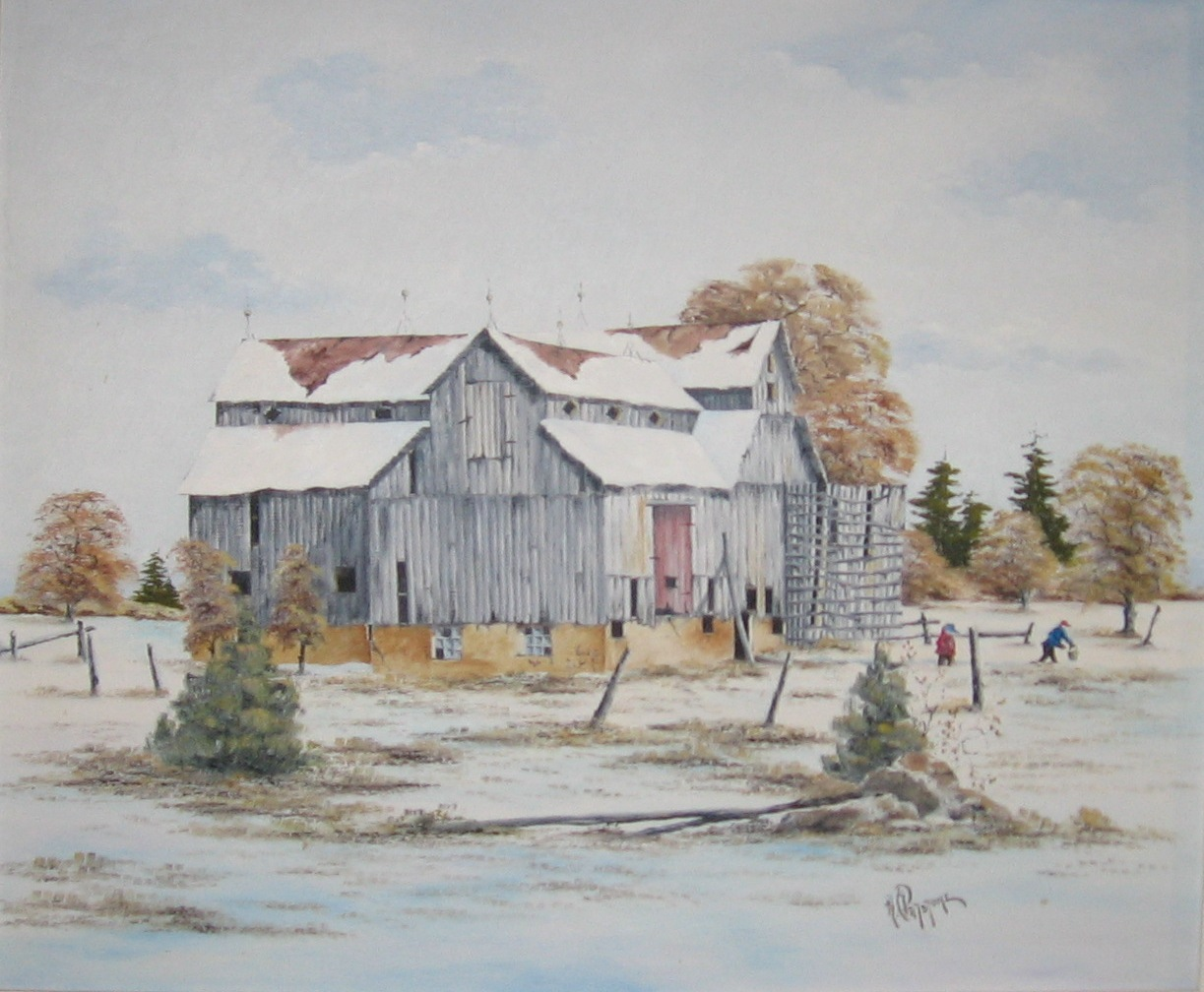
Alfred C. Patstone, Posts and Rails, painted near Ottawa 1975

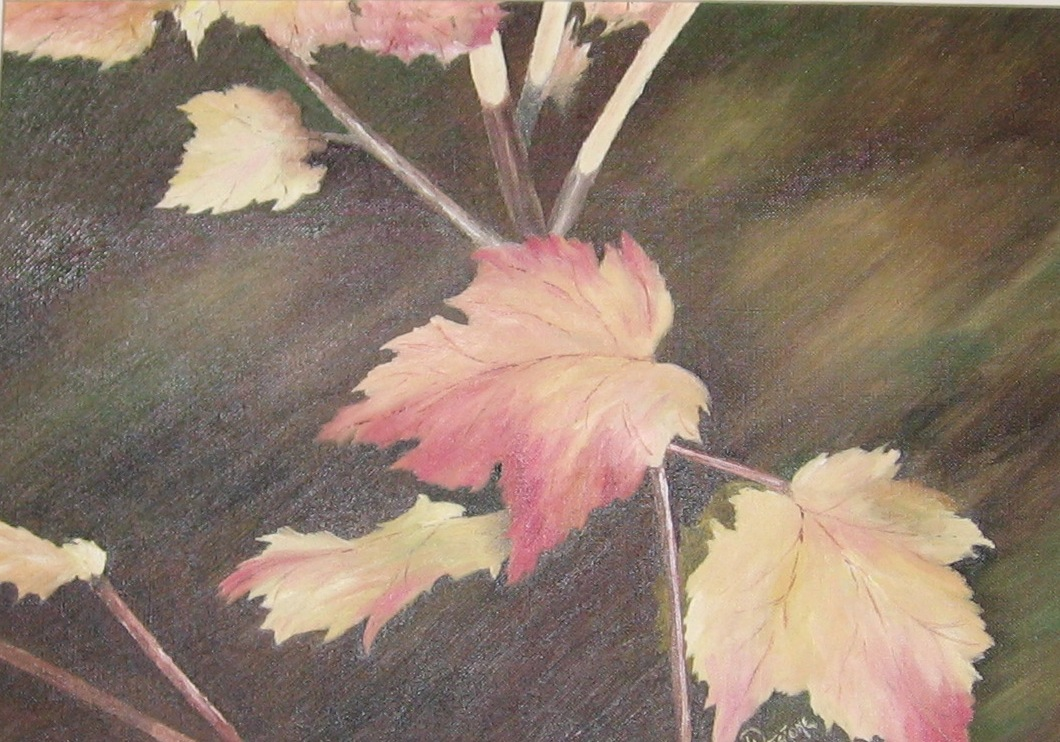
Alfred C. Patstone, Canada Maple, painted in Nova Scotia

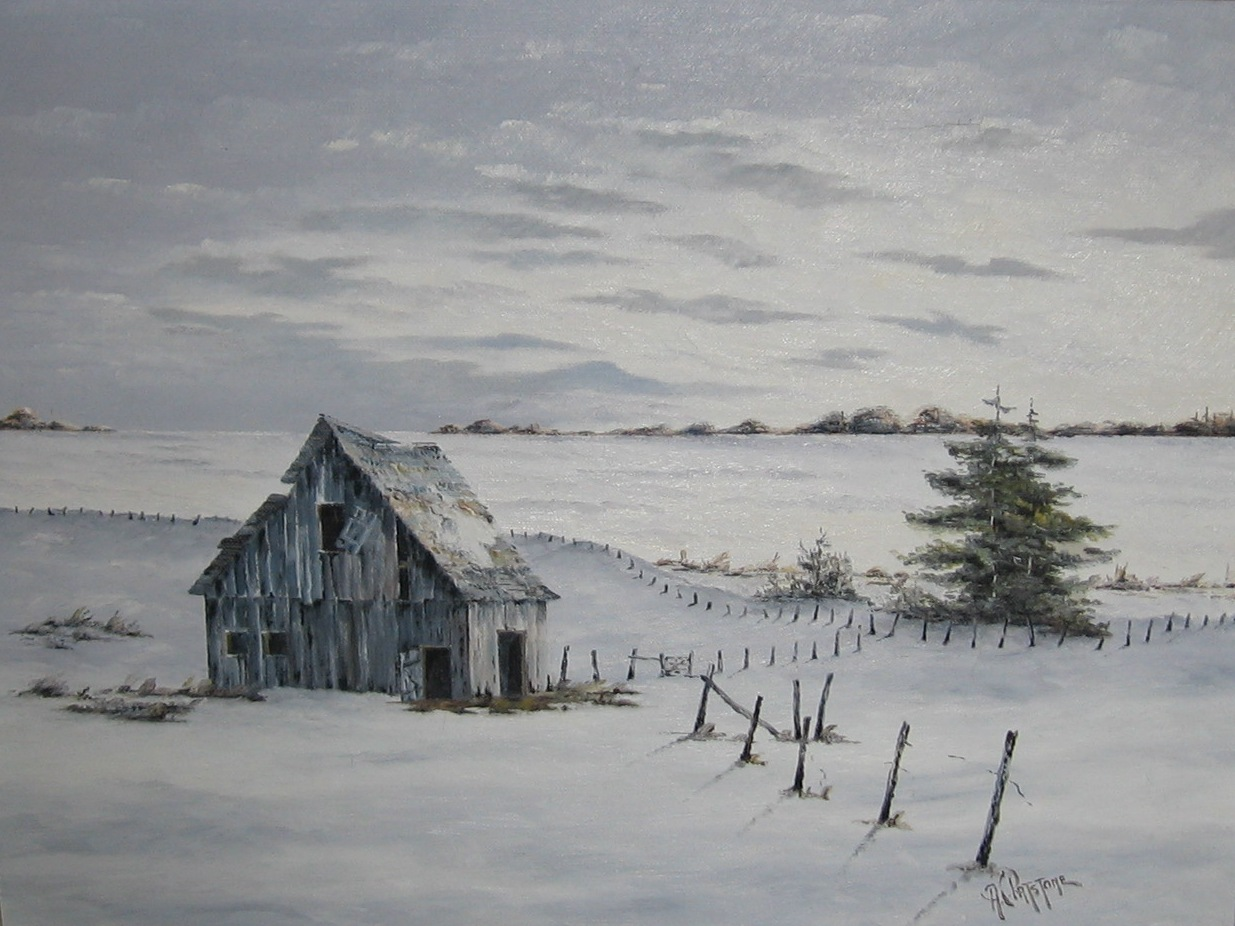
Alfred C. Patstone, Snow at Dawn, painted in PEI

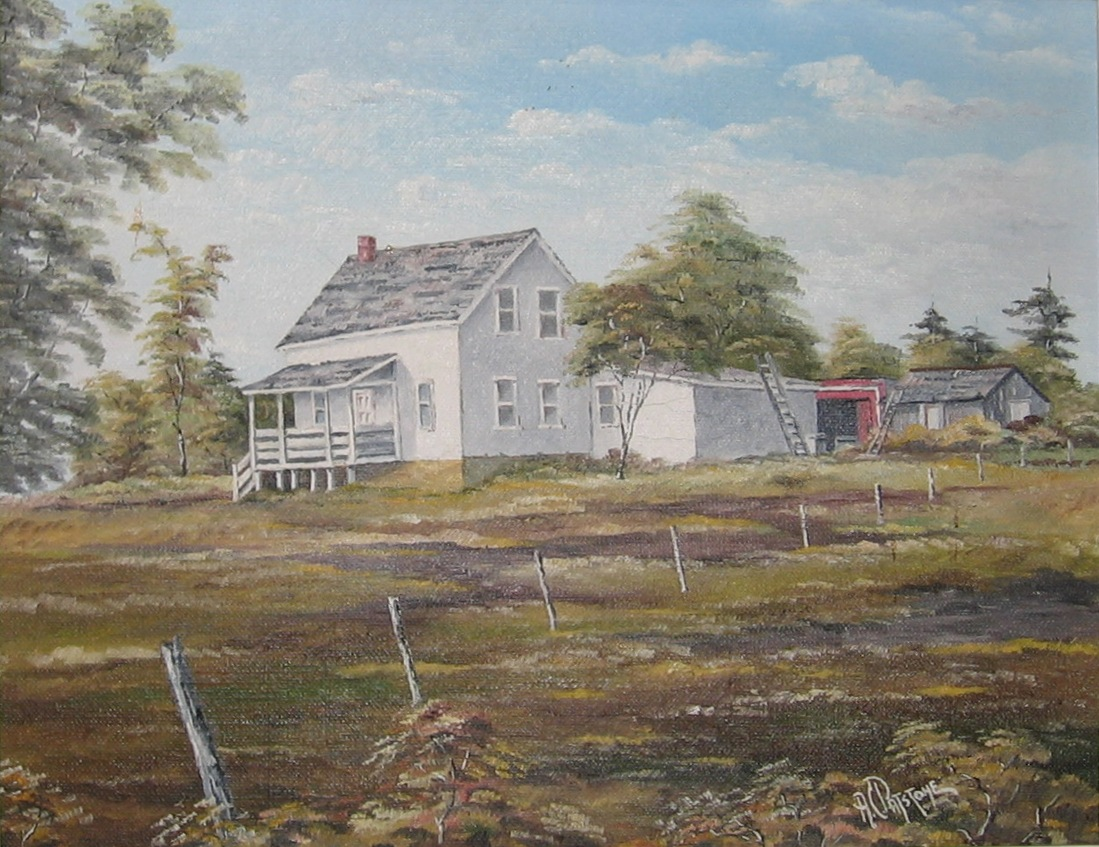
Alfred C. Patstone, Farmhouse, painted in New Brunswick

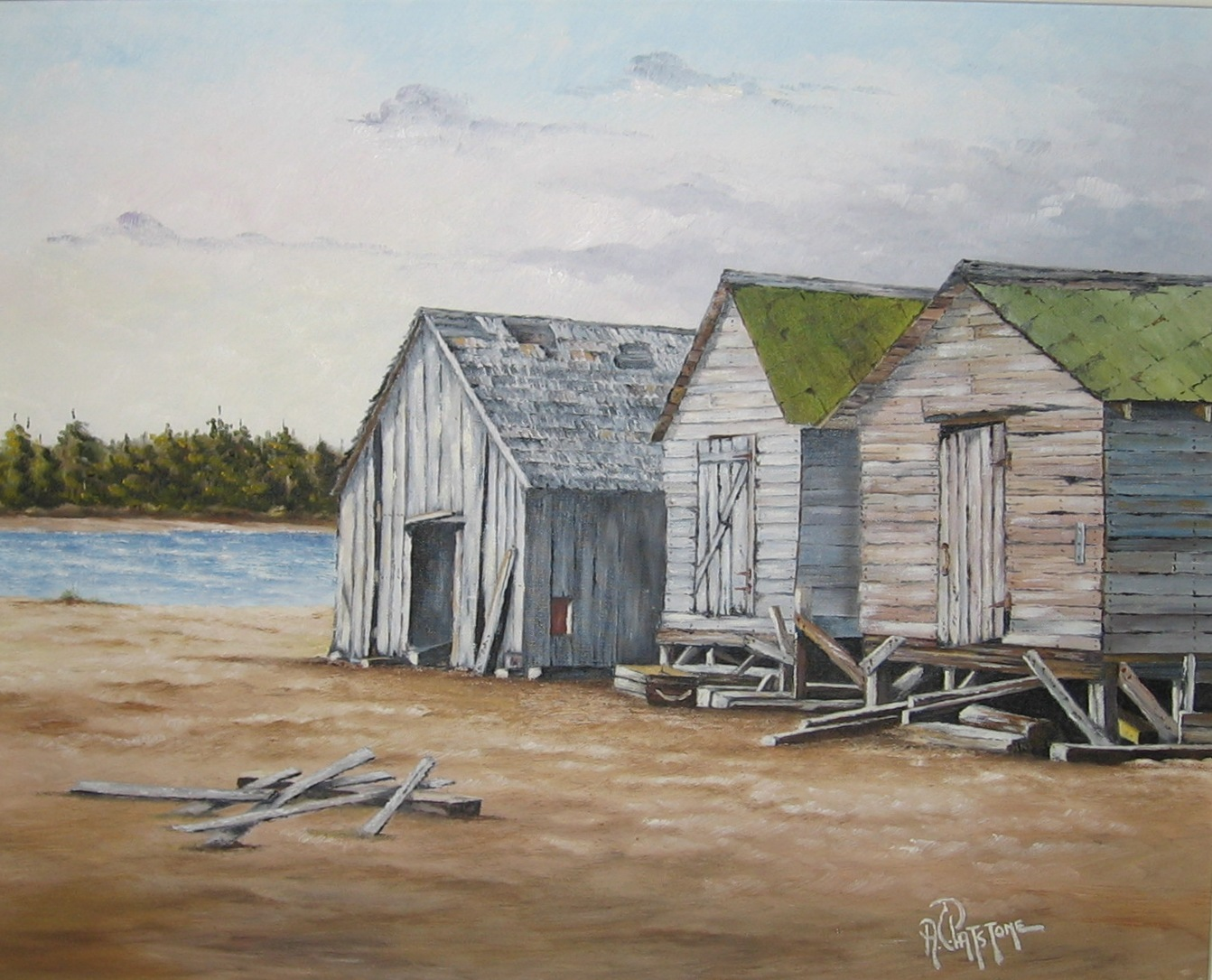
Alfred C. Patstone, Fishing Shacks, painted in PEI

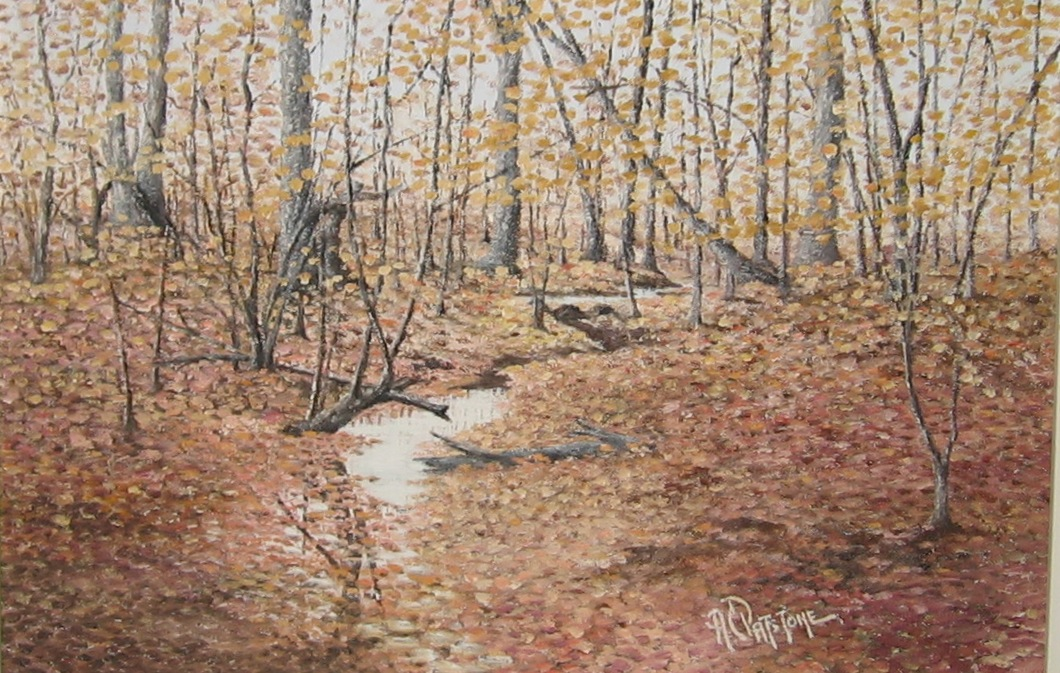
Alfred C. Patstone, Autumn Leaves, painted in Ontario 1990

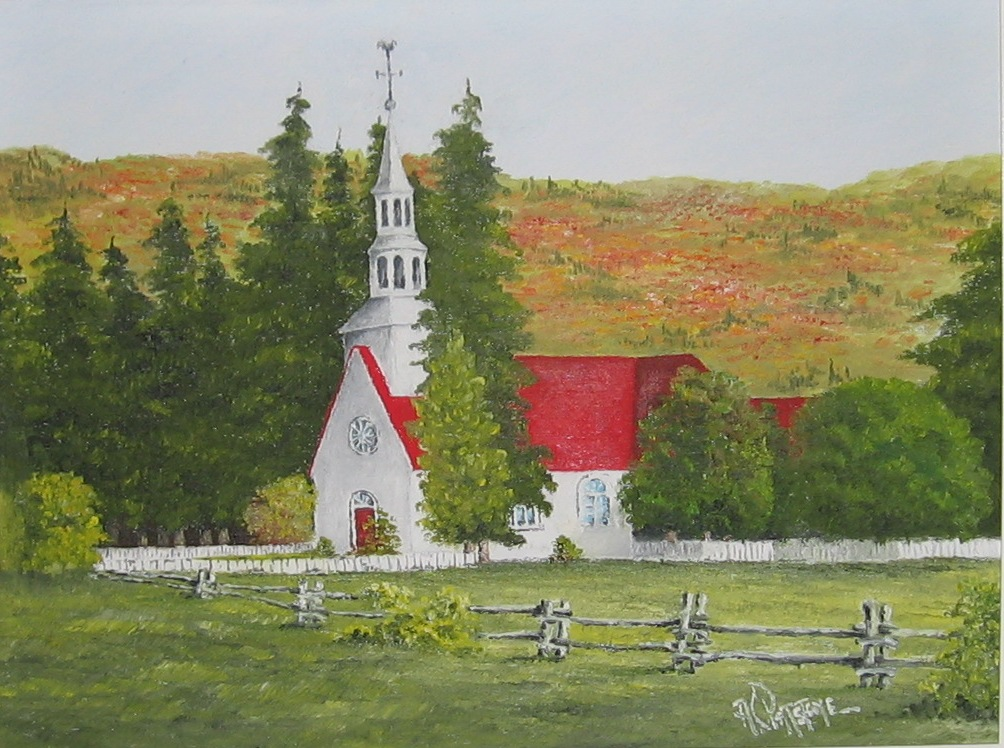
Alfred C. Patstone, Church in the Wild Wood, painted in Mont-Tremblant

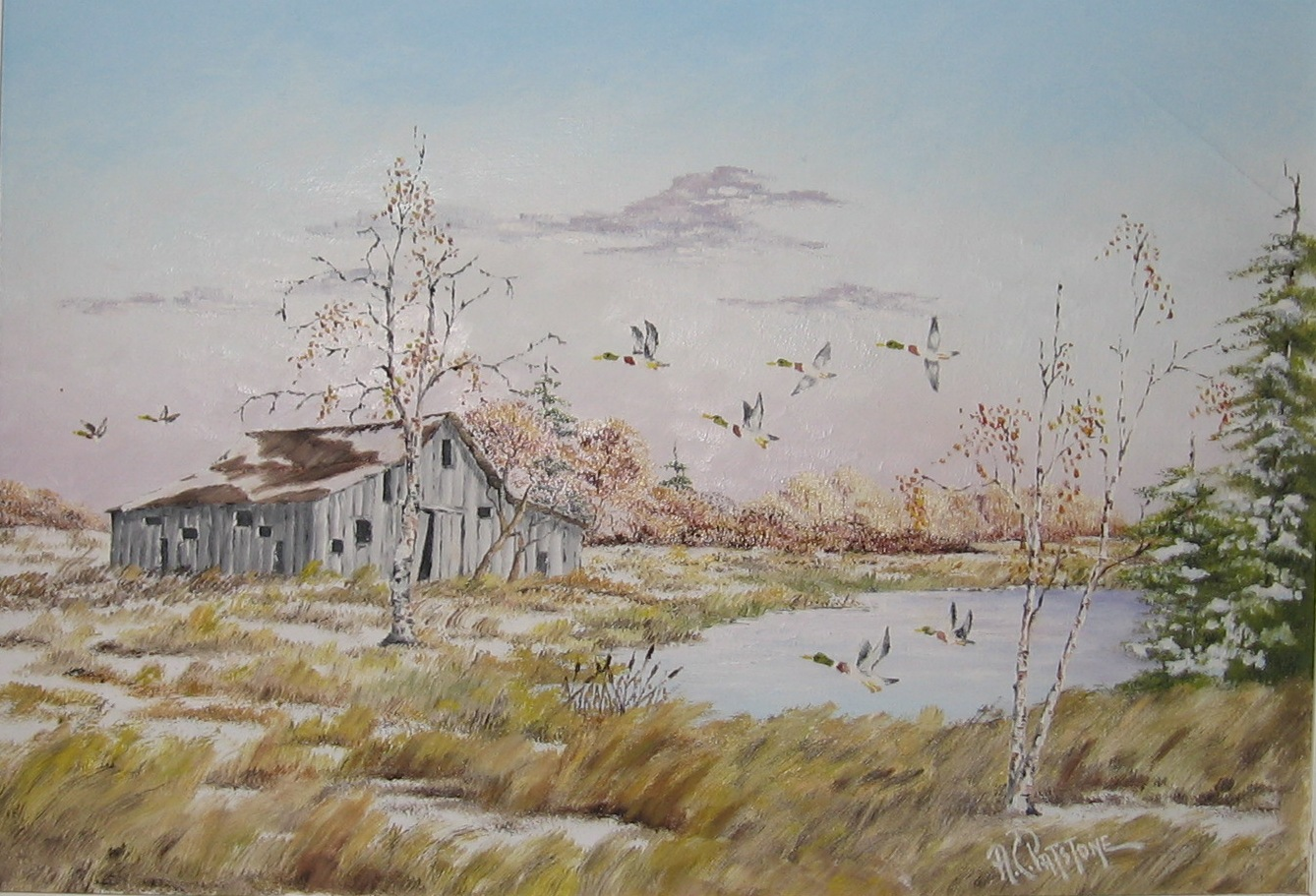
Alfred C. Patstone, Heading South
