= Wasa Lake Provincial Park =

Provincial park in British Columbia, Canada

- IUCN category II (national park)
- Location within British Columbia
- Interactive map of Wasa Lake Provincial Park
- Location: British Columbia, Canada
- Nearest city: Cranbrook
- Coordinates: 49°47′21″N 115°44′14″W
- Area: 1.54 km^{2} (0.59 sq mi)
- Established: October 4, 1954
- Governing body: BC Parks

Wasa Lake Provincial Park is a provincial park in southeastern British Columbia, Canada.
