= Berge Missakian =

Canadian artist

Berge Missakian (1933–2017) was an Egyptian-Canadian artist. He was born in Alexandria, Egypt, of Armenian heritage and studied in Beirut and New York before settling in Montreal, Quebec, Canada, from 1962 until his death in 2017.

Missakian studied at American University of Beirut, Cornell University in Ithaca, New York, and at Concordia University in Montreal.

The collection of his 15 paintings, Colors of a Genocide, is at the Armenian Library and Museum of America in Watertown, Massachusetts, US.
