= Lillian Prest Ferguson =

Canadian painter

- Born: Lillian Gertrude Prest; August 18, 1867; Windsor, Ontario, Canada
- Died: February 1, 1955 (aged 87); Los Angeles, US
- Resting place: Forest Lawn Memorial Park

Lillian Prest Ferguson (August 18, 1867 - February 1, 1955) was a Canadian-born painter known for her involvement and influence on the California art community.

Lillian Prest Ferguson was born August 18, 1867, in Windsor, Ontario. Her father, Thomas Prest, was a bank and real estate broker and her mother, Sarah Smith, was the daughter of Guelph, Ontario's first mayor. Her parents moved the family to the Northwest and was sent to school at a convent in St. Boniface, Manitoba, where she first received art training. At the age of 16 she was commissioned to create portraits of the parents of Archbishop Alexandre-Antonin Taché.

After graduating Ferguson moved to Toronto and continued studying art under John Wycliffe Lowes Forster. She later returned to Winnipeg, where she taught at the Winnipeg Art School. She married lawyer Peter Ferguson in 1886 and the couple traveled several times to Europe. She studied portraiture at the Académie Julian and later in Holland.

The Fergusons moved to California in 1887 and received citizenship in 1892. Together they had three children: Dorothy, Warren and Harold. She lived in Riverdale for several years before moving to Los Angeles. While in California, Ferguson continued her studies including a summer course in Camel studying with William Merritt Chase and later at the University of Southern California with William Lees Judson. Following her husband's death she lived in Laguna Beach for a decade. Ferguson was married for a second time to Albert E. Tanberg, a retired business man, in 1928 and the couple relocated to Los Angeles.

In addition to portraiture, Ferguson was known for California themed paintings of florals and missions, as well as for her pottery work. She was a charter member of the Laguna Beach Art Association and was a founder of the Women Painters of the West. Ferguson also operated one of the first pottery kilns in Laguna Beach. Of her impact on the Laguna Beach art community The San Bernardino County Sun referred to her in 1928 as "a talented painter and craftsman of great skill who loved and painted spots of Laguna Beach long before colonies and galleries were thought of in the then quiet spot."

Ferguson died February 1, 1955, and was buried in Forest Lawn Memorial Park in Glendale, California.
