= Mary Scott (Canadian artist) =

Canadian artist based in Calgary (born 1948)

- Born: 1948 (age 76–77); Calgary, Alberta
- Education: University of Alberta, Calgary (BFA, 1978) Nova Scotia College of Art and Design, Halifax (MFA, 1980)

Mary Scott (born 1948) is a Canadian artist based in Calgary who has worked with painting, fibre, new media and computer programming in her art practice.

Scott has participated in a variety of group exhibitions including She Writes in White Ink (1985) at the Walter Phillips Gallery, Banff; Songs of Experience (1986) at the National Gallery of Canada, Ottawa; Active Surplus (1987) at the Power Plant, Toronto; and The Body and Society (1988) at the Embassy Cultural House, London, Ontario. Her solo exhibitions include shows at the Whyte Museum of the Canadian Rockies, Banff (1985); the Dunlop Gallery, Regina (1986); and Gallery 1.1.1., Winnipeg (1987). She was a co-founder in 1985 of the Stride Gallery in Calgary.

Scott is quoted as saying "I have no interest in a monologue with respect to my work. I'm very interested in dialogue, in discourse and the polyvocal. The monologue which is plunked on the wall or plunked on the floor is very unsatisfactory to me."

Scott's work embraces text as a central player in its performance. One half of her installation, "Hearing Voices", drapes words constructed from oil paint over her personal book collection. The text for this piece comes from Scott's first novel, which was inspired by the writings of Gertrude Stein. This text is a product of "smashing", according to Scott. "I did this a lot in the late ’70s, where I would go in and take from one or two writers and 'smash' [their work] together." Scott cites Stein as a continuous influence on her practice, and says Stein's writing is also responsible for her foray into aural territory. "My practice is painting, but a lot (of my work) has never had a dot of paint on it. People will say, ‘Oh my god, how can you call this painting? It doesn't have paint on it?’ And I'll say, ‘What do you think it's talking to?’ It's talking to that discourse in history and is arguing with that history."
