= Ethel Ogden =

Canadian painter (1869–1902)

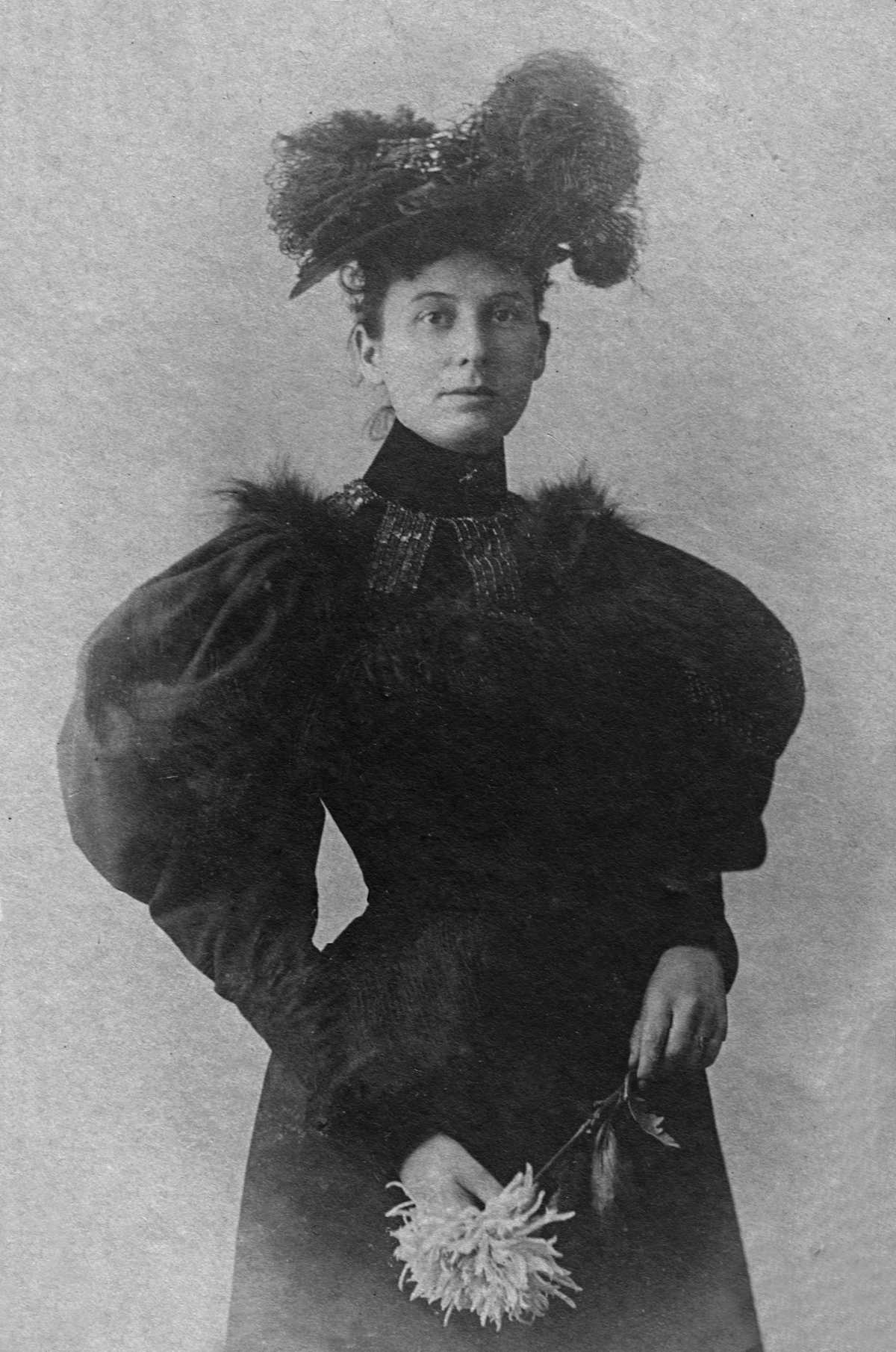
- Born: Sarah Ethel Ogden; 22 March 1869; Sackville, New Brunswick, Canada
- Died: 3 March 1902 (aged 32); Sackville, New Brunswick, Canada
- Education: Mount Allison University
- Known for: visual artist, educator

Sarah Ethel Ogden (1869–1902) was a Canadian painter and educator. She was central to developing china painting within the Fine Arts Department at the Mount Allison Ladies' College in Sackville, New Brunswick. Her work and contributions have been brought to light through recent research, scholarship and exhibitions.

== Life and career ==
Sarah Ethel Ogden was born in Sackville, New Brunswick, in 1869 to shipbuilder and mill owner William Ogden and Alice Chase Barnes. The eldest of three sisters, Ogden grew up within an artistic family. Her mother, Alice Chase Barnes studied art in the first class of the Mount Allison University Female Academy, known as the Ladies' College, receiving a Token of Merit in 1857. She went on to teach in the art department from 1859 to 1863.

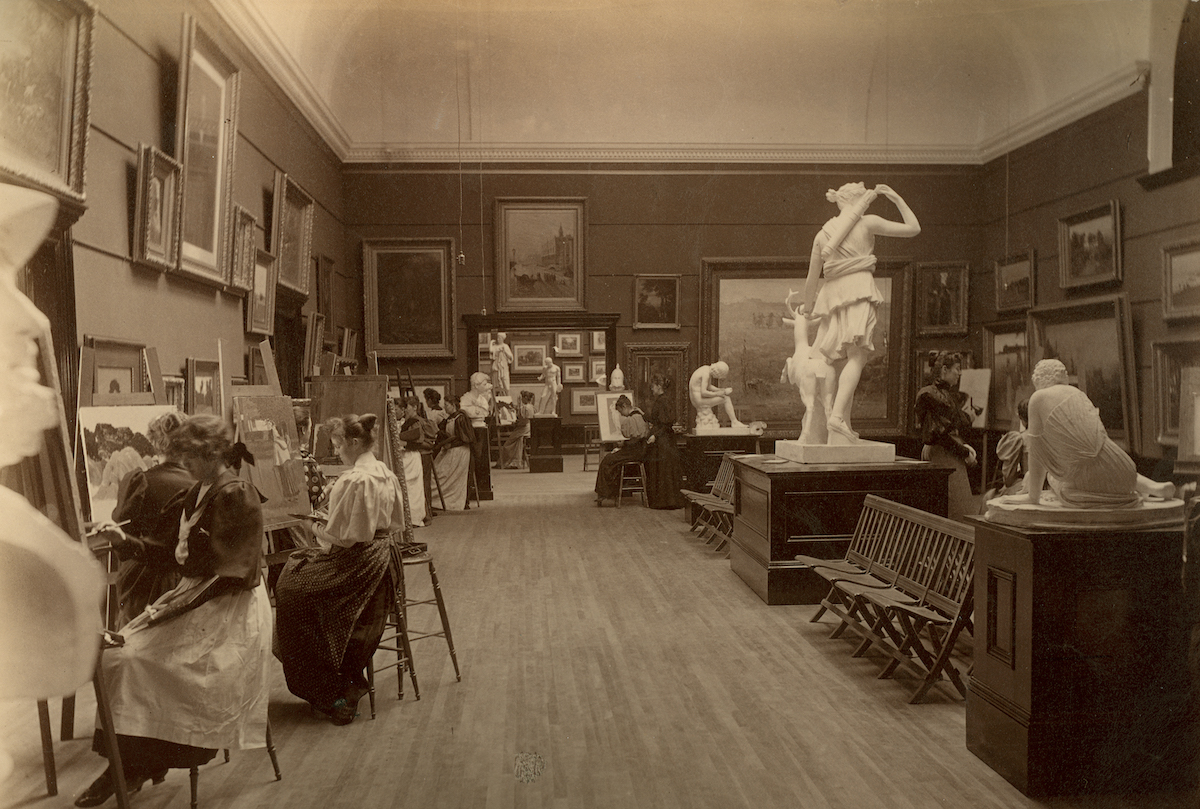
Mount Allison Ladies’ College class, central gallery, Owens Museum of Fine Arts, Sackville, NB, 1895; Ethel Ogden standing, right.

Ogden enrolled at the Mount Allison Ladies' College in 1883 at the age of fourteen. In 1888, she left the Ladies' College for the Owens Art Institution in Saint John, New Brunswick where she studied with Montreal artist, John Hammond. Citing financial difficulties, the Owens Art Institution closed in 1892 and its significant teaching collection was transferred to Mount Allison where John Hammond was hired as head of the art department. There is evidence to suggest that it was Ogden who brought forward the idea of transferring the Owens Art Institution collection to Mount Allison, which resulted in the establishment of the Owens Art Gallery.

In 1893, Ogden returned to the Ladies' College to complete her final year of study and in the same year also began teaching. The following year she was appointed to a full-time teaching position.

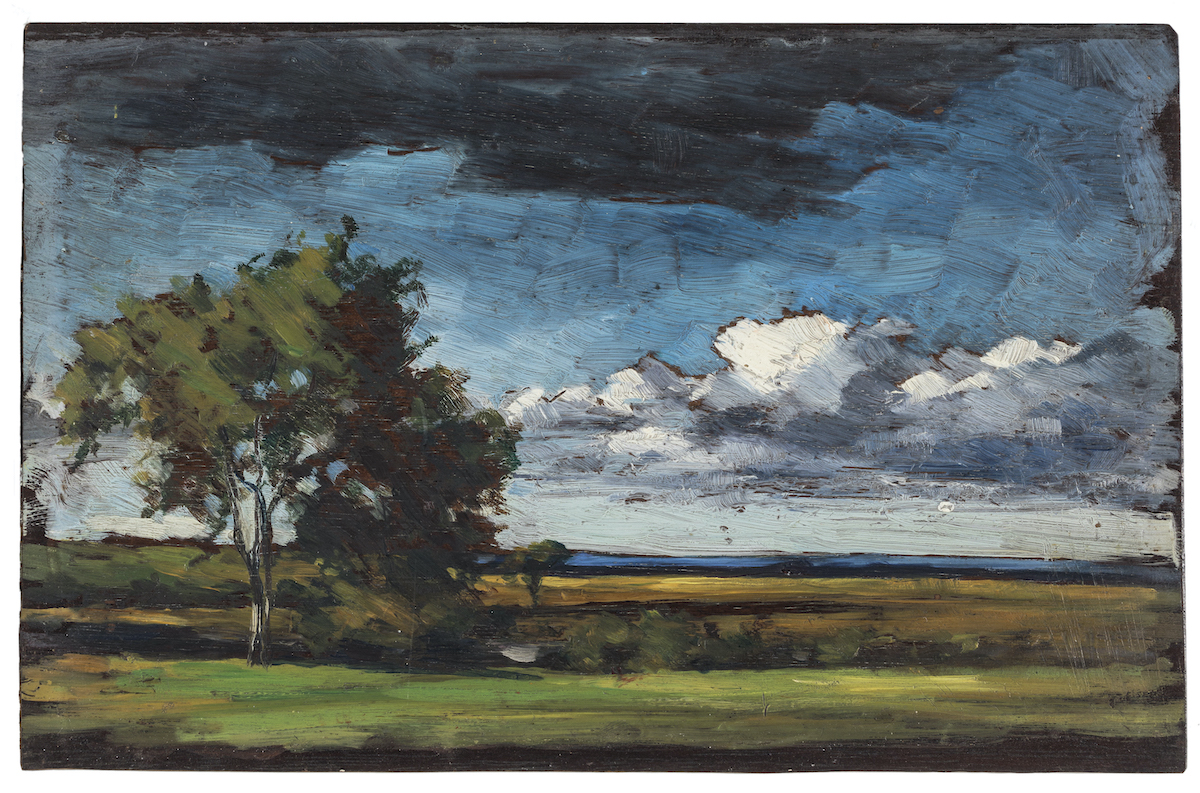
Ethel Ogden, Untitled, n.d., oil on mahogany board 21.1 × 13.7 cm. Collection of the Owens Art Gallery. Gift of the family of Clementina Godfrey

Ogden painted primarily landscapes and still lifes, including floral studies. Her painting style is described by curator Gemey Kelly as, "modernist", noting how the artist's handling of paint serves to "partially break down the function of the paint as purely representational, drawing attention to its mass and materiality."

In 1897, Ogden exhibited a painting in the Women's Art Association of Canada exhibition at Roberts' Gallery in Toronto, ON.

Ogden died in Sackville in 1902 of phthisis at the age of 32.

Ogden's work and contributions have been brought to light through recent research, scholarship and exhibitions. Her work has been the subject of two significant exhibitions. The first, Ethel Ogden curated by Gemey Kelly and Fredette Frame was presented at the Owens Art Gallery at Mount Allison University in 1999. The second, The Matter at Hand: Paintings and Hand-painted China by Ethel Ogden, curated by Gemey Kelly and Jane Tisdale was presented at the Owens Art Gallery in 2018. Ethel Ogden's hand-painted china was examined in the exhibition, Ethel Ogden & Greta Ogden: Painted Porcelain 1889-1938, curated by Jane Tisdale in 2011.

Ogden's sisters, Greta Submit Ogden (1875–1939) and Mary Haliburton (Burtie) Ogden (1878–1941) also pursued the arts. Greta Ogden studied and taught art at the Ladies' College and became a pioneer in the field of arts-based occupational therapy. Mary Haliburton Ogden studied music.

The Ogden Memorial Prize established in memory of Ogden, her mother Alice Chase Barnes, and sister Greta Submit is awarded each year to a student in Fine Arts at Mount Allison University.

== Hand-painted china ==
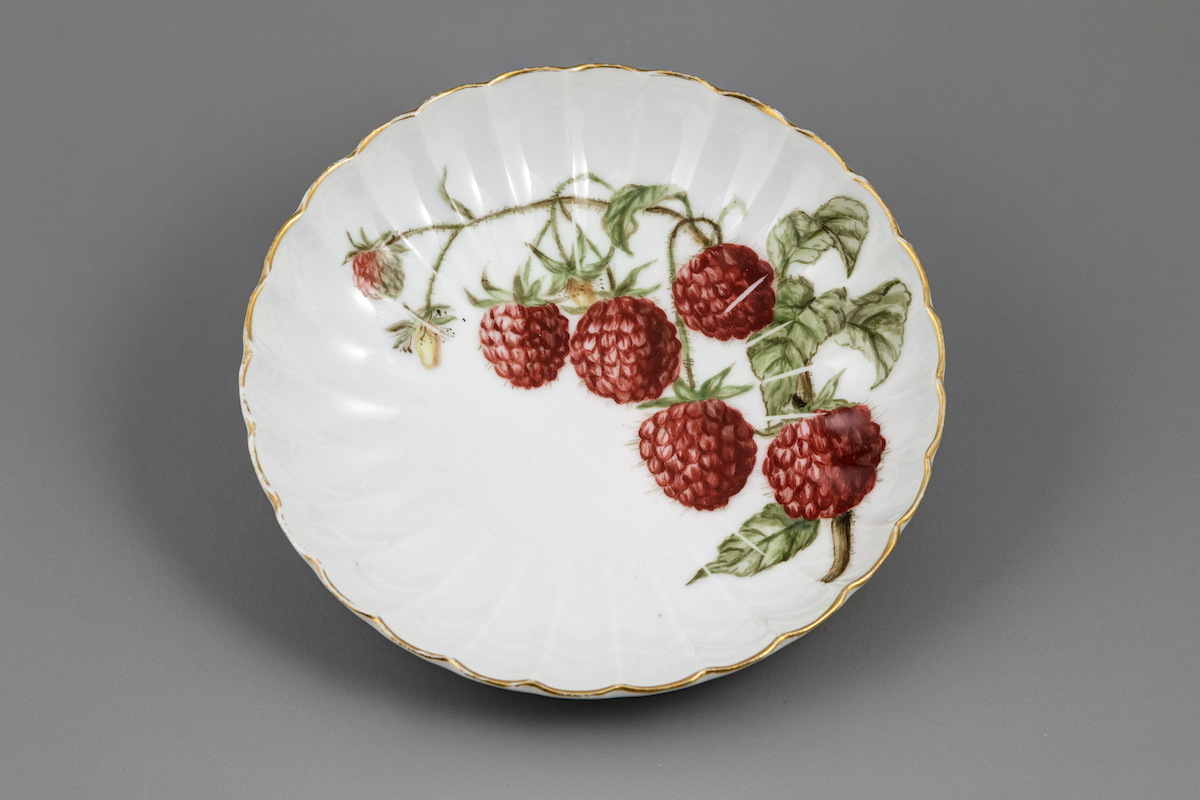
Ethel Ogden, Fruit plate, 1889, hand-painted porcelain, diameter: 14.3 cm. Collection of the Owens Art Gallery. Gift of Gerda, Joanna, and Susannah Parlee.

Ogden was central to developing china painting within the Fine Arts Department at the Mount Allison Ladies' College. China painting was added to the Ladies' College curriculum in 1887 and Ogden was teaching china painting in 1895. In 1897, Ogden travelled to New York to study china painting with "one of the best masters in the metropolis ... aiming to keep abreast of the very newest ideas in that line."

In 2014, Canadian artist Gisele Amantea created a major site-specific work titled Remember the Ladies (Version 1), based on motifs in hand-painted china by Ogden in the Owens Art Gallery permanent collection. This work was part of the MASS MoCA exhibition Oh, Canada and installed at the Owens Art Gallery as part of the Maritime version of the exhibition. In 2017, Amantea created Remember the Ladies (Version 2), which was included in the group exhibition Fabrications at the Kelowna Art Gallery in Kelowna, British Columbia.

== Collections ==
- Owens Art Gallery, Mount Allison University
