= François Beaucourt =

Canadian artist (1740-1794)

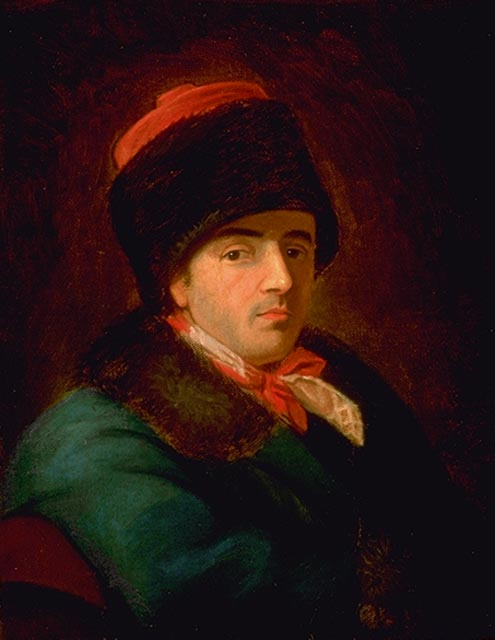
- Self-portrait c. 1773–1786
- Born: 1740; Laprairie, Quebec, Canada
- Died: 1794 (aged 53–54)
- Occupation: Painter

François Beaucourt (1740–1794) is said to be the first native-born Canadian painter who studied in France with a professional reputation. He was active mainly in the Province of Quebec.

== Career ==
François Malepart Beaucourt was born in Laprairie, Quebec. Paul Beaucourt, his father, was an amateur painter and military engineer. After he died, the family seems to have returned to France. In 1773, Beaucourt married the daughter of his painting master, Joseph Camagne, in Bordeaux, afterwards painting in France and Russia. He was accepted into the local academy in Bordeaux in 1784. In Canada, after 1786, he painted a wide variety of subjects, mostly portraits, including a self-portrait in the National Gallery of Canada. In 1792, he worked in Philadelphia but returned to Montreal that year. In 1794, he died in Montreal. One critic speaks of his "decorative and light provincial rococo" manner.
