= Katja MacLeod Kessin =

German-Canadian artist

- Born: February 7, 1959; Hamburg
- Died: April 1, 2006 (aged 47); Montreal, Canada
- Known for: painter
- Spouse: Darcy MacLeod
- Website: katjamacleodkessin.com

Katja MacLeod Kessin (1959–2006) was a German-born Canadian painter.

== Biography ==
Kessin was born on February 7, 1959 in Hamburg, Germany. Around 1980 she emigrated to Montreal, Canada. She studied art at Concordia University, earning an MFA degree in painting 1993, and a PhD in Humanities in 2003.

Kessin taught art at Concordia, including teaching art to non-artists. She also created an art program for women and children at a women’s shelter in Montreal. In 2000 she received a national award of merit given by the Senior Women Academic Administrators of Canada.

Kessin died on April 1, 2006, in Montreal. In 2007 a retrospective of her work was presented at the FOFA Gallery at Concordia University.

Her work is in the collection of the Musée national des beaux-arts du Québec.

== Personal ==
Kessin was married to Darcy MacLeod with whom she had three children.
