= Cheryl Ruddock =

Canadian-American painter (born 1949)

Cheryl K. Ruddock (born 1949) is an American-born Canadian painter from Guelph, Ontario, who has exhibited widely for over 30 years. Working extensively with oil on canvas and gouache on handmade paper, she is known for using layers of colour and exploring the fragility of life, botanical themes, and empty-bodied clothing. Her work is held in the Canada Council Art Bank and the Kitchener-Waterloo Art Gallery, as well as collections of the University of Waterloo Art Gallery, Macdonald Stewart Art Centre, and the University of Guelph.

Her recent exhibitions have included Colour Possibilities at the Renann Isaacs Contemporary, Guelph; and Harmonics at Gallery Stratford, in 2016. A career survey of her work, entitled Slip, was held at the Macdonald Stewart Art Centre, now the Art Gallery of Guelph, in 2010.

== Early life and education ==
Ruddock was born in Detroit, Michigan, and studied painting with Ruth Weisberg at Eastern Michigan University in Ypsilanti, Michigan. She moved to Canada in 1969, and studied art history at Carleton University in Ottawa.

She lived in various locations including Toronto, Montreal, and the Yukon, settling in Guelph in 1980. During this period of her life, she was focused on weaving. In 1986, she earned a bachelor's degree in fine arts from the University of Guelph in Ontario, Canada.

== Career ==
Her paintings and prints belong to the following public collections: The Canada Council Art Bank, The Macdonald Stewart Art Centre, and the University of Guelph Collection. Her work is also held at the Kitchener-Waterloo Art Gallery, University of Waterloo Art Gallery, Glenhyrst, The Art Gallery of Hamilton, and the Art Gallery of Brant.

Her subjects include recurring mythic symbols, such as the female form, empty clothing, and desiccated botanicals.

Ruddock works with oil and acrylic on canvas, including shaped canvas bound to wooden forms. Periodically, she creates monoprints with master printer Stu Oxley at the Riverside Press, in Elora, Ontario.

== Reception ==
A 1991 review of her "Tendered Hearts" exhibition stated, "The Glenhyrst fairly bursts with colors on Ruddock's canvases. The lasting impression is one of sureness, confidence, unapologetic application of color and abstract images."

== Personal life ==
Cheryl is married to Nicholas Ruddock, a physician and author of The Parabolist, published by Doubleday.
