= Bobbie Oliver =

Canadian-American abstract painter (born 1943)

- Born: Roberta Anne Oliver; June 17, 1943 (age 83); Windsor, Ontario, Canada
- Education: Centre for Creative Studies in Detroit, Michigan (1966–1968) and at St. Alban's School of Art, St. Alban's, England (1968)
- Movement: Abstraction
- Spouse: Frank Kitchens (m. 1993)

Roberta Anne Oliver (born June 17, 1943) is a Canadian-American abstract painter.

== Biography ==
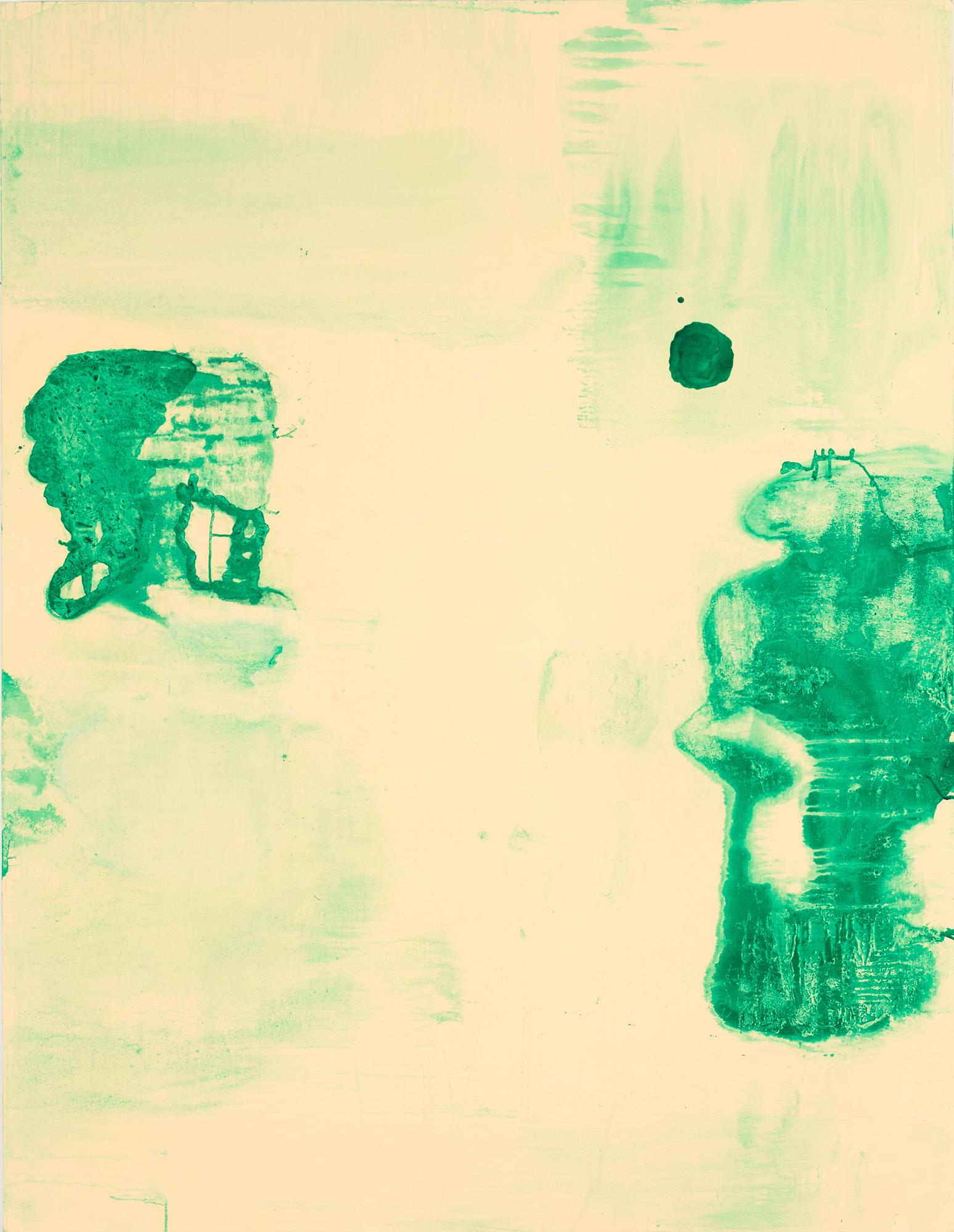
Untitled (2019). Acrylic on canvas, 62" x 80".

After moving to New York from London in 1971, she worked for Isamu Noguchi and La Monte Young. In the 1980s she taught painting at Princeton University, the School of Visual Arts, New York, the Banff School of Fine Arts, Canada and The Rhode Island School of Design where she served as a Tenured Professor of Painting and Chair of Painting (1982–1983 and 2006–2008). She also taught at the National College of Art in Lahore, Pakistan and the Rhode Island School of Design in Rome, Italy.

In the 1980s, she worked almost as a sculptor, building sculpture-like wall reliefs with thick grounds of wax on plywood which she incised with simple geometric forms.

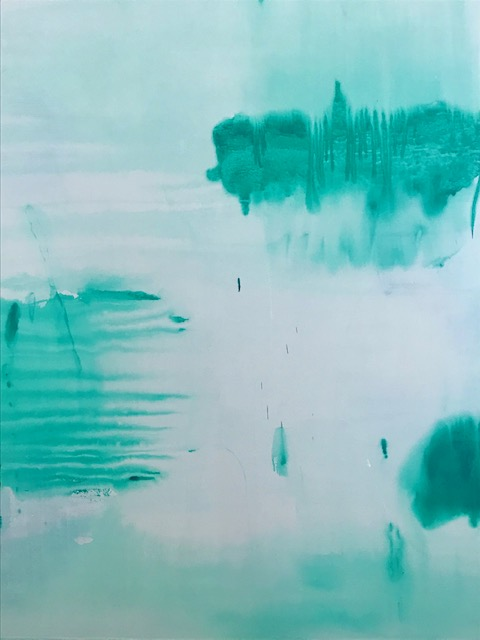
Untitled (2019). Acrylic on canvas, 66" x 78".

In 1999, her painting looked like water with floating shapes. From 2005 on her paintings became more expressionistic. They were built up from layers of opaque washes into luminous monochromes of watery depth which suggested movement. One critic suggested that her influences might be the dream-like works of Surrealism but Oliver said, as always, that these works reflected her own hand working with the material. In 2015, a critic said of her show of mostly green paintings at Valentine Gallery in New York that the tonal play and shapes recalled shadows and reflections, or clouds and sheets of rain. In 2019, a show titled Residuals, of blue paintings created from 2017 to 2019 was shown at High Noon Gallery in New York. They revealed the process by which she made them but viewers and critics persisted in finding images in them.

She has exhibited in New York at High Noon Gallery, Hionas Gallery, Feature Gallery, Showroom, and the Valentine Gallery as well as having solo shows in Toronto at the Olga Korper Gallery (her long-term dealer), in Los Angeles at the Jancar Gallery and in Laguna Beach at The George Gallery.

Oliver lives and works during the winters in New York City and during the summers in a converted church in Rock Valley, New York, which she and her husband, Frank Kitchens, have renovated.
