= John Edmund Strandberg =

Canadian artist (1911–1996)

- Born: Johan Edmund Strandberg; 16 November 1911; Stockholm, Sweden
- Died: 25 August 1996 (aged 84); Ontario, Canada
- Known for: Landscape art
- Movement: Expressionism; Impressionism; Arts and Crafts
- Spouse: Eva Forsberg

John Edmund Strandberg (16 November 1911 Sweden - 25 August 1996 Canada) was a painter born in Brännkyrka, Stockholm County, Sweden who later immigrated to Ontario, Canada.

== Biography ==
Born to Richard Gustaf Karlsson Strandberg and Ingrid Johansson in Brännkyrka, Strandberg began painting when he was still a child. He received his master's degree in Cabinet Making in 1930.

At the onset of World War II he put his career on hold in order to join the Finnish Army.

After the war, he studied with European artists in Stockholm, before immigrating to Toronto, Ontario, Canada, in 1951, with his wife Eva Forsberg and their two daughters Inger and Marianne.

In Canada, he anglicized his name from "Johan" to "John", a common practice among immigrants. He joined the Art Guild of York-Scarborough and studied under artists like Thomas Frederick Haig Chatfield and Arnold Benjamin Hodgkins.

== Work ==
Strandberg was a plein air landscape painter who painted in oils, using a palette knife of his own design. His inspiration was the Canadian landscape. He also did some florals and the occasional portrait.

Strandberg toured Canada, the United States and Europe on solo exhibitions, as well as participating in several art exhibitions, such as The World of Arts and Crafts, United Artists, and The Artists Touring Association, even living in the US for a few years.

== Signature ==
He signed his art as "J. Strandberg". The logo of The Art Guild of York-Scarborough with the initials "J S" is found on the back of some of his works.

== Collections ==
Stranberg's paintings can be found in several institutional collections and other art galleries, banks, insurance companies, and trust companies, as well as in private collections.
