= Marie-Denise Douyon =

Canadian painter, illustrator and graphic artist

- Born: 1961 (age 64–65); Port-au-Prince, Haiti
- Education: Fashion Institute of Technology, New York City
- Known for: Painter, Illustrator, Graphic Designer

Marie-Denise Douyon (born 1961 in Port-au-Prince, Haiti) is a Canadian painter, illustrator and graphic artist. Her work has been exhibited in museums and galleries in Canada, the U.S., Europe and Africa.

== Life ==
Douyon was born in Haiti in 1961. She fled the Duvalier regime with her parents in 1964, and eventually settled in Morocco in 1966. She completed a visual arts degree at the Fashion Institute of Technology of New York in Manhattan, New York City. After Jean-Claude Duvalier fell from power in 1986, Douyon returned to Haiti. In the early 1990s, she was arrested, tortured and imprisoned by Haiti's military junta, but was released on February 7, 1991 as part of a general amnesty of Haitian political prisoners. Since 1991, Douyon has lived and worked in Montreal, Quebec.

== Career ==
Douyon's work has been exhibited in museums and galleries in Canada, France, the United States and in the Caribbean. In 2004, her work was shown at the UNESCO headquarters in Paris during a bicentennial celebration of Haitian independence.

Douyon integrates found and discarded objects into her art to "reinforce a social collective consciousness" regarding global warming and consumer culture. Her work also references her multicultural identity and African heritage.

== Solo exhibitions ==
- Verdun Cultural Center L'Art à Palabres, (Montreal, 2005)
- Galerie "Aux Trois Mailletz", L'Art à palâbres (Paris, 2003)
- Galerie "Aux Trois Mailletz", L'Art à palâbres (Paris, 2002)
- Maison de la culture Rivière-des-prairies (Montreal, 2002)
- Festival International de la poésie Galerie Nationale de Dakar (Dakar, 2000)
- Château Morange (Saint-Denis, Réunion, 2000)
- Festival d'été de Vancouver (Vancouver, 1998)
- Galerie d'art d'Outremont (Montreal, 1998)
- Galerie Céline Allard (Toronto, 1996)

== Group exhibitions ==
- Black National Fine Art Show, Gallery Bourbon-Lally (Pétion-Ville, Haiti, 2005)
- Inter American Development Bank (Washington, DC, 2004)
- L'Art à Palabres, UNESCO Head Office (Paris, 2004)
- Musée du Panthéon National Haïtien (Port-au-Prince, 1999)
