= Holly Coulis =

Canadian painter (born 1968)

Holly Coulis (born 1969) is a Canadian painter from Toronto, the co-founder of "Gallery 106 Green" based in Athens, Georgia, United States and Brooklyn, New York, United States.

== Education ==
Holly Coulis earned a Bachelor of Fine Arts degree from the Ontario College of Art and Design, Toronto, Ontario, and a Master of Fine Arts degree from the School of the Museum of Fine Arts, Boston, Massachusetts.

== Selected exhibition ==
- Eyes and Yous (2022), Klaus von Nichtssagend, New York, NY
- Orbit (2021), Philip Martin Gallery, Los Angeles, California
- Holly Coulis (2019), Klaus von Nichtssagend, New York, NY
- Dishes and Fruits (2019), Atlanta Contemporary, Atlanta, GA
- Holly Coulis (2015), Cherry and Martin, Los Angeles, California
