= Iris Hauser =

Canadian artist and painter (born 1956)

- Born: 1956 (age 69–70); Cranbrook, British Columbia
- Education: Nova Scotia College of Art and Design, University of Saskatchewan
- Known for: painter
- Website: Official website

Iris Hauser (born 1956) is a Canadian artist and painter. She is best known for her use of narrative and symbolism within portrait paintings and works primarily with oil paints. She currently resides in Saskatoon, Saskatchewan.

== Early life and education ==
Hauser was born in 1956 in Cranbrook, British Columbia. She studied in Victoria in from 1973 to 1974 before attending the Nova Scotia College of Art and Design in Halifax where she graduating in 1975. She continued her studies in the department of Art and Art History at the University of Saskatchewan from 1977 to 1979. Hauser then spent a year studying independently in Kassel Germany from 1980 to 1981.

== Career ==
Hauser has taught art at the Mendel Art Gallery in Saskatoon and at the University of Saskatchewan's Certificate of Art and Design program. She has served on the board of CARFAC (Canadian Artists Representation/Front des Artistes Canadiens) Saskatchewan and served as a juror for the Organization of Saskatchewan Arts Councils. Hauser's work is held in several collections including at the Mendel Art Gallery, Kenderdine Art Gallery, Saskatchewan Arts Board, the Canada Council Art Bank in Ottawa, and the Stall Gallery in Saskatoon, The Mann Gallery in Prince Albert and The Art Gallery of Regina as well as on many Canadian book covers.

== Work ==
Hauser showed an early interest in fine art, often mentioning an especially vivid dream she had as a toddler and her immediate attempt to recreate it in crayon. She incorporates symbolic and iconic imagery. She works primarily with oil paint.

Hauser often reuses her models for multiple works. One of her series Dancing with Hell Hounds compassionately depicts her bi-polar brother as various characters on his journey of healing.

=== Exhibitions ===
- Crone Ascendant, July 26 - September 27, 2024, Weyburn Art Gallery, Weyburn, SK
- Iris Hauser: Grounded in the Body, September 17 - October 8, 2022, Art Placement, Saskatoon, SK
- Duet: A Partnership in Life and Work, September 3-November 12, 2022, Saskatoon Craft Council, Saskatoon, SK
- Small Quirks, May 28, 2022 - August 27, Saskatchewan Craft Council, Saskatoon, SK
- Figureground, June–August 2018, group exhibition, The Gallery/Art Placement Inc., Saskatoon, SK
- Narratives, Spring 2018, Collaborative Exhibition with Cate Francis, The Mann Gallery, Prince Albert, SK
- Exhibition, December 2017-February 2018, Godfry Dean Art Gallery, Yorkton, SK
- Exhibition, November 2015-January 2016, The Mann Gallery, Prince Albert, SK
- Dress Codes, September–October 2015, The Art Gallery of Regina, Regina, SK
- The Evolution of the Imagination, August 2013, Station Art Center, Rosthern, SK.
- Altered States, June–September 2013, Mendel Art Gallery, Saskatoon, SK
- Only Human, 2010–2011, Estevan Art Gallery, Estevan, SK, and The Chapel Gallery, North Battleford, SK
- The Stall Gallery Presents Iris Hauser, 2010, The Stall Gallery, Saskatoon, SK
- A Delicate Balance, 2010, Collaborative exhibition with Ruth Sulatisky, Mendel Art Gallery, Saskatoon, SK
