= Marion Wagschal =

Canadian painter (born 1943)

- Born: 1943 (age 82–83); Port of Spain, Trinidad and Tobago
- Education: McGill University; Concordia University

Marion Wagschal RCA (born 1943) is a feminist Canadian painter known for figurative work which sometimes refers to the Holocaust and to her personal history.

== Career ==
She was born in Port of Spain, Trinidad and Tobago in 1943; her German parents emigrated there from Cologne, Germany in 1939. In 1951, Wagschal emigrated to Canada with her family and settled in Montreal. In 1962, she received a Teaching Diploma from MacDonald College, McGill University, and in 1975, a Bachelor of Fine Arts from Sir George Williams University (later Concordia University), Montreal. She taught painting and drawing at Concordia University for 37 years, and developed an innovative seminar/workshop entitled Women and Painting.

Her images are said to "bleed nostalgia and emotion" and concern the ravages of time on human flesh. A travelling retrospective titled Marion Wagschal: Portraits, Memories Fables was organized by Sarah Fillmore for the Art Gallery of Nova Scotia in 2014 and was shown at the Montreal Museum of Fine Arts in 2015. In 2017, the Musée d'art de Joliette held an exhibition of her work. In 2026, the National Gallery of Canada held a major show of her work over five decades titled Marion Wagshal: Cyclops and Other Tales.

Among the public galleries which have her paintings in their collection are the Musée national des beaux-arts du Québec, the Montreal Museum of Fine Arts, the Musée d'art contemporain de Montréal, Confederation Centre of the Arts (Charlottetown, Prince Edward Island), the Robert McLaughlin Gallery (Oshawa, Ontario) and Plattsburgh State Art Museum (Plattsburgh, New York).
