= Eric Pehap =

Estonian-Canadian artist (1912–1981)

- Born: 10 April 1912; Viljandi, Estonia
- Died: 22 November 1981 (aged 69); Toronto, Ontario, Canada

Eric Pehap (10 April 1912 – 22 November 1981), also known as Erich Konstantin or simply Pehap, was an abstract artist working in Canada.

== Biography ==
Eric Pehap was born in Viljandi in 1912 where his father worked as a police officer. Growing up in Viljandi, he studied art with Julius Mageri. He studied ceramics and graphics at the State School of Arts and Crafts in Tallinn, Estonia from 1931 to 1933 and at the "Pallas" College of Fine Arts in Tartu, where he received degrees in Painting and Graphic Arts. He worked in Estonia as a freelance artist and a drawing teacher, but in 1943, in the midst of the turmoil of war, he was forced into exile, moving around Northern Europe, first to Finland in 1943 and 1944 and then eventually to Sweden where he worked until 1949 as a commercial artist, designer and illustrator in Stockholm. In 1949 he relocated to Canada, where he continued his artistic profession and also became an art teacher and lecturer. He also contributed to periodicals and newspapers as an arts critic.

== Style ==
A versatile and prolific artist, Pehap was a world-famous print-maker and painter who produced thousands of prints using the New Direct Method and painted hundreds of oil paintings and watercolors. Most of his paintings are abstract and symbolic in nature. City views and figural compositions are two themes prevalent in his work. Moving figures, mainly female, indoors or outdoors, are modeled in different color combinations with varying degrees of sensitivity. Pehap's works take advantage of all modern-day light sources, illuminating, blending and reflecting. Pehap, who travelled widely and was able to observe Estonian cultural activity in many countries, noted in 1969 that "the group of artists in Toronto is unique and certainly the most active and strongest in the whole world outside our homeland." He was instrumental in forming the League of Estonian Artists in Toronto and served as its president from 1961 to 1968.

Pehap had over 15 one-man shows in Estonia, Sweden, New Zealand, Canada and participated in group exhibitions worldwide. He was the recipient of numerous arts prizes, including the Cultural Medal for Graphic Art, presented in Lyon, France, in 1979 and was awarded a Gold medal Italy at the Academy of Fine Arts of Parma in the same year.
