= List of people from Yukon =

Territorial flag of Yukon

This is a list of notable people who are from Yukon, Canada, or have spent a large part or formative part of their career in that territory.

== A ==
- Jerry Alfred — musician

== B ==
- Larry Bagnell — member of the House of Commons
- Bryon Baltimore — ice hockey player
- Kim Barlow — musician
- Doug Bell — former commissioner of Yukon
- Pierre Berton — writer
- George Black — former commissioner of Yukon and former Speaker of the House of Commons
- Martha Black — former member of the House of Commons
- Charlotte Selina Bompas — missionary
- William Carpenter Bompas — bishop
- Bev Buckway — curler and politician

== C ==
- Jack Cable — former commissioner of Yukon
- George Carmack — Klondike gold co-discoverer
- Kate Carmack — Klondike gold co-discoverer
- Dawson Charlie — Klondike gold co-discoverer
- Ione Christensen — former senator and former commissioner of the Yukon
- Dylan Cozens - professional ice hockey player for the Buffalo Sabres of the NHL

== D ==
- Pat Duncan — former premier

== E ==
- John Edzerza — politician

== F ==
- Dennis Fentie — Premier

== G ==
- Judy Gingell— former commissioner of the Yukon

== H ==
- Louise Hardy — former member of the House of Commons
- Todd Hardy — Yukon New Democratic Party leader and former Yukon Leader of the Opposition
- Ted Harrison — artist

== J ==
- Victor Jory — actor

== L ==
- Joseph Ladue — founder of Dawson City
- Daniel Lang — Senator

== M ==
- Skookum Jim Mason — Klondike gold co-discoverer
- Piers McDonald — former premier
- John Kenneth McKinnon — former commissioner of the Yukon
- Audrey McLaughlin — former member of the House of Commons and former leader of the New Democratic Party
- Arthur Mitchell — Yukon Leader of the Opposition

== N ==
- Erik Nielsen — former member of the House of Commons and Deputy Prime Minister of Canada

== O ==
- William Ogilvie — surveyor
- John Ostashek — former premier

== P ==
- Chris Pearson — former Government Leader
- Edward Peghin — Emmy-nominated Producer/Director
- Tahmoh Penikett — actor
- Tony Penikett — former Government Leader/Premier
- Willard Phelps — former Government Leader

== R ==
- Jim Robb (painter) — watercolour artist, photographer and author

== S ==
- Sahneuti — Gwichʼin First Nation leader
- Robert W. Service — poet
- Sam Steele — Mountie
- Peter Sturgeon — ice hockey player

== V ==
- Geraldine Van Bibber — former commissioner of the Yukon

== W ==
- James Morrow Walsh — former commissioner of the Yukon
- Shane Wilson — antler, horn, ivory and bronze sculptor
- Greg Wiltjer — basketball player

== See also ==
- List of writers from the Canadian territories
