= Lorna Brown (artist) =

Canadian artist, curator and writer

- Born: 1958 (age 67–68); Oxbow, Saskatchewan, Canada
- Known for: Artist, writer, and curator
- Website: https://lornabrown.ca

Lorna Brown (born 1958) is a Canadian artist, curator and writer. Her work focuses on public space, social phenomena such as boredom, and institutional structures and systems.

== Background ==
Lorna Brown was born in Oxbow, Saskatchewan, Canada. She started exhibiting her work in 1984. Brown taught studio and critical studies which includes art, design and media history, humanities, and social science courses at Emily Carr Institute of Art and Design and Simon Fraser University's School for Contemporary Arts from 1989–1999. From 1999–2004, Brown was the director and curator of Artspeak, one of many Canadian artist-run centres in Vancouver, British Columbia, and is currently the Associate Director/Curator at the Morris and Helen Belkin Art Gallery at the University of British Columbia.

== Exhibitions ==
- Carets, strike-outs, underlines, circles and dots, 2014, Publication Studio, Vancouver, British Columbia.
- As One Does, Beside Yourself, 2014, AHVA Gallery, University of British Columbia, Vancouver, British Columbia
- Threshold/Cont., 2009, Morris and Helen Belkin Gallery at the University of British Columbia.
- The Structure of Boredom (after Oden), The Chatter of Culture, 2007, Artspeak, Vancouver, British Columbia
- Cleave, 1999, Dazibao, Montreal, Quebec
- Once Removed, 1992, Contemporary Art Gallery, Vancouver, British Columbia
- Reading, 1990, Artspeak, Vancouver, British Columbia; Photographer's Gallery, Saskatoon, Saskatchewan; Belkin Satellite, Vancouver, British Columbia
- Measure, 1990, Evoking Place, Photographer's Gallery, Saskatoon Saskatchewan; Musée d'art contemporain de Montréal, Montreal, Quebec; Canadian Museum of Contemporary Photography, Ottawa, Ontario; McMaster Museum of Art, Hamilton, Ontario

== Curatorial ==
Lorna Brown has been an independent curator since 2004. Digital Natives a public art project with Other Sights for Artists' Projects, a non-profit arts organization in Vancouver, British Columbia, was commissioned by the City of Vancouver for the city's 125th anniversary. Digital Natives utilized an electronic billboard, located on Skwxwú7mesh territory and visible from Burrard Bridge, to share a curated series of Twitter messages in English and Skwxwú7mesh. Brown curated Beginning with the Seventies, a research project that investigated feminism, art, and activism in Vancouver in the 1970s and beyond. Beginning with the Seventies culminated in several exhibitions at the Morris and Helen Belkin Art Gallery, such as GLUT in 2018. GLUT featured women artists and writers such as Alexandra Bischoff, Lisa Robertson, Gathie Falk, Laiwan, Divya Mehra, Evelyn Roth, Elizabeth Zvonar, and Judith Copithorne among many more.

== Writing ==
Lorna Brown contributes essays, reviews, and interviews to publications such as Fillip and The Capilano Review.

Her writing also appears in exhibition catalogues, journals and books. Select examples include:

- Beginning with the Seventies, Morris and Helen Belkin Art Gallery, Vancouver, British Columbia, 2019.
- Supplement: Critical and Bibliographic Review. Montreal Artexte Editions, Montreal, Quebec, 2009.
- Ethics of Luxury: Materialism and Imagination, Jeanne Randolph, Ihor Holubizky and Anthony Kiendl, YYZ Books, Toronto, Ontario; PlugIn Editions, Winnipeg, Manitoba, 2007.
- Detained by the Camera, Catalogue Essay: "Don Gill's D'Arcy Island", Southern Alberta Art Gallery, Lethbridge, Alberta
- Directional Language, Off Printing: Situating Publishing Practices in Artist Run Centres, Conference Proceedings, RCAAQ, Quebec, 2005.
- Public Ideals, Prefix Photo 9, May 2004.
- Unfinished Business, The Rain Review of Books, Issue 4:2, Summer Autumn 2006, Vancouver.

== Projects ==
- Ruins in Process: Vancouver Art in the Sixties

== Collections ==
- National Gallery of Canada, Ottawa, Ontario
- Surrey Art Gallery (Searchable through artefacts Canada national database)
- Canada Council for the Arts - Art Bank (searchable through the Art Bank database)
- British Columbia Arts Council (collection not searchable online)

== Awards and honours ==
- Canada Council for the Arts Paris Studio Award, 2000 (searchable in their database).
- Recipient of the Vancouver Institute for the Visual Arts, 1996.
