= Jeneen Frei Njootli =

First Nations interdisciplinary artist

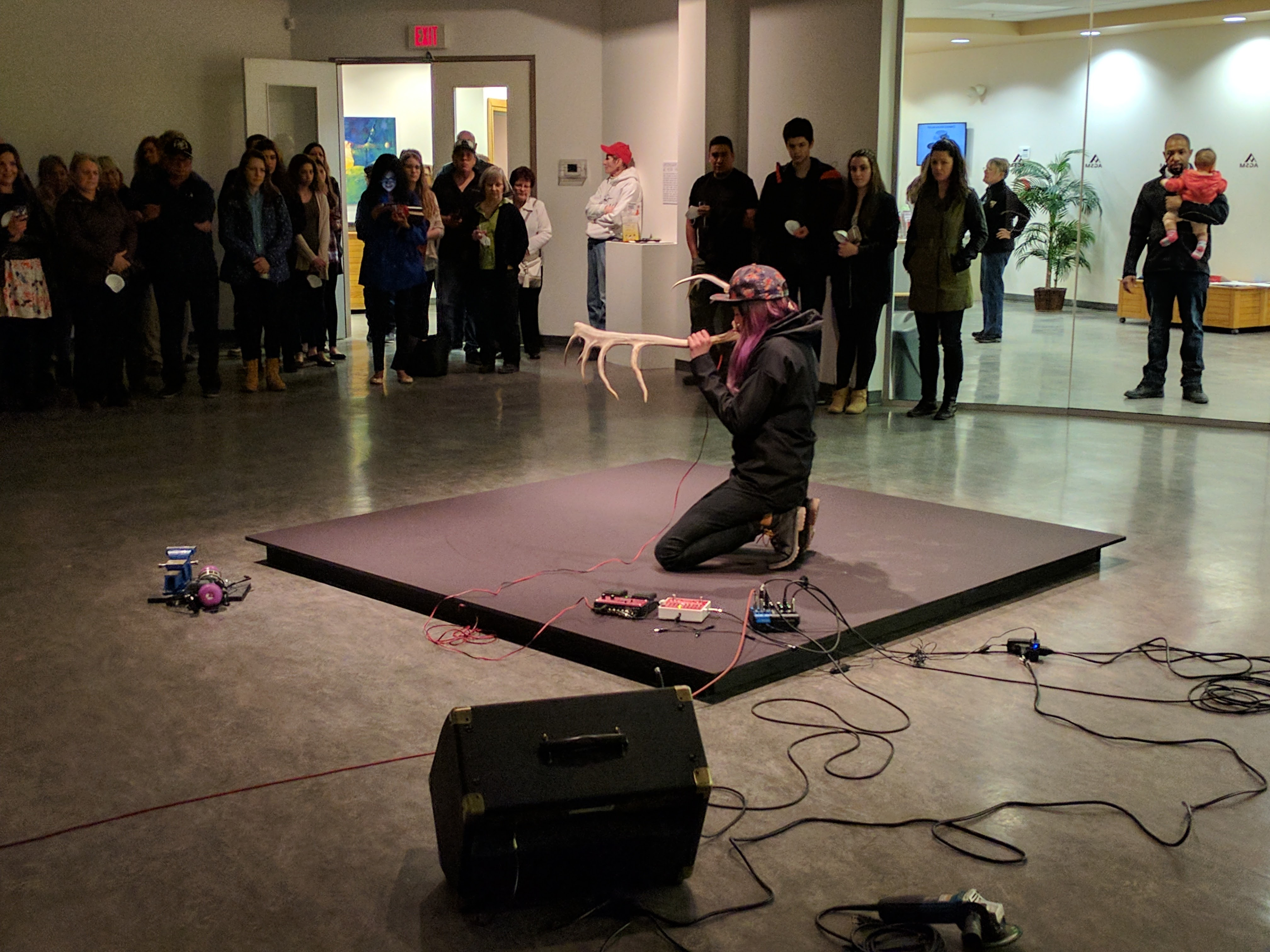
- Born: 1988 (age 37–38); Whitehorse, Yukon
- Education: University of British Columbia, Emily Carr University
- Movement: Interdisciplinary

Jeneen Frei Njootli (born 1988) is an interdisciplinary Vuntut Gwitchin artist known primarily for their work with sound and textiles, performance, fashion, workshops, and barbeques. Njootli identifies as nonbinary and uses they/them pronouns.

== Work ==
Njootli is a co-creator of the ReMatriate Collective, a group working toward better representation of Indigenous women in the media.

As one of the five finalist of the 2018 Sobey Art Award, Njoottli's work, wind sucked in through bared teeth (2017) is included in an eponymous exhibition featuring the finalists at the National Gallery of Canada.

In 2016, Njootli completed the Media Arts Residency at the Western Front, an artist-run centre in Vancouver.

Njootli has worked on several projects and presentations with artist Olivia Whetung. Whetung wrote Fugitive Dust to accompany Njootli's solo exhibition I Can’t Make You Those Mitts Because There Is a Hole in My Heart and My Hands Hurt (2018).

== Education ==
In 2012, Njootli graduated with a B.F.A. from Emily Carr University of Art and Design and in 2017, earned an M.F.A from the University of British Columbia. In 2016, Njootli completed the Earth Line Indigenous Tattoo training residency.

== Performance ==
2018

- Sound tools, Mercer Union, Toronto ON

2016

- Ishi: The Archive Performance with James Luna, la Jolla Playhouse, San Diego CA
- The language your tongue might find could be haunting, Sled Island Music Festival, Calgary AB
- Melanocite, aceart, Winnipeg MB

2015

- La Pocha Nostra, Live Biennale with La Pocha Nostra at VIVO, Vancouver BC
- Native Stories: Sounds, Stories & Shadows with James Luna, Live Biennale at VIVO, Vancouver BC
- She Showed Me What I Had Done, or What I Had Been Doing, Macaulay Co. & Fine Art, Vancouver BC
- Artist Talk and Performance at Audain Gallery, Super Cool Tuesdays, Vancouver BC

2014

- Performer: Claiming Space Exhibition Opening, Museum of Anthropology, Vancouver BC

== Awards and honours ==
Njootli was a finalist for the 2025 Yukon Prize for Visual Arts. In 2018, she was the Sobey Art Award Finalist for the West Coast and Yukon categories. In 2017, Njootli was also longlisted for the Sobey Art Award for the West Coast and Yukon categories, and in the same year, awarded the Contemporary Art Society of Vancouver's Artist Prize. In 2016, Njootli was awarded the Hnatyshyn Foundation, William & Meredith Saunderson Prize for Emerging Canadian Artist Lectures, Workshops & Curating.

== See also ==
- Jim Robb (painter)
- Joseph Tisiga
- Ted Harrison
