= Hugh Bompas =

English cricketer, barrister, military aviator and civil servant

Personal information
- Full name: Hugh Steele Bompas
- Born: 9 December 1881; Hampstead, Middlesex, England
- Died: 19 July 1944 (aged 62); Chelsea, London, England
- Batting: Right-handed
- Role: Wicket-keeper

Domestic team information
- Years: Team
- 1901–1903: Cambridge University

Career statistics
Competition	First-class
Matches	7
Runs scored	35
Batting average	3.88
100s/50s	–/–
Top score	15
Catches/stumpings	5/4
- Source: Cricinfo, 11 September 2020

Hugh Steele Bompas (19 December 1881 – 19 July 1944) was an English first-class cricketer, barrister, First World War aviator and civil servant.

The son of Henry Mason Bompas, a County Court judge, he was born at Hampstead in December 1881. He was educated at Westminster School, before going up to Pembroke College, Cambridge. While studying at Cambridge, Bompas played first-class cricket. He made his first-class debut for the personal XI of A. J. Webbe against Cambridge University in 1901. In that same season he played for Cambridge University against the touring South Africans, in addition to playing twice for London County against the Marylebone Cricket Club and Derbyshire. Having not played first-class cricket in 1902, he played three times for Cambridge University in 1903. Despite scoring 109 and 59 in his freshman match of 1901, Bompas was unable to carry that form into first-class cricket and scored just 35 runs from 11 batting innings', though as a wicket-keeper he did take 5 catches and make 4 stumpings.

A student of the Inner Temple, he was called to the bar to practice as a barrister in 1904. After practicing on the South Eastern Circuit, Bompas enlisted during the First World War in the Royal Naval Air Service (RNAS) as a flight sub-lieutenant in May 1915. He was promoted to flight lieutenant in June 1916, with the RNAS merging with the Royal Flying Corps to form the Royal Air Force in April 1918. In September 1918, Bompas held the rank of captain which he held until the end of the war and the relinquishment of his commission in April 1919. Following the war, he chose not to return to practice as a barrister and instead became a civil servant with the Ministry of Labour from 1919 to 1925 and the Secretary for Education to the Dental Board from 1925. He died at Chelsea in July 1944.

He was nephew of George C. Bompas and William Bompas.
