= Melanie O'Brian =

Canadian curator (born 1973)

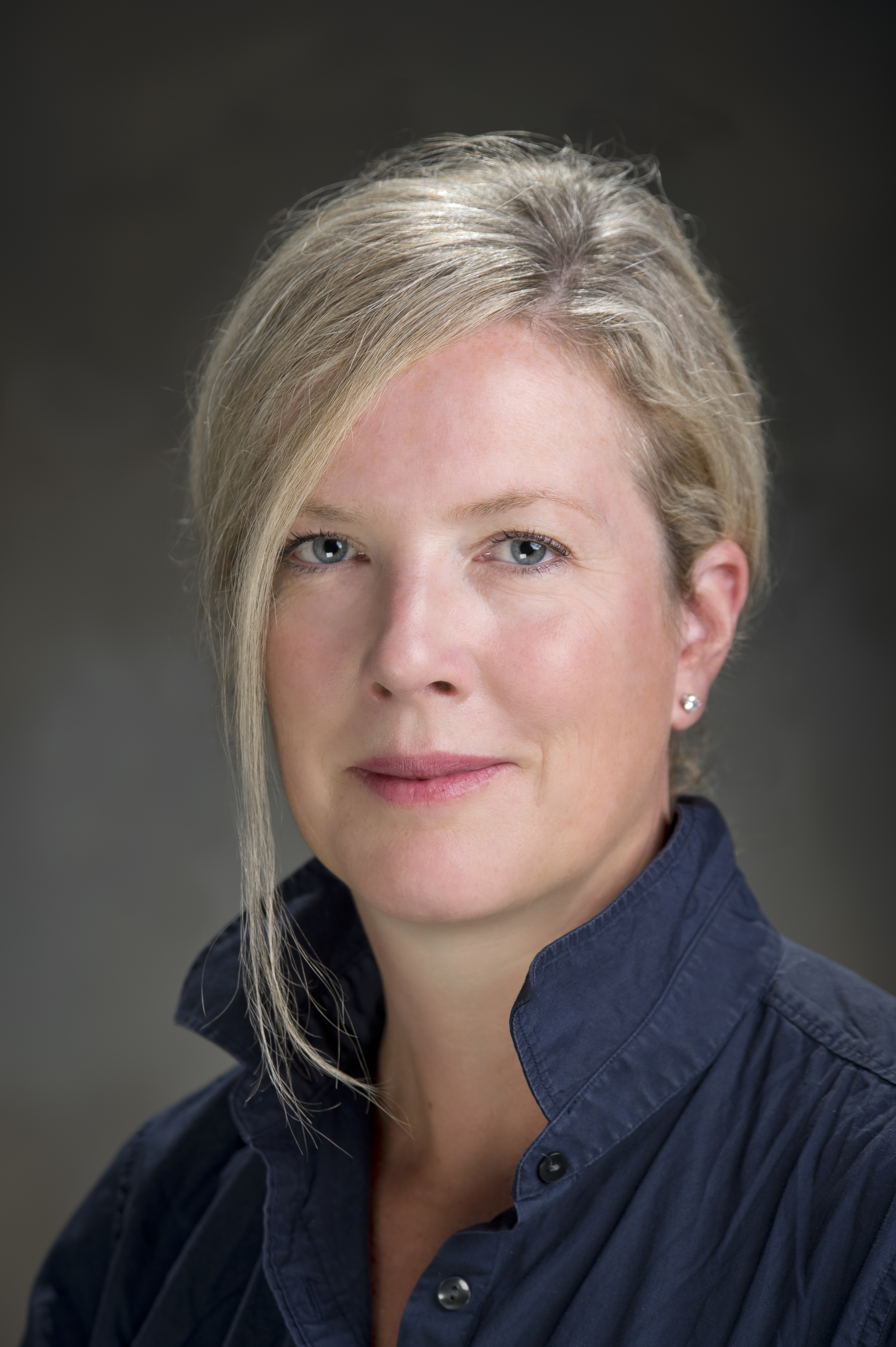
- Born: 1973; Toronto, Ontario
- Education: BA in Art History from Reed College, Portland, Oregon; MA in Art History at the University of Chicago, Chicago IL
- Known for: curator of contemporary art

Melanie O'Brian (born 1973) is a Canadian curator of contemporary art and writer based in Vancouver, British Columbia.

== Education ==
O'Brian received her BA in Art History from Reed College, Portland, Oregon, and her MA in Art History at the University of Chicago, Chicago IL.

== Career ==
She was Assistant Curator at the Vancouver Art Gallery 2001-2004, Director/Curator at Artspeak 2004-2010, the Curator/Head of Programs at The Power Plant in Toronto 2011-2012, Director/Curator of Simon Fraser University Galleries 2012-2020, and Associate Director/Curator and Acting Director/Curator and at the Morris and Helen Belkin Art Gallery from 2022-2025.

At The Power Plant, she curated solo exhibitions of work by Kerry Tribe, Stan Douglas, Omer Fast, and Simon Fujiwara, and group exhibitions that included the work of Abbas Akhavan, Karen Cytter, Geoffrey Farmer, Claire Fontaine, Jos de Gruyter and Harald Thys, Oscar Tuazon, Ulla von Brandenburg, and Franz West, among others.

At SFU Galleries, she curated solo exhibitions of work by Hito Steyerl, Walid Raad, Raymond Boisjoly, Marianne Nicolson, Andreas Bunte and Richard Ibghy and Marilou Lemmens, as well as co-curated group exhibitions such as Maps and Dreams with Brian Jungen, This Now, More Than Ever with Steve Collis, and Geometry of Knowing and Through a Window: Visual Art and SFU 1965-2015 with Amy Kazymerchyk.

In 2022, she was appointed the associate director and curator of the Morris and Helen Belkin Art Gallery at UBC. She will also serve as acting director for 2022 as Belkin continues to search for a permanent replacement for Scott Watson, who retired in 2021. In 2022, she also was one of the writers contributing to Althea Thauberger's publication, The State of the Situation.

She is the editor of such publications as Vancouver Art & Economies (Arsenal Pulp Press/Artspeak, 2007); Judgment and Contemporary Art Criticism with Jeff Khonsary (Fillip/Artspeak, 2010); Entertainment (The Power Plant, 2011); (with Milena Hoegberg) of 5,000 Feet is the Best: Omer Fast (The Power Plant/Henie Onstad Center/Sternberg Press, 2012); $5 Handshake: Art on Treaty 8 and with Stan Douglas, of Territory (SFU Galleries, 2018).

She was a contributing curator to MashUp: The Birth of Modern Culture at the Vancouver Art Gallery. She has taught at Emily Carr University, Simon Fraser University, and the University of British Columbia.
