= Siku Allooloo =

Writer and educator (born 1986)

- Born: 1986 (age 39–40); Yellowknife, Northwest Territories, Canada
- Website: www.sikuallooloo.com

Siku Allooloo (born 1986) is an Inuk/Haitian/Taíno writer, artist, facilitator, filmmaker, and land-based educator from Denendeh ("the Land of the People"), Northwest Territories, and Pond Inlet, Nunavut in Canada. Allooloo's works incorporates the legacies of resistance to settler colonialism and revitalization of Indigenous communities. Through her writing, visual art, and activism, Allooloo fights against colonial violence on Indigenous women. She has been widely recognized for her leadership in grassroots activism, particularly in advocating for land and water protection. She won Briarpatch magazine's 2016 creative nonfiction contest with the piece titled "Living Death".

== Educational background ==
Siku Allooloo holds a Bachelor of Arts degree (BA) in Anthropology and Indigenous studies from the University of Victoria. Her diverse background in cultural land-based programming, youth development, research, and solidarity serves as the foundation of her creativity.

== Activism ==
In 2013, Allooloo drafted principles for the Indigenous Nationhood movement. This website was a call for Aboriginal nations to move away from the Indian Act and towards autonomy from the Canadian government.

She also participated in integrating the Idle No More movement into the North.

In 2016, Allooloo assisted the international organization, Human Rights Watch's investigation about police abuse of Indigenous women in Saskatchewan.

In 2020, Allooloo participated in a demonstration of support for Wetʼsuwetʼen First Nation in Yukon. In late December 2019, a British Columbia judge signed off on an injunction that would prevent the Wet'suwet'en from protecting their land from the proposed Coastal GasLink Pipeline.

== Visual art ==
=== Themes ===
Siku Allooloo explores a wide range of themes throughout her work, with a strong focus on reclaiming and revitalizing Indigenous knowledge and traditions. She is particularly dedicated to addressing the 'patching' of ancestral gaps caused by colonialism, working to restore cultural continuity and strengthen Indigenous identity. Her work also emphasizes land-based education, teaching from a cultural perspective that reconnects Indigenous peoples with their ancestral lands, languages, and ways of knowing.

- Techniques

Allooloo has employed a diverse range of artistic techniques, including traditional and contemporary practices such as intricate traditional beadwork, evocative poetry, hand-carved stamping, and documentary filmmaking.

=== Akia (2019) ===
Akia is a poem written on Seal skin on canvas, the poem is based on an intimate family story, between her and her father and attempting to repair things that have been severed from colonialism, a major theme being the transformation of ones suffering in terms of a lack of or lost identity from colonization and imperialism.

=== Sapajuji (protector) (2021) ===
Sapajuji is a beaded chest pieces on a Amauti design, which is a traditional native garment. The Chest pieces is worn as a protective garment. The use of beading alludes to connection of ones culture as a means of protection, and self defense. This piece is supposed to represent the deflection of colonialism, violence and erasure.

=== Spirit Emulsion (2022) ===
Spirit emulsion is a short film telling the story of Taíno culture and reconnecting with ones identity. This short film is inspired by Allooloo's mother and speaks of Taíno teachings and practices persist despite colonial attempts at distortion and erasure.

=== Indígena (2025) ===
This is a short film that is still currently in production, and is set to be released later in 2025. This is short documentary style film that recalls Taíno history, alluding to her mother's activism.

== Career ==
Allooloo also has a career in journalism mirroring the career of her mother, where she advocates for Indigenous peoples. She specifically covers stories about Native women, and environmental activism.

Her writing has been featured in Briarpatch, The Malahat Review, Nuit Blanche Toronto, Canadian Art, The Guardian, Chatelaine and Surrey Art Gallery Presents, among other publications.

She was faculty for the residency "The Space Between Us: Technology, collaboration, and the future" held at the Banff Centre for Arts and Creativity. Allooloo was also the artistic producer for "Bystander: Study Guide" by the Gwaandak Theatre in 2018.

== Group exhibitions and projects ==
Allooloo has collaborated artistically with Indigenous artists across Canada since 2014.

Exhibitions and projects include:

- 2015: Allooloo participated in the Indigenous Writers Program at the Banff Centre, Alberta.
- 2017: Way in Which It Was Given to Us at Surrey Art Gallery, British Columbia. Allooloo's essay was presented accompanied with Marianne Nicolson's animation for the city's annual public art project, UrbanScreen.
- 2017: Life on Neebahgeezis; A Luminous Engagement, Many Possible Futures at Nuit Blanche in Toronto (2017), curated by Maria Hupfield. With an indigenous writer and academic, Jaskiran Dhillon, Allooloo conducted the commissioned project, In Conversation: Becoming an Accomplice.
- 2018: Mirrored in Stone, as a part a larger project called New Chapter program funded through Canada Council for the Arts. This project created a collaborative documentary film in collaboration with Vancouver-based artists, Marianne Nicolson and Althea Thauberger with five emerging artists including Allooloo.
- 2018: This world; here, Arts & Media Lab, the Isabel Bader Centre for Performing Arts, Queens University.
- 2019: Hexsa'am, Morris and Helen Belkin Art Gallery'. Her piece, "Akia" was displayed through sealskin on canvas.

== Publications ==
Allooloo's creative non-fiction and poetry pieces appear in several journals, magazines, news articles, and academic books.

- In 2015, she wrote an article for the Northern Journal titled "Reclaim justice, end the violence."
- In 2016, Allooloo wrote Dismantling Columbus and the Power of the Present for Truthout.
- In 2016, Allooloo's creative nonfiction piece "Living Death" won Briarpatch magazine's creative nonfiction contest.
- In 2016, Allooloo's creative nonfiction piece, "Caribou People" appeared in the magazine Indigenous Perspectives. This piece was later included in the book, Shapes of Native Nonfiction: Collected Essays by Contemporary Writers, published by Washington University Press in 2019. Though depicting the feast on caribou with Allooloo's own relatives, this piece describes the impact of climate change on Indigenous people living in the north.
- In 2017, four poems, individually titled: "Because, colonialism", "Survivor's Guilt guilt", "Stone whisperer", and "Offering", were featured in The New Quarterly.
- In 2019, the poem for "Akia" was published in Canadian Art. This piece was also displayed in 2019 exhibition "Hexsa'am: To Be Here Always." at Morris and Helen Belkin Art Gallery, through sealskin on canvas.

== Importance ==
While Siku is not the first to develop these art techniques or depicting ones culture. The importance of her artwork lies in her distinct and unique perspective she offers, as Allooloo stands as a voice for not only Inuit, but also Taíno. She represents both communities and makes art to depict not only their struggles but their recovery. Through her art, she combines both sides of her ancestry to amplify indigenous voices specifically relating to land rights.
