= Morris and Helen Belkin Art Gallery =

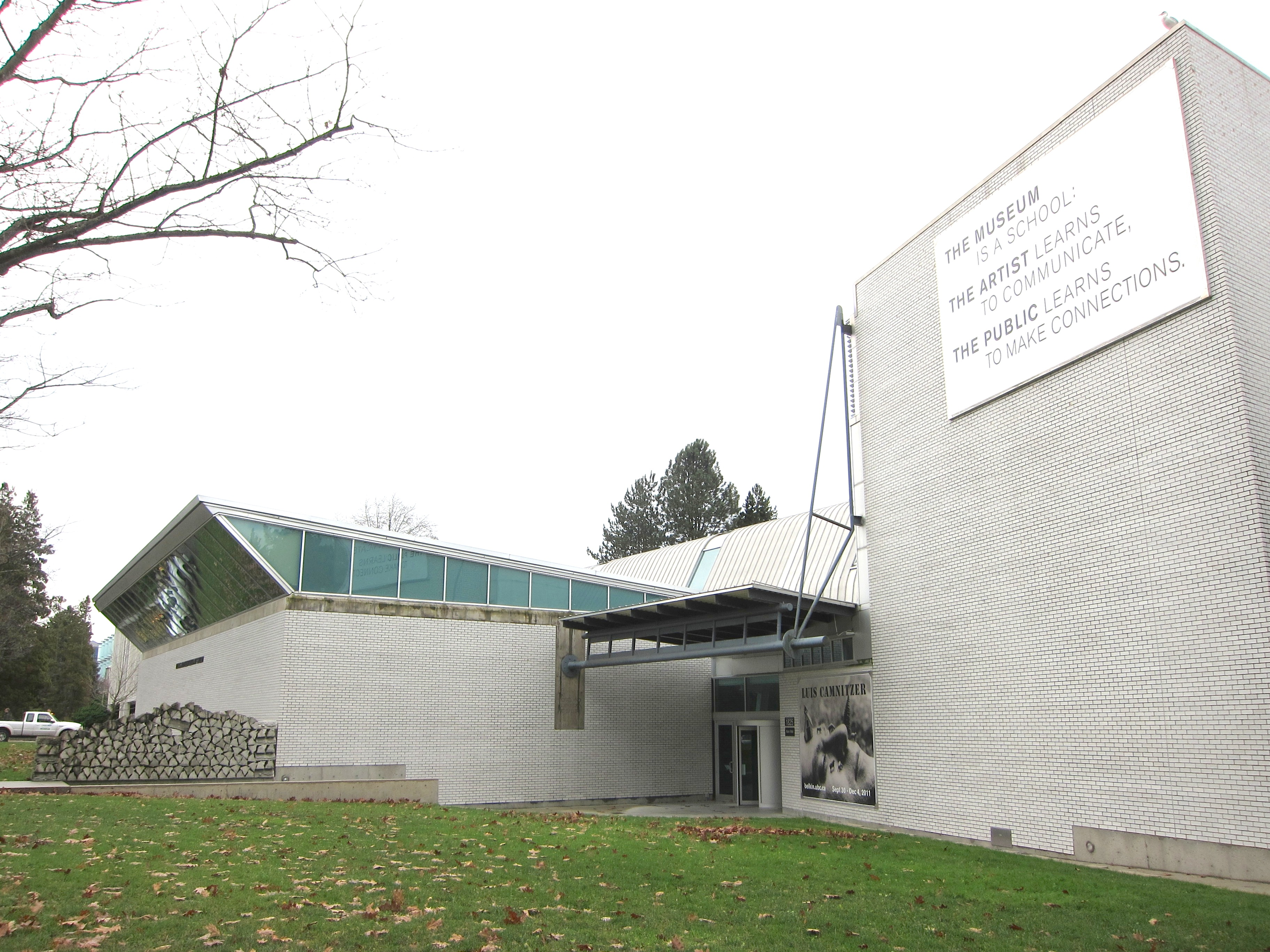
- Exterior of the Morris and Helen Belkin Art Gallery
- Former name: UBC Fine Arts Gallery
- Established: 1948; 78 years ago
- Location: 1825 Main Mall, Vancouver, BC V6T 1Z2
- Coordinates: 49.26816°N 123.25623°W
- Type: Art Gallery
- Director: Scott Watson (curator)
- Curator: Lorna Brown
- Architect: Peter Cardew
- Website: belkin.ubc.ca

The Morris and Helen Belkin Art Gallery is a contemporary art gallery in Vancouver, British Columbia, on the campus of the University of British Columbia. The gallery is housed in a building designed by architect Peter Cardew which opened in 1995. Cardew received a RAIC gold medal for the building's design in 2012. It houses UBC's growing collection of contemporary art as well as archives containing objects and records related to the history of art in Vancouver.

The Morris and Helen Belkin Art Gallery mounts 4 to 7 exhibitions of art per year by nationally and internationally known artists and works from the collection are showcased annually in a thematic exhibition. The Belkin Art Gallery also creates small scale traveling exhibitions for circulation within Canada and collaborates on large scale international exhibitions.

The permanent collection includes works of art, outdoor art, and an archives. An estimated 13 percent of the Gallery's collection is from women artists and an annual edit-a-thon was launched at the gallery to create articles on more of those women on Wikipedia in 2017.

== History ==
The UBC Fine Arts Gallery was founded in 1948 in a basement section of the Main Library on the university campus. At the time, the Fine Arts Gallery was the only venue in the Vancouver region that focused exclusively on contemporary art. The gallery rose in national status during the 1960s and 1970s by presenting innovative work by artists who were establishing Vancouver on the international art scene.

Until 1994, the gallery was used only as an exhibition space; afterwards, it began to house and administer the University Art Collection. On June 14, 1995, the Fine Arts Gallery was rededicated as the Morris and Helen Belkin Art Gallery and opened its new facility at 1825 Main Mall.

== Mandate ==
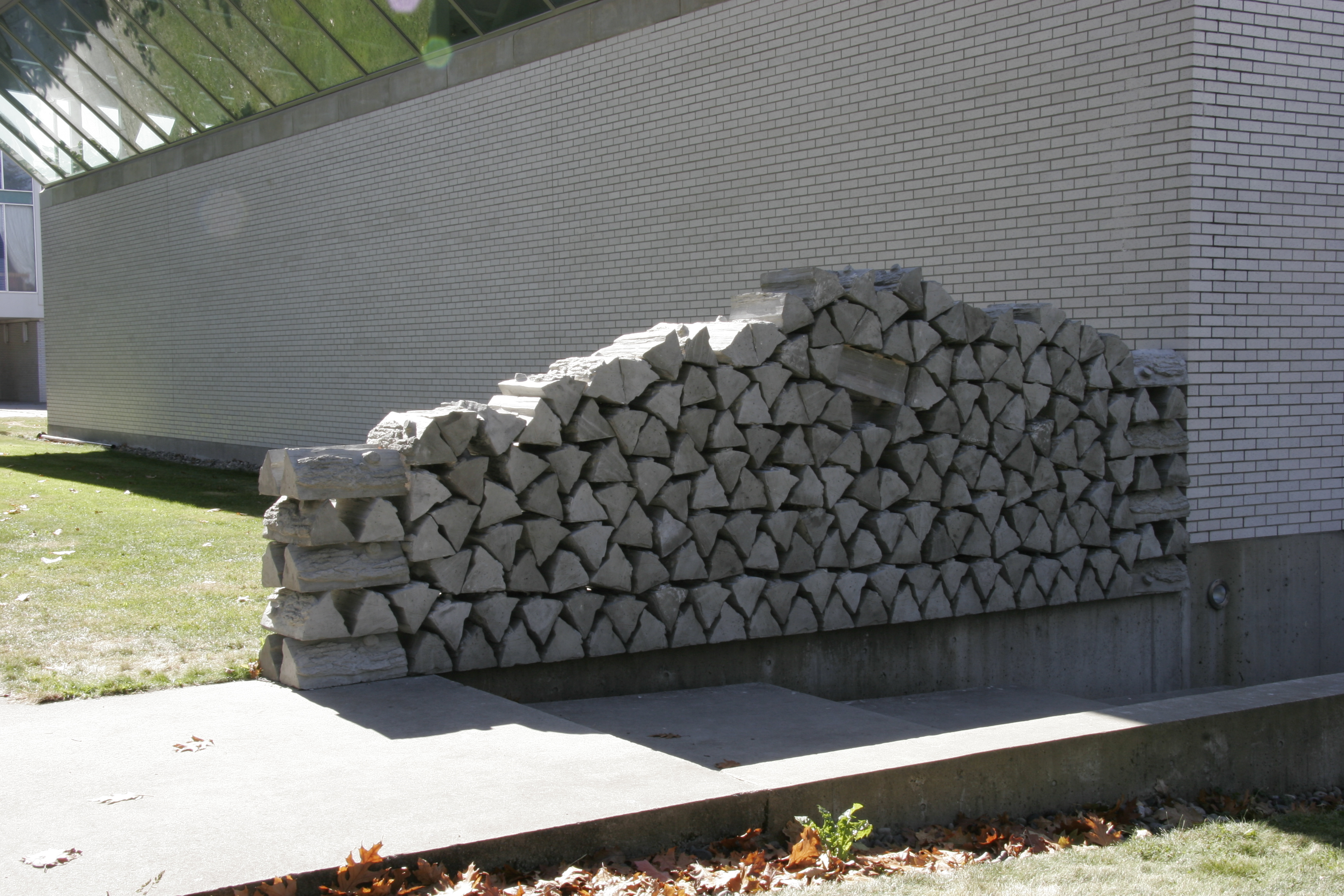
Wood for the People by Myfanwy MacLeod, 2002

The Morris and Helen Belkin Art Gallery at UBC is mandated to research, exhibit, collect, publish, educate and develop programs in the field of contemporary art and in contemporary approaches to the practice of art history and criticism. The Belkin maintains and manages the University's art collection of over 5,000 objects, including the Outdoor Art Collection, and an archives of over 30,000 items. Works from the permanent collection and archives, with an emphasis on recent acquisitions, are exhibited on an annual basis and are also used by other institutions for research and loans. The Belkin has an active publication program and participates in programming that includes lectures, tours, concerts and symposia related to art history, criticism and curating.

== Outdoor Art, Collections, and Archives ==
The Gallery is home to the artworks and archives of artists such as Roy Arden, Carol Conde, Roy Kiyooka, Rodney Graham, Judith Lodge, Al Neil, Skeena Reece, Karen Azoulay, Joyce Wieland, Rebecca Belmore, and Wayne Ngan. The largest fonds in the archives is the Morris/Trasov Archive (formerly known as Image Bank), which holds thousands of items related to artists Michael Morris and Vincent Trasov and an extensive network of mail artists

Since 2003, new outdoor works have been installed on campus by artists Rodney Graham, Jamelie Hassan, Myfanwy Macleod, and Edgar Heap of Birds. A self-guided tour of Outdoor Art on campus can be downloaded from the Morris and Helen Belkin Art Gallery website.

== Select exhibitions ==
Scott Watson, the gallery's Director/Curator from 1989 to 2021, encouraged partnerships both locally and internationally. For Utopian Territories: New Art from Cuba (1997), the Belkin partnered with seven other galleries to present the work of 23 contemporary Cuban artists to a Vancouver audience. For Théodore Géricault: The Alien Body/Tradition in Chaos (1997), the Belkin worked closely with the Louvre and the École nationale supérieure des Beaux-Arts in Paris to bring 80 works to the gallery. And for Ruins in Process: Vancouver Art in the Sixties (2009), the Belkin collaborated with grunt gallery to create an online digital archive of Vancouver art in the 1960s and early 1970s. Watson similarly invited curatorial collaborations, including the internationally recognized exhibition and publication projects Thrown: Influences and Intentions of West Coast Ceramics (2004), Rebecca Belmore: Fountain at the Venice Biennale (2005), Witnesses: Art and Canada's Indian Residential Schools (2013) and Image Bank (2019 at KW Institute for Contemporary Art, Berlin and 2021 at the Belkin), which consisted almost entirely of material pulled from the Belkin's Morris/Trasov Archive.

Keith Wallace, the Belkin's Associate Director/Curator from 2005 to 2007 and 2012 to 2015, extended the gallery's established focus on Cuban art with The Spaces Between: Contemporary Art from Havana (2014), co-curated with artist Tonel and including artists Juan Carlos Alom, Javier Castro, Sandra Ceballos Obaya, Celia-Yunior, Ricardo G. Elías, Luis Gárciga Romay, Luis Gómez Armenteros, Jesús Hdez-Güero, Ernesto Leal, Glenda León, Eduardo Ponjuán González, Grethell Rasúa, Lázaro Saavedra González and Jorge Wellesley.

Lorna Brown, the Belkin's Associate Director/Curator from 2015-2021, created a four-part series of exhibitions under the title of Beginning with the 70s (2017-2019), an ongoing research and archival project examining the generative potential of the era. The exhibitions include GLUT, Radial Change, Collective Acts, Hexsa'am: To Be Here Always which exhibited artists such as Christine D'Onofrio, Helen Goodwin, Marianne Nicolson, Althea Thauberger, Alexandra Bischoff, Gathie Faulk, Anne Ramsden, Elizabeth Zvonar, Kate Craig, Carole Itter, Dana Claxton, Jeneen Frei Njootli, Gutai, Laiwan, Siku Allooloo and the Salish Weavers Guild.

In September 2020, Belkin hosted Soundings: An Exhibition in Five Parts curated by Candice Hopkins and Dylan Robinson. This show also exhibited at The Gund Gallery at Kenyon College in Gambier, Ohio, Agnes Etherington Art Centre, Kingston, ON, the Kitchener-Waterloo Art Gallery, Kitchener-Waterloo, and Kamloops Art Gallery, Kamloops, Artists exhibited in Soundings included Raven Chacon, Sebastian De Line, Camille Georgeson-Usher, Maggie Groat, Kite, Germaine Koh, Cheryl L'Hirondelle, Tanya Lukin Linklater, Cristóbal Martínez, Peter Morin, Ogimaa Mikana, Diamond Point, Lisa C. Ravensbergen, Heidi Aklaseaq Senungetuk, Greg Staats, Olivia Whetung, Maggie Groat, and Tania Willard.

An annual exhibition is held every year for graduates of the Master of Fine Arts program at the University of British Columbia. Alumni include Aileen Bahmanipour and Marina Roy.
