= Grauerholz =

Grauerholz is a surname. Notable people with the surname include:

- Angela Grauerholz (born 1952), German-born Canadian photographer, graphic designer, and educator
- James Grauerholz (1953–2026), American writer and editor
