= Anne Ramsden =

Canadian artist (born 1952)

- Born: 1952 (age 73–74); Kingston, Ontario, Canada
- Education: Queen's University, Nova Scotia College of Art and Design, Concordia University

Anne Ramsden (born 1952) is a Canadian artist who has exhibited widely in Canada. She currently lives and works on Gabriola Island, British Columbia on the traditional and unceded territory of the Snuneymuxw First Nation.

== Life and education ==
Ramsden was born in Kingston, Ontario. She received a Bachelor of Arts from Queen's University in 1973, a Bachelor of Fine Arts from Nova Scotia College of Art and Design in 1977, and a Master of Fine Arts from Concordia University in 1983.

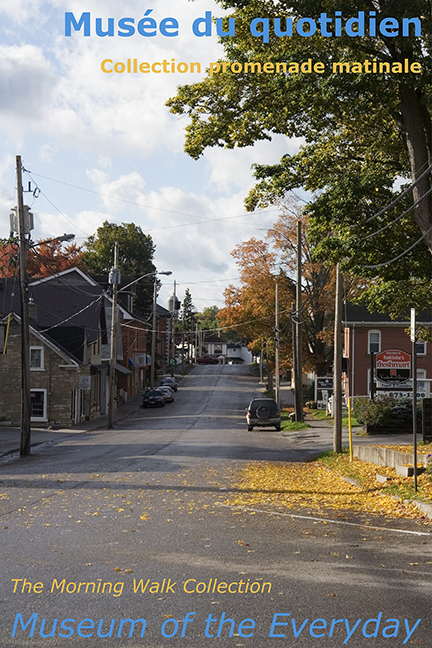
Anne Ramsden, "Museum of the Everyday, The Morning Walk Collection/Musée du quotidien, Collection promenade matinale," 2005-2014, inkjet print on polypropylene. Collection of the artist From the series of 65 photo-posters entitled Museum of the Everyday/Musée du quotidien, 2005-2014. To view the series go to https://www.flickr.com/photos/anneramsden

Ramsden was a co-founder, along with Francine Perinet and Angela Grauerholz, of the documentation centre and bookstore Artexte and served as co-director from 1980 to 1987.

She served as editorial editor for Parachute Magazine from 1980 to 1982. From 1987 to 1998, Ramsden taught at the School for Contemporary Art at Simon Fraser University. and from 1998 to 2017 was professor in the École des arts visuels et médiatiques at the Université du Quebec à Montréal.

== Artistic practice ==
Ramsden works across a variety of media, including sculpture, installation, photography, and video. Ramsden has exhibited widely across Canada. Several notable solo exhibitions include Anastylosis: Inventory, which was exhibited at the Centre Cultural de l'Université de Sherbrooke, Sherbrooke in 2000 and at the Southern Alberta Art Gallery in Lethbridge in 2002; Relations at Artspeak Gallery, Vancouver in 1988; and Urban Geography, shown at the UBC Fine Arts Gallery (now the Morris and Helen Belkin Art Gallery), Vancouver and the Mendel Art Gallery, Saskatoon in 1990.

Ramsden's work has investigated museology and museum display practices, mass media, and the social spaces and visual culture engendered by new technologies. Her multidisciplinary work has been described as bearing an 'obvious feminist thrust.'

=== Selected works ===
Ramsden's series, Relations (1988), consisted of eight photo-diptychs that consider the, "shifting perceptions of the museum itself." Reesa Greenberg writes that the, "doubling, repetition, juxtaposition, shifts in focus and the reflection of a female viewer positioned outside the museum identify the museum as colonist, racist and sexist."

Reclaimed for Mercouri (1987), created for Parachute Magazine, consisted of two photographs of the Elgin Marbles in the British Museum printed on the recto and verso of the same page. The project considers, "the temporal/spatial shift required to see and present art from more than one point of view by drawing a parallel between the physical act of moving through the gallery and the turning of a page."

Robin Laurence describes Ramsden's seven-monitory video installation, Urban Geography, as using, "a strategy of fragmentation and failed communication" in order to convey, "a condition of alienation."

== Awards ==
In 1993, Ramsden was awarded the Canada Council for the Arts Joseph S. Stauffer Award, which recognizes Canadian artists who exhibit strong artistic potential in music, visual arts, and literature.

== Collections ==
- Agnes Etherington Gallery, Kingston
- Akademie der Kunste, Berlin
- Burnaby Art Gallery, Burnaby
- Canada Council Art Bank, Ottawa
- Carleton University Art Gallery, Ottawa
- Centre Culturel Canadien, Paris
- Concordia University, Montreal
- Freedman Gallery, Reading
- Morris and Helen Belkin Art Gallery, Vancouver
- Musée d’art contemporain de Montréal
- Musée régionale de Rimouski
- National Gallery of Canada, Ottawa
- Oakville Galleries, Oakville
- Vancouver Art Gallery, Vancouver
