= Lorna Brown =

Lorna Brown may refer to:

- Lorna Brown (artist)
- Lorna Brown (actress)
