= John Hartman (artist) =

Canadian artist (born 1950)

- Born: April 13, 1950 (age 76); Midland, Ontario, Canada
- Education: B.A., McMaster University, Hamilton (1973), courses in fine art with George Wallace
- Website: http://www.johnhartman.ca

John Hartman CM RCA (born April 13, 1950) is a Canadian painter and printmaker based in Ontario.

== Career ==
John Hartman, born in Midland, Ontario, was raised on the southern and eastern shores of Georgian Bay. In the process of obtaining a degree at McMaster University in Hamilton which he finished in 1973, he took courses in fine art from instructor George Wallace who was enthusiastic about German Expressionism. He also was friendly with David Blackwood, then an art instructor, whom he had met when he attended Camp Hurontario, a boys’ camp. The poet Douglas LePan was also a friend and mentor.

== Work ==
Hartman has said that the artists who inspired him include figures from art history such as J. M. W. Turner, Albrecht Altdorfer, Chaïm Soutine, Oskar Kokoschka and in Canada, David Milne and the Group of Seven, among others. In his art, he has favored an aerial view of the land, even renting planes to see the impact humans have made on landscape – their histories and memories. He sees cities as living organisms, combined with their geography so his narrative is a complex mixture. In 2007, he said:

One of the things which astonished me was realizing the ways in which my Western civilization tended to regard itself as separate from the land, when it would have been much healthier to have conceived of the world as the Aboriginals do – as a huge and constantly changing organism and ourselves as part of it.

Hartman's work has been discussed by critics along with that of David T. Alexander and others. He has been called an artist who, in the "true tradition of Canadian painters, is not afraid of visiting the far-flung edges of this country, pursuing subjects, painting them in his edgy style".

His works are in the collections of many public galleries such as the McMichael Canadian Art Collection, Kleinburg; Museum London, Ontario; the Robert McLaughlin Gallery, Oshawa; the Winnipeg Art Gallery; and elsewhere.

== Selected exhibitions ==
Although Hartman has a lengthy exhibition history beginning with a solo exhibition at Trinity College, University of Toronto, in 1972, and with many shows nationally and internationally, largely in the 1980s, it took Painting the Bay: Recent Work by John Hartman at the McMichael Canadian Art Collection in 1993, large-scale paintings of Georgian Bay, aerial views of thickly-painted landscape, to bring him to critical attention. In the skies of this series, Hartman painted stories about the places he depicted to achieve his concept of the land as being more than mere landscape.

Hartman continued to receive national exposure with the exhibition and book Big North: The Paintings of John Hartman, a major exhibition of Hartman's works, organized by Museum London and the Tom Thomson Art Gallery which toured Canada between 1999 and 2002. In 2003, he began to paint aerial views of cities as living organisms. These paintings made up the exhibition and book Cities curated by Stuart Reid which toured Canada and internationally from 2007 to 2009. In 2014, the Woodstock Art Gallery organized John Hartman: Many Lives Mark This Place with a book by Ian M. Thom, an exhibition of a series of 30 portraits of Canadian authors and the places that were important to them. The show travelled to the McMichael Canadian Art Gallery and elsewhere.

== Honours and awards ==
He is a member of the Royal Canadian Academy. In 2020, he received the Order of Canada. The John Hartman Award from the MacLaren Art Centre in Barrie, Ontario was established in 2016. In 2018, Olivia Whetung received the award.

== Personal life ==
John Hartman's grandfather was the artist William J. Wood who lived in Midland. In 1973, while still a student at McMaster, Hartman organized a retrospective of Wood's etchings at the McMaster Museum of Art.

Hartman lives and has his studio in Lafontaine, Ontario.

== Record sale prices ==
At Waddington's Canadian Fine Art Auction, November 13–18, 2021, Hartman's Manitou Dock, 1993, a diptych, 182.9 x 304.8 cms, illustrated in John Hartman and Jean Blodgett, Painting the Bay: Recent Work by John Hartman (McMichael Canadian Art Collection: Kleinburg, Ontario, 1993) on page 25, estimated at $10,000–15,000, realized a price of $40,800.

== Bibliography ==
- "Big North: The Paintings of John Hartman". library.gallery.ca. Key Porter, 1999.
- Tovell, Rosemarie L. (2008). Invention & Revival: The Colour Drypoints of David Milne and John Hartman. Ottawa: Carlton University Art Gallery.
