= Chop Cut Rebuild =

- Also known as: CCR
- Genre: Documentary/Lifestyle
- Directed by: Edward Peghin, Chris Hall, Megan Waters
- Narrated by: Dan Woods
- Theme music composer: Edward Peghin
- Country of origin: United States
- Original language: English
- No. of seasons: 12
- No. of episodes: 191

Production
- Production location: Various
- Running time: 22'30"

Original release
- Network: Speed 2004–13; MAVTV 2014—
- Release: 7 February 2004 – February 2017

Chop Cut Rebuild is an automotive documentary-lifestyle series. The show is the creation of its host Canadian actor Dan Woods who was previously known for his role as Principal Daniel Raditch in the Degrassi teen drama franchise. The series is produced by Dan Woods and Edward Peghin and directed by Edward Peghin. In 2012, Dan Woods and Edward Peghin were nominated for a Daytime Emmy award for Outstanding Lifestyle Program.

== Broadcast history ==
The series was first shown on Speed Channel from 2004 through 2013. On March 5, 2013, Fox Sports announced that it would relaunch Speed Channel as Fox Sports 1 on August 17, 2013, with significant changes in programming but retaining NASCAR coverage. On June 21, 2013, Fox Sports 1 announced that a number of series that aired on Speed Channel would not be part of the new channel's line up, and this included Chop Cut Rebuild.

Starting April 8, 2014, Chop Cut Rebuild began appearing on MAVTV, and new episodes are broadcast through 2017.
