= Melanie Gilligan =

Canadian artist living in New York City (born 1979)

Melanie Gilligan (born 1979) is a Canadian artist living in New York City who works in video, performance, text, installation, and music.

Gilligan graduated from Fine Art at Central Saint Martins in 2002 and studied at the Whitney Museum of American Art’s Independent Study Program, 2004-2005.

== Projects ==
About Popular Unrest, a feature-length film released online and touring as an exhibition by Gilligan, the critic Aileen Burns says, "Like her TV counterparts, Gilligan uses professional actors and mixes taping strategies to yield documentary-styled fiction, and divides her gory, fast-paced narrative into a series of episodes that builds toward a surprise finish." Art critic Dan Fox said about Gilligan's 2008 production Crisis in the Credit System that "[the] film takes as its starting point a brainstorming workshop run by an investment bank. The characters are asked to take part in a role-playing game, which develops from the familiar (hedge-fund managers spinning profit from the misfortune of others) through to the surreal (a financial analyst is put under hypnosis in order to forecast stock market activity, and ends up delivering gnomic utterances on the state of the markets)."

Self-Capital, Gilligan's 2009 single screen film, was shot at the Institute for Contemporary Art in London, starring an actress playing four roles: therapist and patient, customer and cashier.

== Exhibitions ==
- "The Little Things Could Be Dearer", MoMA PS1, New York, USA (2014)
- "Everyone Is Unique – You Most Of All", Kunstverein Leipzig, Leipzig, Germany (2015)
- "British Art Show 8", Leeds Art Gallery, Leeds, UK (2015)
- Chisenhale Gallery, London, UK (2010)
- Kölnischer Kunstverein, Cologne, Germany (2010)
- "Crisis in the Credit System", Justina M. Barnicke Gallery, Toronto, Canada (2012)
- "Popular Unrest", VOX Centre de l’image contemporaine, Montreal, Canada (2012)
- "4 x exchange / abstraction", Galerie Max Mayer, Düsseldorf, Germany (2014)
- "The Common Sense", Casco, Utrecht, The Netherlands (2014); Museum De Hallen, Haarlem, The Netherlands (2014); de Appel arts centre, Amsterdam, the Netherlands (2015)
- Künstlerhaus – Halle für Kunst & Medien, Graz, Austria (2016)
- Trondheim kunstmuseum, Trondheim, Norway (2016)
- "parts-Wholes", The Wattis, San Francisco, USA (2017)
- "Popular Unrest", Kunsthaus Glarus, Glarus, Switzerland (2017)

== Performances ==
- "The Miner's Object 2006", Tate, 2007
- "Untitled 2011", Tate Modern, 2011

== Awards ==
- Paul Hamlyn Foundation Award for Visual Arts (2009-2010)
- Illy Present Future Prize (2010)

== Bibliography ==
- Gilligan, Melanie, "Prairial, Year 215", Veneer Magazine, 2007
- Gilligan, Melanie, "Five Scripts", Bard College Publications Office, 2009
- Gaitán, Juan, Melanie Gilligan, Antonia Hirsch, Candice Hopkins, "Intangible Economies", 2012
