= Fillip =

Contemporary art publishing organization

- Founded: 2004
- Founders: Jeff Khonsary, Jonathan Middleton, Sadira Rodrigues, Jordan Strom
- Country of origin: Canada
- Headquarters location: Vancouver, British Columbia
- Publication types: Books
- Official website: fillip.ca

Fillip is a Vancouver-based contemporary art publishing organization formed in 2004. It publishes a magazine as well as books of critical writing. The magazine with the same name was started in 2005. The publisher of the magazine is the Projectile Publishing Society, a Canadian non-profit.

In 2008, it opened an office on the border between Gastown and the Downtown Eastside from which it hosts month events including artist talks, publication launches, and screenings.

Fillip builds on Vancouver's tradition of critical art publishing such as the pre-magazine era Vanguard (1972–78), Boo (1994–98), and Last Call (2001–02) by stimulating conversations about contemporary art through critical writing, projects, and events.

== Books ==
Beginning in 2009, Fillip began publishing artist books and books of critical writing under the Fillip Editions imprint.

=== Supplement series ===
- Supplement 8: Circum (Carole Itter, Rhoda Rosenfeld, Trudy Rubenfeld, and Cheryl Sourkes), 2026
- Supplement 7: Joar Nango, 2023
- Supplement 6: Moyra Davey, 2022
- Supplement 5: Mr. Peanut Summit, 2019
- Supplement 4: grupa o.k, 2019
- Supplement 3: Toril Johannessen, 2018
- Supplement 2: Susanne Kriemann and Eva Wilson, 2017
- Supplement 1: John C. Welchman, 2015

=== Folio series ===
- Folio G: Leopoldina Fortunati and Carla Lonzi, Gendered Labour and Clitoridean Revolt, 2024
- Folio F: Eric Golo Stone, eds., Services Working, 2021
- Folio E: Jeff Khonsary and Antonia Pinter, eds., Institutions by Artists Vol. 2, 2021
- Folio D: Sohrab Mohebbi and Ruth Estévez, eds., Hotel Theory Reader, 2017 (co-published with REDCAT, Los Angeles)
- Folio C: Jeff Khonsary and Kristina Lee Podesva, eds., Institutions by Artists Vol. 1, 2012
- Folio B: Antonia Hirsch, ed., Intangible Economies, 2012
- Folio A: Jeff Khonsary and Melanie O'Brian, eds., Judgment and Contemporary Art Criticism, 2010 (co-published with Artspeak, Vancouver)

=== Artist's books ===
- Antonia Hirsch, Komma (After Dalton Trumbo' Johnny Got His Gun), 2011
- Silvia Kolbowski, Dear Silvia...July 2009, 2010
- Mark Manders, Traducing Ruddle, 2010 (co-published with Roma Publications, Antwerp)
- Sabine Bitter and Helmut Weber, Autogestion, or Henri Lefebvre in New Belgrade, 2009 (co-published with Sternberg Press, Berlin)

== Notable contributors ==
- Luis Camnitzer
- Paul Chan
- Diedrich Diederichsen
- James Elkins
- Maria Fusco
- Dan Graham
- Boris Groys
- Antonia Hirsch
- Candice Hopkins
- Miwon Kwon
- Sven Lütticken
- Metahaven
- Lawrence Rinder
- Slavs and Tatars
- Monika Szewczyk
- Jan Verwoert
