= Shane Wilson (sculptor) =

Canadian sculptor

- Known for: Sculptor, educator
- Movement: Abstract; Wildlife

Shane Wilson is a sculptor who has lived and worked in Yukon and British Columbia, Canada. His principal mediums are antler, horn, ivory, and bronze, from which he creates sculpture in his signature style, a juxtaposition of abstract organic and non-organic shapes.

== Public collections ==
- Brush Creek Ranch Permanent Art Collection: Curvy Caribou (Commissioned by Kevin Barry Fine Art Consultants for the Farm at Brush Creek, Cheyenne Club Entrance), Brush Creek, Wyoming, USA, 2021
- Yukon University: Ceremonial Antler (Commissioned by Jacqueline Bedard for donation to the Yukon University Foundation, to be carried at Yukon University Convocation Ceremonies), Whitehorse, Yukon, Canada, 2020
- The Four Seasons Hotel Toronto Permanent Canadian Contemporary Art Collection: Candle Ice Two (Commissioned by James Robertson Art Consultants and Yabu Pushelberg for the Four Seasons Hotel Toronto), Toronto, Ontario, Canada, 2012
- The Haines Junction Permanent Art Collection: Skullpture Series – Gaia (Donated in full by the artist), Haines Junction, Yukon, Canada, 2009
- The Yukon Arts Centre Gallery Permanent Collection: Self Portrait (Donated by Earl Bennett and the artist), Whitehorse, Yukon, Canada, 2009
- The Yukon Arts Centre Gallery Permanent Collection: Candle Ice, acquired 2008, Whitehorse, Yukon, Canada, 2008
- The Haines Junction Permanent Art Collection: Skullpture Series (Fourteen works in bronze, donated in full by the artist), Haines Junction, Yukon, Canada, 2007
- The Governments of Yukon, Northwest Territories and Nunavut: Three Northern Torches representing Yukon, Northwest Territories and Nunavut (each Territory’s representative Torch donated by the Canada Winter Games Host Society to that Territory for permanent display), Canada, 2007
- The Whitehorse 2007 Canada Winter Games: Three Northern Torches representing Yukon, Northwest Territories and Nunavut (Commissioned by Touch The North Inc. for donation to the Canada Winter Games Host Society), Whitehorse, Yukon, Canada, 2006
- Yukon Voice – mammoth ivory – 3x3in – 2004, collection of The Right Honourable Paul Martin, Prime Minister of Canada
- The Yukon Permanent Art Collection: Yukon Seasons (Donated in full by the artist, dedicated, with gratitude, to Ruth McCullough, for her hard work and singular dedication to fostering visual art and fine craft in Yukon), Whitehorse, Yukon, Canada, 2006
- The Yukon Hospital Foundation: Tundra Swan (commissioned as a symbol for the “Under Our Wings” Fundraising Campaign), Whitehorse, Yukon, Canada, 2005
- J.C. Wilson Chemicals Ltd.: Humpback Breaching (commission), London, Ontario, Canada, 2005
- The Collection of Yukon Member of Parliament, the Hon. Larry Bagnell: The Shooting of Dan McGrew – on loan to the MacBride Museum, Whitehorse, Yukon, Canada, 2004
- The Collection of The Right Honourable Paul Martin, Prime Minister of Canada: Yukon Voice (commissioned by the Yukon Territorial Government as a gift, upon his visit to Yukon, August 13–14), Montreal, Quebec, Canada, 2004
- Redism.com: A New Kind of Art Gallery: Virtual Art Competition and Gallery (sponsored by Bass Beer)- Award: First Place – Sculpture for Celtic Confusion, Online, 2003
- The Grand Slam Club: Faro Fannin, commissioned for Foundation for North American Wild Sheep (FNAWS) Convention, Reno Nevada, U.S.A., 2001
- The Collection of Yukon Supreme Court Justice, the Hon. Ron Veale: Denali (on display in his Chambers), Whitehorse, Yukon Canada, 2000
- The Yukon Permanent Art Collection: Raven: Bringer of Light (50% donation artist/50% purchase by Friends of the Gallery), Whitehorse, Yukon Canada, 2000
- Arctic Winter Games 2000: Denali (commission to represent Team Alaska), Whitehorse, Yukon Canada, 2000
- City of Dawson: Five Ivory Broaches (commission) Dawson City, Yukon Canada, 2000

== Publishing credits ==
- “Ou Est Winston Churchill: Le Vol du Château Laurier” - Crime Documentary - CBC TV, 2023
- Ceremonial Antler (video) – Brendan Preston, Director, Editor & Cinematographer; Lucy-Anne Kay, Story and Narration – produced for Yukon University Convocation 2020 & 2021 (during COVID protocols)
- Pieces of Canada – Exhibit Guide: 150 Objects – 150 Stories, by Suzanne Moase, Curator, Niagara Falls Museums, p. 34 Alces Madonna, Image and text, 2017
- Transforming the Unexpected: Artist to Collect – Shane Wilson, by Bret Anningson, Arabella Magazine: Canadian Art, Architecture and Design – Winter 2015, p. 160 – Borealis and Oreithyia, Big Horns Ram, Gaia, Tundra Swan, Yukon Seasons, Short Eared Parliament, Duality, Seahorses, Self Portrait, Dall Sheep Duality, Wolf-Pine Beetle Galleries – St. Andrews, New Brunswick, Canada, 2015
- Ornate Antler Sculptures by Shane Wilson, by Caro Buermann, Hi Fructose Magazine: The New Contemporary Art Magazine Blog – Gaia, Borealis and Oreithyia, Alces Madonna, Short Eared Parliament, Yukon Seasons, Duality, Candle Ice, Candle Ice Two, Male Seahorse – Richmond, California, U.S.A., 2015
- Carve, by Kent Wilson, Outdoor Lifestyle Magazine, Spring/Summer 2015, p. 88-89 – Short Eared Parliament – Dundas, Ontario, Canada, 2015
- Art Takes Times Square, p. 102, edited by Jeffrey Aldrich – Celtic Confusion – New York, New York, 2012
- "Fine Art at Four Seasons Toronto", by Elaine Glusac, Four Seasons Magazine - On Line Version, June 2012
- "True North", by Elaine Glusac, Four Seasons Magazine, Issue 2, p. 166, June 2013
- Ice Floe II, Cover art ("Self Portrait, 2009"), Edited by Shannon Gramse and Sarah Kirk, University of Alaska Press, Fairbanks, Alaska, 2011
- "Artist Workspaces: Shane Wilson's Studio", Branch Magazine: Private Parts, Issue 6, July 2011
- Algonquin Art Centre Blog and Newsletter: "Interview with Shane Wilson", Algonquin Art Centre, Algonquin Provincial Park, Ontario, Canada, June 2011
- "Artist Feature: Shane Wilson", International Year of Forests: An Artist's Perspective, Gallery Program 2011, Algonquin Art Centre, Algonquin Provincial Park, Ontario, Canada, Summer 2011
- "Feature Artist: Shane Wilson", Branch Magazine: Wild, Issue 5, April 2011
- Series Summer School of the Arts Course Catalogue Red Deer College (Detail of 'Male Seahorse' used on the cover and header graphics), Red Deer, Alberta, 2011
- "Wildfowl Art of a Different Nature", by Jim Clark (Jim details his learning experiences with master carvers Floyd Scholz and Shane Wilson), Wildfowl Art: The Journal of the Ward Museum of Wildfowl Art, Summer Issue, p. 22, 2010
- "Collaborations" ("The Shooting of Dan McGrew", with Dwayne Cull and Robert Service), Branch Magazine: Home, Issue 2.2, August 2010
- "Shane Wilson: Honouring the Power of Wild Life", by Todd Wilkinson, Wildlife Art Journal, Spring, 2010
- "Shane Wilson: Honouring the Power of Wild Life", by Todd Wilkinson, Trophy Rooms from Around the World, Vol. 15, p. 158-167, 2010
- Antlers: A Guide to Collecting, Scoring, Mounting, and Carving, by Dennis Walrod ("Celtic Confusion, 1998" pic and artist bio, page 158), 2005

== See also ==
- Ivory Carving
- Jim Robb (painter)
- List of Yukoners
