= Maria Fusco =

British scholarly expressionist

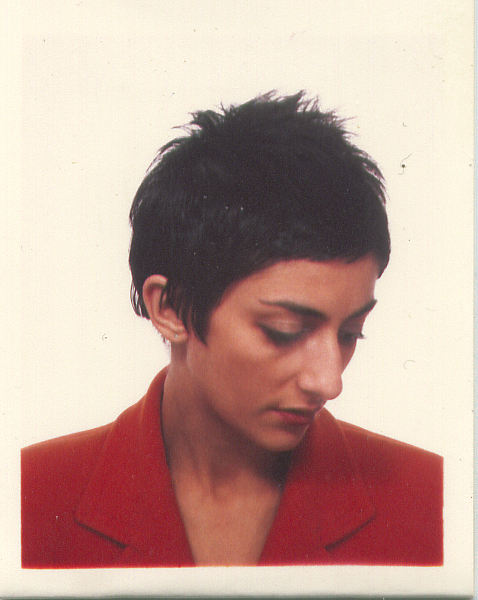
- Born: Belfast, Northern Ireland

Maria Fusco is a Belfast-born writer, lecturer, art critic, and events organiser. She was Director of Art Writing at Goldsmiths, University of London between 2007 and 2013 where she founded and led MFA Art Writing. She was a Senior Chancellor's Fellow (Reader) at Edinburgh College of Art, University of Edinburgh from 2013 to 2018, and was appointed Professor of Fine Art at Northumbria University in Sep 2018. Maria joined the University of Dundee as Professor of Interdisciplinary Writing in July 2020.

Her book of short stories The Mechanical Copula was published by Sternberg Press in 2010. Co-edited with Richard Birkett, Fusco's Cosey Complex, is the first major publication to discuss and theorise Cosey Fanni Tutti as methodology (published by Koenig Books in 2012).

In 2008, Fusco launched The Happy Hypocrite (Book Works: London), a semi-annual journal for and about experimental art writing, of which she was editor between 2008 and 2010, and remains as the journal's Editorial Director.

Maria Fusco was Writer in Residence at the Whitechapel Gallery, London in 2009/10, where she organised and hosted the one-day event 'Volatile Dispersal: Festival of Art Writing', and the inaugural Critic-in-Residence at Kadist Art Foundation in Paris (2008/09). Fusco has contributed to Art Monthly, Frieze, Fillip, and Mousse, (as well as many other publications).

Maria Fusco is currently writing Sailor, a novel about a monkey and a Browning Hi-Power pistol. Her screenplay for GONDA, a film by film-maker Ursula Mayer based around Ayn Rand's 1934 play Ideal, premiered in April 2012, commissioned by Film London. Fusco is the author of "The Legend of the Necessary Dreamer" (Vanguard Editions: London, 2017); a book of fictions that take place in Lisbon in an abandoned palace once owned by the Marquês de Pombal, who instituted the grid plan on which Lisbon was rebuilt after the 1755 earthquake; and "With A Bao A Qu reading When Attitudes Become Form" (New Documents: Los Angeles, 2013).
