= Antonia Hirsch =

Antonia Hirsch (born 1968, in Frankfurt on Main, West Germany) is an interdisciplinary artist who lives and works in Berlin.

== Life and work ==
Antonia Hirsch was educated at Central Saint Martins College of Art and Design in London, Great Britain. From 1994 to 2010, she lived and worked in Vancouver, Canada.

Hirsch's work engages a variety of media, including installation, film, video, and photography.

In her preface to Negative Space: Orbiting Inner and Outer Experience curator and writer Melanie O'Brian states "Antonia Hirsch's practice testifies to a long-standing engagement with the quantitative, spatial, and syntactic systems that structure an understanding of our universe... Hirsch's work relates these ordering structures to embodied and visual experience, considering how the equivocal and often ideological nature of these representational systems is expressed through a level of abstraction."

== Exhibitions ==
Hirsch's work has been featured in exhibitions such as Art In The Age Of...Planetary Computation at Witte de With Center for Contemporary Art, Rotterdam (2015); Komma (After Dalton Trumbo's Johnny Got His Gun), Tramway, Glasgow (2012); The Global Contemporary: Art Worlds After 1989 at ZKM | Center for Art and Media Karlsruhe (2011–12); and Universal Code at The Power Plant, Toronto.

== Collections ==
Hirsch's work can be found in the public collection of the Vancouver Art Gallery and the National Gallery of Canada.

== Publications ==
- Antonia Hirsch (ed.), Negative Space: Orbiting Inner and Outer Experience (with contributions by Theodor W. Adorno, Daniel Colucciello Barber, Lorna Brown, Elena Filipovic, Francois Laruelle, Olaf Nicolai, Ana Teixeira Pinto, Lisa Robertson, Wolfgang Winkler). Vancouver: SFU Galleries, 2015. ISBN 978-0-9868581-4-7
- Antonia Hirsch (ed.), Intangible Economies (with contributions by Juan A. Gaitàn, Melanie Gilligan, Hadley + Maxwell, Candice Hopkins, Olaf Nicolai, Patricia Reed, Monika Szewczyk, and Jan Verwoert). Vancouver: Fillip, 2012. ISBN 978-1-927354-03-2
- Antonia Hirsch, Komma (After Dalton Trumbo's Johnny Got His Gun), (with essays by Maria Muhle and Kristina Lee Podesva). Vancouver: Fillip, 2011. ISBN 978-0-9738133-9-5
