= Olivia Whetung =

First Nations artist, printmaker and writer

Olivia Whetung is a contemporary artist, printmaker, writer, and member of the Curve Lake First Nation and citizen of the Nishnaabeg Nation.

== Education ==
Whetung completed a Bachelor of Fine Arts with a minor in Anishinaabemowin at Algoma University. She holds a Master of Fine Arts from the University of British Columbia.

== Work and exhibitions ==
Whetung is known for her use of printmaking, digital media, beadwork, and topographic forms to discuss issues of Indigenous land and food sovereignty, knowledge transfer, language, and environmental stewardship. Whetung has collaborated with Jeneen Frei Njootli on several projects and presentations, and wrote Fugitive Dust to accompany Frei Njootli's solo exhibition, I Can't Make You Those Mitts Because There Is a Hole in My Heart and My Hands Hurt (2018) at Artspace in Peterborough, Ontario. In 2017, Whetung had a solo exhibition at Artspace called tibewh.

Whetung's work is part of the travelling exhibition, Soundings: An Exhibition in Five Parts. The exhibition was curated by Candice Hopkins and Dylan Robinson. The exhibition asked the question, "how can a score be a call and tool for decolonization?" A cumulative, changing exhibition, Soundings "shifts and evolves, gaining new artists and players in each location." Soundings was exhibited at the Morris and Helen Belkin Art Gallery, Kitchener-Waterloo Art Gallery, Gund Gallery at Kenyon College, Agnes Etherington Arts Centre, and Kamloops Art Gallery.

In 2019 to 2020, Whetung's solo exhibition, Sugarbush Shrapnel, was shown at the Contemporary Art Gallery in Vancouver, British Columbia. Whetung considered "her own connections to the complex ecosystem of her home on Chemong Lake, Ontario, particularly the importance of food sovereignty and the fragility of symbiotic relationships in an era of accelerating climate change and environmental destruction." This exhibition travelled to the Campbell River Art Gallery, from September to November 2020.

Whetung's work was part of the group exhibition, Beads, they're sewn so tight, which was curated by Beausoleil artist and curator Lisa Myers, and shown at the Textile Museum of Canada and Thunder Bay Art Gallery in September 2019.

== Awards ==
In 2020, Whetung was awarded the Ontario Arts Council's Emerging Artist Laureate Award. The Ontario Arts Council's Aboriginal Arts Awards "recognize the achievements of rising Indigenous artists and artistic leaders who have contributed to the arts in Ontario."

Whetung was the 2018 recipient of the John Hartman Award from the MacLaren Art Centre in Barrie, Ontario.
