= Joseph Tisiga =

- Born: 1984 (age 41–42); Edmonton, Alberta, Canada
- Known for: Painter

Joseph Tisiga (born 1984) is a multi-disciplinary artist and a member of the Kaska Dena Nation. He lives and works in Montreal, Quebec.

== Work ==
Tisiga's artistic practice includes performance, photography, sculpture, and installation, but painting and drawing are at the root of all his work. His work examines notions of identity, cultural and social inheritance, the mundane, the metaphysical and the mythological.

Interestingly, Tisiga outlined how his art practice connects with his family history and experience in a personal essay, "The Working Life of a Cultural Amnesiac" published by Canadian Art in 2017.

Collections of Tisiga's work are held by the National Gallery of Canada and the Musée des beaux-arts de Montréal. Exhibitions of Tisiga's work have been featured at the Audain Art Museum, the Kitchener-Waterloo Art Gallery, the Yukon Arts Centre, the Winnipeg Art Gallery, the Massachusetts Museum of Contemporary Art, the Museum of Contemporary Native Arts, the Ottawa Art Gallery and the West Vancouver Museum.

== Awards ==
Tisiga was the recipient of a REVEAL Indigenous Art Award / Prix en art autochtone from the Hnatyshyn Foundation in 2017 and a Historica-Dominion ‘Our Story’ Visual Arts Award in 2011.

Tisiga was long-listed for the Sobey Art Award in 2011 and in 2009 he was semi-finalist for the RBC Painting Competition.

In 2021, Joseph received Yukon Award for Visual Arts.

== See also ==
- Jim Robb (painter)
- Ted Harrison
