= Judith Lodge =

American Canadian painter and photographer

- Born: July 25, 1941 (age 84); Saint Paul, Minnesota, U.S.
- Known for: Painting, drawing, photography
- Movement: Abstract expressionism
- Website: www.jlodgearts.com

Judith Lodge (born July 25, 1941) is an American Canadian painter and photographer who often explores how the two mediums play off of and inform one another. Her abstract portraits of memories, situations, events, and people are inspired by the unconscious, dreams, journals, and nature. She has worked in Vancouver, Victoria, Toronto, Banff, Minnesota, and New York, where she has lived for more than thirty years.

== Background ==
Lodge was one of four daughters born to Jean Lodge in Saint Paul, Minnesota. Her father, James, was a chemist at 3M who enjoyed throwing pots in his free time and built a tiny studio in the basement of their home. From as early as the fourth grade, she would bring a large pad of paper to class and tell people, "You make a mark, I’ll make a drawing from it." She completed a Bachelor of Science at Macalester College in St. Paul (1963). She received a Master of Fine Arts from Cranbrook Academy of Art in Bloomfield Hills, Michigan (1965), where she was the only woman in a class of 12. In the summer following her MFA graduation, Lodge made numerous trips to New York City, where she attended large Alberto Giacometti and Francis Bacon retrospectives. These exhibitions were greatly influential on Lodge as they exposed her to approaches in art practice which were not being taken up by the Cranbrook school at that time.

== Artistic career ==
In 1972, Lodge moved to Vancouver, where she would spend the next decade, and began to work less figuratively than in earlier years. In Vancouver, she was friends with many women who were active in the women's movement. She had her first entirely non-figurative solo exhibition in 1977 at the Surrey Art Gallery. At some point, Lodge expected to return to figurative work but became preoccupied by the technical and aesthetic possibilities of the abstract format. Her inspiration from nature is greatly credited to time spent on an island off the coast of Vancouver, which was partly owned by a friend. Here, she explored landscapes and notions of water. Although Lodge returned to the United States in 1980, moving to New York after finding Vancouver a discouraging place for artists, she continually aims to recreate the feeling of nature in British Columbia. Lodge notes how dreams and unconsciousness bring things to one's attention, and claims she began making painted mandalas out of nowhere before finding out she had cancer. Following her diagnosis, chemotherapy, and surgery, Lodge became attracted to photographing trees which had been struck by fire yet were still alive, stating that she felt akin to them. These damaged arbutus trees can be seen in the series Trees Hit by Lightening and Other Fires.

== Style ==
Lodge's monumental abstract works, sometimes as large as 10'x16', partially derive from 1950s abstract expressionism. She typically utilizes a painterly style where thick layers and ropes of acrylic paint are built up in an almost three-dimensional topography, reminiscent of veins or sinews upon the surface of skin. The texture is built up in three or four steps and certain areas may be reworked in the process. Lodge often uses metallic gold, significantly in works from the "Life Jackets" and "Walls of Eden" exhibitions, symbolic of incorruptibility and sacredness, and confronting its audience rather than receding. She also tends to employ a strong sense of grid organization, as seen in the enormous works from "Walls of Eden."

== Themes ==
"As a kid in a museum it looks like there is everything to talk about and paint, but it turns out that there are really only a few things. The seductive part about being a painter, I find, is that life is not a candy jar but rather there are a few central issues toward which one directs one’s life. I can remember being in high school when I first saw a reproduction of the Gauguin, […] Where Do We Come From? What Are We? Where Are We Going… well, there it was—profound philosophic content painted and then restated in words right on the canvas in the most direct and flatfooted war. I was astounded. Certainly, the notion that there are major primal subjects to be dealt with in the subconscious, in myth, in dreams, etc. is part of my painting heritage" - Judith Lodge

Lodge's paintings demonstrate how the boundary between conscious and unconscious can be a permeable membrane. Along with the world of nature and recalling images from life and the unconscious, other topics Lodge addresses in her work include, concerns with intersecting and overlapping areas of change; the eternal and the intangible; documentation of life energies, of what is seen, felt, and remembered; the notion of beauty as not fixed; and beauty tinged with terror and decomposition.

== Professional activity ==
- 1969–1972 - Instructor: Painting and Drawing, Skidmore College, Saratoga Springs, New York
- 1969 - Instructor: Painting and Drawing, Vancouver School of Art Summer School
- 1970–1971 - Instructor: Painting and Drawing, Skidmore College, Saratoga Springs, New York
- 1972–1977 - Instructor: Painting and Drawing, Banff School of Fine Arts, Banff, Alberta
- 1975–1976 - Visiting Artist: Banff School of Fine Arts, Banff, Alberta (to 1980), Visiting Artist: Minneapolis School of Art, Visiting Artist: Macalester College, Visiting Artist: University of Victoria, Victoria, British Columbia
- 1976–1977 - Instructor: Painting and Drawing, University of Victoria, Victoria, British Columbia, Instructor: Painting and Drawing, University of British Columbia, Vancouver, British Columbia
- Assistant Professor: Painting and Drawing, College of St. Rose, Albany, New York
- Instructor, Lecturer, Visiting Artist: Emily Carr University of Art and Design, Vancouver, British Columbia
- Visiting Artist: York University, Toronto, Ontario
- 1993–2006 - Associate Chair: Illustration, Parsons School of Design, New York

== Exhibitions ==
- 1971 - Hathorn Gallery, Skidmore College, Saratoga Springs, New York
- 1972 - Wheelock College, Boston, Massachusetts
- 1973 - Bau-Xi Gallery, Vancouver, British Columbia
- 1974 - Bau-Xi Gallery, Vancouver, British Columbia
- 1975 - Bau-Xi Gallery, Vancouver, British Columbia
- 1977 - Surrey Art Gallery, Surrey, British Columbia
- 1977 - Walls of Eden, Pender Street Gallery, Vancouver, British Columbia
- 1977 - From This Point of View (Group Show), Vancouver Art Gallery, Vancouver, British Columbia
- 1978 - Targets, Victoria Art Gallery, Victoria, British Columbia
- 1978 - Fire, Smoke, Water, Ice, Art Core, Vancouver, British Columbia
- 1979 - Rites of Passage, Art Core, Vancouver, British Columbia
- 1984 - Recent Drawings and Paintings, Peter Whyte Gallery, Banff, Alberta
- 1986 - Life Jackets, University of British Columbia Fine Arts Gallery, Vancouver, British Columbia

== Grants/awards ==
- Canada Council Grant

== Collections ==
- Art Gallery of Greater Victoria
- Canada Council Art Bank
- Contemporary Art Gallery, Vancouver
- National Gallery of Canada
- Morris and Helen Belkin Art Gallery
