= David T. Alexander =

Canadian painter (born 1947)

- Born: David Thomas Alexander; January 13, 1947 (age 79); Vancouver, British Columbia, Canada
- Education: Vancouver School of Art (now Emily Carr University of Art and Design (1967–1970), Langara College Art Department, BC (1971–1972), Kootenay School of the Arts (then affiliated with the now defunct Notre Dame University), Nelson, BC, BFA (1975–1978), University of Saskatchewan, MFA (1985)
- Spouse: Judy Prestley (m. 1970; died 2018)
- Awards: Member in 2018, Royal Canadian Academy of Arts; Saskatchewan Arts Board grants (1982, 1984, 1988, 1990, 1993); Canada Council grant (1980)

David T. Alexander RCA (born January 13, 1947) is a Canadian painter, known for breathing new life into the landscape tradition of Canada as well as for working in a serious and ambitious manner to reinvigorate the contemporary practice of landscape painting.

== Biography ==
Alexander's mother and grandmother were painters and his mother, by chance, befriended the niece of Emily Carr's friend Ira Dilworth, bringing the painter and her influence into Alexander's world at an early date. He began painting seriously in 1966 in Steveston High School due to the encouragement of a tough but sympathetic art teacher, Mrs Stavrakoff. He attended the Vancouver School of Art and Design (today's Emily Carr University of Art and Design), Langara College (1967–1970), and Vancouver Community College (1971–1972), then attended art school in Nelson, British Columbia, at the Kootenay School of the Arts (then affiliated with the now defunct Notre Dame University) for a Bachelor of Fine Arts (BFA), graduating in 1978.

In 1979, Alexander attended one of the Emma Lake Artists' Workshops with Friedel Dzubas and John Elderfield, and, because of the positive experience he had in the workshop, moved to Saskatoon, Saskatchewan, in 1980. He continued to attend artists' workshops at Emma Lake, such as those given by Tim Scott (1984), and Maryann Harmon (1985). In 1985, he received a Master of Fine Arts (MFA) from the University of Saskatchewan and completed the thesis component of his degree on the work of Claude Monet. (Critics would later link his work to that of Monet and in his later painting, Alexander would sometimes use subjects that are related to Monet, especially to Monet's late work.) In 2003, he and his family moved to the Okanagan Valley, British Columbia, near Kelowna, British Columbia where he has his home and studio. In 2011, he himself was the workshop leader at Emma Lake.

Alexander has worked as an art instructor and has been a visiting artist at schools and galleries across Canada and internationally, including the Nova Scotia College of Art and Design; Beaverbrook Art Gallery in Fredericton, New Brunswick; the Iceland Academy of Fine Arts in Reykjavik; Portland College in Portland, Oregon; and Morris Graves Foundation in California, among others. He was elected a member of the Royal Canadian Academy. Alexander was featured in an episode of the Gemini Award-winning television series Landscape As Muse (2008). His work is discussed by critics along with John Hartman, and other artists pursuing the landscape tradition in Canadian art.

== Work ==
Alexander draws inspiration for his work from the unique character of the land, which he records in sketchbooks and sketches in preparation for more finished canvases. As a result, he has traveled extensively doing research for his work, including making trips to England, France, and the United States during his graduate research, and since then, travelling to the Arctic (1988), Scotland (to which he has gone several times), Iceland (1996, 2002), New Mexico and Arizona (1996), Nevada (2005), California (several visits as well), as well as making many trips to northern Ontario and Quebec, but he always combines his canonic subject matter (places without a great deal of human footprint) with abstraction. In 2004, the Globe and Mail wrote that he was an artist who could "simultaneously make convincing the reality of the scene before him…and make manifest, at the same time, the highly abstract dazzle of the visual information that makes up what we see". His painting has a "two-way grip", said the newspaper.

In his work of the 1980s, Alexander painted the prairie landscape, with its flat expanses and huge skies, as well as developing a thicker, more emphatic way of applying paint. During the 1990s, he sought to convey the structure and shapes of the forms that compose the mountains, varying his practice to create rectangles of either vertical or horizontal orientation, interspersed with near-square paintings as well as panoramic-format paintings. For imagery, he sometimes used an invented juxtaposition: a huge flower blooming in front of an Arctic landscape. Beginning in 2004 (after an initial inspiration in 2001), Alexander began to focus on water surfaces and their fleeting colour and light effects in his paintings.

== Selected exhibitions ==
Alexander's work has been exhibited in galleries across Canada, the United States, and Europe. In 2012, the exhibition David Alexander: The Shape of Place, curated by Liz Wylie for the Kelowna Art Gallery, went on a national tour. It opened with a major multi-author book published by McGill–Queen's University Press. The show, a retrospective, combined large and small paintings with works on paper and Alexander's sketches in sketchbooks. In 2019, Alexander's small works were exhibited at Bau-Xi Gallery in Toronto which accompanied the show with a publication titled, like the show, David Alexander Small Works. In 2023, Alexander showed 20 years of work in a show titled David T. Alexander: Revisiting at Peter Robinson Gallery in Edmonton. A talk on YouTube accompanied the show.

== Selected public collections ==
Alexander's works are represented in collections such the Canada Council Art Bank (Ottawa), Canadian Embassies (Warsaw and Beijing), Concordia University (Montreal), the University of Saskatchewan, Department of Foreign Affairs (Kuala Lumpur and Berlin), Edmonton Art Gallery, Institute of Art (Iceland), MacKenzie Art Gallery (Regina), Mendel Art Gallery (Saskatoon), Museum London, Ontario; Saskatchewan Arts Board, University of Toronto, and the Vancouver Art Gallery. He is represented by Bau-Xi Gallery and Evoke Contemporary in Santa Fe, New Mexico.

== Bibliography ==
- "The Marvel and the Menace: David Alexander Talks about Landscape". David Alexander: The Shape of Place. Montreal & Ithaca: Kelowna Gallery and McGill-Queen`s Press. 2012. pp. 70–81.
