= Edward Peghin =

Canadian producer and director

Edward Peghin is a lawyer and producer and director of television programs and feature films. He is also a writer and photographer for the automotive magazines Auto Enthusiast and Automotive Traveler.

== Career ==
Peghin was born in Toronto, Ontario, Canada. A lawyer and television producer and director, Peghin was the VP of Production, Producer and Director at WAS Productions, Co-Executive Producer and Series Director of the automotive documentary-lifestyle television series, Chop Cut Rebuild. The series ran for twelve seasons and aired on MAVTV (a Lucas Oil Racing network) during its latter years. In the final season, the series features the modification of a new 2016 Ford Cruising Van as an homage to the Cruising Vans of the 1970s. Chop Cut Rebuild is hosted by former Degrassi star, Dan Woods and airs on MAVTV (formerly airing on Fox's Speed network). Currently, Chop Cut Rebuild airs in Canada on Rev TV with all new episodes, having debuted on June 14, 2020. The series documents the restoration of classic American muscle cars over a thirteen episode season.

In 2012, Peghin and Woods were nominated for a national Daytime Emmy Award for Outstanding Lifestyle Program for Chop Cut Rebuild, the first such nomination for the series and for SPEED. In 2010 Peghin produced two feature-length films, the award-winning, comedy-horror, Trippin, written and directed by Devi Snively and the documentary Musicians in Exile, written and directed by Saroj Bains.

Peghin's first producing credit came in 1998 as the producer for the Canadian Broadcasting Corporation's Gemini Award-winning children's series, Scoop and Doozie. In 1999 Peghin was a series producer and a director of the Comedy Network's series, Slightly Bent TV, for which he was nominated for two Leo Awards in the categories of Best Music, Comedy or Variety Program or Series and Best Director of a Music, Comedy or Variety Program or Series. That same year, in 2000, he produced the series, Suckerpunch, also for the Comedy Network, which received a Leo-nomination for Best Editing in a Music, Comedy or Variety Program or Series.

Peghin was recruited by Vancouver animation studio Atomic Cartoons in 2003 to be the studio's Chief Operating Officer and Producer. During his tenure, Atomic Cartoons produced the award-winning series Atomic Betty and Captain Flamingo. In addition to his function as the studio's COO and producer, Peghin also acted as legal counsel for several of the productions. He also supervised several productions, including, KidsWorld Sports, Jacob Two-Two, as well as television commercials and a series of web commercials, Sara Under Siege, for Adams & Knight Advertising, which won a Mark of Excellence Award from the American Marketing Association.

Peghin executive produced the short film, Snow Bear, written and directed by emerging Yukon filmmaker, Iantha Diala Greer.
