= Charlotte Selina Bompas =

Missionary and memoirist in Canada

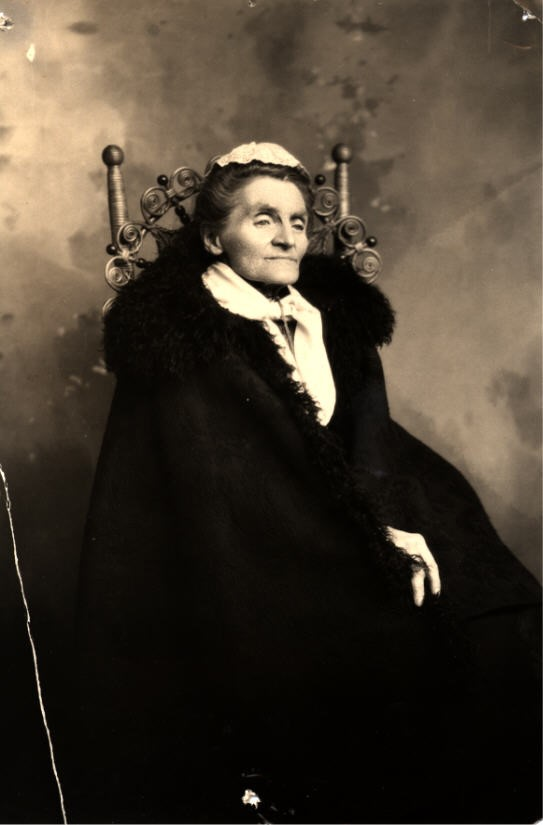
- Born: Charlotte Selina Cox; February 24, 1830
- Died: January 21, 1917 (aged 86)
- Occupations: missionary, speaker, memoirist
- Spouse: William Bompas (m. 1874; died 1906)

Charlotte Selina Bompas (née Cox; 24 February 1830 – 21 January 1917) was a missionary, speaker and memoirist in Canada.

== Early life ==
Most likely born in England, her parents were Charlotte Skey and Joseph Cox, and she was known as Nina. She spent much of her youth in Italy, and wrote for various magazines. She showed little interest in religion in her early life, but the 1871 murder of missionary John Patteson in the Solomon Islands apparently inspired her to turn towards evangelicalism in her midlife. She found an opportunity to become a missionary when, on 7 May 1874 she married her cousin, William Bompas, the first Anglican bishop of the Diocese of Athabasca in northwestern Canada.

== Missionary career ==
While living at a Hudson's Bay Company outpost in Athabasca Bompas started keeping a diary, recording her feelings of loneliness as her husband travelled for long periods seeking converts. She took on her own missionary work, learning to speak the Slavey language and to play the harmonium to enliven the austere church services. In 1876 she travelled to Fort Chipewyan on her own to make preparations for a new mission there.

Bompas was noted for her work with the local children, even informally adopting two children whose parents were ill, dead, or absent. One, Jenny or Jeannie, died in infancy, and the second, Lucy May (known as Owindia) appears to have died in England as a toddler. A modern commentator notes that Bompas approached missionary work with an "imperialist gaze": she frequently criticized the appearance, cleanliness and perceived wildness of the First Nations people. However, on other occasions she seemed to admire them, writing that the use of moss bags to carry infants was superior to the European practice of dressing infants in wool and cotton.

In 1884 Bombas returned to England for some time where she spoke to audiences about the Church Missionary Society's work in Canada. While in England she published a book, Owindia: A True Tale of the Mackenzie River Indians, North-West America, which was both a romantic tribute to her adopted daughter and a tool to promote her and her husband's missionary work.

For the next twelve years she spent time in England and Montreal, only rarely visiting her husband in the northwest, but in 1896 she returned to the Yukon at the beginning of the Klondike Gold Rush where she established a social center for the rapidly growing population of miners. In 1901 she went on a speaking tour in southern Canada, raising $800 for the establishment of a new church in Carcross.

Following her husband's death in 1906, Bombas moved to Montreal where she lived with her nieces. She continued to promote missionary work to audiences until her death in 1917. Twelve years later, her memoir was published by S. A. Archer as A Heroine of the North: Memoirs of Charlotte Selina Bompas (1830–1917), Wife of the First Bishop of Selkirk (Yukon), with Extracts from her Journals and Letters.
