= Karen Azoulay =

Canadian artist (born 1977)

Karen Azoulay (born 1977) is a multidisciplinary visual artist and author from Toronto, Canada. She is currently based in Brooklyn, New York.

== Artistic practice ==
Azoulay's artwork includes colorful sculpture, performance and installations. Her interdisciplinary works, which explore language, natural elements, and the female form, are often captured in film or photography finished with collage or paint. She uses ephemeral materials such as fresh flowers, clay, and her own body. In her exhibition Semi-Precious (2019) at Essex Flowers, Azoulay drew inspiration from a skeleton of an 11th-century German woman, who was found to have remnants of lapis lazuli on her teeth, indicating she was likely a manuscript illuminator. Azoulay's "Eating Flowers" motif, in which she consumes different flowers with dark, glitter-coated lips and teeth, explores ideas of vulnerability, nourishment, and decay.

=== Solo exhibitions ===
Solo exhibitions include CUE Art Foundation in New York, curated by Glenn Ligon, Fire Tale, Four Gallery in Dublin, Deep, Deep Under the Sea, Mercer Union in Toronto, Sculpture After the Apocalypse, Primetime, Brooklyn, The Botanist's Mime, Dose Projects, Brooklyn, and Indexing the Leaves, Methodist Archives, Drew University in Madison, NJ.

== Publications ==
In March 2023, Azoulay published a book on the Victorian language of flowers, titled Flowers and Their Meanings, The Secret Language and History of Over 600 Blooms.

Published by Clarkson Potter (an imprint of Penguin Random House), the 248-page book includes a foreword by bestselling author Kate Bolick, a dictionary of over 600 flowers, an index organized by theme, and essays about the history of floriography. It is illustrated with a combination of nineteenth-century botanical illustrations and Azoulay's own photography.

The book expands upon the topic of a booklet Azoulay self-published in 2015, titled Flowers and their Meanings, which also includes her photography and a dictionary of Victorian flower symbolism.
