= Alexandra Bischoff =

Canadian artist

- Born: 1991 (age 34–35); Edmonton, Alberta, Canada
- Education: BFA, Emily Carr University of Art and Design, 2015
- Known for: Artist, Writer
- Website: http://www.alexandrabischoff.com/

Alexandra Bischoff (born 1991 in Edmonton, Alberta) is a Canadian artist who works primarily in performance, with an emphasis on sexuality and feminism. She lives and works in Montréal, Quebec.

== Life and education ==
Bischoff received a Fine Art Diploma in 2012 from McEwan University, Alberta, Canada. She holds a Bachelor of Fine Arts in Visual Art from Emily Carr University of Art + Design, where she was named valedictorian of her 2015 undergraduate class. She is currently pursuing a Master of Fine Arts at Concordia University in the department of Intermedia (Video, Performance, and Electronic Arts).

== Work ==
Bischoff's artistic practice, primarily in performance, video, and text, responds to the complexities of female sexuality and is influenced by her research engaging with archives. Bischoff's archival research led to the Rereading Room, an exhibition of the Vancouver Women's Bookstore's inaugural 1973 catalogue. The Rereading Room initially was at exhibited at 221A in 2016-17 and, in 2018, was included in the Beginning with the Seventies: GLUT at the Morris and Helen Belkin Gallery.

Also in 2018, Bischoff participated in the group exhibition SOOT, emerging from her publication of the same name. SOOT is a recount of Bischoff's experiences having been employed at a retail sex shop in Vancouver.

In 2017, Decoy Magazine published Happenstance, a series of temporary artworks by eleven artists including Bischoff, who worked in public spaces in the city of Vancouver. For this project, Bischoff explored the senses as her main theme for her work thrum. She performed her piece by walking across and interacting with the Granville Bridge in a time-based performance.

Bischoff has been critical of Wikipedia's gender imbalance and has worked with the Morris and Helen Belkin Gallery to address it through their annual Art+Feminism Wikipedia Edit-a-thon.

== Major works ==
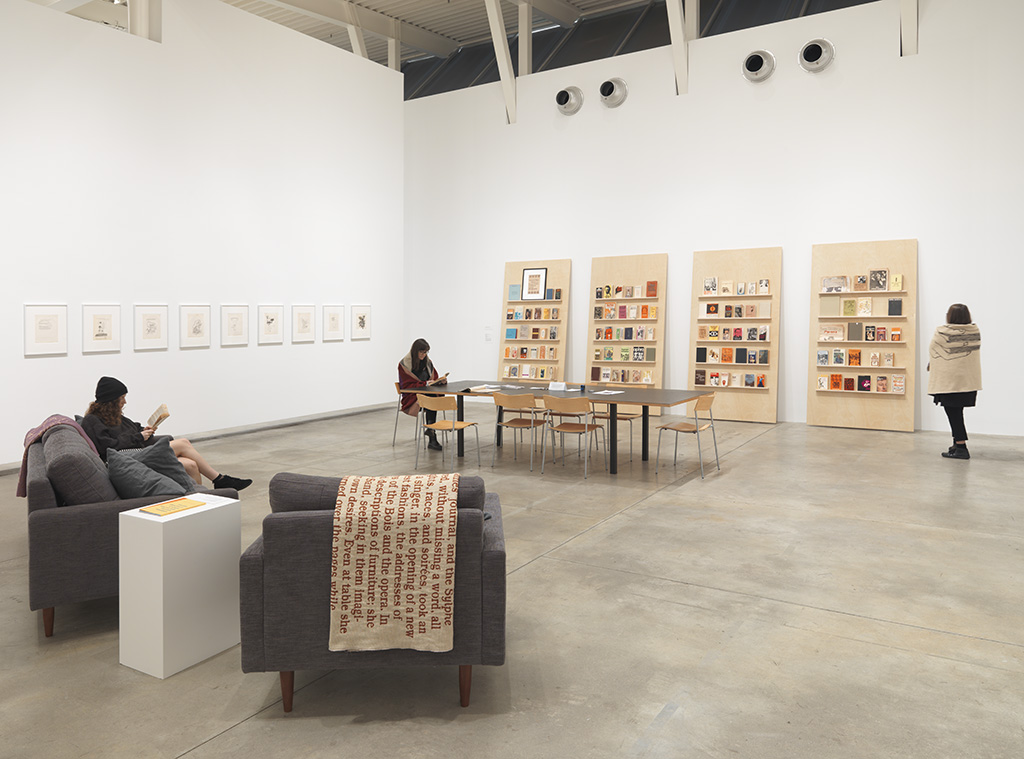
Alexandra Bischoff, Rereading Room: The Vancouver Women's Bookstore (1973-1996), 2016-18, texts chosen from the 1973 Vancouver Women's Bookstore catalogue. Collection of the Morris and Helen Belkin Art Gallery. Photo: Rachel Topham

- L'origine, Plucked (2018)
- Rereading Room (2018) Bischoff's archival research led to the Rereading Room, an exhibition the Vancouver Women's Bookstore's inaugural 1973 catalogue. Rereading Room's first iteration was exhibited at 221A in 2016-17.
- Soot (2017-2018)
- thrum (2017)
- I Feel Pretty performance and video (2016)
- Skin on Skin (2016)
- Suds-bucket (2015)
- Iron-Woman... (2014)

== Awards and residencies ==
- RBC Artist Development for her performance L'origine, Plucked (2018) in the Calgary performance festival IKG LIVE 2.
- 221A Artist Run Centre, N.O.P.E. research group (Vancouver, B.C.)
- Burrard Arts Foundation, writing residency (Vancouver, B.C.)

== Exhibitions ==
- Beginning with the Seventies: GLUT (12 January - 8 April 2018)
- IRL:URL
- Rereading Room (10 November 2016 - 14 January 2017)
- SOOT (16 December 2017 - 21 January 2018)
- Transmutations

== Publications ==
- "Tongue in Shape." Catalogue essay for Sarah Davidson. Scrap Collector, Gam Gallery. 2016. Print.
- "Usually only temporarily." LAUGH Magazine 3. (2017): 30-31. Print.
- GAGS. "Theory Boner" Nov. 2014. Print.
