= Artexte Information Centre =

ARTEXTE Information Centre
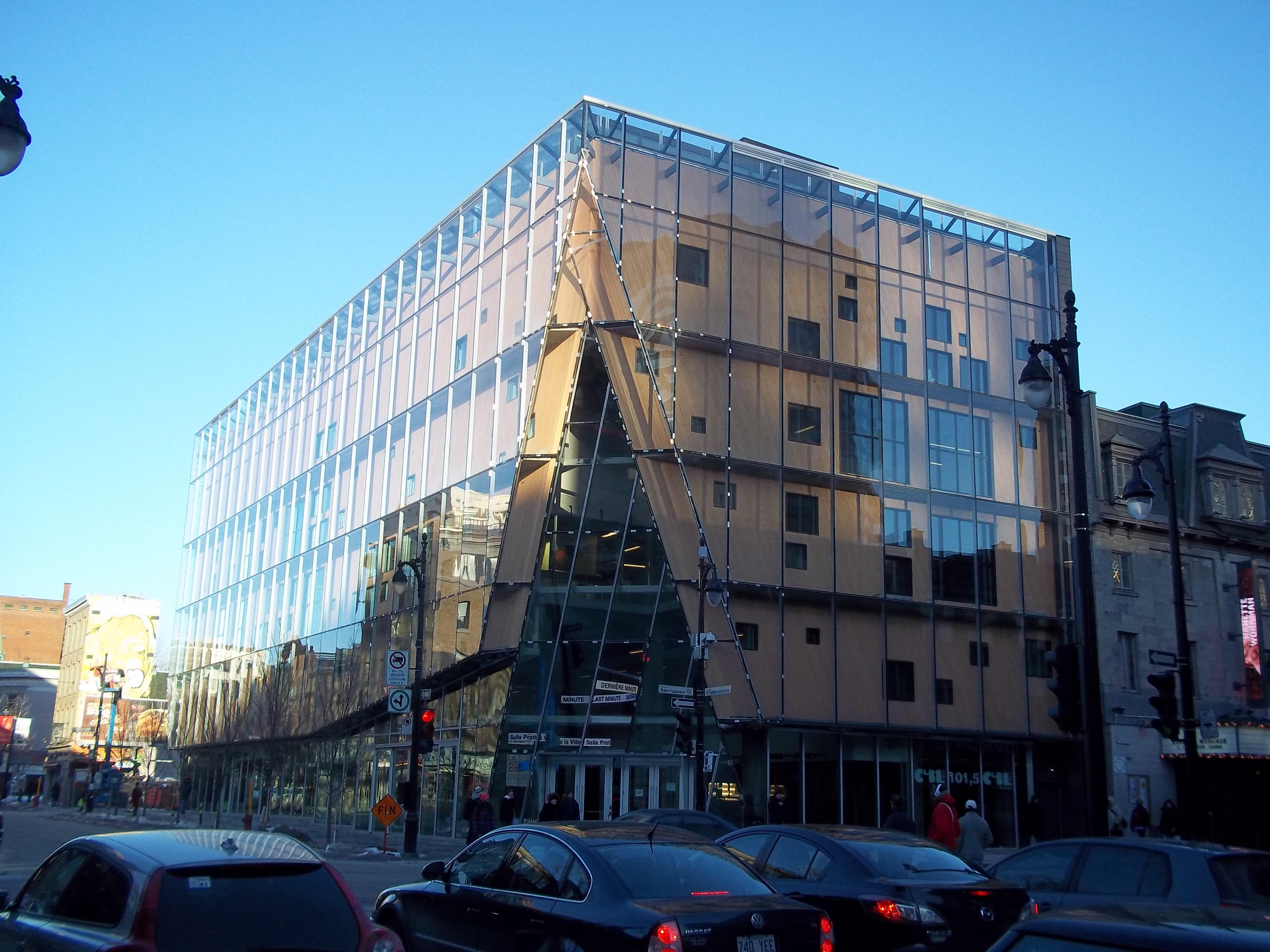
- 2-22 Building
- 45.51021536931861°N 73.56310976728183°W
- Location: Montreal, Canada
- Established: 1980

Other information
- Website: www.artexte.ca

Artexte (in French: Centre d'information Artexte) is an independent, federally chartered not-for-profit arts organization in Montreal, Quebec, Canada. Its principal mandate is to focus on research, interpretation and dissemination initiatives in order to broaden the influence and appreciation of contemporary visual arts. These activities are informed by a significant collection of art documentation and authoritative resources, as well as a network of multidisciplinary partners. Artexte's partnerships and alliances are built with others who also seek to bring attention to the value of documentation produced by the study and practice of contemporary art. Artexte affirms the presence of experimental, innovative and critical components of this field. Its activities touch on all aspects of contemporary visual art from 1965 to today, with special emphasis placed on Quebec and Canada.

Through its bilingual reference services and research assistance, the Centre provides a user-friendly interface between its collection and researchers from Canada and abroad.

== History ==
Established in 1980 by art historian Francine Périnet and artists Angela Grauerholz and Anne Ramsden, Artexte began as a bookstore specializing in Canadian and International contemporary art. The organization responded to an essential need in Quebec and Canada for up to date, accurate information on contemporary visual art. In order to realize their objective of disseminating this information, the founders opened a documentation centre in Montreal. They then created Artextes Editions, which today comprises about 20 titles. Artexte also set up a national service for the distribution of exhibition catalogues and independent publications on contemporary art. In 1997, this service was transferred to a private business specializing in the distribution of this type of document, ABC Art Books Canada. In 1993, the bookstore moved into the Musée d'art contemporain de Montréal. Two years later Artexte let go of its bookstore operations, which were passed on to Librairie Olivieri in September 1995, under a partnership agreement respecting the initial objectives of Artexte's mandate. The Librairie Olivieri du Musée closed its doors in 2009.

In May 1996, Artexte moved to a larger space at 460 Sainte-Catherine Street West. This move marked the beginning of a new era for the organization and its users, by positioning Artexte within the heart of a network frequented by artists and researchers of contemporary art.

In 2012, Artexte moved to new premises in Montreal's vibrant Quartier des spectacles. Artexte now occupies a large, luminous space on the third floor of the 2-22 Building (at 2 Sainte-Catherine Street East). In addition to having a larger consultation area for research purposes than before, it opened a new exhibition space. The gallery's programming is linked to print culture and addresses issues pertaining to visual arts documents.

== Collection ==
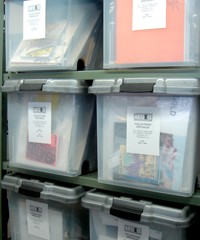
The Mobilivre-Bookmobile Project Collection at Artexte

The collection of Artexte Information Centre includes:

- 30,000 publications and visual, audio or digital documents
- 11,000 documentation files for arts organizations, events, subjects and disciplines, etc.
- 4,500 Canadian artists' files
- 3,000 non-Canadian artists' files
- Canadian and foreign art periodicals
- special collections of artists' publications including the Mobilivre-Bookmobile Project collection of artists' books, zines, multiples, etc., "A Relatively Small Collection" and "Galerie Largeness"

The collection of Artexte is non-circulating.

== Access ==
The study centre is open to the public Wednesdays to Fridays (noon to 7 pm) and Saturdays (noon to 5 pm); and the gallery is open Wednesdays to Fridays (noon to 7 pm) and Saturdays (noon to 5 pm). Free to all. Standard holidays apply.

Artexte's website includes several research tools for accessing documents in the collection. e-Artexte is an Open-Access digital repository for publishing in contemporary Canadian art and the online catalogue for the collection.

== Activities ==
- Research residencies
- Publishing: Artextes Editions
- Exhibitions

== Bibliography ==
- Guédon, Jean-Claude, Darren Wershler, Tomasz Neugebauer, John Latour and Corina MacDonald. "Actes du lancement de e-artexte: dépôt numérique en libre accès pour les documents en arts visuels du Canada / Proceedings from the launch of e-artexte: open access digital repository for visual arts in Canada." Montreal: Artexte, 2014.*Guédon, Jean-Claude, Darren Wershler, Tomasz Neugebauer, John Latour and Corina MacDonald. Actes du lancement de e-artexte: dépôt numérique en libre accès pour les documents en arts visuels du Canada / Proceedings from the launch of e-artexte: open access digital repository for visual arts in Canada. Montreal: Artexte, 2014.
- Léger, Danielle. "Le centre d'information Artexte : médi(t)ations autour du catalogue d'exposition et de la francophonie." Art Libraries Journal v. 21, n. 3, 1996.
- Léger, Danielle. "Le centre d'information Artexte: un mandat, et un parcours, atypiques." Essays in the History of Art Librarianship in Canada. ARLIS Canada, 2006.
- MacDonald, Corina, Tomasz Neugebauer and John Latour. "The e-artexte digital repository: promoting open access in Canadian contemporary arts research and publishing community." Art Libraries Journal v. 39, n. 1, 2014.
- Tayler, Felicity & Latour, John. "Contemporary Glocal: positioning a national mandate within a global context." Art Libraries Journal v. 34, n. 1, 2009.
