= George C. Bompas =

British solicitor and astronomer

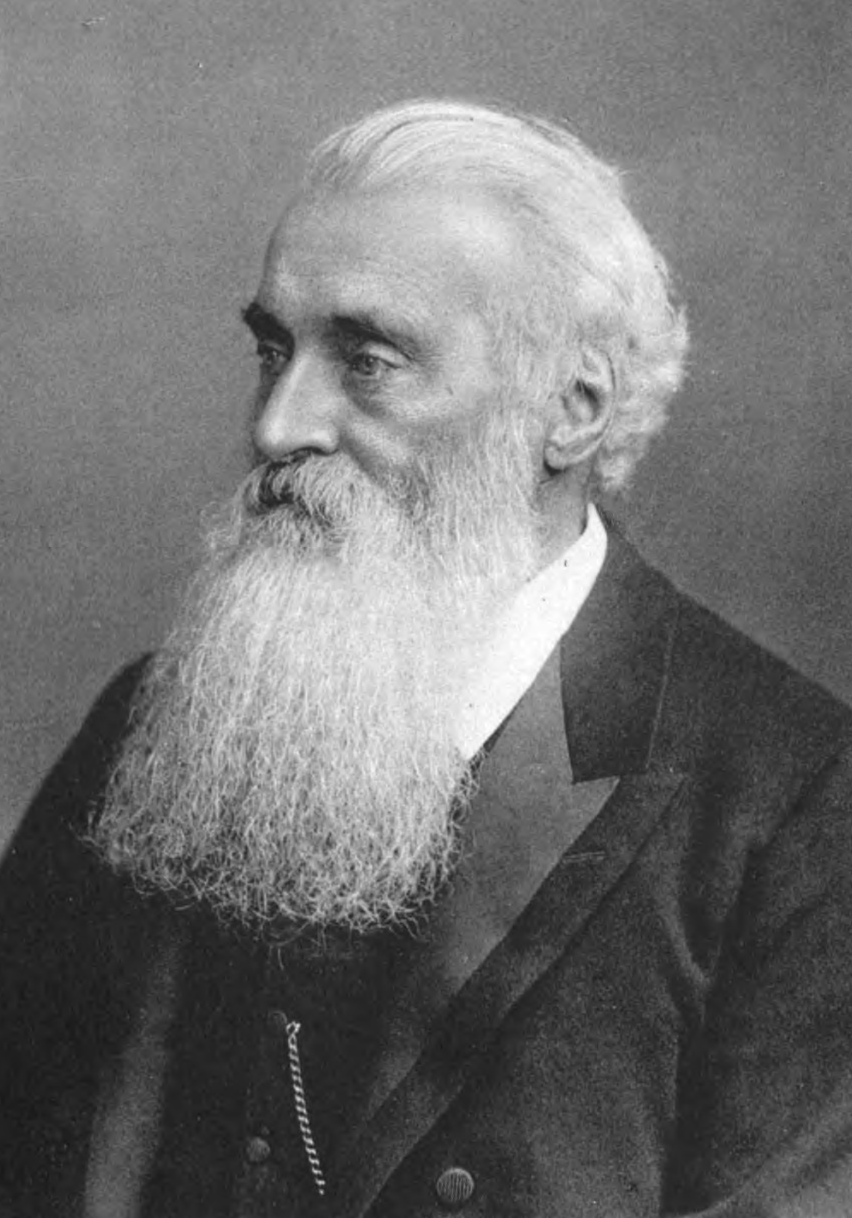
- Born: 18 April 1827; Bloomsbury
- Died: 23 May 1905 (aged 78)
- Occupations: Solicitor, astronomer

George Cox Bompas (18 April 1827 – 23 May 1905) was a British solicitor and astronomer.

Bompas was born in Bloomsbury. He was the second son of Serjeant Charles Carpenter Bompas. His brother was William Bompas.

Bompas was admitted as a solicitor in 1850 and continued to practice until 1903. He worked for the law firm Bischoff, Coxe and Bompas and was a solicitor for several of their companies. He later was employed as a lawyer in the George Earl Church debt contract with Bolivia.

He married May Anne Scott Buckland, daughter of Rev. William Buckland, in 1860. They had four children. Bompas took interest in astronomy and studied periodic meteor showers and the Zodiacal light. He was elected a Fellow of the Royal Astronomical Society on 14 December 1894. He was a Fellow of the Royal Geographical Society, the Geological Society and the Paleontological Society.

In 1896, Bompas authored a paper for the Victoria Institute of which he was a member titled "On evolution and design" which argued for a form of theistic evolution. This was controversial because such a position usually invited disapproval from the Victoria Institute's membership who favoured creationism. However, Bompas was a solicitor from a well-regarded Baptist family so his paper received an unusually mild reaction.

== Selected publications ==
- Life of Frank Buckland: By His Brother-in-law (1885)
- The Problem of the Shakespeare Plays (1902)
