= Elizabeth Zvonar =

Canadian artist

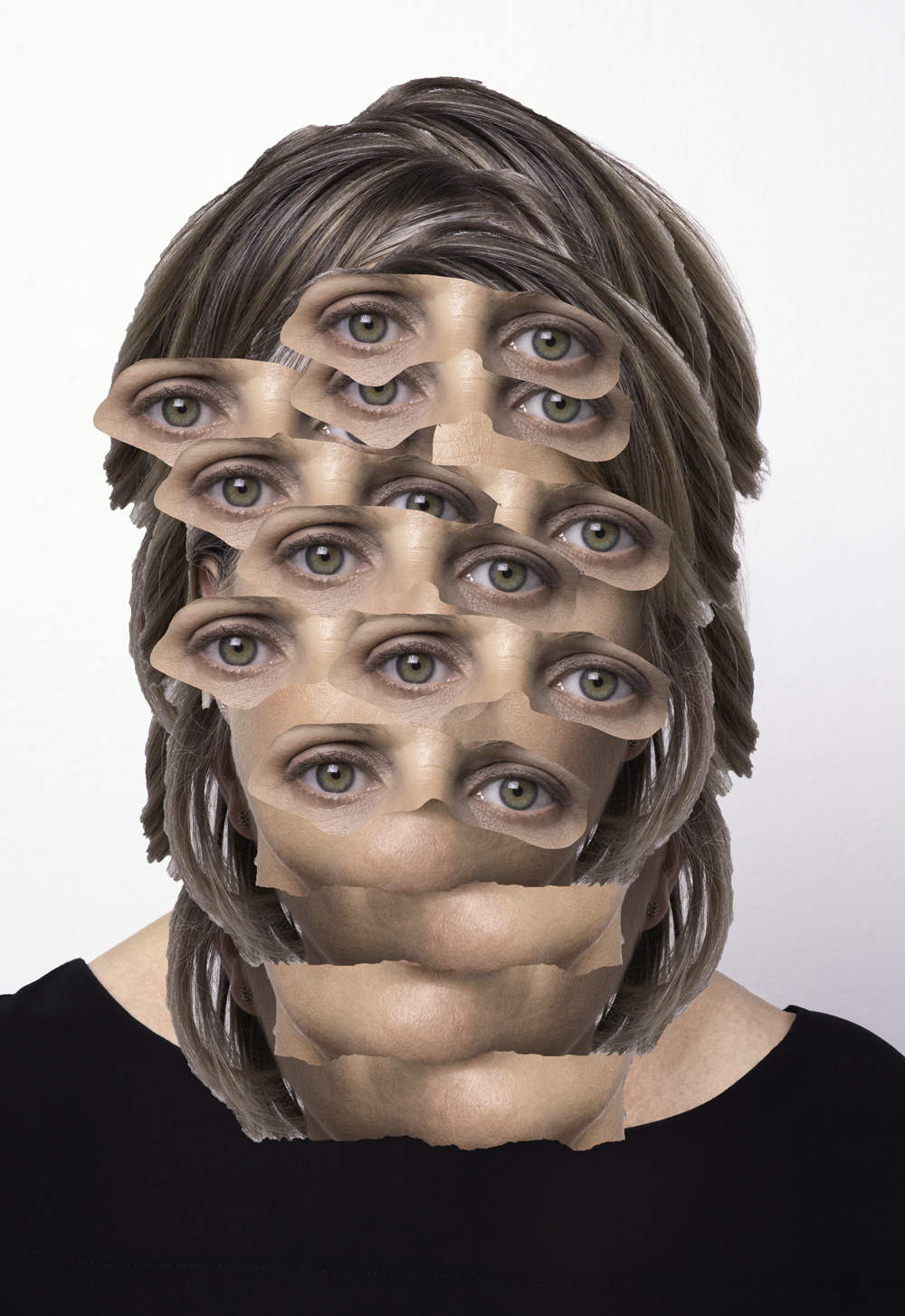
- Elizabeth Zvonar, Headshot, Verdant, 2016, inkjet print.
- Born: 1972 (age 52–53); Thunder Bay, Ontario
- Education: BFA, Emily Carr University of Art and Design, 2002
- Known for: Collagist, sculptor
- Website: www.elizabethzvonar.com

Elizabeth Zvonar RCA (born 1972) is a Canadian contemporary artist who works primarily with mixed-media collage and sculpture based in Vancouver, British Columbia, Canada. She is currently represented by Daniel Faria Gallery, Toronto, Ontario, Canada.

== Life and education ==
Zvonar was born in Thunder Bay, Ontario. She has attended Aichi Gakusen University in Toyota City, Japan (1994), Capilano College in North Vancouver, Canada (1995), and Hokkaido University of Art & Design in Sapporo, Japan (1996). She ultimately received a BFA at Emily Carr Institute of Art and Design in Vancouver, Canada in 2002, the same institution that would later reward her with the Emily Award for Outstanding Achievement by an Emily Carr Alumna in 2011.

== Work ==
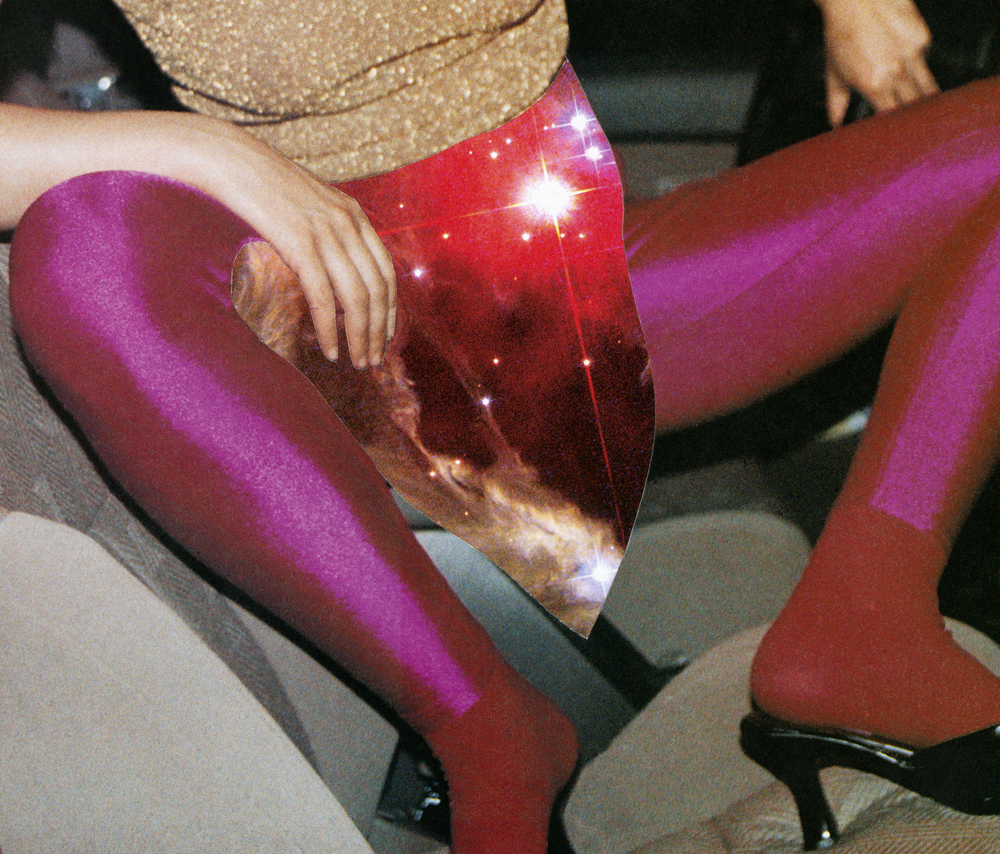
Elizabeth Zvonar, Origin of the World, Peaches in Space, 2010, inkjet print on Kodak semi-matte paper. Collection of the Morris and Helen Belkin Art Gallery.

Working extensively with collage materials, Zvonar’s practice works towards presenting a new history by collecting images from a variety of sources (advertisements, lifestyle, and art history) and reinterpreting them through juxtaposition. By working with images of the female body, Zvonar’s work reinterprets the use of female representation through a reductive and additive process that investigates the nuances and disparities of printed material in relation to identity formation.

== Solo exhibitions ==
Zvonar has exhibited at the Contemporary Art Gallery, Daniel Faria Gallery, Artspeak, and the Vancouver Art Gallery Offsite. In 2017, Zvonar participated in a residency at the Burrard Arts Foundation, where she exhibited her solo show To You it Was Fast.

Her work THE CHALLENGE OF ABSTRACTION was exhibited at the Daniel Faria Gallery, Toronto from May 2 to June 6, 2015. Zvonar exhibited collages, sculptures, and casts. One of her featured works, IT’S THE GAPS THAT CHANGE THE SEQUENCE, "presents two different images of open legs arranged in a mesmerizing spiral."

In 2018 her show Banal Baroque was presented at Daniel Faria Gallery, which explored themes of "bodily and sexual excess" by "recontextualizing mass-produced objects, mass media objects, magazines, and mannequin parts to animate the uncanny treatment of the human figure that lies dormant in this source material." Her work is noted to evoke Surrealist and Dadaist collage, particularly those of Hannah Höch.

Among the exhibited works were Marcel Meets Judy (2013), which featured a "mass-produced pink seashell candy dish." This object was rendered obsolete from its function and references Marcel Duchamp’s readymades and Judy Chicago’s porcelain vagina-flowers in The Dinner Party, 1974–1979.

== Artworks in collections ==
Elizabeth Zvonar's artworks can be found in the following collections:

- Burnaby Art Gallery
- Neuberger Berman
- Toronto-Dominion Bank
- Vancouver Art Gallery
- Morris and Helen Belkin Art Gallery

== Solo exhibitions ==
Zvonar has exhibited both group and solo exhibitions across Canada, Australia, Belgium, Japan and in New York.

- Cut & Paste. 2020. Vancouver: Capture Photography Festival.
- I Spy. 2020. North Vancouver: Polygon Gallery.
- Milky Way. 2019. Toronto: .Contact Photography Festival.
- Ageless Ambiguity. 2018. Toronto: Daniel Faria Gallery.
- The Future Is Coming Everyday. 2017. Coquitlam: Evergreen Cultural Centre.
- To you it was fast. 2017. Vancouver: Burrard Arts Foundation.
- The Experience. 2015. Vancouver: Vancouver Art Gallery Offsite.
- THE CHALLENGE OF ABSTRACTION. 2015. Toronto: Daniel Faria Gallery.
- I Really Do Believe The Best Thing A Person Can Do With Themselves Is To Expand Their Minds. 2014. Vancouver: Gallery 295.
- Banal Baroque. 2013. Toronto: Daniel Faria Gallery.
- On Time. 2009. Vancouver: Contemporary Art Gallery.
- There Are No Rules. 2009. Vancouver: The Western Front.
- Super Human Be In. 2008. Vancouver: Malaspina Printmakers.
- Parallel Dimension: 2007. Vancouver: Artspeak Gallery.

== Awards ==
- 2016 AIMIA | AGO Photography Prize (Shortlisted)
- 2015 VIVA AWARD, The Jack and Doris Shadbolt Foundation for The Visual Arts
- 2012–15 City of Vancouver Artist in Residence Award
- 2011 Emily Award, Outstanding achievement by an Emily Carr Alumna, Emily Carr University
- 2009 City of Vancouver Mayor’s Award, Emerging Visual Artist
- 2007 VADA (Vancouver Art Development Award)
