= Silvia Kolbowski =

Argentine-born American artist (born 1953)

- Born: 1953 (age 72–73); Buenos Aires, Argentina
- Occupation: Artist

Silvia Kolbowski is an Argentine-born American artist who works primarily with video and installation formats, often using historical figures and events to allegorically analyze cultural phenomena and power imbalances.

Her widely-exhibited video project "an inadequate history of conceptual art," (2000) recorded the videotaped responses of 22 artists who were asked by Kolbowski to describe a work of conceptual or performance art that they had witnessed in the 1960s and ‘70s, without doing contemporary research. The identities of artists speaking were not revealed and the speakers were instructed not to name the artist or the title of the work they described. Kolbowski maintains anonymity visually by filming only the hands of the respondents as they speak, later projected at large scale in a room separate from the audio. Kolbowski is neither seen, nor does she interact with the speakers.

Although in the title Kolbowski identifies this work as a “history” of conceptual art, and the ensuing testimonies, at first, appear to constitute an archive of documentary evidence supporting that claim to historicity, by qualifying that history as inadequate, Kolbowski foregrounds the fallacies inherent in claims to stable historical fact.

An Inadequate History of Conceptual Art is also a work of conceptual art in its own right, shaped by an artist who is conspicuous in her absence.

Her video projects on Ulrike Meinhof and Rosa Luxemburg reanimate historical figures who speak to contemporary issues of violence, hypocrisy, and political resistance. Her works are also informed by aspects of feminist and psychoanalytic theory. For example, in an early series, Model Pleasure (1982), Kolbowski appropriated images of women from mass-media sources to create grids of images that make allusions to the ways that women are defined by such imagery.

Her work has been exhibited in The Tapei Biennial, the Villa Arson (Nice), the Whitney Biennial, and the Hammer Museum, and others. She has had solo exhibitions at the Museum of Modern Art (Ljubljana), the Center for Contemporary Art (Warsaw), The Secession (Vienna), LAX<>ART (Los Angeles), and the Bina Ellen Gallery (Montreal). In 2023, the Museum of Modern and Contemporary Art, Geneva [MAMCO], acquired nine works by Kolbowski, ranging from the years 1986-2019.

Silvia Kolbowski was born in 1953 in Buenos Aires, Argentina. She earned an associate degree from the experimental Franconia College], New Hampshire in 1974. Kolbowski earned her B.S. from Hunter College, graduating magna cum laude in 1980. She was a fellow at The Institute for Architecture and Urban Studies from 1980 until 1983.

Kolbowski was a co-editor of October journal between 1993 and 2000. She has taught at the Whitney Independent Research Program, the CCC program of the Ecole Superiéure d'Art Visuel, Geneva, the Architecture Department of Parsons The New School for Design, NY, and the School of Art at The Cooper Union. In 2019 her archive was acquired by the Bard College, Center for Curatorial Studies Archive. In 2023, MAMCO Geneve acquired a collection of 14 of her works.
