= Angela Grauerholz =

German-born Canadian photographer, graphic designer, and educator (born 1952)

- Born: January 10, 1952 (age 74); Hamburg
- Education: University of Hamburg; Concordia University MFA (1976)
- Awards: American Federation of Arts Award of Excellence; Prix Paul-Emile-Borduas; Governor General's Award in Visual and Media Arts
- Website: Official website

Angela Grauerholz (born January 10, 1952) is a German-born Canadian photographer, graphic designer and educator living in Montreal.

== Biography ==
Grauerholz was born in Hamburg and completed studies in graphic design at the Kunstschule Alsterdamm there and studied literature and linguistics at the University of Hamburg. She came to Canada in 1976 and, with the help of a grant from the Canada Council, completed a MFA degree in photography at Concordia University. During the 1980s, she operated a graphic design studio, working on magazines, catalogues and books. In 1988, she began teaching graphic design at the Université du Québec à Montréal; in 2008, she became director of the Centre of Design there.

She was one of the founders of the Artexte Information Centre in 1980. She has digitized much of her own work as well as her personal archive of images from newspapers and other sources. She is represented by galleries in Montreal, Toronto, Berlin and Paris Grauerholz also holds the title of Professor Emerita at the Université du Québec à Montréal (UQAM).

== Style ==
Her photographic work is distinguished by a hazy quality produced using long exposures and overlapping images. Her images of commonplace subjects take on a feeling of timelessness. Grauerholz continued to experiment, later incorporating the use of multiple images and sculpture into her installations.

Grauerholz' later work explores themes of unconscious experience and the passage of time. Notable projects, including her series of 16 notable women in the Montreal arts scene shot between 1984 and 1985, often eschew classic formal photographic 'rules' in favour of stylized portraiture. Grauerholz tends to prefer a multi-image series format, as opposed to singular images.

== Exhibitions & Awards ==
She has exhibited her work at Canadian and international exhibitions such as La Biennale de Montreal in 2002, the Biennale of Sydney in 1990, Documenta 9 in Kassel in 1992 and the Carnegie International in Pittsburgh in 1995. The Canadian Museum of Contemporary Photography presented a retrospective of her work in 2010. Grauerholz has also held solo shows at the Musée du Québec and the Museum of Contemporary Photography in Chicago.

Grauerholz has received numerous awards for her work, including the Award of Excellence from the American Federation of Arts, the Prix Paul-Émile-Borduas the Governor General's Award in Visual and Media Arts and received an honorary doctorate from Emily Carr University in 2018.

Her work is included in the collections of the Stedelijk Museum Amsterdam, the Art Gallery of Ontario, the Montreal Museum of Fine Arts, the National Gallery of Canada, the Musée d'art contemporain de Montréal and the Vancouver Art Gallery.

== Exhibitions ==
- 2019: The Empty S(h)elf, Artexte, Montreal
- 2019: Chennai Photo Biennale, Chennai
- 2016: Scotiabank Photography Award, Ryerson Image Centre, Toronto
- 2014: Olga Korper Gallery, Toronto
- 2012: Art 45, Montreal
- 2011: Olga Korper Gallery, Toronto
- 2011: Angela Grauerholz: the inexhaustible image...épuiser l'image, University of Toronto Art Center (UTAC), Toronto
- 2010: Angela Grauerholz: the inexhaustible image...épuiser l'image, National Gallery of Canada/Canadian Museum of Contemporary Photography (CMCP), Ottawa
- 2010: McMaster Museum of Art, McMaster University, Hamilton
- 2009: www.atworkandplay.ca, VOX, centre de l'image contemporaine, Montréal
- 2008: Reading Room for the Working Artist, Vancouver Public Library, Vancouver, part of the exhibition Memory Palace (3 artists in the library) held between 2008 and 2009
- 2008: Ladder of Ascent and Descent, part of Aperture Banners, Vancouver Public Library, Vancouver
- 2008: Art 45, Montreal
- 2008: Olga Korper Gallery, Toronto
- 2006: Reading Room for the Working Artist, VOX, centre de l'image contemporaine, Montreal
- 2004: Reading Room for the Working Artist, Olga Korper Gallery, Toronto
- 2003: Reading Room for the Working Artist + Privation, Blaffer Galley, The Art Museum of the University of Houston, Houston
- 2002: Privation, Contemporary Art Gallery, Vancouver
- 2001: Privation, Olga Korper Gallery, Toronto
- 1999: Sentencia I - LXII, Albright-Knox Art Gallery, Buffalo Dorsky Gallery Curatorial Programs, New York
- 1999: Sentencia I - LXII, The Power Plant Art Gallery, Toronto
- 1999: Sentencia I - LXII, Galerie Reckermann, Cologne
- 1999: Olga Korper Gallery, Toronto
- 1995: Angela Grauerholz, curator: Paulette Gagnon, Musée d'art contemporain de Montréal
- 1992: documenta 9, Kassel

== Collections ==
- Stedelijk Museum, Amsterdam
- DG Bank, Frankfurt
- Collection Bunderstag, Berlin
- Museum of Fine Arts, Dole
- Musée de Tourcoing, Tourcoing
- FNAC (Fonds national d'art contemporain), France
- FRAC (Fonds régional d'art contemporain), France
- Carnegie Museum of Art, Pittsburgh
- Modern Art Museum of Fort Worth, Fort Worth
- The Museum of Fine Arts, Houston
- Albright-Knox Art Gallery, Buffalo, New York
- Musée d'art contemporain de Montréal, Montreal
- Musée des Beaux-Arts de Montréal, Montreal
- Musée national des beaux-arts du Québec, Québec
- Rare Books Library, McGill University, Montréal
- National Gallery of Canada, Ottawa
- Department of External Affairs, Ottawa
- Art Gallery of Ontario, Toronto
- Art Gallery of Windsor, Windsor
- McMaster Museum of Art (McMaster University), Hamilton
- Oakville Galleries, Oakville
- Mendel Art Gallery, Saskatoon
- Norman Mackenzie Art Gallery, Regina
- Vancouver Art Gallery, Vancouver

== Awards ==
- Governor General's Award in Visual and Media Arts (2014)
