= Althea Thauberger =

Canadian artist (born 1970)

Althea Thauberger (born 1970, Saskatoon, Canada) is a Canadian visual artist, film maker and educator. Her work engages relational practices rooted in sustained collaborations with groups or communities through social, theatrical and textual processes that often operate outside the studio/gallery environment. Her varied research-centric projects have taken her to military base, remote societies and institutional spaces that result in performances, films, videos, audio recordings and books, and involve provocative reflections of social, political, institutional and aesthetic power relations. Her recent projects involve an extended engagement with the sites of their production in order to trace broader social and ideological histories.

== Biography ==
Althea Thauberger currently lives and works in Vancouver, where she is an associate professor in the Department of Art History, Visual Art and Theory at the University of British Columbia.

Thauberger obtained her Bachelor of Fine Arts in Photography at Concordia University in 2000 and went on to complete her Master of Fine Arts at the University of Victoria in 2002. In 2009–2010, she studied at the European Graduate School as a PhD candidate. Before Thauberger's professorship at University of British Columbia, she had taught at Emily Carr University of Art and Design, Simon Fraser University, and University of Victoria as a sessional instructor, and was invited to teach at Akademie výtvarných umĕni v Praze (Academy of Fine Arts, Prague) as a guest professor, and at Concordia University as a visiting professor.

In 2003, Thauberger was awarded a Vancouver Arts Development Award and was a regional finalist for the Sobey Art Award. She was also the recipient of British Columbia's most prestigious annual awards for the visual arts, VIVA award in 2011.

In 2009, Thauberger travelled to Kandahar, Afghanistan, on a Canadian Forces Artists Program assignment. While there, she produced the collaborative work Kandahar International Airport (2009), in which twelve female soldiers portray themselves as themselves on the grounds of this Afghan modernist architectural icon from the 1960s.

== Major works ==
=== Preuzmimo Benčić (Take Back Benčić) (2014) ===
Set against the political and economic context of the former Yugoslavian state, on the site of Benčić, the former worker-managed factory in Rijeka, the fifty-seven minutes experimental film explores themes of labor, social class, and alternative models of governance.

Thauberger initiated the film as a framework for continuing a critical and generative dialogue about the multiple values of the factory, the restructuring of Rijeka's political economy, and the paradigms of cultural industries. She worked with sixty-seven local children performers who are divided into the roles of "artists" or former workers who have been permitted to temporarily re-occupy the complex, and "mayors" who discuss their own plans for its regeneration. By using children as her cast, Thauberger is able to conjure an inviting illusion of play whilst still encouraging scrutiny of the larger issues underlying the project and the potential socioeconomic failures related to creative regeneration. Preuzmimo Benčić, is akin to 20th century forms of radical theatre, such as Bertolt Brecht's Lehrstücke or techniques within Augusto Boal's Theatre of the Oppressed. In both forms, there is no division between the actors and the audience and play-acting is employed as an instructive process. Thauberger sees the explorations of the relations between work, art and play as the fundament of this project, and her experience of working with children as mutual empowerment process that invokes imagination, wonder and empathy.

=== Marat Sade Bohnice (2012) ===
Thauberger produced Marat Sade Bohnice in collaboration with Akanda, an experimental theatre company in Prague. The forty-seven minute film centres on the staging of the decommissioned waterworks and laundry facilities of Bohnice, another post-revolutionary institution and the largest psychiatric clinic in the Czech Republic. It consists of filmic documentation of the Bohnice psychiatric hospital performance as a reenactment of Peter Weiss' 1963 play Marat/Sade, as well as documentation of Thauberger's interviews with Bohnice patients and staff. As Thauberger brings various threads together—particularly as she includes hospital staff and residents in the work—she inserts a raw humanism into her deep-time inquiry of mental illness, pointedly linking Marat's revolutionary apprehension to growing contemporary cynicism about institutions. Marat Sade Bohnice approaches philosophical and art histories, questions art's agency and its role within therapy, as well as troubles the systems of human (un)freedom.

== Notable exhibitions ==
Her work has been presented at the 17th Biennale of Sydney; National Gallery of Canada, Ottawa; The Andy Warhol Museum, Pittsburgh; Guangzhou Triennial, China; Manifesta 7, Trento, Italy; Exponential Futures at the Morris and Helen Belkin Art Gallery, Vancouver; The Power Plant, Toronto; Vancouver Art Gallery; BAK—basis voor actuele kunst, Utrecht; Künstlerhaus Bethanien, Berlin; Kunstverein Wolfsburg, Germany; Art Gallery of Nova Scotia, Halifax; Singapore History Museum; Presentation House Gallery, Vancouver; Museum van Hedendaagse Kunst, Antwerp; Berkeley Art Museum; Insite, San Diego/Tijuana; The Polygon Gallery, Vancouver; White Columns, New York; Seattle Art Museum; and the 2012 Liverpool Biennial. Thauberger participated in the 2014 Biennale de Montréal.

== Solo exhibitions ==
- Althea Thauberger | Pagal Pagal Pagal Pagal Filmy Duniya, Contemporary Art Gallery, Vancouver (2020)
- Althea Thauberger: The State of the Situation, Art Gallery of Nova Scotia, Halifax (2019)
- Althea Thauberger: Who Is It That Will Tell Me What I Am, Southern Alberta Art Gallery, Lethbridge (2018)
- Althea Thauberger: PhotoLab 5, National Gallery of Canada, Ottawa (2018)
- Althea Thauberger: Marat Sade Bohnice, Audain Gallery, Simon Fraser University, Vancouver (2014)
- Althea Thauberger Solo Exhibition, Susan Hobbs Gallery, Toronto (2012)
- Althea Thauberger: Zivildienst ≠ Kunstprojekt, Musée d'art contemporain de Montréal, Montreal (2012)
- Althea Thauberger, Künstlerhaus Bethanien, Berlin (2006)
- Althea Thauberger: Matrix 215, Berkeley Art Museum, Berkeley (2005)

== Collections ==
Thauberger's work is included in the permanent collection of the National Gallery of Canada.
