= William Bompas =

British clergyman and missionary

William Carpenter Bompas
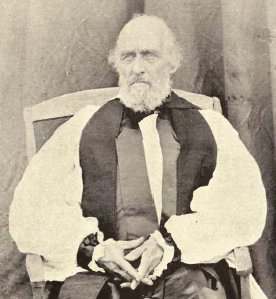
- Born: 20 January 1834; Regent's Park, London, England
- Died: 9 June 1906 (aged 72); Carcross, Yukon, Canada
- Known for: First Bishop of Athabasca, Mackenzie River and Selkirk

William Carpenter Bompas (20 January 1834 – 9 June 1906) was a Church of England clergyman and missionary in northwestern Canada, first Anglican bishop of the Athabasca diocese, then of the Mackenzie River diocese and then of the Selkirk (Yukon) diocese as these dioceses were successively carved out of the original Rupert's Land diocese.

Born in London, England, he died in Carcross, Yukon. His wife Charlotte Selina (Cox) Bompas participated in his missionary work, and wrote Owindia: A True Tale of the Mackenzie River Indians, North-West America.

== Early life ==
William Carpenter Bompas was born on January 20, 1834, at Regent's Park, London to father Charles and mother Mary Steele. It is thought that Charles Carpenter Bompas served as the inspiration for Charles Dickens' Buzfuz in The Pickwick Papers. It is thought that Bompas' heritage lay in France, although members of the extended family resided in the United States and the United Kingdom.

From 1844, a string of family deaths left the family in poor circumstances. When William was aged ten, in February 1844, his father Charles died, leaving his eight children. His eldest son, also named Charles, died in 1847.

William's early education was supplied by a graduate of Cambridge University. Partly due to his private tuition and a lack of socialisation, William was considered a shy boy, and in his spare time preferred to sketch buildings such as churches instead of participate in games. His tutor, a Mr Elliott, believed Bompas to be of high intellect, writing:

I never had a pupil who made such acquisitions of knowledge in so short a time; his attainments in mathematics and classics are far beyond the majority of youths at his age, and would warrant anyone conversant with the state of education in the Universities in predicting a brilliant career for him, should he ever have that path open to him. I think, however, that the development of his mind is still more remarkable than the amount of his knowledge.

However, William Carpenter Bompas did not choose to pursue a university education, instead opting to become articled in the same law firm where his brother George C. Bompas was working. After his five years of service, he transferred to another company, which soon collapsed, causing great stress to Bompas. When his strength returned, Bompas decided to leave the Baptist denomination to join the Church of England, becoming confirmed in 1858 and ordained a deacon in 1859. He was appointed curate in a church at Sutton in the Marsh, which had not had a resident clergyman since the 16th century. The area did not have a school, and in the face of considerable opposition, Bompas had opened one within two years.

In 1861, Bompas' mother died, but undeterred, William transferred to another somewhat 'wild' parish in Nottingham. After a short stint in South Lincolnshire, Bompas returned to Alford, Lincolnshire, where he took up a curate position. Soon after, the Church Missionary Society granted him a post in Rupert's Land, Canada to relieve a bishop. Bompas was quickly ordained into the priesthood and sent away to Canada.

== Arrival in Rupert's Land ==
Bompas' journey began on June 30, 1865, when he left London for Liverpool, from where he was to take a steamer to New York. From New York Bompas travelled to Niagara via the Hudson River and railway, subsequently making his way to Chicago, La Crosse and St. Paul. Upon reaching St. Cloud, a problem presented itself to Bompas' travelling party. In 1862, a Sioux massacre occurred, and the local Indians were wary of another attack. However, Bompas was advised that they would respect the English flag. Although the party did not have an English flag on hand, Bompas took initiative and crafted a banner for their ox-carts. This was just as well, as Indians who had ridden up in their horses to survey the ox-cart party left them alone once they spotted their flags.

Bompas eventually reached the Red River Colony, and from there, he was rowed by Salteaux Indians in Hudson's Bay Company boats. The Methye Portage was reached on October 12, too late to catch a boat going further north due to the ensuing winter. Bompas engaged a crew to row him further north, reaching Fort Chipewyan, Alberta after days of struggle against the cold. Although he was invited to stay the winter at Fort Chipewyan, this offer was rejected, Bompas preferring to push further ahead. When the river became frozen over, his party continued by land, reaching the safety of Fort Resolution mid-winter. After a month's stay there, he was dispatched from there armed with snowshoes and a strong party. Bompas was determined to reach Fort Simpson before Christmas Day, and that he did, drawing into the entrance to the Fort on Christmas morning.

== Later life ==
Bompas was to remain at Fort Simpson only for a short while. After a brief education in the Indian language there, he continued on to Fort Norman and set up a school there, before returning to Fort Simpson in August 1866. It was decided that Bompas should not be given a post to tend to, rather he should be given a roving commission, which pleased him greatly. Returning to Fort Norman, Bompas began to learn the Slavey language before leaving for Fort Rae in January 1867. In August 1868, after over a year travelling around various Forts, Bompas returned to Fort Simpson to take charge of that mission post after the resignation of the previous missionary there.

In 1873, Bompas was nominated as the first bishop of the new diocese of Athabasca, in the northwest of his present diocese. Although he was not initially pleased at the prospect of presiding over such a large area, he was convinced otherwise, and in May 1874 Bompas was consecrated bishop of Athabasca at a church in London. He immediately returned to Canada. In 1884, his diocese was divided again, and Bompas became the first bishop of Mackenzie River. In 1891, Bompas moved into the Yukon with the creation of a new diocese, Selkirk. In 1905, he resigned from his position as bishop, and on June 9 the following year, he died at Carcross, Yukon.

== Bibliography ==
- Portions of the Book of Common Prayer, hymns, etc., in the Chipewyan Language. By Archdeacon Kirkby. Adapted for the use of the Slavi Indians by the Right Rev. W.C. Bompas. London: SPCK, 1882.
- Northern Lights on the Bible Drawn from a Bishop’s Experience during twenty-five Years in the Great North-West. London: J. Nisbet, 1893.
- Diocese of Mackenzie River. London: Society for Promoting Christian Knowledge; New York: E. & J. B. Young, 1888.
