= Jim Robb =

Canadian artist (born 1933)

Jim Robb CM
- Kissing Buildings by Jim Robb, circa 2015
- Born: James I. Robb; 1933 (age 92–93); Quebec City, Quebec, Canada
- Known for: Painter
- Style: Exaggerated truth
- Awards: Queen Elizabeth II Golden Jubilee Medal; Member of the Order of Canada; King Charles III Coronation Medal

James I. Robb CM (born 1933) is a Canadian artist known for his paintings celebrating the life, culture and history of the Yukon.

== Early life ==
Robb was born in 1933 in Quebec City, Quebec, and moved to Montreal with his family when he was six years old. In 1955, Robb moved to the Yukon, and currently resides in Whitehorse. Robb worked various jobs in the Yukon until eventually taking up painting.

== Career ==
Robb began his artistic career working with pastels and charcoal on raw moose hide, eventually finding his way to watercolour paintings and photography.

Robb attempts to capture the folklore of the Yukon in his paintings, and is widely known for his rustic depictions of contemporary and historic Yukon landmarks and buildings. Robb's artistic style, known as "exaggerated truth", takes inspiration from Yukon’s famous lopsided and leaning structures, particularly those found in Dawson City, which is exemplified by his 2015 painting, Kissing Buildings. Robb's work is widely featured in books, magazines and newspapers, with originals of his watercolours selling for thousands of dollars (CAD).

Robb is also the author of The Colourful Five Per Cent, the first volume of which was published in 1984. Each softcover volume contains an assortment of unique photographs, sketches, paintings and essays, and tells the stories of the Yukon's most extraordinary inhabitants.

== Honours ==
Robb was awarded the Queen Elizabeth II Golden Jubilee Medal in 2002, and appointed a Member of the Order of Canada on October 30, 2003, in recognition of his artistic achievements. In 2025, Robb was awarded the King Charles III Coronation Medal.

== See also ==
- Joseph Tisiga (artist)
- Shane Wilson (sculptor)
- Ted Harrison (painter)
