= Ted Harrison =

English painter (1926–2015)

Ted Harrison CM, RCA
- Born: Edward Hardy Harrison; August 28, 1926; Wingate, County Durham, England
- Died: January 16, 2015 (aged 88); Victoria, British Columbia, Canada
- Known for: Painter

Edward Hardy Harrison CM RCA LL.D. (August 28, 1926 – January 16, 2015) was an English-Canadian artist who created many paintings of the Yukon.

== Early life and education ==
Ted Harrison was born in Wingate, County Durham, England, in 1926. He started to paint at the West Hartlepool School of Art in England. Although interrupted by war, Harrison went on to complete his studies, being awarded a National Diploma in Design from the College in 1949. His subsequent earning of a teaching certificate from the University of Durham and a B.Ed from the University of Alberta, led to a teaching career that lasted almost three decades.

== Career ==
Beginning in 1968, Harrison resided in Yukon, Canada, a location with prominence in many of his works. He stayed there until 1993. His work from this period focused on the colours and culture of the Yukon.

He worked, from the 1970s and thus in his post-academic capacity, not only as an artist but also as an illustrator and author. His work in the field earned him a national first: selection for the International Children’s book Exhibition in Bologna, Italy. One of his illustrations is of the Robert Service poem "The Cremation of Sam McGee". He often tried unexpected colours to depicted features.

In 1987, Harrison was made a Member of the Order of Canada for his contributions to Canadian culture. He also held honorary doctorates from Athabasca University (1991), the University of Victoria (1998) and the University of Alberta (2005). He was made a member of the Royal Canadian Academy of Arts

== Personal life ==
Harrison's wife, Nicky, died from Alzheimer's disease in 2000. Harrison subsequently helped raise money for Alzheimer foundations. Harrison died in his sleep at the age of 88 on January 16, 2015.

== Personal archive ==
In 2011, Harrison donated his personal archive to the University of Victoria's Library.

== See also ==
- Jim Robb (painter)
