= Parlow =

Parlow is a surname. Notable people with the surname include:

- Cindy Parlow Cone (born 1978), American soccer executive and president of the United States Soccer Federation
- Frank Parlow (born 1967), German former yacht racer
- Kathleen Parlow (1890–1963), Canadian violinist
- Maida Parlow French, Canadian author and artist
- Matthew J. Parlow, Dean of Chapman University School of Law

== See also ==
- Parlov
