= Rob Schneiderman =

Rob Schneiderman may refer to:

- Rob Schneiderman (mathematician) (born 1957), American mathematician
- Rob Schneiderman (politician) (born 1967), American politician
