= Mark Axelrod =

American writer and academic

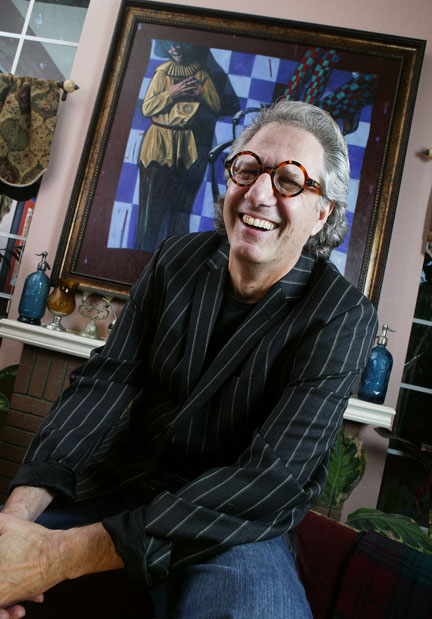
- Photo of author and professor of comparative literature Mark Axelrod
- Occupation: Novelist Screenwriter Professor
- Writing career
- Notable works: Secret Histories: Borges' Travel, Hemingway’s Garage; Capital Castles; Cloud Castles; Cardboard Castles

Mark Axelrod is an American writer and academic, who is a professor of Comparative Literature in Chapman University's Wilkinson College of Humanities and Social Sciences. For twenty-five years he has been the Director of the John Fowles Center for Creative Writing, which has received five National Endowment for the Arts Grants.

== Education ==
Axelrod received his Ph.D. in Comparative Literature from the University of Minnesota Twin Cities, and received both his B.A. and M.A. in Comparative Literature from Indiana University Bloomington. He also received fellowships to study/teach at Edinburgh University and Oxford University, as well as receiving four Fulbrights to teach in Brazil, Sweden, Denmark and Norway. In addition, he has taught creative writing throughout Europe and Latin America.

== Career ==
As a practicing screenwriter, Axelrod has published four books on screenwriting: Aspects of the Screenplay; Character & Conflict; I Read It At the Movies; and Constructing Dialogue: Screenwriting from Citizen Kane to Midnight in Paris. He has written more than 25 screenplays and teleplays, the latest of which is titled Malarkey, which garnered the interest of Malcolm McDowell. Axelrod has received awards from the Academy of Motion Picture Arts and Sciences; the Writers Guild of America, East; the Screenwriters Forum (University of Wisconsin); and the Sundance Institute.” He has also won awards from the Scottish Association of Filmmakers Award in Screenwriting, Edinburgh, Scotland, in 1993, and the London International Film & Video Festival, Silver Seal Award for Screenwriting, London, England, in 1991. In 2018, he was inducted as a member of the European Arts and Sciences Association.

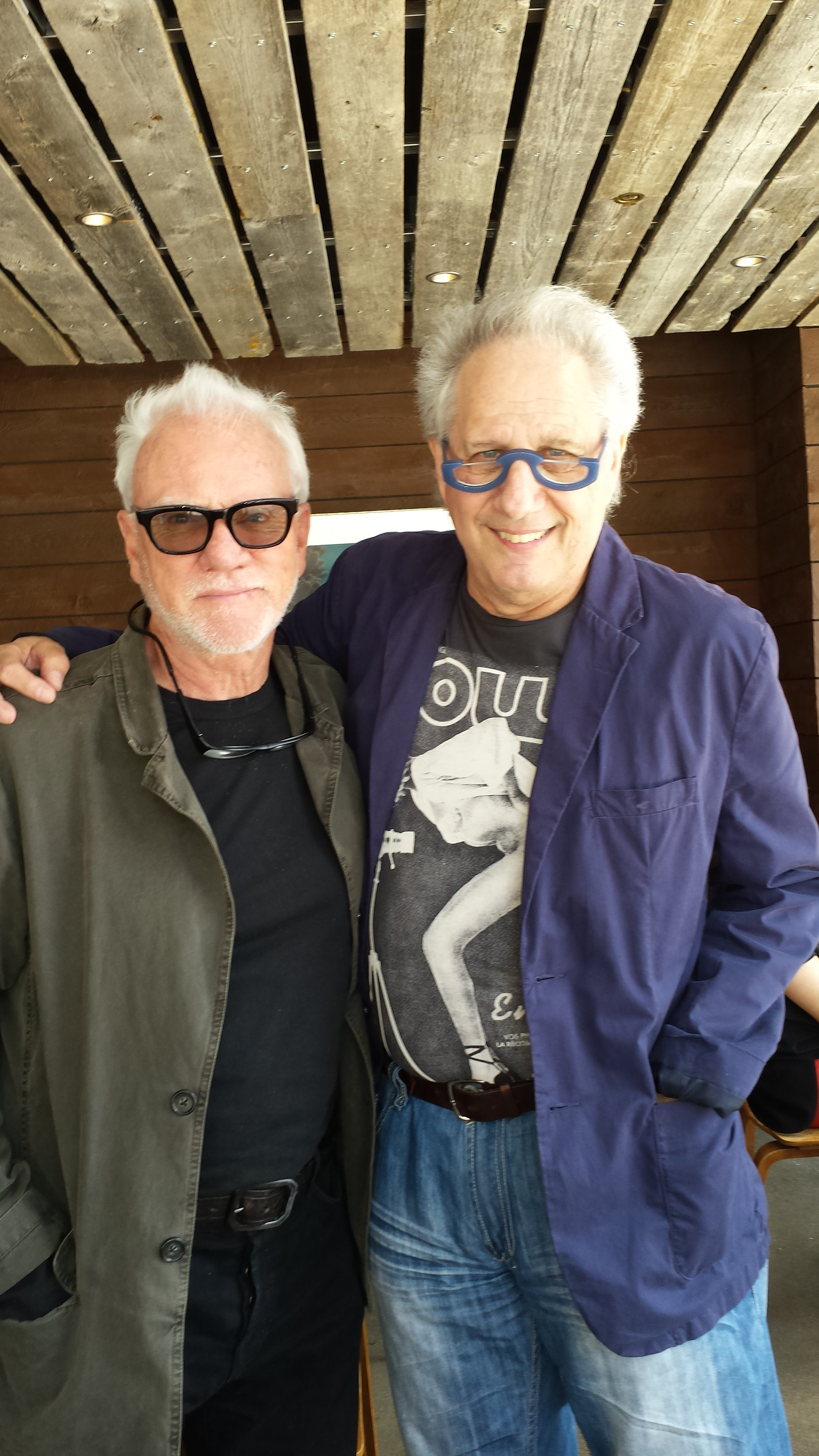
Mark Axelrod and Malcolm McDowell

Axelrod has written the novels Capital Castles (Pacific Writers Press, 2000), Cloud Castles (Pacific Writers Press, 1998), Cardboard Castles (Pacific Writers Press, 1996), Bombay California (Pacific Writers Press, 1994), The Posthumous Memoirs of Blase Kubash and most recently, The Mad Diary of Malcolm Malarkey (Dalkey Archive Press, TBA). He is working on volume II of the Malarkey trilogy, titled The Fall & Rise of Malcolm Malarkey, and volume III, titled Malarkey's Way; or, Life and Death in the Time of Covid. He has also written several collections of short stories, including Dante's Foil & Other Sporting Tales (Black Scat Press), and Secret Histories: Borges' Travel, Hemingway’s Garage (Fiction Collective 2, 2005), which was published in fall 2009 in Spanish by Thule Ediciones, Barcelona, as Viajes Borges, Talleres Hemingway. Balzac's Coffee, DaVinci's Ristorante (Verbivoracious Press, 2018) and Beckett's Restaurant, Pushkin's Vodka (2020). His translation of Balzac's play Mercadet was reissued in 2016 as Waiting For Godeau by Black Scat Press, and his collection of plays was published by Black Scat in 2017. Most recent play is titled The Real Housewives of Scandinavia: Reunion (2021).

Of his fiction, Luisa Valenzuela said: "A different voice in North American Writing…a very special, poignant sense of humor." The itinerant scholar's voracious appetite to find meaning in life led him to travel the world early on, and this theme of the eternal wanderer is seen in his novel Bombay California. In his review of Bombay California; or, Hollywood Somewhere West of Vine, Giose Rimanelli wrote: "…in the grand tradition of such Latin American fabulists as Machado de Assis, Borges, Cortázar, and García Márquez, Axelrod manipulates the novel form to present not just a fin-de-siècle statement on the political and social fabric of the United States, but a satire on Hollywood films, American television, American folklore, American advertising, American education, the United States presidency, Ronald Reagan, publishing prejudices, 'literary' agent incompetence, plus a panoply of gibes, jabs, and gestures at American culture in general. Chapter 33, for example, titled 'An Agent's Tools,' is nothing other than an order slip one might get at any fast-food restaurant. Chapter 49, titled 'Wanted Dead or Alive,' is a 'wanted' poster of someone who looks a lot like Ronald Reagan for, among other things, stealing a script that Katz had written about the presidency."

== Screenwriting awards ==
He has received numerous awards for his creative work, including two United Kingdom Leverhulme Fellowships for Creative Writing and two from the Camargo Foundation, Cassis, France. He has won no fewer than 20 screenwriting awards from the Irvine International Film Festival, the Chicago International Film Festival, and the Illinois International Film Festival. His latest awards are from the Kyiv International Screenwriters Festival, the Near Nazareth Film Festival, the Scario International Short Film Festival, and the Stockholm Film & Television Festival.^{[3]} He recently received awards from the Irvine International Film Festival, the Chicago International Film Festival and the Illinois International Film Festival for his screenplays.

- 1984: Sundance Institute Fellowship for Screenwriting, Finalist, Burbank, CA
- 1986: Sundance Institute Fellowship for Screenwriting, Finalist, Burbank, CA
- 1987: Writers Guild of America-East, Fellowship in Screenwriting, Finalist, New York, NY
- 1988: Academy of Motion Picture Arts & Sciences, Nicholl Fellowship in Screenwriting, Finalist, Los Angeles, CA
- 1989: Academy of Motion Picture Arts & Sciences, Nicholl Fellowship in Screenwriting, Finalist, Los Angeles, CA
- 1990: Festival Internacional de Video do Algarve, Nova 90, Bronze Award for Screenwriting, Algarve, Portugal
- 1990: University of Wisconsin Screenwriters Forum, National Teleplay Award, Madison, WI
- 1991: London International Film & Video Festival, Silver Seal Award for Screenwriting, London, England
- 1992: Writers Guild of America-East, Fellowship in Screenwriting, New York, NY
- 1993: Scottish Association of Filmmakers, Award in Screenwriting, Edinburgh, Scotland
- 2014: Chicago International Film Festival, Chicago, Finalist, Best Feature Screenplay, Chicago Bares.
- 2014: Firereel Film Festival, Redding, CA, Finalist, Best Short Screenplay, The Villiers Chalice.
- 2014: Illinois International Film Festival, Chicago, Best Feature Screenplay, Chicago Bares.
- 2014: Irvine International Film Festival, Shortlisted for Best Feature Screenplay, Stayin' Alive.
- 2014: Oregon International Film Festival, Portland, 3rd Place Best Feature Film Screenplay, Of Gold & Ashes.
- 2014: Williamsburg International Film Festival, Chicago, Honorable Mention, Screenplay, Of Gold & Ashes.
- 2015: Amsterdam International Film Festival, The Netherlands, Finalist, Best Feature Film Screenplay, Of Gold and Ashes.
- 2015: Barcelona International Film Festival, Spain, Finalist, Best Feature Film Screenplay, Peru.
- 2015: Milan International Film Festival, Milan, Italy, Finalist, Best Unproduced Feature Film Screenplay, Of Gold and Ashes.
- 2015: River Bend Film Festival, South Bend, IN, Finalist, Best Feature Film Screenplay, Moonlight on the Wabash.

== Fellowships, grants and awards ==
- 2007: Fulbright Commission, Finalist, Fulbright Fellowship to Berlin
- 2010–2011: Fulbright Fellowship, University of São Paulo, Brazil
- 2013 & 2014: Fulbright Fellowship, University of Stockholm, Sweden

== Works ==
- Angelina’s Lips by Giuseppe Conte – edited, with Introduction. Toronto, Canada: Guernica Publishing (April 2011)
- Aspects of the Screenplay (screenwriting). Portsmouth, NH: Heinemann Publishing (2001).
- Balzac's Coffee, DaVinci's Ristorante, Verbivoracious Press (2017)
- Bombay California; or, Hollywood Somewhere West of Vine (novel). Tustin, CA: Pacific Writers Press, 1994.
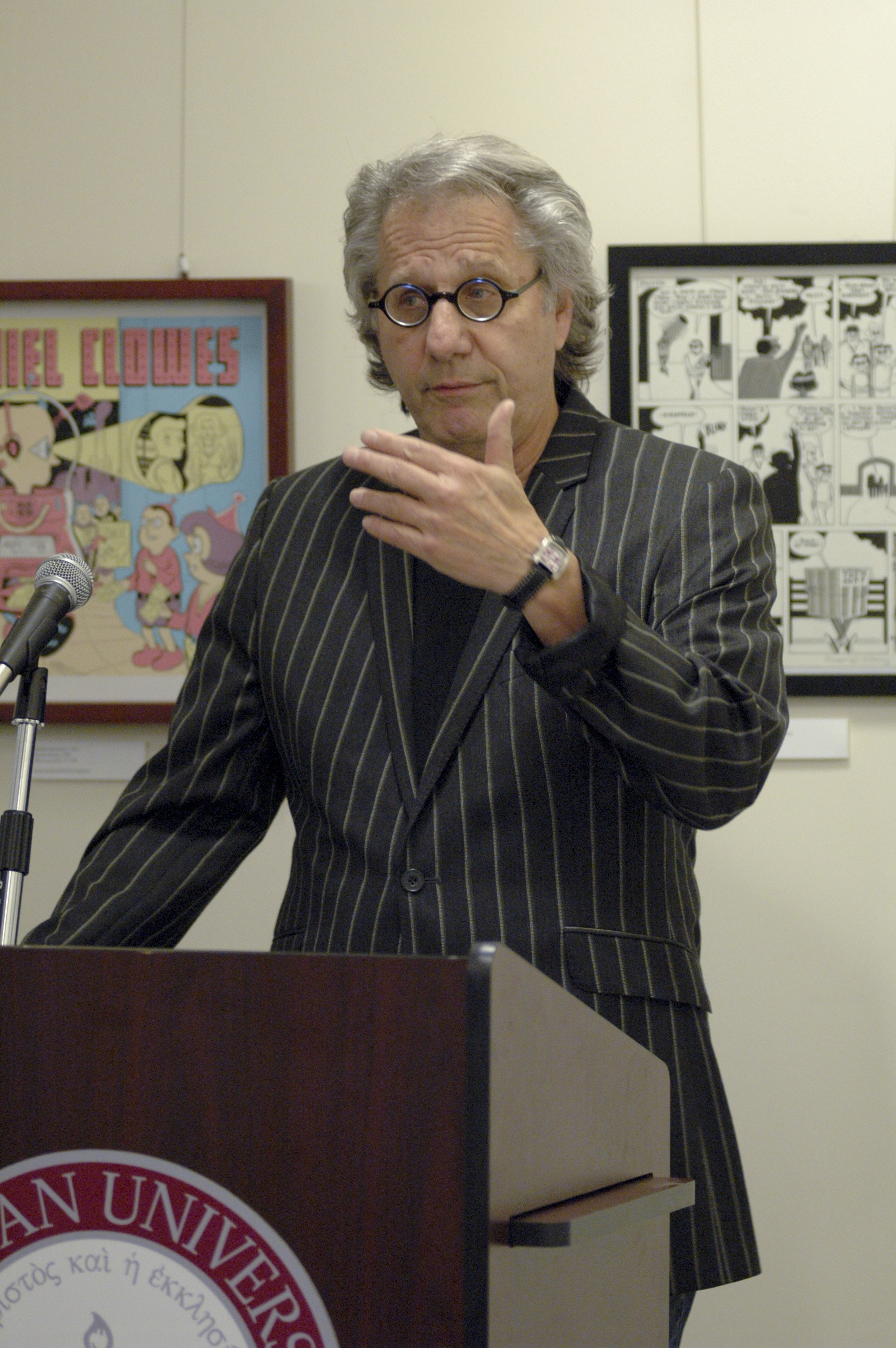
- Mark Axelrod at Chapman University
  Borges’ Travel, Hemingway's Garage (short stories), Normal, Illinois: Fiction Collective 2 (April 2004).
- Capital Castles (novel). Tustin, CA: Pacific Writers Press (2000).
- Cardboard Castles (novel). Tustin, CA: Pacific Writers Press, (1996).
- Character & Conflict: Cornerstones of Screenwriting (screenwriting) Portsmouth, NH: Heinemann Publishing (September, 2004).
- Cloud Castles (novel). Tustin, CA: Pacific Writers Press, (1999).
- Constructing Dialogue: From Citizen Kane to Midnight in Paris. New York: Bloomsbury Continuum Press (November 2013)
- Dante’s Foil & Other Sporting Tales, San Francisco: Black Scat Books (April 2015)
- Forms at War: FC2 1999–2009. Tuscaloosa, AL: Fiction Collective 2, 2009.
- I Read It At The Movies (screenwriting/adaptation) Portsmouth, NH: Heinemann Publishing (November 2006).
- Kissing Sonia Braga, Golden Hancuffs Review, Fall 2014; Vol. 1, No. 19
- Madness in Fiction: Literary Essays from Poe to Fowles, New York: Palgrave Macmillan (2018)
- Milan Panic: Big Thoughts Are Free, Authorized Biography, New York: Peter Lang Press (June 2015)
- Neville Chamberlain's Chimera or Nine Metaphors of Vision (visual prose). Milwaukee, WI: Membrane Press, 1978.
- Next Thing: Art in the 21st Century—Ed. Pablo Baler, Farleigh Dickinson University, contributor (2013)
- No Symbols Where None Intended: Literary Essays from Laclos to Beckett (literary essays), Palgrave Macmillan (2014).
- Notions of the Feminine: Literary Essays from Lawrence to Lacan, New York: Palgrave Macmillan (January 2015)
- Poetics of Prose: Literary Essays from Lermontov to Calvino, New York: Palgrave Macmillan (2016)
- The Poetics of Novels: Fiction & Its Execution (literary criticism). Basingstoke, UK: Macmillan Press, November, 1999.
- The Politics of Style In the Fiction of Balzac, Beckett & Cortázar (criticism). New York: St. Martin's Press, 1992.
- Viajes Borges, Talleres Hemingway (short stories), Barcelona, Spain: Editorial Thule (October 2009).
- Waiting for Godeau (translation of the Balzac play Mercadet, The Good Businessman), San Francisco: Black Scat Books (October, 2013)

=== Film ===
- “Malarkey” Original Screenplay optioned, Bridge Media Partners, Los Angeles.
- “Stayin Alive” Original Screenplay, Cuckoo Clock Productions, Hamburg, Germany
- Fool's Sanctuary. Adaptation of the novel by Jennifer Johnston, Kettledrum Productions, Los Angeles
