= Andrew Carroll =

American dramatist (born 1969)

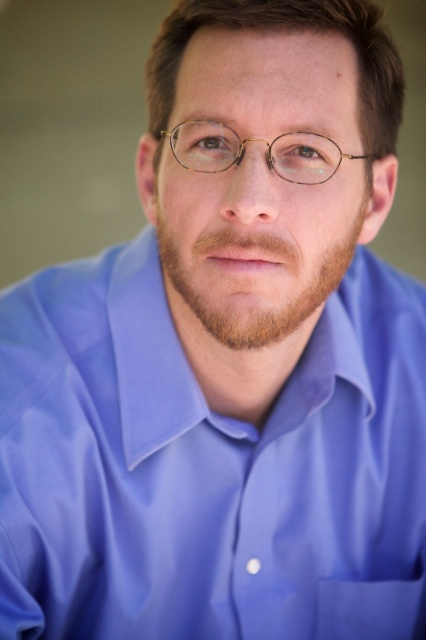
- Born: September 27, 1969 (age 56); Washington, D.C., U.S.
- Education: Columbia University
- Writing career
- Period: 1991–present
- Subjects: History; Military history
- Notable works: Letters of a Nation; War Letters; Behind the Lines

Andrew Carroll (born September 27, 1969) is an American author, editor, playwright, public speaker, nonprofit executive, and historian.

Carroll is known as the editor of the New York Times best sellers Letters of a Nation, Behind the Lines, and War Letters, which later inspired the documentary of the same name. He is also known for seeking out and preserving war-related correspondences, distributing millions of free books to the general public throughout the United States and to U.S. troops abroad, and finding and bringing attention to unmarked but historically significant sites across America.

== Early life ==
Carroll was adopted as an infant in Washington, D.C., and raised by Marea and Thomas Edmund Carroll, who helped establish the Environmental Protection Agency in 1970. Carroll attended Sidwell Friends High School and graduated magna cum laude from Columbia University in 1993, receiving his bachelor's degree in English literature. His older brother and only sibling, Christopher Carroll, is a professional photographer and filmmaker who was once a photo editor for the music magazine Spin. Christopher Carroll is also the co-editor with his wife, Liz Mechem, of the book Legends of Country.

In 1991, during his sophomore year at Columbia, Andrew Carroll wrote his first book, Volunteer USA: A Comprehensive Guide to Worthy Causes That Need You. Carroll followed it up in 1994 with Golden Opportunities: A Volunteer Guide for Americans Over 50.

== The American Poetry & Literacy (APL) Project ==
In 1991, during his junior year at Columbia, Carroll was inspired by a lecture given at the Library of Congress by Joseph Brodsky, the Nobel Prize-winning author and Poet Laureate of the United States. Brodsky recommended that free poetry books should be widely disseminated to the American public. Carroll wrote to Brodsky offering to help start the initiative, and, after meeting in 1992, they launched what Carroll named: the American Poetry & Literacy (APL) Project, a nonprofit organization that would distribute free poetry books to the general public.

Carroll persuaded the Book-of-the-Month Club to donate to the APL Project thousands of copies of the book, Six American Poets: An Anthology, edited by Joel Conarroe, which features poems by Robert Frost, Emily Dickinson, Langston Hughes, Wallace Stevens, Walt Whitman, and William Carlos Williams. DoubleTree was the first hotel chain to agree to place the books in its rooms.

The APL Project expanded into giving away free books in schools, supermarkets, homeless shelters, senior centers, jury waiting rooms, and similar public venues. Carroll began working with Dover Publications, buying up large quantities of their inexpensive "thrift editions" and distributing specific books at certain times of the year (e.g., Great Love Poems for Valentines Day, funded by Lancôme, and The Raven and Other Favorite Poems by Edgar Allan Poe for Halloween).

After Joseph Brodsky died from a heart attack at the age of 55, Carroll went on a nationwide tour in Brodsky's honor and drove across the country and gave away 100,000 free books. The trip, which Carroll called The Great APLseed Giveaway began in April (National Poetry Month) 1998 and lasted for five weeks. The trip was sponsored by the Academy of American Poets and the Washington Apple Commission, and it was inspired by Johnny Appleseed's travels throughout the United States. DoubleTree Hotels provided Carroll with free lodging, and Ryder loaned Carroll a truck that he filled with books. Carroll drove from New York to California and handed out books at truck stops, hospitals, supermarkets, schools, bus and train stations, zoos, a White Castle hamburger restaurant in Chicago, and a casino and a 24-hour wedding chapel in Las Vegas. In 1998, Carroll convinced Amtrak to place thousands of copies of a poetry anthology, titled Songs for the Open Road: Poems of Travel and Adventure (Dover). In April 1999, Volkswagen agreed to put 40,000 poetry books provided by the APL Project in the glove compartment of its cars as they came off the assembly line. American Airlines placed 100,000 copies of Songs for the Open Road in the seat backs of their planes in April 2000. And the Target Corporation paid the APL Project for 300,000 books to give away to their customers. Before the 2002 Winter Olympics in Salt Lake City, the International Olympic Committee contacted Carroll and requested that he edit a special anthology of international verse that would be given to athletes and spectators. Carroll created the book A World of Poetry (Dover) which was distributed throughout Salt Lake City during the Olympics.

== The Legacy Project ==
While still involved with the poetry initiative, Carroll founded the Legacy Project, a national, all-volunteer effort that worked to honor and remember America's veterans and troops by seeking out and preserving their war-related correspondences. Carroll was inspired to create the Legacy Project after his family's home in Washington, D.C., burned down during his sophomore year of college and destroyed most of his and his family's personal memorabilia and correspondence.

In 1997, Carroll edited his first New York Times best seller, Letters of a Nation: A Collection of Extraordinary American Letters (with an introduction by Marian Wright Edelman), which features more than 200 letters written by famous and not-so-famous individuals from the past 350 years. Some of the letters, including one by a Navajo code talker, had never been published before.

In the summer of 1998, Carroll contacted Dear Abby, who frequently promoted causes that helped troops and veterans, and asked her to write a column requesting that people share with the Legacy Project any war-related letters they had written or had received from loved ones. Abby published the column on Veterans Day in 1998 and included a post office box that Carroll had set up for people to send in their war letters. Within a year, Carroll had received more than 15,000 letters, some of them dating as far back as the American Revolution. News about the Legacy Project caught the attention of former CBS News correspondent Harry Smith. Smith subsequently produced a documentary about war correspondence, Dear Home: Letters From World War II, which aired on the History Channel in 1999.

Director Steven Spielberg heard about Carroll's Legacy Project and asked him to find a World War II couple who would read some of their wartime love letters at a televised event, which was broadcast to millions, in front of the Lincoln Memorial on the National Mall in Washington, D.C., on December 31, 1999, as part of the nation's millennial celebrations.

== War Letters-related books, documentaries, and memorials ==
In 2001, Carroll edited the book War Letters: Extraordinary Correspondence from American Wars, based on the correspondence collected by the Legacy Project. Scribner's gave Carroll a $500,000 advance for the book (money Carroll donated to veterans' groups). The book became a New York Times best seller. All of the letters in the book were previously unpublished, including letters by William T. Sherman, Clara Barton, Helen Keller, George H. W. Bush (who wrote from a submarine that had rescued him after he'd been shot down and almost killed), H. Richard Hornberger (a Korean War surgeon who later wrote the book MASH), Colin Powell, and Julia Child, who, before she became "the French chef", served as a spy during World War II in the OSS (Office of Strategic Services, the precursor to the CIA).

The audio version of War Letters, which features famous journalists and actors (including Tom Brokaw, Rob Lowe, Noah Wyle, Joan Allen, David Strathairn, Julianna Margulies, Giovanni Ribisi, Campbell Scott, and Eric Stoltz), reading the letters, was nominated for a Grammy in the "Best Spoken Word" category in 2001. War Letters lost to Q: The Autobiography of Quincy Jones, read by Quincy Jones.

In 2001, War Letters inspired a one-hour documentary of the same name for PBS' American Experience series. Edward Norton, Joan Allen, Esai Morales, Bill Paxton, and David Hyde Pierce were among the actors who read letters for the film, which was directed by Robby Kenner.

Letters from Carroll's archive have been displayed in local and national museums throughout the United States, as well as on veterans' memorials, including in Silver Spring, Maryland, and Temecula, California.

From September 2003 through March 2004, Carroll traveled to almost 40 countries around the world, including Iraq and Afghanistan, to meet with U.S. troops and to seek out more letters and emails. This journey inspired Carroll's third New York Times best seller, Behind the Lines: Powerful and Revealing American and Foreign War Letters—and One Man's Search to Find Them, in 2005.

Two years later, Carroll edited Grace Under Fire: Letters of Faith in Times of War, which focuses on the role of religion and spiritual beliefs in wartime.

Several of Carroll's books have been translated into other languages, including Behind the Lines, which was published in Brazil as Cartos do Front: Relatos emocionantes da vida na Guerra.

Since 2001, Carroll has also organized events that feature famous Americans reading war letters. Presenters have included senators, generals, actors, the Chief Justice of the Supreme Court, journalists, and the relatives of service members killed in action. At a May 2005 reading in New York to celebrate the publication of Behind the Lines, the author Kurt Vonnegut read a letter he had written in 1945 after surviving the firebombing of Dresden and which was published for the first time in Carroll's book.

== Reviving the Armed Services Editions ==
In 2000, Carroll approached book publishers and encouraged them to revive the Armed Services Editions (ASEs), which were paperback books formatted to fit into a cargo pocket and distributed specifically to American troops during World War II. (Beginning in 1942, the U.S. military partnered with publishers to disseminate more than 120 million ASEs. This giveaway represented the largest free distribution of fiction and non-fiction books in the history of the world. More than 1,300 titles were published, including mysteries, biographies, crime stories, adventure novels, and classic works of literature by authors such as Ernest Hemingway, John Steinbeck, and Herman Melville. The original ASEs were discontinued in 1947.)

In 2000, Carroll began working with major publishers to bring back the ASEs. Hyperion, Simon & Schuster, Random House, Oxford University Press, and Dover Publications were among the first to join to publish and give away free ASEs to troops overseas and serving on U.S. warships. More than two million copies of the following titles were distributed: Medal of Honor: Profiles of America's Military Heroes from the Civil War to the Present, by Allen Mikaelian, with commentary by Mike Wallace (Hyperion); Henry V, by William Shakespeare (Dover); The Art of War, by Sun Tzu (Dover); Wry Martinis, by Christopher Buckley (Random House); and One Thousand and One Nights, translated by Geraldine McCaughrean (Oxford University Press). The books were formatted in the same "cargo pocket" size and have the same vintage appearance as the original ASEs from World War II. Unlike the original ASEs, the new books were paid for entirely with private donations. No government funding was used.

== "Operation Homecoming" program, related book, and documentary ==
In 2004, the chairman of the National Endowment for the Arts (NEA), Dana Gioia, and the poet Marilyn Nelson (the daughter of a Tuskegee Airman), conceived an idea to encourage military personnel and their loved ones to write about their wartime experiences in Iraq and Afghanistan. With funding from the Boeing Company, the NEA launched "Operation Homecoming" and encouraged active duty service members, veterans, and their families to share their letters, emails, short stories, poems, and any other writings to the NEA. The NEA also held writing workshops on military bases across the country, led by best selling authors like Tom Clancy, Mark Bowden, Jeff Shaara, and Bobbie Ann Mason. The NEA received an estimated 10,000 pages of material, and the agency asked Carroll to edit the material into an anthology. Carroll agreed and edited the book, Operation Homecoming: Iraq, Afghanistan, and the Home Front, in the Words of U.S. Troops and Their Families, on a pro bono basis.

Carroll led regular writing workshops for troops and veterans on military bases and at VA hospitals, the Walter Reed Army Medical Center, and the Bagram Air Force Base in Afghanistan. Carroll also wrote, A Guide for Writers, a free, 43-page booklet published by the NEA that was created to help other workshop leaders and potential authors, including active duty troops, veterans, and their loved ones, write about the military experience.

The program and book also inspired two films: One directed by Lawrence Bridges, titled Muse of Fire and features Kevin Costner and people involved in the program, either reading their written works or talking about the program's mission, and a second documentary, Operation Homecoming, directed by Richard Robbins, which was broadcast on PBS and also shown in movie theaters nationwide. Robbins' film included re-enactments of the written material along with voiceovers by prominent actors, including Robert Duvall, Aaron Echkhart, Blair Underwood, and John Krasinski. Robbins' documentary was nominated for an Oscar and won an Emmy.

== "Here Is Where" project and book ==
In June 2009, Carroll launched the "Here Is Where" campaign, an all-volunteer effort to find and bring attention to unmarked historic locations throughout the United States. Carroll traveled to all 50 states to find these overlooked sites, and he chronicled his journey in the book Here Is Where: Discovering America's Great Forgotten History. The sites are related to a broad range of subjects, including archaeology, art, Civil Rights, immigration, inventions, law, medical breakthroughs and discoveries, the military, religion, and science, with a special emphasis on forgotten women and minorities. Carroll has also used funds from his Here Is Where book to pay for and put up plaques and signs at some of the unmarked places he found. These include:

- a marker placed inside the Washington Marriott Wardman Park hotel in Washington, D.C. to honor the poet Langston Hughes, who was working as a busboy at the hotel in 1925 when he was discovered by the famous poet Vachel Lindsay.
- an outdoor marker dedicated at the National Harmony Memorial Park in Hyattsville, Maryland, in honor of the slave Philip Reed (also spelled Reid), who built the Statue of Freedom on top of the Capitol Building. Reed had been buried in an unmarked grave, and with the help of the genealogist Megan Smolenyak and her sister, Stacy, Carroll was able to locate the spot where Reed is actually believed to have been buried.
- an outdoor state marker erected along the banks of the Mississippi River in Memphis, Tennessee, in memory of the passengers of the steamboat Sultana, who died in April 1865 when the boilers exploded and the boat burned and sank. The loss of the Sultana remains the greatest maritime disaster in U.S. history. Carroll funded the sign with the assistance of the local historian Jerry Potter.
- a marker placed inside the Menger Hotel in San Antonio, Texas, in honor of Adina De Zavala, a Latina preservationist who helped save the Alamo from being torn down by hotel developers. In February 1908, she barricaded herself inside the Long Barrack Fortress part of the Alamo for several days, without food or water. Her actions generated national attention, and the Alamo was preserved.
- a marker placed inside a Baltimore, MD, Rite Aid store in honor of Mary K. Goddard, the publisher who risked her life during the American Revolution to print the first version of the Declaration of Independence (in January 1777) with the names of the signers on it. The store is located at 125 East Baltimore St., where Goddard's printing shop used to be.
- a marker placed inside the New York Hilton Midtown hotel in Manhattan in honor of Martin Cooper, the "father of the cell phone". Cooper was the main inventor of the first handheld cellular phone, and he made the first cell phone call in history on April 3, 1973, just outside of the Hilton on 6th Avenue, and then went into the Hilton to give a press conference about his invention.

== If All the Sky Were Paper play ==
In November 2004, Carroll wrote an article for National Geographic magazine about his trip to almost 40 countries around the world. The article was read by a theatre professor named John Benitz at Chapman University, who contacted Carroll and suggested that Carroll's travels, along with excerpts from the letters he found, could be the basis of a play. Carroll agreed and sent Benitz a script, which Benitz workshopped with his students. Carroll picked the title, If All the Sky Were Paper, based on a sentence from a letter written by a 14-year-old Polish boy interned in a Nazi concentration camp during World War II. The play has been performed nationwide, including at the Kirk Douglas Theatre and the Kennedy Center in Washington, D.C.

If All the Sky Were Paper has starred Oscar and Emmy-winning actors and other notable performers, among them: Laura Dern, Common, Mary Steenburgen, Ed Asner, Brad Hall, Gary Cole, Annette Bening, Jason Hall, and Michael Conner Humphreys, who played a young Forrest Gump in the 1994 film Forrest Gump and then went on to join the Army in 2004.

== The Center for American War Letters at Chapman University ==
In 2013, Carroll donated his entire collection of approximately 100,000 war letters to Chapman University. Carroll and Chapman changed the name of the initiative from "The Legacy Project" to "The Center for American War Letters". The university agreed to staff the center, archive and catalog the letters and emails, and ensure that they will be saved in perpetuity. The correspondences are preserved in the Center for American War Letters Archive in the Leatherby Libraries. Carroll is the center's founding director.

== My Fellow Soldiers book ==
In April 2017, to commemorate the 100th anniversary of the United States of America's official entry into World War I, Carroll published My Fellow Soldiers: General John Pershing and the Americans Who Helped Win the Great War. The book includes previously unpublished letters by Pershing, including several that relate to the fire that killed Pershing's wife and three young daughters at the Presidio, while Pershing was stationed at Fort Bliss in El Paso, Texas. Also in April 2017, PBS aired a three-part documentary on World War I, titled The Great War, and Carroll was featured in the film talking about General Pershing and other aspects of the war.

== Smithsonian exhibits ==
In 2005, Carroll worked with the National Postal Museum to create an exhibit titled War Letters: Lost & Found, which opened on November 11, 2005, and featured letters written in times of war that were lost or discarded by the recipients and then found by total strangers years and even decades later. Original letters from the Civil War, World War I, World War II, Korea, and Vietnam were all displayed. The letters were discovered in old barns, homes being rebuilt for new tenants, garbage bins, as well as at flea markets and estate sales.

To commemorate the 100th anniversary of America's entry into the First World War, Carroll also helped to curate, with the Smithsonian's National Postal Museum, an exhibit that opened in April 2017 and was titled My Fellow Soldiers. The exhibit included letters written by service members and their loved ones before, during, and after World War I. Original letters by Pershing were also featured.

== Awards and honors ==
Carroll has received, among other accolades: the Daughters of the American Revolution's Medal of Honor award; the Order of Saint Maurice, bestowed by the National Infantryman's Association; the Young Alumni Achievement Award, presented by Carroll's alma mater, Columbia University; the IONA Senior Service's President's Award; and the National Endowment for the Arts' Chairman's Medal, the highest award given by the NEA chairman. Several mayors and city councils have also proclaimed "Andrew Carroll Day" in their respective cities.

== Published works ==
- Letters of a Nation: A Collection of Extraordinary American Letters. New York: Kodansha International. 1997. ISBN 1-56836-196-3.
- War Letters: Extraordinary Correspondence from American Wars. New York: Scribner. 2001. OCLC 46402061.
- Here Is Where: Discovering America's Great Forgotten History. New York: Crown Archetype. 2013. ISBN 978-0-307-46397-5.
- Behind the Lines: Powerful and Revealing American and Foreign War Letters – and one Man's Search to Find Them. New York: Scribner. 2005. ISBN 0-7432-5616-6. OCLC 58648073.
- Operation Homecoming: Iraq, Afghanistan, and the Home Front, in the words of U.S. troops and their families. New York: Random House. 2006. OCLC 70114649.
- My Fellow Soldiers: General John Pershing and the Americans Who Helped Win the Great War. Penguin Press. 2017. ISBN 978-1594206481.
