= Maida Parlow French =

Canadian artist and writer

Maida Parlow French (1891–1977) was a Canadian author and artist. Her works include Boughs Bend Over (1943), All This to Keep (1947), and the autobiographical Apples Don't Just Grow (1954). In 1967 she wrote Kathleen Parlow: A Portrait, a biography of her cousin, Kathleen Parlow.
