= Center for American War Letters =

Historical archives

- Formation: 2013
- Founder: Andrew Carroll
- Type: Research center / archival collection
- Purpose: Preservation and study of American war correspondence
- Headquarters: Leatherby Libraries, Chapman University
- Location: Orange, California, U.S.
- Coordinates: 33.7928°N 117.8512°W
- Parent organization: Chapman University

The Center for American War Letters is a center established in 2013 after historian Andrew Carroll donated more than 100,000 war letters to Chapman University.

== Background ==
The Center for American War Letters (CAWL) is housed in the Leatherby Libraries building at Chapman University in Orange, California. Every American conflict is represented in the collections at CAWL, including more than 40 linear feet of correspondence from World War II. Scholars and the public can visit the Center and browse its holdings by visiting the Center during business hours. There are also regular exhibits at CAWL featuring the letters and other war ephemera.

=== Collection ===
Notable holdings include a letter by a soldier writing on stationery discovered in Adolf Hitler's office and a Civil War letter from General William T. Sherman. The National Endowment for the Humanities (NEH) recently awarded a Foundations-level grant for the digitization of the letters held in this archive, so they may be available to researchers online. This award was made through the Standing Together Initiative sponsored by the NEH. Some parts of the holdings are already available in the Online Archive of California and in Chapman University's Digital Commons repository.

== Published works based on collection ==
- War letters: extraordinary correspondence from American wars. New York: Scribner. 2001. OCLC 46402061.
- Behind the lines: powerful and revealing American and foreign war letters--and one man's search to find them. New York: Scribner. 2005. ISBN 0-7432-5616-6. OCLC 58648073.
- Operation homecoming: Iraq, Afghanistan, and the Home Front, in the words of U.S. troops and their families. New York: Random House. 2006. OCLC 70114649.
- My Fellow Soldiers: General John Pershing and the Americans Who Helped Win the Great War. Penguin Press. 2017. ISBN 978-1594206481.
