= Prexy Nesbitt =

Rozell "Prexy" William Nesbitt (born 23 February 1944) is an American educator, activist, and speaker on Africa, foreign policy, and racism. He has also worked as a "red cap," social worker, union organizer, special assistant to Chicago’s Mayor, the late Harold Washington, and a senior program officer with the MacArthur Foundation in Chicago. As an anti-apartheid campaigner, he came to personally know Nelson Mandela.

Nesbitt taught at Columbia College Chicago for 33 years and is currently the Presidential Fellow in Peace Studies at the Chapman University and teaches in the Wilkinson College of Arts, Humanities, and Social Sciences.

Nesbitt was born on the West Side of Chicago to Rozell R. Nesbitt and Sadie Crain Nesbitt, and grew up in the Albany Park and Lawndale neighborhoods. His parents were schoolteachers and were politically active.

Nesbitt attended Francis W. Parker School. As a teen in the early 1960s, Nesbitt was the victim of police brutality and detained, though released, after intervening in an incident where he witnessed a woman being harassed by a police officer.

After high school, Nesbitt attended Antioch College in Ohio, graduating in 1967. While at Antioch, he was among a group of students who participated in local civil rights actions to desegregate the village of Yellow Springs including the occupation of Gegner Barbershop in 1964 during which Nesbitt was arrested. Nesbitt later went on to attend the University of Dar Es Salaam (Tanzania), Northwestern University, and Columbia University.

The Nesbitt family attended Warren Avenue Congregational Church where Martin Luther King Jr.'s Southern Christian Leadership Conference (SCLC) set up its Chicago headquarters. Nesbitt became involved with SCLC in the summer of 1966 at his mother's suggestion, and worked on Martin Luther King Jr.'s security detail during the 1966 Marquette Park March.
