= John Fowles Center for Creative Writing =

Center for creative writing at Chapman University

The John Fowles Center for Creative Writing was created by Mark Axelrod at Chapman University in order to encourage and advance the art and craft of writing including fiction, poetry, drama, creative non-fiction and film. The Center invites students and as well as those in the Orange County community to engage in the literary community at large. Writers from around the world discuss their work in a global and literary context, including subjects such as historical romances and human rights abuse. Each year the Center invites a distinguished group of national and international writers to share their work with the Chapman community, and the Southern California community at large. The center's namesake is taken from the British writer John Fowles.

== History ==
Created in 1996, The John Fowles Center for Creative Writing has invited to Chapman such accomplished and acclaimed writers as: Salman Rushdie, Luisa Valenzuela, Lawrence Ferlinghetti, Gioconda Belli, Alicia Partnoy, Raymond Federman, Steve Katz, Ronald Sukenick, Raúl Zurita, Elizabeth George, Ralph Berry, David Matlin, Charles Bernstein, Larry McCaffery, Alicia Kozameh, Fanny Howe, David Antin, and Willis Barnstone.

== Awards and grants ==
The John Fowles Center for Creative Writing has received five National Endowment for the Arts Grants, including one for the 2014–2015 academic year. In 2014, CBS Los Angeles named the center one of the best literary landmarks in Southern California.
