= Dimitar Ouzounov =

Bulgarian-American geophysicist

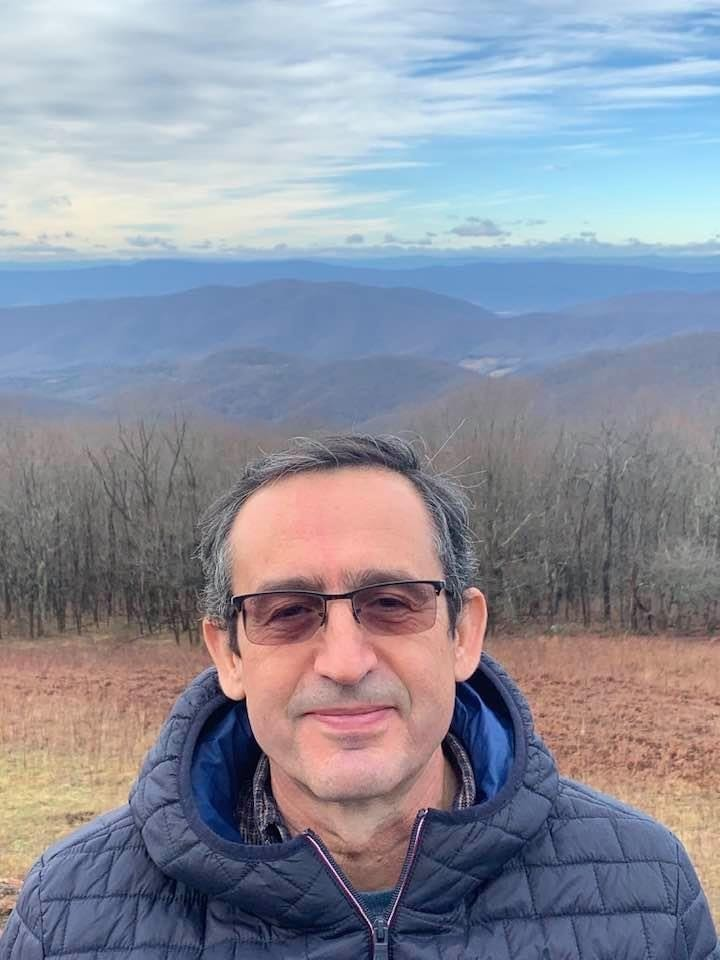
- Occupations: Geophysicist, research scientist, academic, and author

Academic background
- Education: MSc in Applied Geophysics; MSc study in Applied Mathematics & Informatics; PhD in Mathematics/Physics/Geophysics
- Alma mater: University of Mining and Geology; Technical University, Sofia; The Schmidt Institute of Physics of the Earth

Dimitar Ouzounov (Bulgarian: Димитър Узунов) is a Bulgarian–American geophysicist, research scientist, academic, and author. He is a research professor of geophysics at Institute for Earth, Computing, Human and Observing (Institute for ECHO), Chapman University.

Ouzounov has worked in cross-disciplinary problem-solving related to Earth system science, Geophysics, and Natural Hazards, with a focus on geohazards, earthquake science, geospace observations, and the interaction between geospheres. In particular, he has researched using near-space Earth observations to study geodynamic processes and contributed to the validation of a new geophysical theory related to earthquake processes. Using data from an electromagnetic environment survey of the Earth, he developed diagnostics of the atmospheric environment related to natural and man-made disasters as well. He has also co-authored three books, including The Possibility of Earthquake Forecasting: Learning from Nature, twelve book chapters as well as published 74 refereed journal paper. in addition to having three patents.

== Education ==
Ouzounov received his first Master of Science degree in Applied Geophysics from the University of Mining and Geology in Sofia, Bulgaria. He then pursued his second master's degree in Applied Mathematics and Informatics at the Technical University, Sofia. Later, he received his PhD in Mathematics/Physics/Geophysics from The Schmidt Institute of Physics of the Earth in Moscow, Russia.

== Career ==
Ouzounov began his academic career as a Post-Doc/Research Scientist at the Geophysical Institute of the Academy of Sciences in Sofia, Bulgaria. Later, he became an adjunct professor at George Mason University and subsequently, moved on to become an associate professor of geophysics in the Center of Excellence in Earth Systems Modeling & Observations (CEESMO) at Chapman University from 2009 to 2013. He held concurrent appointment as a guest professor at the Technical University of Catalonia and has been a research professor of geophysics at Institute for Earth, Computing, Human and Observing (Institute for ECHO), Chapman University since 2014.

Ouzounov was an SSAI Research Scientist at NASA Goddard Space Flight Centre in Greenbelt, Maryland, USA in 1999. As a NASA GES DISC center member, he provided the first data mission support for MODIS NASA Terra & Aqua satellites. He then received a NASA research grant and joined the Goddard SFC Geodynamics team, where he developed a technique for detecting transient thermal radiation related to geodynamics and pre-earthquake processes, studying electromagnetic signals from space concerning earthquakes and volcanoes and contributing to cross-sensor validation efforts. He has been a Keynote and Plenary Speaker at various international conferences, including NASA conferences (2011), EMSEV Taiwan (2022), TIEMS-Philippines (2018), SATELLITE-Houston (2015), Kansai Science Forum Osaka-Japan (2012), and the International School of Physics "Enrico Fermi" Italy (2012).

== Research ==
Ouzounov's research interests include earthquake hazards, early warnings, Earth radioactivity, geosphere interaction, geospace observations, geohazards, climate adaption, and interdisciplinary observations of Earth's Moon within the field of Earth system science. In geophysics, he is most known for his work on the Sensor-Web concept, which detects pre-earthquake processes, and his contributions to understanding lithosphere-atmosphere-ionosphere coupling (LAIC) processes linked to natural disaster events. In Earth system science, he developed a paradigm for satellite monitoring of TIR anomalies associated with radioactive pollution during the 2011 Fukushima nuclear disaster.

=== Geospace observation of natural hazards ===
One of Ouzounov's primary research interests in Earth science has been employing remote sensing techniques, such as satellite imagery and ground-based sensors, to study the geosphere interaction and geospace observations of natural hazards. In his 2018 interdisciplinary study conducted with a group of researchers, he integrated observations from both space and ground-based data sources to explore the interaction between Earth's geospheres and human health. He also examined the impact of major global geodynamic activities on atmospheric processes and climate by examining how they interact with the geosphere coupling channels, and directed his research efforts toward identifying the potential for geohazards and climate adaptation to interact through these processes. In 2022, he highlighted the value of geospace observations and cross-disciplinary studies in advancing the assessment of natural hazards and processes such as lithosphere-atmosphere-ionosphere coupling. Furthermore, having concentrated his research studies on Earth's moon interdisciplinary observations, he looked into the possible connection between transient lunar phenomena (TLP) and lunar tectonics, discovering proof of a causal relationship between major earthquakes and TLP events in specific lunar regions.

Ouzounov also applied interdisciplinary observations to investigate the physics of the pre-earthquake process and the underlying events that precede the release of energy. He developed methods based on Earth's electromagnetic field changes and used infrared and thermal imaging to monitor Geosphere Interaction Phenomena associated with the earthquake and volcanic activity and environmental disasters. Through his analysis of IR satellite data, he identified anomalous fluctuations preceding several medium to large earthquakes, detected short-lived anomalies in the Satellite thermal infrared (TIR) imaging data sets prior to major earthquakes, and noted the association of thermal radiation anomalies with earthquakes. He integrated a range of satellite and ground-based sensors to monitor geophysical anomalies preceding earthquakes with magnitudes greater than 5.5 globally. He also contributed in novel machine learning of the Satellite observations analysis that aids the investigation of physical and dynamic changes of seismic data in a collaborative study. In his book, Pre-Earthquake Processes: A Multidisciplinary Approach to Earthquake Prediction Studies, co-authored with Pulinets, Hattori and Taylor, he described pre-earthquake processes and physical signals, explored their relationship to seismic events, and applied data to short-term forecasting and prediction.

=== Earthquake precursors, processes, and predictions ===
Ouzounov worked on comprehending pre-earthquake processes and the interaction-lithosphere-atmosphere validating them, and exploring the possibilities of earthquake forecasting. He developed an approach to identifying short-term precursors of earthquakes, in collaboration with Sergey Pulinets, exploring a new perspective on the coupling of the lithosphere, atmosphere, and ionosphere preceding significant earthquakes been explored, and reviewed planned missions and satellite systems in his 2022 work, Earthquake Precursors in the Atmosphere and Ionosphere. The research focused on two fundamental mechanism concepts, namely, atmosphere ionization and the global electric circuit, and was supported with theoretical and experimental data. During a research study in Taiwan, Italy, Greece and Japan, he elucidated the possibility of observing radon activities with gamma rays as a potential precursor of an earthquake and noted the association of certain atmospheric signals, such as electron concentration in the ionosphere, ion rate activities, humidity, etc., with major earthquakes. Previously, in his book, The Possibility of Earthquake Forecasting Learning from Nature, he demonstrated that application of multi- sensor webs might lead to advanced earthquake early warnings.

== Bibliography ==
=== Books ===
- Pre‐Earthquake Processes: A Multidisciplinary Approach to Earthquake Prediction Studies (2018) ISBN 9781119156932
- The Possibility of Earthquake Forecasting: Learning from Nature (2018) ISBN 978075031248-6
- Earthquake Precursors in the Atmosphere and Ionosphere (2022) ISBN 9789402421705

=== Selected articles ===
- Ouzounov, D; Freund, F (January 2004). "Mid-infrared emission prior to strong earthquakes analyzed by remote sensing data". Advances in Space Research. 33 (3): 268–273. Bibcode:2004AdSpR..33..268O. doi:10.1016/S0273-1177(03)00486-1.
- Savtchenko, A; Ouzounov, D; Ahmad, S; Acker, J; Leptoukh, G; Koziana, J; Nickless, D (January 2004). "Terra and Aqua MODIS products available from NASA GES DAAC". Advances in Space Research. 34 (4): 710–714. Bibcode:2004AdSpR..34..710S. doi:10.1016/j.asr.2004.03.012.
- Pulinets, S.A.; Ouzounov, D.; Karelin, A.V.; Boyarchuk, K.A.; Pokhmelnykh, L.A. (January 2006). "The physical nature of thermal anomalies observed before strong earthquakes". Physics and Chemistry of the Earth, Parts A/B/C. 31 (4–9): 143–153. Bibcode:2006PCE....31..143P. doi:10.1016/j.pce.2006.02.042.
- Ouzounov, Dimitar; Liu, Defu; Chunli, Kang; Cervone, Guido; Kafatos, Menas; Taylor, Patrick (February 2007). "Outgoing long wave radiation variability from IR satellite data prior to major earthquakes". Tectonophysics. 431 (1–4): 211–220. Bibcode:2007Tectp.431..211O. doi:10.1016/j.tecto.2006.05.042.
- Pulinets, S.; Ouzounov, D. (June 2011). "Lithosphere–Atmosphere–Ionosphere Coupling (LAIC) model – An unified concept for earthquake precursors validation". Journal of Asian Earth Sciences. 41 (4–5): 371–382. Bibcode:2011JAESc..41..371P. doi:10.1016/j.jseaes.2010.03.005.
