= 12 (2003 film) =

- Directed by: Lawrence Bridges
- Written by: Lawrence Bridges
- Produced by: Lawrence Bridges
- Starring: Alison Elliott, Tony Griffin and Allen Lulu
- Edited by: Lawrence Bridges
- Release date: 2003
- Running time: 124 minutes

12 is a 2003 American independent feature film written, directed, edited and produced over the course of 10 years by filmmaker Lawrence Bridges.

== Synopsis ==
The film is a postmodern spoof that tells the story of Zeus' modern-day illegitimate children, Filmore and his half-sister Marie-Noel, who are forced to move from their ranch on the Channel Islands because their neighbors have grown suspicious of the fact they haven't aged for decades. Meanwhile, the U.S. government wants to turn their land into a national park. When the twelve Greek Gods return to Los Angeles for relaxation Zeus expects them to correctly identify the play fated and modeled around their current lives, Oscar Wilde's The Importance of Being Earnest, and perform the work flawlessly, in its entirety, for the Gods' entertainment. By such means, as the play's plot unfolds, the children are guaranteed new, credible lives. "Act or die," he commands. But if they fail to perform the play to its conclusion, or if they rebel, they will be killed by jealous Hera. The mere existence of these illegitimate children are an outrage to her, representing Zeus' countless infidelities.

12, whose title is often mistakenly derived from the number of years it took to create the film, is described by Variety as "equal parts L.A. love story, The Importance of Being Earnest, spoof on Greek gods and personal diary of actual events from 1988 to 1998."

== Cast ==
- Alison Elliott
- Tony Griffin
- Allen Lulu
- Brenda Varda
- Eugene Rubenzer
- Blake Robertson
- Golde Starger
- David Franko
- Eddie Zona
- Julienne Greer
- Mike Upton
- Lili Barsha
- Lisa Stark
- Mark Dalton
- Regina Leeds

== Production ==
Shot over the course of a decade, Bridges filmed 12 whenever the actors were available and "never imposed a deadline" on the project. Throughout the course of shooting, Bridges captured footage of natural disasters and major political events, including the 1994 Northridge earthquake, the Malibu fires, four lunar eclipses and two eclipses of the sun and the Rodney King riots, which were all included in the film. Bridges explained, "My camera was always loaded and the batteries charged and often it traveled with me in my car to and from work. When there was a disaster, I was always ready to document it."

While on a separate commercial shoot in Minneapolis, Allen Lulu suffered a heart attack. Golde Starger was diagnosed with cancer in the middle of the shoot, but recovered. "There were divorces and there were babies born. I guess when you look at all the things that could have gone wrong and didn't, I'm a very lucky man," Bridges told Indie Slate. Bridges adopted a flexible mentality in regards to continuity. Dramatic hair and weight changes were accounted for in the storyline.

The film was shot on 35mm Kodak short ends using Arri cameras and Zeiss Superspeed prime lenses. The production used minimal on-set lighting, mostly opting for available light. The camera dolly used throughout the production of the film was actually a homemade dolly that Bridges converted from a baby stroller. Bridges used more than 500,000 feet (150,000 m) of film.

=== Music ===
The film's soundtrack used a variety of classical music by Mozart, Beethoven, and Bach, among others. 12 is the first film for which the composer John Adams has allowed his music to be used.

== Themes ==
12 explores a variety of themes and attitudes that relate to a postmodern perspective on Greek mythology set within modern day Los Angeles. The idea of juxtaposition—Oscar Wilde / Greek mythology, mortals/immortals, grand scenery/run down Los Angeles streets is evidenced throughout. As Bridges himself states, "12 is a diary of L.A., a cinematic record of the natural and political convulsions gripping our town during the late-1980s and into the millennium."

Bridges explained his rationale in making 12 to Shoot saying, "Being the filmmaker, I clearly am defining myself as a radical independent. That's why I made the film. It's anti-everything in Hollywood. Not because of Hollywood – this is what I would do under any circumstance. I'm in love with the aesthetic, poetic and literary potential of film, and that's what I wanted to express."

== Distribution and publicity ==
12 was shown via guerrilla drive-ins, where the film was projected on the walls of buildings throughout Los Angeles. The film's audio was transmitted over pirated FM radio signals.

Bridges said he created the guerrilla drive-in in an effort to "paint the artwork back on the subject of its inception – projecting what you filmed back on to the wall at night." Although the film was an out of pocket expense for Bridges, he has said he is "waiting for the audience to find it, in terms of the marketplace," but also considers 12 to be public art that was privately funded.

In 2002, Bridges began a grassroots effort to be considered for Academy awards and passed out 12 T-shirts to members of the academy. However, police mistook him as a street vagrant and had him taken into custody. Coincidentally, the Los Angeles Times caught the incident on camera and published an image of Bridges being arrested wearing the '12 for Best Picture' shirt.

== Critical reception ==
Although it never saw commercial success, 12 was screened at more than 15 festivals worldwide, and was honored with a "Best of Fest" award at the Syracuse International Film and Video Festival in 2004.

LA Weekly film critic Paul Malcolm praised the filmmaker's inventive nature, writing, "Bridges, a director of television commercials, has a feel for transformative compositions that can remake even the most familiar environment -- a kitchen pantry, a corner on Wilshire Boulevard -- into a place of wonder."

Variety reviewer Robert Koehler applauded Bridges for his "dizzying, unforgettable adventure," writing, "Griffin and Elliott provide a good grounding for the viewer's attention as the deconstructed stream of images and story roll by, but much of the fascination here is not in the highly uneven perfs, but in pic's raw enthusiasm for the film medium, montage, the juxtaposition of image and sound and the reimagining of Greek classicism in a SoCal setting."

Tod Booth of the San Francisco Film Society called 12 "ambitious, discursive and hilarious" and described the film to be "as challenging and sweeping as a Pynchon novel-a Marx Brothers version of a Wagnerian opera, with Jean-Luc Godard mixed in."

In his monthly Media Matters column on Hollywood Network, Miles Beller wrote, "12 is by turns funny and infuriating, loony and inspire. Here is a movie that juggles actualities and artifice with manic glee. [...] [Bridges'] 12 is a daring, new vision of the human condition, a work of art that sublimely shows the folly and fulfillment of the ascent of man."
