= Chapman University =

Private university in Orange, California, US

Coordinates: 33°47′34″N 117°51′05″W

- Former names: Hesperian College (1861–1896); Pierce Christian College (1874–1896); Berkeley Bible Seminary (1896–1912); California Bible College (1912–1920); California School of Christianity (1920–1923); California Christian College (1918–1920, 1923–1934); Chapman College (1934–1991)
- Motto: ὀ Χριστòς καì ἡ Ἐκκλησíα (Greek)
- Motto in English: "Christ and Church"
- Type: Private research university
- Established: March 4, 1861; 165 years ago
- Accreditation: WSCUC
- Religious affiliation: Christian Church (Disciples of Christ); United Church of Christ
- Academic affiliations: AICCU; ICSC
- Endowment: $810.6 million (2024)
- President: Matthew J. Parlow
- Faculty: 1,117 total
- Administrative staff: 752 total
- Students: 10,001
- Undergraduates: 7,656
- Postgraduates: 2,345
- Location: Orange, California, United States
- Campus: 90 acres (36 ha); Midsize city
- Other campuses: Irvine
- Newspaper: The Panther
- Colors: Red and black
- Nickname: Panthers
- Sporting affiliations: NCAA Division III - SCIAC
- Mascot: Pete the Panther
- Website: www.chapman.edu

Chapman University is a private research university in Orange, California, United States. Encompassing eleven colleges, the university is classified among "R2: Doctoral Universities – High research activity". Chapman is a church-related university, maintaining affiliations with the Christian Church (Disciples of Christ) and the United Church of Christ.

== History ==
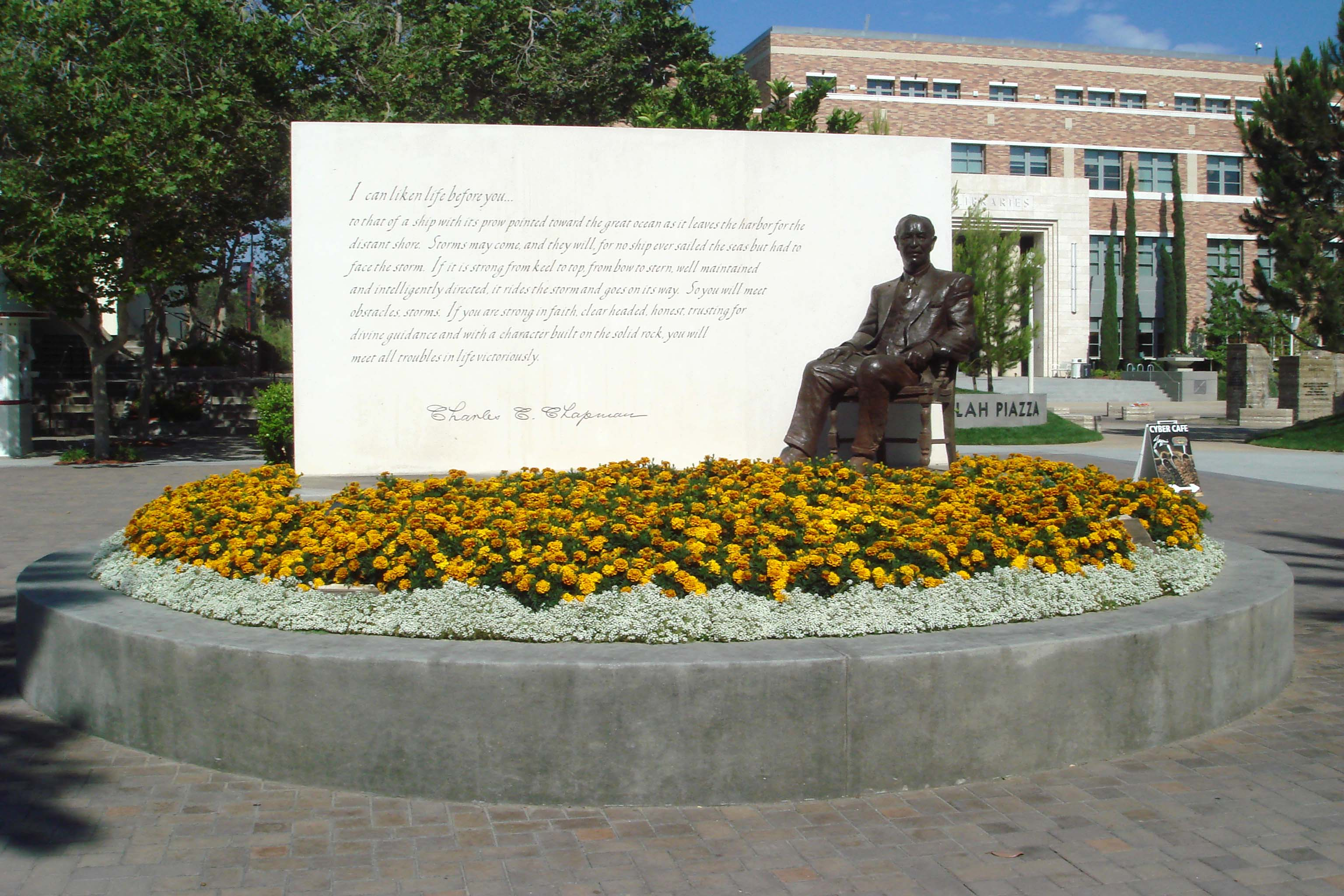
Sculpture by Raymond Persinger of Charles C. Chapman, founder of Chapman University

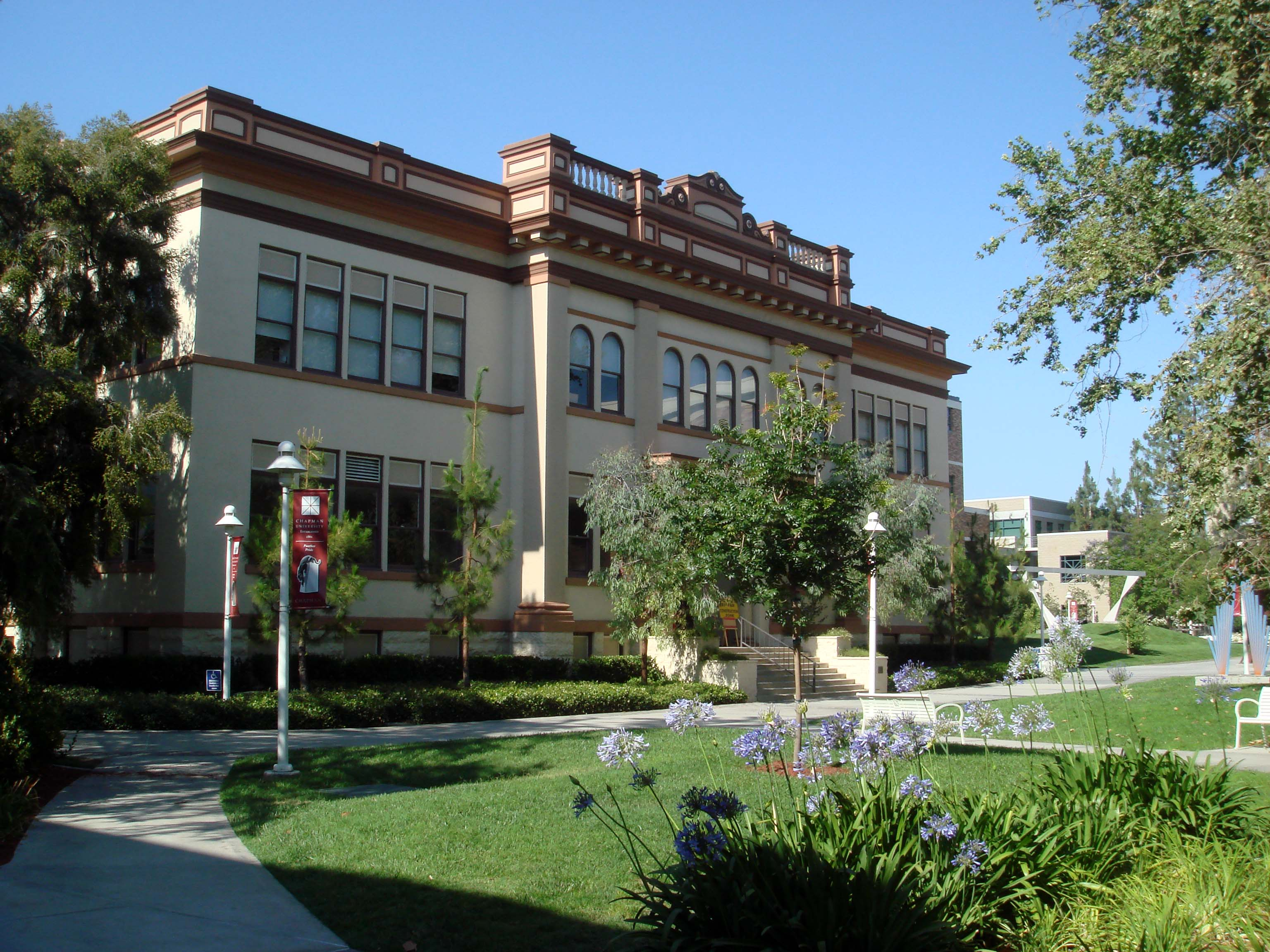
Wilkinson Hall

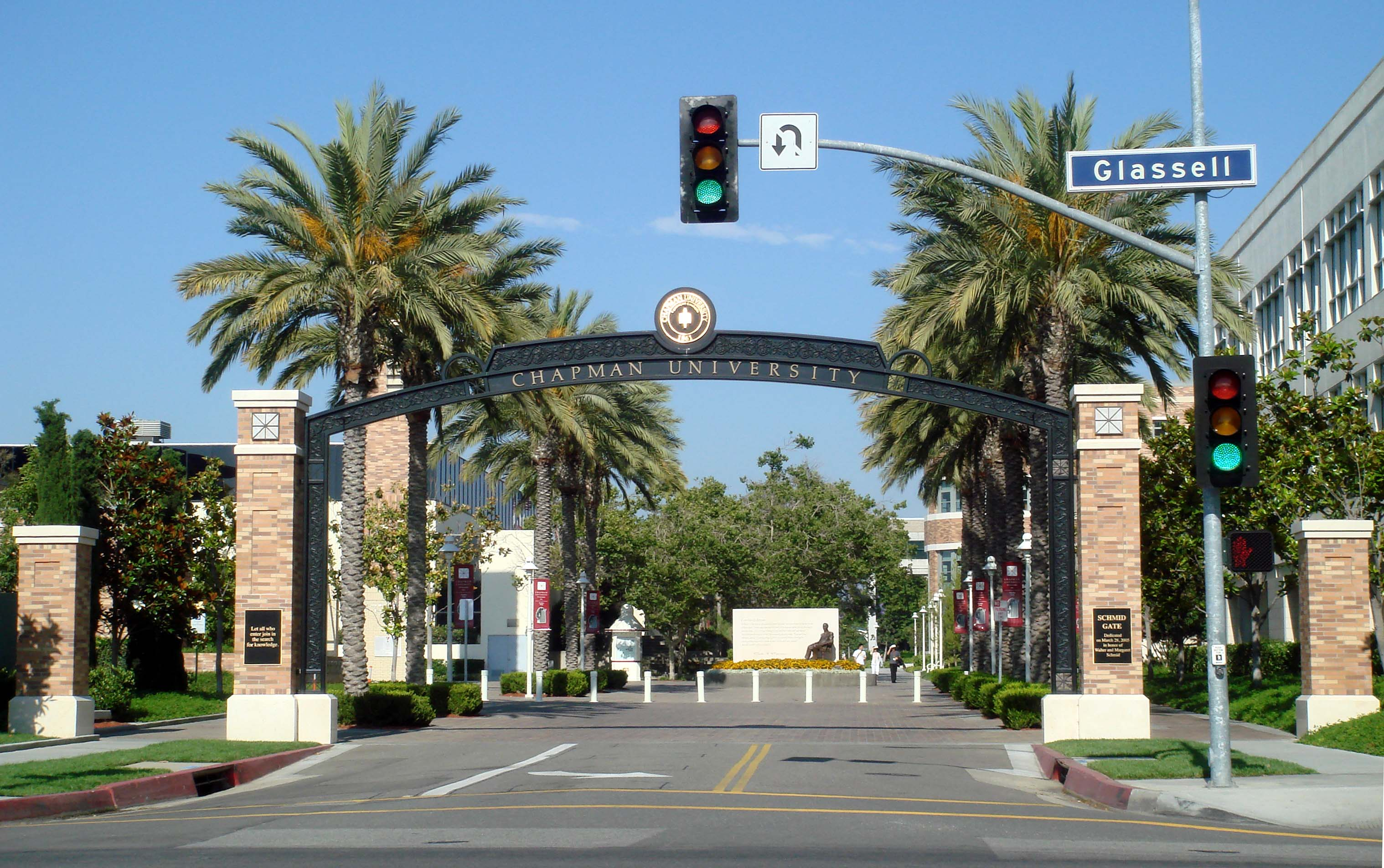
Schmid Gate, built in 2005

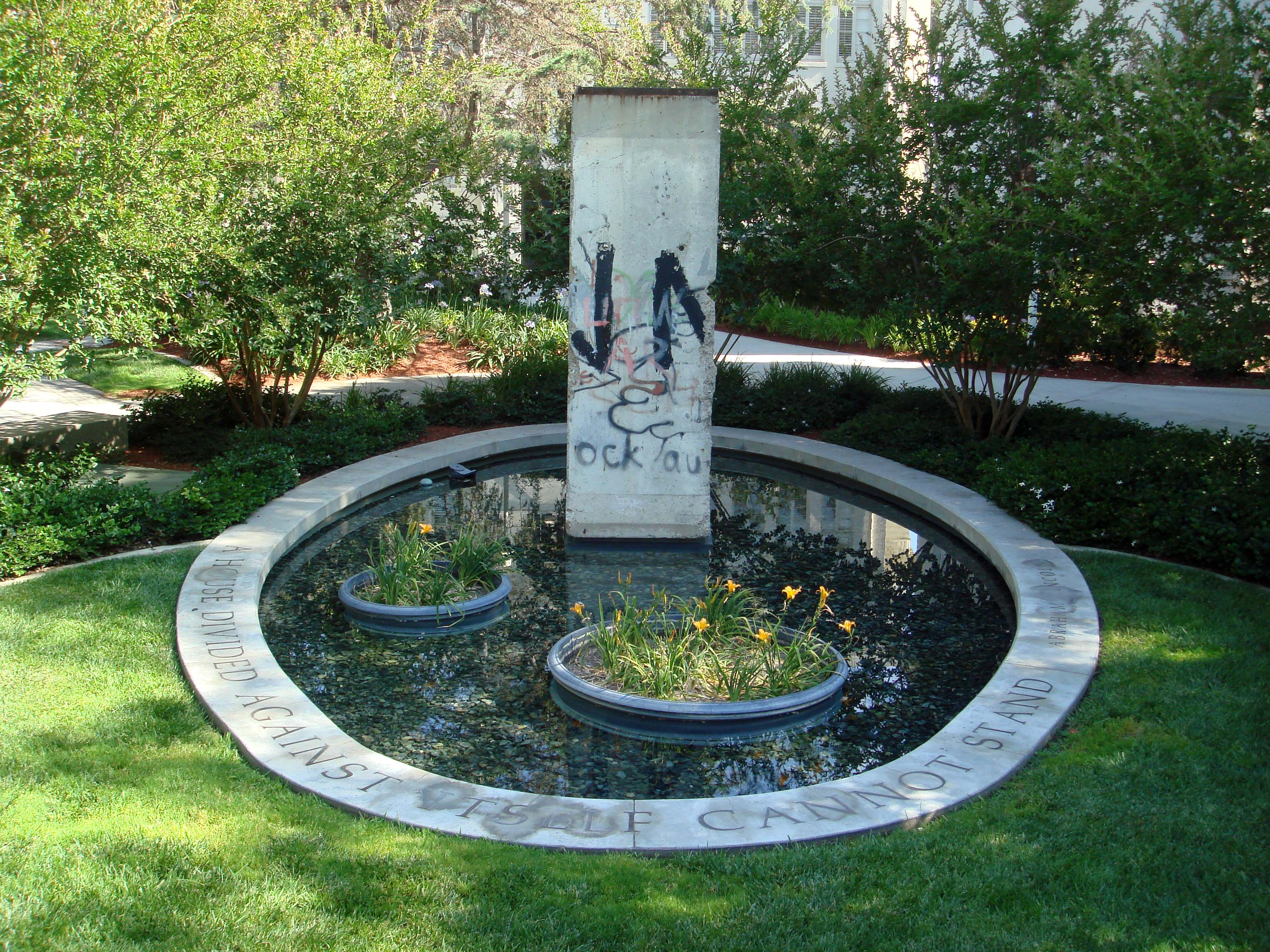
A section of the Berlin Wall in Liberty Plaza

Founded in Woodland, California, as Hesperian College, the school began classes on March 4, 1861. Its opening was timed to coincide with the hour of Abraham Lincoln's first inauguration. Hesperian admitted students regardless of sex or race. Throughout its first decades, the school was renamed and relocated several times. In 1896, Hesperian merged with Pierce Christian College to form the Berkeley Bible Seminary in Berkeley, California. The college was subsequently moved to San Francisco as the California Bible College. In 1920, the school was acquired by California Christian College, (Note: Not to be confused with California Christian College in Fresno, California) and moved to southern California, becoming the California School of Christianity, in Los Angeles. In 1923, the school was once again retitled the California Christian College.

In 1934, the school became Chapman College after the chairman of its board of trustees (and primary benefactor), C. C. Chapman. In 1954, Chapman University permanently relocated to its present campus in the city of Orange, the former site of Orange High School. Chapman established a Residence Education Center Program to serve military personnel in 1958, which evolved into Brandman University and later University of Massachusetts Global. The college became Chapman University in 1991. In the same year, James L. Doti became president of the school, the Department of Education became the School of Education (now known as the Donna Ford Attallah College of Educational Studies), and what is now known as the Wilkinson College of Arts, Humanities, and Social Sciences was established. The School of Film and Television, now the Dodge College of Film and Media Arts at Marion Knott Studios, opened in 1996.

Between 2000 and 2010, Chapman University expanded to include the Rodgers Center for Holocaust Education, Leatherby Libraries, Fish Interfaith Center, the Erin J. Anderson Athletics Complex, the Schmid College of Science and Technology, and the Argyros School's Economic Science Institute led by Vernon L. Smith. The Rinker Health Science Campus opened in Irvine, CA in 2013, becoming the home for the School of Pharmacy. Mathematician Daniele C. Struppa became President in 2016. In the same year, the Musco Center for the Arts opened. The 1,110-seat concert hall hosts performances.

The Keck Center for Science and Engineering opened in 2018, with the Dale E. and Sarah Ann Fowler School of Engineering opening shortly after. Between 2018 and 2022, Chapman University earned a Carnegie Classification of R2: Doctoral University – High Research Activity, had its first Rhodes Scholar, Vidal Arroyo '19, and became nationally ranked by U.S. News & World Report.

In 2019, President Daniele C. Struppa refused to take down two The Birth of a Nation posters at the Dodge College of Film and Media Arts. Struppa outlined his reasons in an opinion piece called, "Why I won't take down the original 'The Birth of a Nation' poster." Black students at Chapman voiced opposition to Struppa's decision; peaceful protests took place on campus. Faculty members took a survey on their stance to remove the posters, and the posters were eventually taken down.

Matt Parlow became Chapman’s 14th president in 2025.

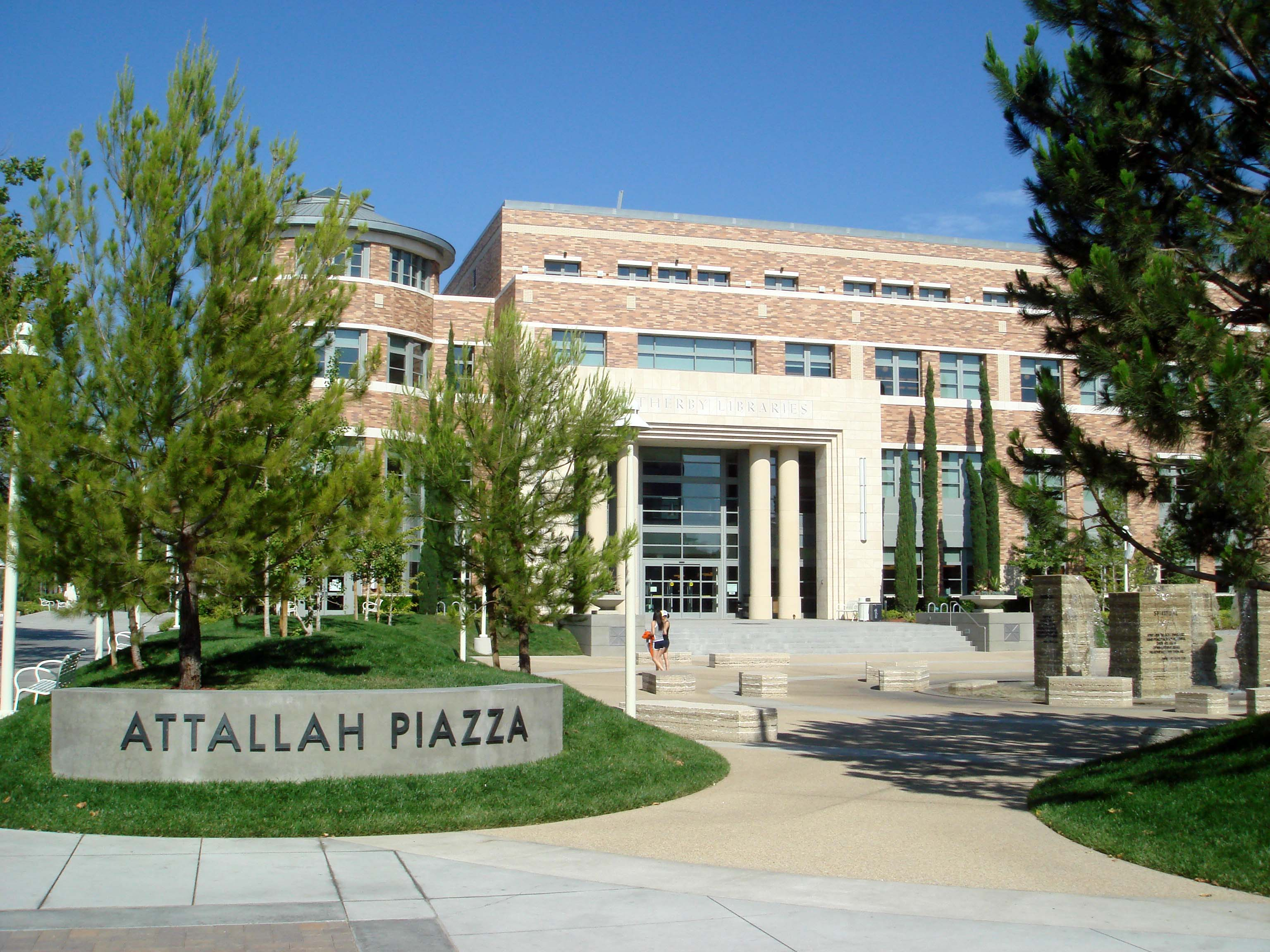
Attallah Piazza and Leatherby Libraries

== Academics ==
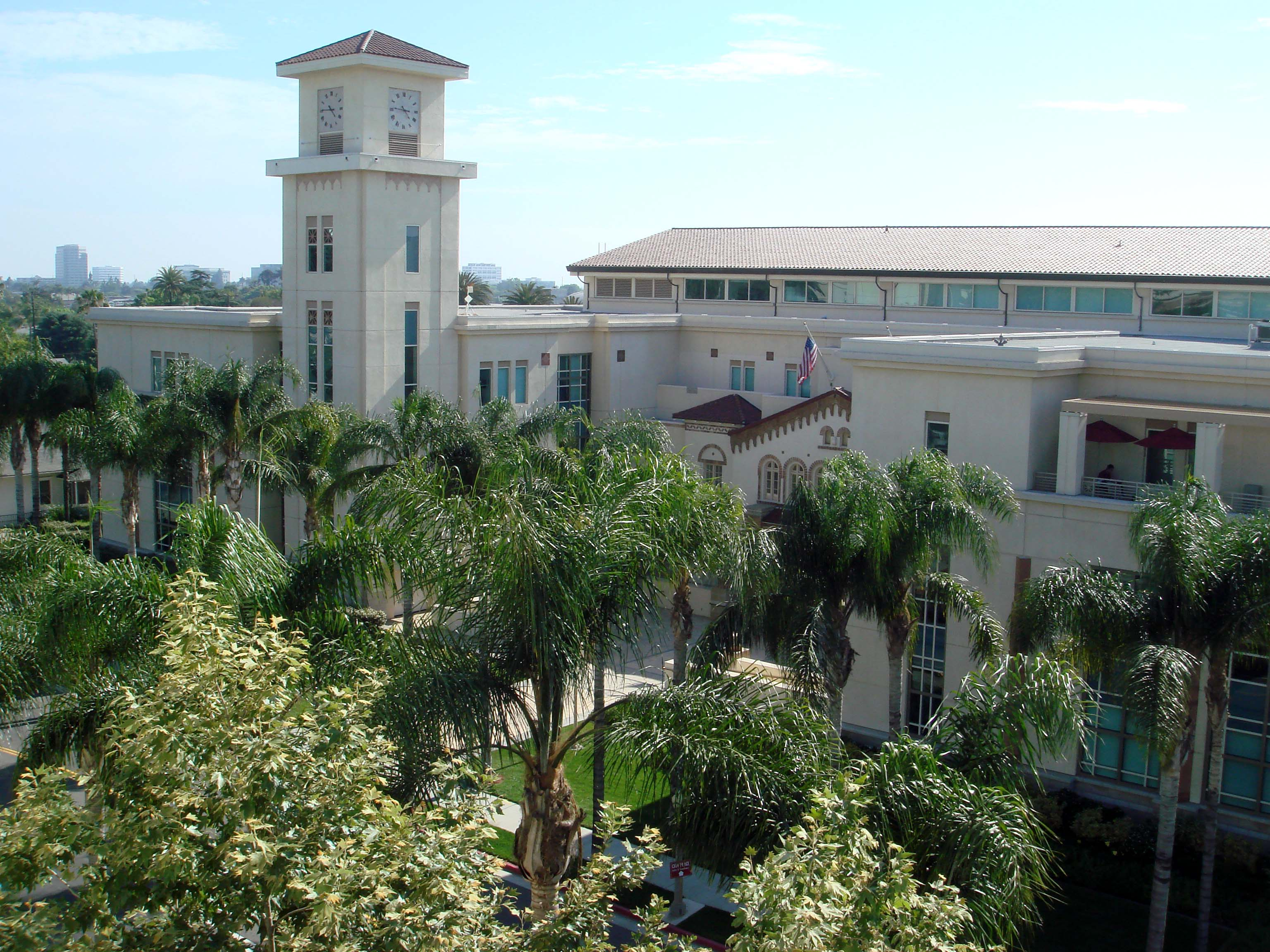
Donald P. Kennedy Hall, home of the Dale E. Fowler School of Law

=== Argyros College of Business and Economics ===
The George L. Argyros College of Business and Economics is located in the Arnold and Mabel Beckman Business and Technology Hall. The school was founded in 1977, and renamed in honor of former U.S. Ambassador to Spain, George L. Argyros, in 1999. A Chapman alumnus, Argyros chaired the university's board of trustees from 1976 to 2001, and has made significant donations toward increasing the business school's ranking and resources. In 2019, Argyros College commemorated the 20th anniversary of the school's renaming with a fundraiser dinner featuring President George W. Bush. The event raised approximately $15 million for the school's endowment, $10 million of which was a surprise announcement by the Argyros family. Argyros School became Argyros College in 2023, following another $10m gift from the family.

Argyros College offers undergraduate and graduate degrees in business, including the Master of Business Administration and Master of Science. The Argyros College of Business and Economics became nationally ranked as the 60th Best Undergraduate Bloomberg BusinessWeek Business School in 2014. In 2016, the Argyros College of Business and Economics rose to 34th. In 2023, Argyros was ranked the #60 business school in the country by U.S. News & World Report.

The Argyros College is home to several research centers and institutes, including the A. Gary Anderson Center for Economic Research, the C. Larry Hoag Center for Real Estate and Finance, the Ralph W. Leatherby Center for Entrepreneurship and Ethics, the Walter Schmid Center for International Business, the Economic Science Institute (founded by Nobel Prize winner Vernon L. Smith and others in 2008), the Institute for the Study of Religion, Economics and Society, and the Smith Institute for Political Economy and Philosophy. The Leatherby Center for Entrepreneurship and Business Ethics is a program whose scope includes original research, scholarship, and the publication of several scholarly journals.

=== Crean College of Health and Behavioral Sciences ===
Formally established as an independent unit in 2014, Crean College brings together disciplines in psychological and health sciences under one administrative structure. Crean offers undergraduate and graduate programs in health sciences, psychology, and neuroscience. The college includes departments such as Communication Sciences and Disorders, Physical Therapy, Marriage and Family Therapy, and Physician Assistant Studies. Crean College operates on Chapman University’s main campus in Orange, California, and at the Harry and Diane Rinker Health Science Campus in Irvine, California, a state-of-the-art graduate health science facility that opened in the mid-2010s and supports interdisciplinary education and research across health professions. The Physician Assistant Studies program has received national accreditation from the Accreditation Review Commission on Education for the Physician Assistant (ARC-PA), with continued status extending through 2030.

=== Donna Ford Attallah College of Educational Studies ===
The Donna Ford Attallah College of Educational Studies offers undergraduate Liberal Studies and Community Educational Studies degrees; teaching, school counseling, and school psychology credentials; and graduate degrees in teaching, special education, school counseling, school psychology, and leadership development, including a Ph.D. in education. The college is also home to various centers and programs for community engagement and research, including the Paulo Freire Democratic Project (PFDP) and Thompson Policy Institute on Disability. The Attallah College and its programs are accredited by the Council Accreditation of Educator Preparation, California Commission on Teacher Credentialing, National Association of School Psychologists, and International School Psychology Association.

The School of Education at Chapman University became the College of Educational Studies in August 2008. In 2017, the college was named in honor of alumna and benefactor Donna Ford Attallah. Attallah College is located in Chapman's Reeves Hall, one of the first buildings constructed on the site in 1913. It was added to the National Register for Historic Places in 1975, and it was renovated and reopened to the public in February 2018.

=== Dodge College of Film and Media Arts ===
In 2026, the college was ranked fourth by The Hollywood Reporter among American film schools.

=== Dale E. Fowler School of Law ===
The Chapman University School of Law is located in Kennedy Hall. Law degrees offered include the Juris Doctor (J.D.) and Master of Laws (LL.M.) degrees in various specialties.

=== Dale E. and Sarah Ann Fowler School of Engineering ===
The Fowler School of Engineering is the newest school within Chapman University. The school opened in 2019, and offers several undergraduate programs and minors, as well as one graduate program. The school is located in Chapman's Swenson Hall of Engineering, which comprises classrooms, study spaces, research labs, and makerspaces. The Design/Create/Innovate Lab (DCI) is a makerspace divided into two labs: the Prototyping Lab houses various types of 3D printers, a poster and sticker printer, and embroidery machines while the Manufacturing Lab houses manufacturing equipment including laser cutters, CNC mills, a PCB printer, and a water jet.

=== College of Performing Arts ===
Chapman University's College of Performing Arts, founded in 2007, operates in departments, namely the Hall-Musco Conservatory of Music, the Department of Dance, and the Department of Theatre.

=== Schmid College of Science and Technology ===
The Schmid College of Science and Technology was founded in 2008. In 2014, Schmid College was reorganized to splitting off the Crean College of Health and Behavioral Sciences. In 2019, the undergraduate programs in computer science, data analytics, software engineering, and game development programming transferred out of Schmid College to start the new Fowler School of Engineering.

In addition to its undergraduate and graduate programs, Schmid College is home to various centers for research. Among them are the Center of Excellence in Computation, Algebra and Topology (CECAT), the Center of Excellence in Complex and Hyper-complex Analysis (CECHA), and the Center of Excellence in Earth Systems Modeling and Observations (CEESMO). Schmid College is also affiliated with the Institute for Quantum Studies, whose list of physicists includes a 2013 Nobel Prize recipient and a 2010 Presidential Medal of Honor winner.

Schmid College of Science and Technology expanded and moved into the new 140,000 sq. ft. Keck Center for Science and Engineering in 2018, on Chapman's main campus in Orange, California. The research facility contains 45 research and teaching labs, 50 faculty offices, seven student-collaboration spaces, and an outdoor amphitheater. The aesthetic of the building was inspired by the work of architect Frank Lloyd Wright.

=== School of Pharmacy ===
The Chapman University School of Pharmacy (CUSP) is located at the Rinker Campus in Irvine. Pharmacy degrees include a Doctor of Pharmacy (Pharm.D.), a Master of Science in Pharmaceutical Science (MSPS), and a Doctor of Philosophy (Ph.D.) in Pharmaceutical Sciences.

=== School of Communication ===
The School of Communication is located on the university's main campus and housed within Doti Hall. The school offers three undergraduate majors. The school also offers graduate programs, including an MS in Health and Strategic Communication as well as a PhD program.

=== Wilkinson College of Arts, Humanities, and Social Sciences ===
Wilkinson College of Arts, Humanities, and Social Sciences is an academic college at Chapman University that offers undergraduate and graduate programs in a broad range of disciplines within the arts, humanities, and social sciences, including art, English, history, peace and justice studies, political science, sociology, and world languages and cultures. Established in 1991, Wilkinson's name honors the service and legacy of Chapman alumnus Harmon Wilkinson the college is home to numerous interdisciplinary centers, galleries, and institutes such as the Earl Babbie Research Center, the John Fowles Center for Creative Writing, the Center for the Creative and Cultural Industries, the Ludie & David C. Henley Social Sciences Research Laboratory, the Guggenheim Gallery, the Rodgers Center for Holocaust Education, and Tabula Poetica, which support research, public programming, and creative activity across the curriculum. The college plays a central role in Chapman’s liberal arts mission and contributes broadly to the university’s general education offerings.

== Student life ==
Chapman University has an active Greek life community, consisting of national sororities and fraternities.

== Rankings and admissions ==
Academic rankings

National
- Forbes: 200
- U.S. News & World Report: 110
- Washington Monthly: 356
- WSJ/College Pulse: 171

Global
- U.S. News & World Report: 1298

In U.S. News & World Report's 2020 rankings of the best colleges in America, the university was moved from the master's-level universities in the Western region to the National Universities group, with a debut ranking of tied at 125th. The reclassification was due to Chapman's elevation to R2 status by Carnegie Classification of Institutions of Higher Education in recognition of its high research activity. U.S. News uses the Carnegie Classifications for its categorization of universities.

For U.S. News & World Report's 2021 rankings, Chapman University was ranked tied for 124th overall among national universities, tied for 39th among 73 national universities evaluated for "Best Undergraduate Teaching", tied for 68th out of 83 for "Most Innovative Schools", tied for 86th of 142 for "Best Colleges for Veterans", and tied at 224th of 389 schools for "Top Performers on Social Mobility". The business school was ranked tied for 74th, and the law school tied for 111th, in the U.S. for 2021

For the Class of 2022 (enrolling fall 2018), Chapman received 14,198 applications, accepted 7,605 (53.6%), and enrolled 1,660. For the freshmen who enrolled, the average SAT score was 640 for reading and writing and 638 for math, while the average ACT composite score was 27.9. The average high school GPA was 3.75 (unweighted) on a 4.0 scale.

== Holocaust education ==
The Barry and Phyllis Rodgers Center for Holocaust Education was founded in February 2000. It sponsors an annual Holocaust remembrance writing competition and hosts a regular Distinguished Lecture series.

The Sala and Aron Samueli Holocaust Memorial Library, funded by Henry Samueli, is in the Leatherby Libraries. On April 11, 2005, sixty years after he was liberated from the Buchenwald concentration camp, Elie Wiesel dedicated the Samueli Holocaust Memorial Library, and a large bust of Wiesel stands at the entrance to the facility.

== Athletics ==
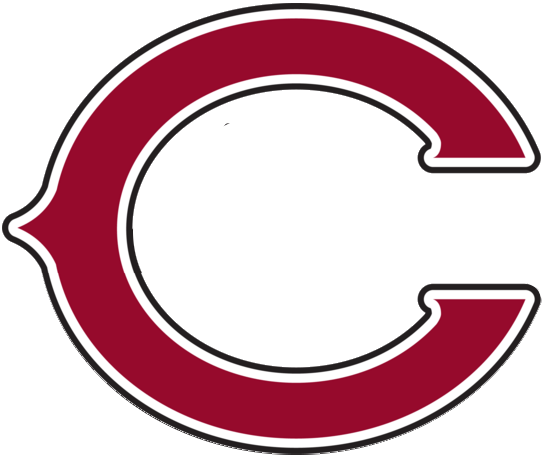
Chapman athletics monogram

Chapman's athletic teams are the Panthers. The university is a member of the Division III (non-scholarship) level of the National Collegiate Athletic Association (NCAA), primarily competing in the Southern California Intercollegiate Athletic Conference (SCIAC) since the 2011–12 academic year.

=== Accomplishments ===
The Chapman softball team appeared in one AIAW Women's College World Series in 1979.

In the 2014, 2017, 2019, 2023, and 2025 seasons, the school's football team won the SCIAC championship.

In 2003, the baseball team defeated Christopher Newport to capture the school's first NCAA Division III baseball tournament title. The 2019 men's baseball team defeated Birmingham-Southern College to capture their second Division III World Series crown.

The football and basketball teams are broadcast by the Chapman Sports Broadcast Network (CSBN) to local Channel 6 in Orange and on Chapman's athletic website. CSBN is a student-run, student-produced independent sports network created by students at Chapman University's Dodge College of Film and Media Arts.

== Notable people ==
=== Alumni ===
- George Argyros (1959) – U.S. ambassador to Spain and former owner of Seattle Mariners of Major League Baseball
- Ryan Bergara – creator of documentary entertainment web series BuzzFeed Unsolved
- David E. Bonior (MA 1972) – U.S. representative from Michigan (1977–2003), House minority whip (1995–2002), House majority whip (1991–95)
- Matt Duffer (2007) – film and television writer, director, producer, and co-creator of Stranger Things
- Ross Duffer (2007) – film and television writer, director, and producer, and co-creator of Stranger Things
- Hannah Einbinder – actress and comedian, known for her role as Ava Daniels in the HBO Max dramedy series Hacks
- Tim Flannery (1979) – Major League Baseball player for eleven seasons and coach for San Francisco Giants
- Cooper Hefner (2015) – chief creative officer and chief of global partnerships of Playboy Enterprises
- Randy Jones – former professional baseball player, San Diego Padres, New York Mets; 1976 Cy Young Award winner
- Owen Painter (BFA 2020) – actor, best known for his role as Isaac Night/Slurp in the Netflix series Wednesday
- Joanna Rosholm (2007) – press secretary to First Lady Michelle Obama
- Loretta Sanchez (1982) – United States House of Representatives
- Rob Schneiderman (MA) – United States House of Representatives
- Justin Simien (2005) – filmmaker, actor, and author; director of Dear White People
- Joan Staley – actress and model
- Jon Urbanchek (MA) – Hall of Fame University of Michigan swim and dive coach 1982–2004; led Michigan to win the 1995 NCAA Swimming and Diving Championship, and capture 13 Big Ten Championships; former University of Michigan swimming competitor 1959–61 and NCAA champion in the mile swim
- Wimberley Bluegrass Band – siblings who travel as a musical act; made headlines for graduating together; one member is Chapman's youngest graduate
- Kate Ziegler – 2012 Summer Olympics competitor and swimmer who specializes in freestyle and long-distance

=== Current and former faculty ===
- Yakir Aharonov – professor, James J. Farley Professorship in Natural Philosophy; Wolf Prize and National Medal of Science recipient
- Brian Alters – professor and director, Evolution Education Research Center
- Richard Bausch – professor in the Department of English
- Andrew Carroll – Presidential Fellow in American War Letters; founding director of the Center for American War Letters
- Martha Coolidge – professor, Lawrence and Kristina Dodge College of Film and Media Arts; Emmy-nominated film director; elected in 2001 as the first and only female president of the Directors Guild of America
- George Csicsery – 2017–2019 Presidential Fellow
- Grace Fong D.M.A. – director of Keyboard Studies at Conservatory of Music; winner of the 2006 Leeds International Piano Competition
- Carolyn Forché – Presidential Fellow in Creative Writing; poet
- Kyle Harrison – men's lacrosse assistant coach and professional lacrosse player
- Hugh Hewitt – professor, Dale E. Fowler School of Law; He served for six years in the Reagan Administration in a variety of posts including Assistant Counsel in the White House and Special Assistant to the Attorney General of the United States
- Jack Horner – Presidential Fellow; technical adviser for all Jurassic Park movies and was Michael Crichton's basis for the Alan Grant character
- Laurence Iannaccone – director, Institute for the Study of Religion, Economics, and Society; professor of Economics
- Cheryl Boone Isaacs – former president of the Academy of Motion Picture Arts and Sciences; inducted into the NAACP Hall of Fame in 2014
- Ebrahim Karimi – professor, T1 Canada Research Chair; Rutherford Memorial Medal and CAP Herzberg Medal recipient
- Bill Kroyer – professor, director of Digital Arts Program; one of the first animators to make the leap to computer animation as computer image choreographer on Disney's ground-breaking 1982 feature, Tron
- Tibor Machan (1939–2016) – held the R. C. Hoiles Chair of Business Ethics and Free Enterprise, Argyros School of Business & Economics
- Peter McLaren – Distinguished Professor in Critical Studies, Attallah College of Educational Studies
- Prexy Nesbitt – Presidential Fellow in Peace Studies
- Dimitar Ouzounov – research professor of geophysics at the Institute for Earth, Computing, Human and Observing (Institute for ECHO)
- Michael Shermer – Presidential Fellow in General Education, author of numerous books, and founder of The Skeptics Society
- Rebecca Skloot – Presidential Fellow in Creative Science Writing
- Mark Skousen – investment expert, economist, university professor
- Vernon L. Smith – Nobel Laureate in Economic Science (2002); founder of Economic Science Institute and Smith Institute for Political Economy and Philosophy
- Joel Stern – chairman and chief executive officer of Stern Value Management, formerly Stern Stewart & Co, and the creator and developer of economic value added
- Bart Wilson – Donald P. Kennedy Endowed Chair of Economics and Law in the Argyros School of Business & Economics
