= Vernon L. Smith =

American economist and Nobel laureate (born 1927)

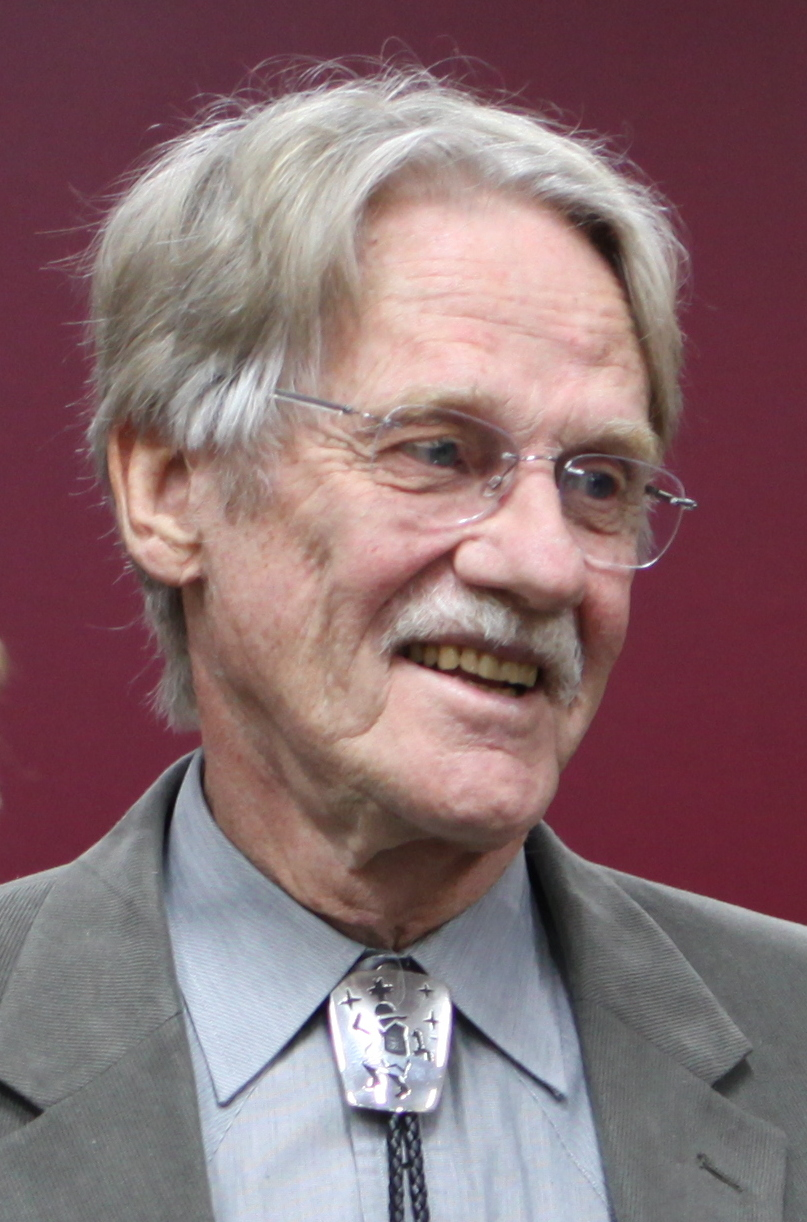
- Smith in 2011
- Born: Vernon Lomax Smith; January 1, 1927 (age 99); Wichita, Kansas, U.S.

Academic background
- Education: California Institute of Technology (BS); University of Kansas (MA); Harvard University (PhD)
- Thesis: A theoretical and empirical inquiry into the economic replacement of capital equipment (1955)
- Doctoral advisor: Wassily Leontief
- Influences: Friedrich Hayek; Richard S. Howey

Academic work
- Discipline: Experimental economics
- School or tradition: New classical economics
- Notable ideas: Combinatorial auction Experimental economics
- Awards: Nobel Memorial Prize in Economic Sciences (2002)
- Website: Information at IDEAS / RePEc

Vernon Lomax Smith (born January 1, 1927) is an American economist who is currently a professor of economics and law at Chapman University. He was formerly the McLellan/Regent's Professor of Economics at the University of Arizona, a professor of economics and law at George Mason University, and a board member of the Mercatus Center. Along with Daniel Kahneman, Smith won the 2002 Nobel Memorial Prize in Economic Sciences for his contributions to behavioral economics and his work in the field of experimental economics, which helped establish "laboratory experiments as a tool in empirical economic analysis, especially in the study of alternative market mechanisms."

Smith is the founder and president of the International Foundation for Research in Experimental Economics (IFREEE), a member of the Independent Institute's board of advisors, and a senior fellow at the Cato Institute in Washington D.C. He was elected a Fellow of the Econometric Society in 1987, and was elected to the National Academy of Sciences in 1995. In 2004, Smith was awarded an honorary doctorate by the Universidad Francisco Marroquín, where the Vernon Smith Center for Experimental Economics Research is named for him. He was also a founding board member of the Center for Growth and Opportunity at Utah State University. As of 2023, Smith also sits on the advisory board of the Madden Center for Value Creation at Florida Atlantic University.

== Early life and education ==
Smith was born in Wichita, Kansas, where he attended Wichita North High School and Friends University. Grover Bougher, Vernon's mother's first husband, who worked as a fireman on the Santa Fe railroad, died in an accident. The Santa Fe railroad's life insurance money was invested in a farm that became Vernon's family's sole means of survival during the tough years of the Great Depression. His childhood on the farm influenced his later interests.

Smith received his bachelor's degree in electrical engineering from Caltech in 1949, an M.A. in economics from the University of Kansas in 1952, and his Ph.D. in economics from Harvard University in 1955. His Ph.D. thesis title was A theoretical and empirical inquiry into the economic replacement of capital equipment.

== Academic career ==
Smith's first teaching post was at the Krannert School of Management, Purdue University, which he held from 1955 until 1967, attaining the rank of full professor.

Smith also taught as a visiting associate professor at Stanford University (1961–1962) and there made contact with Sidney Siegel, who was also doing work in experimental economics. Smith moved with his family to Massachusetts and got a position first at Brown University (1967–1968) and then at the University of Massachusetts (1968–1972). Smith also received appointments at the Center for Advanced Study in the Behavioral Sciences (1972–1973) and Caltech (1973–1975).

Much of the research that earned Smith the Nobel Memorial Prize in Economic Sciences was conducted at the University of Arizona between 1976 and 2001. In 2001, Smith left Arizona for George Mason University. From 2003 to 2006, he held the Rasmuson Chair of Economics at the University of Alaska Anchorage. In 2008, Smith founded the Economic Science Institute at Chapman University in Orange, California.

Smith has served on the board of editors of the American Economic Review, the Cato Journal, Journal of Economic Behavior and Organization, Science, Economic Theory, Economic Design, and the Journal of Economic Methodology. He also served as an expert for the Copenhagen Consensus.

=== Academic work ===
Smith began his work in experimental economics at Purdue University. As Smith describes it:

In the Autumn semester, 1955, I taught Principles of Economics, and found it a challenge to convey basic microeconomic theory to students. Why/how could any market approximate a competitive equilibrium? I resolved that on the first day of class the following semester, I would try running a market experiment that would give the students an opportunity to experience an actual market, and me the opportunity to observe one in which I knew, but they did not know what were the alleged driving conditions of supply and demand in that market.

In framing the experiment, Smith varied certain institutional parameters seen in the first classroom economics experiments as conducted by Edward Chamberlin: in particular, he ran the experiments for several trading periods, to give the student subjects time to train.

At Caltech, Charles Plott encouraged Smith to formalize the methodology of experimental economics, which he did in two articles. In 1976, "Experimental Economics: Induced Value Theory" was published in the American Economic Review (AER). It was the first articulation of the principle behind economic experiments. Six years later, these principles were expanded in "Microeconomic Systems as an Experimental Science," also in the AER. This paper adapts the principles of mechanism design, a microeconomic system developed by Leonid Hurwicz, to the development of economic experiments. In Hurwicz's formulation, a microeconomic system consists of an economic environment, an economic institution (or economic mechanism), and an economic outcome. The economic environment is simply the preferences of the people in the economy and the production capabilities of the firms in the economy. The key insight in this formulation is that the economic outcome can be affected by the economic institution. The mechanism design provides a formal means for tests of the performance of an economic institution, and experimental economics, as developed by Smith, provided a means for formal empirical assessment of the performance of economic institutions. The second main contribution of the paper is to the technique of induced values, the method used in controlled laboratory experiments in economics, political science, and psychology, which allows experimental economists to create a replica of a market in a laboratory. Subjects in an experiment are told that they can produce a "commodity" at a cost and then sell it to buyers. The seller earns the difference between the price received and its cost. Buyers are told that the commodity has a value to them when they consume it, and they earn the difference between the value of the commodity to them and its price. Using the technique, Smith and his coauthors have examined the performance of alternative trading mechanisms in resource allocation.

In February 2011, Smith participated in the "Visiting Scholars Series" at the Nicholas Academic Centers in Santa Ana, California, conducted in collaboration with Chapman University. Smith and his colleague Bart Wilson conducted experiments designed to expose high school students from underserved neighborhoods to market dynamics and how concepts such as altruism influence economic behavior.

Smith has authored or coauthored articles and books on capital theory, finance, natural resource economics and experimental economics. He was also one of the first to propose the combinatorial auction design, with Stephen J. Rassenti and Robert L. Bulfin in 1982.

In January 2009, Smith signed a public petition opposing the passage of the American Recovery and Reinvestment Act. In a 2010 Econ Journal Watch study, Smith was found to be one of the most active petition-signers among US economists.

The Vernon Smith Prize for the Advancement of Austrian Economics is named after him and is sponsored by the European Center of Austrian Economics.

Vernon Smith is renowned for his seminal contributions to the elucidation of spontaneous order within the field of economics. He posits spontaneous order as the organic emergence of structure and coherence from apparent disorder, a phenomenon ubiquitously observed in both social and economic contexts. His work on this has even extended out to using methods of self-organization from the physical sciences to model sociability. That framework shows how the same boundedly rational agents can exhibit either self-interested or reciprocal, socially responsive behavior as an emergent consequence of the interaction environment, rather than requiring economics to assume different kinds of people or rewrite the model for each setting. Smith has expounded upon the notion of spontaneous order in the context of his pedagogical endeavors as well. In his instructive course titled "Spontaneous Order and the Law" at the Fowler School of Law, Chapman University, he illuminates how social norms and legal frameworks emerge organically through human interaction, gradually coalescing from apparent chaos into structured societal systems.

In recent years, Smith's research has expanded to include the study of Neuroeconomics where he integrates economic theory with neuroscience to understand decision-making processes. Vernon Smith's work in this area has led to new insights into how brain activity influences economic decisions. Additionally, he has been instrumental in promoting the use of experimental methods in economics education, advocating for a hands-on approach to learning economic concepts. Some of these contributions were used in Neuroeconomics Lab books published by Academic Press (2014).

== Personal life ==
In February 2005, Smith publicly attributed features of his personality to Asperger syndrome after a process of self-diagnosis.

Smith donated his Nobel Prize medal to Chapman University in 2009.

== Works ==
- Gjerstad, Steven D.; Smith, Vernon L. (2014). Rethinking Housing Bubbles. New York: Cambridge University Press. ISBN 978-0-521-19809-7.
- Gjerstad, Steven; Smith, Vernon L. (2012). "At Home in the Great Recession". In Miniter, Brendan (ed.). The 4% Solution: Unleashing the Economic Growth America Needs. New York: Crown Business. pp. 345–377. ISBN 978-0-307-98614-6.
- Gjerstad, Steven D.; Smith, Vernon L. (2013). "Balance Sheet Crises: Causes, Consequences, and Responses" (PDF). Cato Journal. 33 (3): 437–470.
- Plott, Charles R., and Vernon L. Smith, ed. (2008). Handbook of Experimental Economics Results, v. 1, Elsevier. Description and preview.
- Rassenti, Stephen J.; Smith, Vernon L.; Bulfin, Robert L. (1982). "A Combinatorial Auction Mechanism for Airport Time Slot Allocation" (PDF). The Bell Journal of Economics. 13 (2): 402–417. doi:10.2307/3003463. JSTOR 3003463.
- Smith, Vernon L. (1962). "An Experimental Study of Competitive Market Behavior". Journal of Political Economy. 70 (2): 111–137. Bibcode:1962JPoEc..70..111S. doi:10.1086/258609. JSTOR 1861810. S2CID 54718519.
- _____ (1976). "Experimental Economics: Induced Value Theory" (PDF). American Economic Review. 66 (2): 274–279.
- Smith, Vernon L. (1980). "Relevance of Laboratory Experiments to Testing Resource Allocation Theory" (PDF). In Kmenta, Jan; Ramsey, James B. (eds.). Evaluation of Econometric Models. Academic Press. pp. 345–377. ISBN 978-0-12-416550-2.
- _____ (1982). "Microeconomic Systems as an Experimental Science" (PDF). American Economic Review. 72 (5): 923–955.
- _____ (1991). Papers in Experimental Economics [1962–88], Cambridge. Description and chapter-preview links.
- _____ (2000). Bargaining and Market Behavior: Essays in Experimental Economics [1990–98], Cambridge. Description and chapter-preview links.
- _____ (2003). Smith, Vernon L. (2003). "Constructivist and Ecological Rationality in Economics". American Economic Review. 93 (3): 465–508. doi:10.1257/000282803322156954. S2CID 16505135.
- _____ ([1987] 2008a). "experimental methods in economics." The New Palgrave Dictionary of Economics, 2nd Edition, Abstract.
- _____ (2008b). "experimental economics," The New Palgrave Dictionary of Economics, 2nd Edition, Abstract.
- Williams, Arlington W.; Ledyard, John O.; Gjerstad, Steven; Smith, Vernon L. (2000). "Concurrent Trading in Two Experimental Markets with Demand Interdependence". Economic Theory. 16 (3): 511–528. doi:10.1007/s001990050002. JSTOR 25055346. S2CID 195227181. Reprinted in Timothy N. Cason and Charles Noussair, ed. (2001), Advances in Experimental Markets, pp. 15– 32.
- Chorvat, T., McCabe, K., & Smith, V. (2005). Law and Neuroeconomics. Supreme Court Economic Review

== See also ==
- List of economists

== Notes ==
Awards
Preceded by George A. Akerlof; A. Michael Spence; Joseph E. Stiglitz	Laureate of the Nobel Memorial Prize in Economics; 2002; Served alongside: Daniel Kahneman	Succeeded by Robert F. Engle III; Clive W.J. Granger
