= Parlov =

Parlov is a Slavic surname. Notable people with the surname include:

- Goran Parlov (born 1967), Croatian comic book artist
- Ivan Parlov (born 1984), Croatian football midfielder
- Mate Parlov (1948–2008), Croatian boxer
  - Mate Parlov Sport Centre

== See also ==
- Parlow
