= Bart Wilson =

Bart Wilson (born 1969) is an experimental economist. He holds the Donald P. Kennedy Endowed Chair of Economics and Law in the Chapman University, Argyros School of Business and Economics. He is also the director of the Smith Institute for Political Economy and Philosophy and teaches courses in humanomics. His work has been widely published in both the popular and academic press.

== Career ==
Before coming to Chapman University, Wilson worked at George Mason University. Prior to his academic career, Wilson worked as an economist in the Division of Economic Policy Analysis at the Federal Trade Commission. He is also a guest lecturer at the Institute for Humane Studies.

== Views ==
Wilson argues that economists often force "ordinary human behavior to fit their models." For Wilson, this can confuse objective economic analysis.

After research and experimentation Wilson and Vernon L. Smith conclude that "a history of unenforced property rights hinders our subjects' ability to develop the requisite personal social arrangements to support specialization and effectively exploit impersonal long-distance trade."

Wilson argues that capacity constrained firms have a vested interest in not lowering their prices for new competitive markets.

== Education ==
- B.S. University of Wisconsin–Eau Claire
- Ph.D. University of Arizona

== Awards ==
In 2017, Wilson was awarded with the Allais Memorial Prize in Behavioral Sciences during the Prague Conference on Behavioral Sciences.

== Selected works ==
- Geography and Social Networks in Nascent Distal Exchange
- Social Preferences aren't Preferences
- Exchange and Specialisation as a Discovery Process
- Justice and Fairness in the Dictator Game
- Incremental Approaches to Establishing Trust
- Language Games of Reciprocity
- Experimental Gasoline Markets
- Fixed Revenue Auctions
- Historical Property Rights, Sociality, and the Emergence of Impersonal Exchange in Long-distance Trade
- An Experimental Investigation of Hobbesian Jungles
- Economics Works! Experiments in High School Classrooms
- The Property Species: Mine, Yours, and the Human Mind
