= Matthew J. Parlow =

Dean of Chapman University School of Law
- In office July 1, 2016 – June 30, 2021

Personal details
- Education: Loyola Marymount University (B.A.); Yale University (J.D.)

Matthew J. Parlow is the current President of Chapman University and the former Dean of Chapman University School of Law.

== Early life and education ==
Parlow grew up in Southern California. Parlow earned his bachelor's degree at Loyola Marymount University and his Juris Doctor at Yale Law School.

== Career ==
On December 10, 2024, it was announced that Parlow was chosen serve as Chapman’s 14th president, effective Sept. 2, 2025, following the planned retirement of current president Daniele Struppa from the Office of the President. Prior to this position, Parlow served as the Dean of Chapman University School of Law and the Donald P. Kennedy Chair in Law. He was previously the Associate Dean of Marquette University Law School. While at Marquette, Parlow co-taught a course with former MLB Commissioner Bud Selig.

== Personal life ==
Parlow married Janine Kim, who teaches at Chapman University School of Law. Parlow was on the board of Bradley Center until June 2016, when he resigned to take his position at Chapman.
