= Lawrence Bridges =

American writer and filmmaker

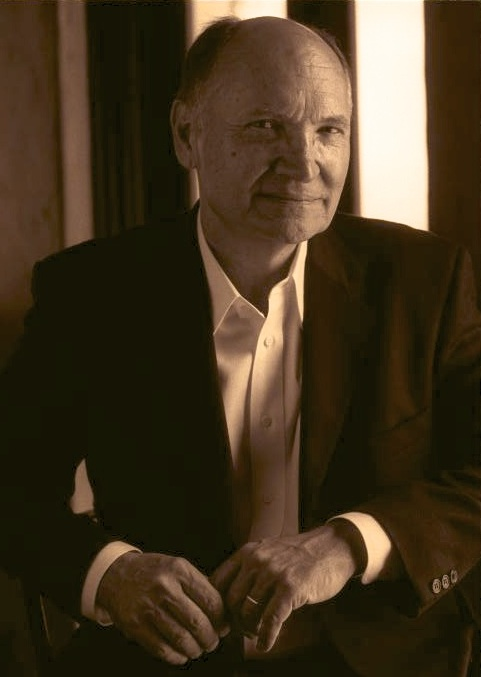
- Bridges in 2012
- Born: December 31, 1948 (age 77); Burbank, California, U.S.
- Education: Stanford University (B.A.); Dartmouth College Tuck School of Business (M.B.A.)
- Occupations: Writer; film director; film editor; poet
- Website: lawrencebridges.com

Lawrence Bridges (born 31 December 1948) is a writer, film director, film editor, and poet who is best known for his advertising work. He founded the Santa Monica editing and design company Red Car Inc., edited Michael Jackson's video for "Beat It", and directed and edited commercials whose hand-held, grainy style was widely imitated in the advertising industry. He has also published three collections of poetry.

== Career ==
Bridges began his film career at the age of 23 as a production assistant on Francis Ford Coppola's film The Conversation. He edited Jackson's "Beat It" in 1982, and afterwards founded the post-production company Red Car Inc.He has also been credited as editor on the Jackson videos "Dirty Diana" and "The Way You Make Me Feel", directed by Joe Pytka, and worked with the director Bob Giraldi.

Red Car produced and edited commercials for clients including Coca-Cola, Nike, American Express and Lee Jeans, among them Super Bowl advertisements for Nike and Coca-Cola.

Bridges edited a Honda motorcycle spot featuring Lou Reed and the song "Walk on the Wild Side", which led to the later work for Nike, American Express and Lee Jeans. He also directed commercials featuring Devo and, in 1988, cast Brad Pitt in a Pringles commercial, one of the actor's first jobs. For the Rock the Vote campaign, Bridges directed an advertisement featuring Robert Downey Jr. and Sarah Jessica Parker.

In 1987, in an interview with Rolling Stone, Stanley Kubrick praised Bridges' editing work for Michelob pale lager commercials. (Note: The commercials were directed by Joe Pytka.) Kubrick said that "the editing was some of the most brilliant work I've ever seen."

In Where the Suckers Moon, Randall Rothenberg credited Bridges with coining the term "metacommercial" for an advertisement that comments knowingly on its own form, and described his Honda scooter spot set to "Walk on the Wild Side" as an early example of postmodern advertising. The commercial used quick cuts, blurry texture, flash frames and reel run-outs, techniques drawn from the French New Wave.

Bridges was named "Best Advertising Auteur" by Connoisseur magazine in 1989. The Los Angeles Times later wrote that the techniques he pioneered as a reaction against formulaic commercials had become industry staples.

=== Film ===
12, initially projected on buildings from parking lots in New York, Los Angeles, San Francisco and Dallas, began the urban Guerrilla drive-in movement in the 1990s and early 2000s. Robert Koehler of Variety Magazine called the film "A dizzying, unforgettable adventure" while Dean Treadway of "Filmicability" placed it among his favorite 100 films of all time. 12 has also played at over 15 festivals worldwide and was honored with a "Best of Fest" award at the Syracuse International Film and Video Festival in 2004. The December 2003 issue of American Cinematographer featured an article on Lawrence's cinematography for the film as well.

Bridges' first poetry appeared in Stanford’s Sequoia Magazine in 1971 and later in Poetry and The New Yorker, while Bridges was starting his career in filmmaking in New York city, balancing jobs in editing TV commercials and driving a taxi cab. With the publication of Horses on Drums in 2006 Bridges was immediately described by Paul-Victor Winters as one of the new "Dissociative Poets", identified by Tony Hoagland as poets who do not write in traditional forms and eschew logical syntactical development, suggesting that our visual culture makes the crafting of traditional and linear narrative a difficult and boring task. Bridges' second book, Flip Days, was published in 2009 followed by Brownwood in 2016. He wrote the libretto for Jonathan Berger's "Tweets of Talya" which debuted at Stanford University in October 2015. Bridges has been a member of the Advisory Board of the Virginia Quarterly Review since 2011

In 2006, Bridges produced "StrangerAdventures", which was the first internet/TV game show where players from anywhere in the world could become participants with the main characters. The participants competed for cash and prizes during the week-long game. The show was nominated for a New Media Emmy award that same year.

Bridges is the creator of The Interview, (Kerry Reid, Chicago Tribune,) a theatrical production in which an interviewer instructs a solo performer to respond to instructions with personal stories in front of a live audience. The performer, a different one each night, is not given any prior knowledge of the instruction or prompts that will come their way.

Bridges is the president and CEO of Red Car Inc., a TV commercial production and post-production company he founded in 1982 with offices in New York, Chicago, Dallas, and Los Angeles.
