= Rob Schneiderman (politician) =

American college counselor and politician

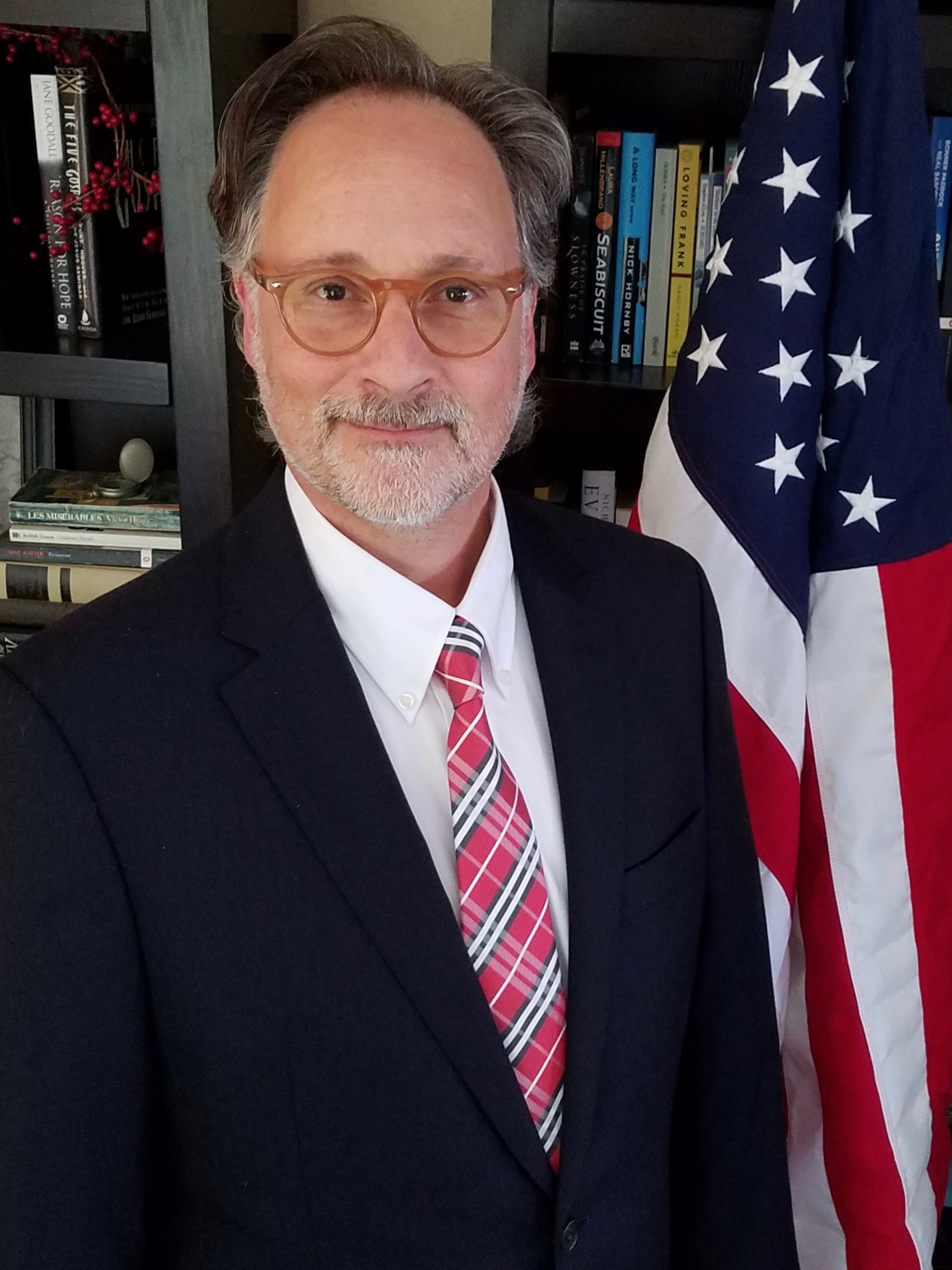
Rob Schneiderman

Robert "Rob" Schneiderman (born April 6, 1967) is an American professor and union president who was a Republican running for the U.S. House of Representatives for California's 45th congressional district in 2018.

== Early life ==
Schneiderman was born in 1967 in Pasadena, California. He earned a Bachelor of Science in Family Resources and Human Development from Arizona State University in 1990 and earned a Master in Arts in Counseling from Chapman University.

== Career ==
He has been a counselor at Orange Coast College since 1997. He was elected president of the Coast Federation of Educators (faculty union) in 2015 and reelected in 2017.

== Controversy ==
Schneiderman publicly defended professor Olga Perez Stable-Cox after she made inflammatory remarks about the election of Donald Trump and his supporters.
