= Canadian Authors =

1978 Canadian TV series

- Genre: Biography
- Country of origin: Canada
- Original language: English
- No. of seasons: 1

Production
- Running time: 30 minutes

Original release
- Network: CBC Television
- Release: 1 November – 21 December 1978

Canadian Authors is a Canadian biographical television series that aired on CBC Television in 1978.

== Premise ==
Episodes of this series featured various Canadian authors and were produced at various CBC facilities throughout Canada.

== Production ==
- Halifax: Harry J. Boyle, Alden Nowlan
- Montreal: Margaret Atwood, Michel Carneau, Jacques Godbout, Mordecai Richler, Yves Thériault, Hugh MacLennan
- Ottawa: David Helwig, Naim Kattan, Blaise Mukherjee, Dorothy O'Connell
- St. John's: Harold Horwood, Joey Smallwood
- Toronto: Carol Bolt, Robertson Davies, Marion Engel, Sylvia Fraser, Tom Hendry
- Vancouver: Barry Broadfoot, James Clavell, Jack Hodgins, Susan Musgrave
- Winnipeg: Heather Robertson, Ken Mitchell, Robert Kroetsch, Dorothy Livesay

== Scheduling ==
This half-hour series was broadcast from Monday to Thursday at 2:30 p.m. from 1 November to 21 December 1978.
