= California Christian College =

- Former name: California Bible Institute
- Type: Bible college
- Active: 1955–December 31, 2023
- Accreditation: TRACS
- Religious affiliation: California Association of Free Will Baptists
- Location: Fresno, California, United States; 36°46′0″N 119°43′58″W
- Website: calchristiancollege.edu

California Christian College (CCC) was a private Free Will Baptist Bible college in Fresno, California. It was established in 1955 by 48 Free Will Baptist congregations to address a shortage of trained pastors in the western United States.

== History ==
California Christian College was founded in 1955 as the California Bible Institute (CBI). The first classes were held at the First Free Will Baptist Church in Richmond, California. After the first semester, Sherwood Forest Free Will Baptist Church in El Sobrante also hosted classes.

In 1965, CBI relocated to the First Free Will Baptist Church of Fresno. That same year, approximately five acres were purchased at the intersection of University and Winery avenues in Fresno, where a permanent campus was established. During the 1966–67 academic year, the institution was renamed California Christian College and began offering a four-year Bachelor of Arts program.

In 1998, the college received accreditation from the Transnational Association of Christian Colleges and Schools (TRACS). The college offered an Associate of Arts in Liberal Studies, an Associate of Arts in Bible and Christian Ministry, and a Bachelor of Arts in Christian Ministry. The college offered an emphasis in Youth Ministry and the bachelor's program could include a minor in Biblical Interpretation.

After approximately 50 years at its University and Winery campus, the Board of Trustees voted in October 2014 to temporarily relocate the college. In 2015, it moved to the campus of Harmony Free Will Baptist Church near Belmont and Minnewawa avenues in Fresno while plans for a new campus were developed. However, no new campus was established before California Christian College ceased operations on December 31, 2023.

In March 2023, the college announced that it would close after the Spring 2023 semester, citing the financial demands associated with maintaining accreditation and complying with requirements of the United States Department of Education. Catalyst Bible College in Visalia allowed California Christian College students to transfer their credits and continue their education. It also agreed to became the custodian of California Christian College's records and purchase its library holdings, furnishings, and equipment.
