= Daniele C. Struppa =

Italian mathematician

- Born: Italy
- Known for: Presidency of Chapman University, research in mathematics, over 200 publications
- Spouse: Lisa Sparks
- Children: 4
- Awards: Bartolozzi Prize (1981), Matsumae Medal (1987), Cozzarelli Prize (2007), Donald Bren Presidential Chair in Mathematics (2019)

Academic background
- Education: University of Milan (B.Sc.), University of Maryland, College Park (Ph.D.)

Daniele C. Struppa is an Italian mathematician, academic, and former president of Chapman University in Orange County, California. Prior to becoming Chapman’s president, Struppa had served as its chancellor for nine years as well as its provost.

== Education and career ==
Struppa earned a degree in mathematics from the University of Milan, Italy, in 1977. He then moved to the United States in 1978 to pursue his Ph.D at the University of Maryland, College Park, earning his doctorate degree in mathematics in 1981.

Struppa began his academic career in Italy where he held positions at the University of Milan, at the Scuola Normale Superiore di Pisa and at the University of Calabria.

Having returned to America, Struppa accepted a professorship at George Mason University, where he founded a research center for the application of mathematics and served as director of it. In addition to serving as chairman of the Department of Mathematical Sciences at George Mason University, he was also appointed as associate dean for Graduate Programs and as Dean of the College of Arts and Sciences, a position he held for nine years.

In 2006, Struppa joined Chapman University as provost and chief academic officer. He remained in those positions until July 2007 when he was appointed chancellor.

On September 28, 2015, Struppa was elected 13th president of Chapman University and was inaugurated on September 1, 2016. He assumed office on September 1, 2016, succeeding Jim Doti, who served as president for 25 years.

In 2019, Struppa refused to take down two The Birth of a Nation posters at the Dodge College of Film and Media Arts at Chapman University. He outlined his reasons in an opinion piece called, "Why I won't take down the original 'The Birth of a Nation' poster." Black students at Chapman voiced opposition to Struppa's decision, and peaceful protests were organized on campus. Faculty members took a survey on their stance to remove the posters, and the posters were eventually taken down.

On December 10, 2024, it was announced that effective September 2, 2025 Struppa would retire from the Office of the President.

Struppa has authored more than 200 refereed publications and has edited several volumes. He is also the co-author of more than ten books, including The Mathematics of Superoscillations, with Chapman physicists Yakir Aharonov and Jeff Tollaksen.

== Honors and awards ==
In 1981, Struppa received the Bartolozzi Prize from the Italian Mathematical Union, and in 1987 the Matsumae Medal from the Matsumae International Foundation of Tokyo. In 2007, Struppa was also awarded the Cozzarelli Prize from the National Academy of Sciences for a paper he co-authored.

In 2006, the BIO-IT Coalition, a non-profit organization dedicated to the support of bioinformatics, established the Professor Daniele Struppa Award in Struppa’s honor.

Struppa was granted the Donald Bren Presidential Chair in Mathematics in 2019.

== Personal life ==
Struppa is married to Lisa Sparks, who is the founding Dean of the School of Communication and the Foster and Mary McGaw Endowed Professor at Chapman University. They have four children.
