= Jessica Bradley (curator) =

Canadian curator (born 1948)

- Born: Jessica May Bradley; 1948 (age 77–78); Birmingham, U.K.
- Education: Carleton University (B.A.); McGill University (M.A.)
- Occupation: Contemporary art curator
- Spouse: Geoffrey James

Jessica Bradley (born 1948) is a Canadian art curator who has served as a curator for contemporary art at the National Gallery of Canada (1979–1987) and as the lead curator in the Department of Contemporary art at the Art Gallery of Ontario (1995–2004), organizing exhibitions of Canadian and international art.

Bradley is the co-editor of an anthology of writing on Canadian contemporary art, Sight Lines: Reading Contemporary Canadian Art, and has authored several monographs, catalogues, and journal articles.

== Early life ==
Jessica Bradley was born in Birmingham, in the United Kingdom. She emigrated to Canada with her family in 1951. They settled first in Victoria, British Columbia, and then in Ottawa.

She attended Carleton University, Ottawa, for her B.A. in English literature and art history (1971); received a Certificat des études en langue et culture française from the University of Montpellier, France (1972); and took an honours year in art history at York University, Toronto (1972–1973). She received her M.A. in communications and cultural studies at McGill University, Montreal (1991); and was a doctoral candidate in art history, critical theory and communications at Concordia University, Montreal (1993–1995).

== Career ==
Bradley began her career in 1972 at the National Gallery of Canada as an education officer and in 1974 became liaison and special projects officer for the Art Bank of the Canada Council. From 1979 to 1987, she was associate curator of contemporary art at the National Gallery of Canada, and from 1987 to 1995 she was a freelance curator and critic in Montreal. In 1995 she was appointed as curator of contemporary art at the Art Gallery of Ontario (AGO) in Toronto, where she initiated the "Present Tense" series of exhibitions. She was commissioner for Canada's representation at the Venice Biennale in 1982, 1984, and 1999.

Bradley has organized exhibitions in Canada and abroad, including Displacements: Miroslaw Balka, Doris Salcedo and Rachel Whiteread (AGO, 1997) and Rodney Graham: A Little Thought (with Connie Butler and Grant Arnold, AGO/Los Angeles Museum of Contemporary Art/Vancouver Art Gallery, 2004).

Bradley has taught undergraduate and graduate courses in contemporary art history and critical theory at the University of Ottawa, Concordia University, and OCAD University. She was an adjunct professor in the Faculty of Fine Arts at York University, Toronto (1999–2005).

Bradley's publications on contemporary art in Canada include catalogues, books, and articles (several written for The Canadian Encyclopedia). She has organized, co-organized, or contributed essays to exhibition catalogues on the art of Giuseppe Penone (1983); Miroslaw Balka, Doris Salcedo, and Rachel Whiteread (1998); Rodney Graham (2004); Tom Dean (1999); Jana Sterbak (1989, 1993); Jin-me Yoon (1987); Dominique Blain (1994); Liz Magor (1984); and Rebecca Belmore (1994). She is the author of the e-book The Art of Betty Goodwin (Art Canada Institute, 2024). With Diana Nemiroff, she co-organized the exhibition Songs of Experience, which Peggy Gale described in Canadian Art as "a weather-vane for institutional winds of change". Her book Sight Lines: Reading Contemporary Canadian Art, a thematic anthology of 25 critical texts co-edited with Lesley Johnstone, was published by Editions Artexte (1994).

In 2005, she founded and directed Jessica Bradley Art + Projects in Toronto, which later became known as the Jessica Bradley Gallery and was regarded as a trendsetter in Canada and internationally. The gallery put on more than 80 exhibitions and specialized in the newer generations of artists. It closed in 2015. Since 2022, she has resided in Montreal, where she is an independent curator and contemporary art consultant.

In 2024-2025, she was the author of "Betty Goodwin: Life and Work", published on-line in 2026 by the Art Canada Institute.

== Selected exhibitions ==
=== National Gallery of Canada ===
- Pluralities (1980), with guest curators Chantal Pontbriand, Philip Fry, Alan Mackay, and Willard Holmes
- Paterson Ewen: Venice Biennale (1982)
- Giuseppe Penone (1983), toured to the Museum of Contemporary Art Chicago and the Fort Worth Art Museum
- Liz Magor/Ian Carr-Harris: Venice Biennale (1984)
- Songs of Experience (1986), co-curated with Diana Nemiroff

=== Art Gallery of Ontario ===
- Yinka Shonibare: Present Tense (1996)
- Jin-me Yoon/Kim Yasuda: The Distance Between (1997)
- Displacements: Miroslaw Balka, Doris Salcedo, Rachel Whiteread (1998)
- The Art of Betty Goodwin (1998), co-curated with Matthew Teitelbaum
- Tom Dean: The Whole Catastrophe (1999)
- House Guests: Contemporary Artists in The Grange (2001), featuring artists Luis Jacob, Robert Fones, Rebecca Belmore, Christy Thompson, Elaine Reichek, Elizabeth LeMoine, and Josiah McElheny
- Provisional Worlds (2002), featuring artists Shirley Tse, Christie Frields, Sara MacKillop, Damian Moppett, Kelly Richardson, James Carl, and Tony Feher
- Rodney Graham: A Little Thought (2003), toured to the Museum of Contemporary Art Los Angeles, the Institute of Contemporary Art Philadelphia, and the Vancouver Art Gallery

=== Independent ===
- Jana Sterbak, MacKenzie Art Gallery (1989)
- Kiki Smith, The Power Plant (1994)
- Betty Goodwin: Signs of Life, National Gallery of Canada and Art Gallery of Windsor (1996)
- Margaux Williamson: Interiors, McMichael Canadian Art Collection (2020)

== Honours and awards ==
- Canada Council Curator/Critic mid-career grant (1989, 1992)
- Canada Council Senior Arts Award (1994)
- Fonds pour la Formation de chercheurs et l'aide à la recherche doctoral fellowship (1993)
- Ontario Association of Art Galleries Curatorial Writing Award (1996)
