= Ann Thomas (curator) =

Canadian curator (born 1943)

- Born: August 4, 1943; Durban, South Africa
- Education: B.A. Sir George Williams University (now Concordia University), Montreal (graduated 1973) and M.F.A. Concordia University, Montreal (graduated 1976)
- Known for: Curator of Photographs at the National Gallery of Canada, Ottawa
- Spouse: Brydon Smith (m. 1986)

Ann Thomas (born August 4, 1943) was the curator of photography and was twice made the interim chief curator at the National Gallery of Canada, Ottawa (2010 and 2018). She retired from the gallery after working there more than 40 years in 2021. She now works as an independent curator. At the National Gallery, she curated or co-curated numerous major exhibitions and authored or co-authored their accompanying catalogues, and books, essays and articles on photography as well as lecturing and giving talks on the subject. In 2018, Thomas said:

My great passion has been for the collecting, for exhibitions and for educating people about photography and its role in the arts from the 19th century on,

== Career ==
Thomas was born in Durban, South Africa. On a visit to an art gallery in Johannesburg as a teenager, she was deeply moved from seeing the photographs of Peter Magubanee who documented the cruelties of white South African rule. Three years later, she realized that she had to get out of the country. She recalled later that she wanted to go to some place that was a little bit saner than South Africa in the midst of apartheid. After she attended the National Technical, Science and Fine Arts College, receiving her National Arts Teachers' Diploma in Port Elizabeth, South Africa (1962-1965), she emigrated to Canada, and taught school. She brought a group of students to Expo 67 and that convinced her that Montreal was a congenial place for her to live due to its energy and international feel.

She got her B.A. at Sir George Williams University (now Concordia University) in Montreal (1972-1973), then her Masters degree in Fine Art at Concordia (1974-1976). When she did her Masters degree in Art History, she did a piece of research on urban town planning. It was a history of town planning in Kingston, Montreal and Toronto up until Confederation, documentation for the Historic Sites board and the Inventory of Canadian Buildings, part of the Department of Indian and Northern Affairs. Her thesis for Concordia was on "The role of Environments here and now: three contemporary photographers: Lynne Cohen, Robert del Tredici, Karen Smiley, photography in Canadian painting, 1860-1900: relationships between the photographic image and a style of realism in painting" (1976).

She was hired by the National Gallery of Canada as Assistant Curator of photography in 1977 working with James W. Borcoman. She became made Associate Curator in 1989, Curator in 1994 responsible for the development and interpretation of 19th, 20th century, and contemporary international photographs and related materials and Senior Curator in 2012.

Her first show was in 1979 of a mini-history of architectural photos all drawn from the collection. Her next big show was of Lisette Model (1990). Other important exhibitions followed such as the Beauty of Another Order: Photography in Science - the catalogue was published by the National Gallery of Canada and Yale University Press in 1997 and won the Kraszna-Krausz Photography Book Award - and a show of Lynne Cohen in 2001.

Major shows which she curated and for which she authored or co-authored catalogues include Modernist Photographs from the National Gallery of Canada (2007) with its major book catalogue and thoughtful entries on photographers in the collection; Don McCullin: A Retrospective (2013), the first solo show of a photojournalist at the gallery; Made in America 1900-1950: Photographs from the National Gallery of Canada (2011); The Great War: the persuasive power of photography (2014) about which the Ottawa Citizen wrote "'Faked' and real images still shock 100 years later" and which had some of its photos discussed on radio; Luminous and True: The Photographs of Frederick H. Evans (2015); The intimate world of Josef Sudek (2016), the first exhibition of its scale with a 300 page catalogue; and The extended moment: fifty years of collecting photographs at the National Gallery of Canada (2018) which had 175 outstanding photographs in different media by 100 photographers from the collection of 200,000 photographs, organized in seven themes, and travelled to New York's Morgan Library and Museum.

Thomas was also a pioneer in collection building in photographs and broadened the guidelines of what was collected. Among the treasures she brought into the collection was one of Alvin Langdon Coburn's Vortographs which she was able to acquire in 2007. She has also authored a numbered of books, articles and essays for books. Among the most recent are "Isabelle Hayeur: American Dreams: Desert Shores", a monograph on Hayeur (2019), and "A Tale of Two Schools: "The New School for Social Research and the Photo League 1934-1955" published in "Frame and Focus: Photography as a Schooling Issue".

In 2018 she acted as the gallery's interim chief curator, and oversaw the Canadian Museum of Contemporary Photography (CPI) after the resignation of the director. In 2020, with her retirement in view, at Capture Photography Festival's inaugural virtual talk, she mentioned with gratitude artists, photographers, colleagues, collectors, and the collection, saying:

I learned so much from [them] ... that I believe I will take with me as much as I leave behind.

She retired from the National Gallery in 2021.

In 2024, for the Portrait Gallery of Canada, she curated the online exhibition Max Dean: Portrait of the Artist as Artist.

== Awards ==
Thomas' Lisette Model catalogue/book was one of the five recipients of 12th annual George Wittenborn Memorial Book Awards in 1990. Her show No Man's Land: The Photography of Lynne Cohen; Beauty of Another Order won the Kraszna-Krausz Photography Book Award in 1998. She was nominated for a Scotiabank Photography Award in 2011 and was a recipient of a three-month Getty Research Fellowship the same year.

== Professional activities ==
Thomas was an adjunct professor at Carleton University, Ottawa (2011-2014).
