= Portrait Gallery of Canada =

Coordinates: 45.422921°N 75.698655°W

The Portrait Gallery of Canada (Musée du portrait du Canada) is a federally-registered not-for-profit corporation that currently has no collection or physical presence.

== Location ==
Currently, the Portrait Gallery of Canada (PGC) exists as an online entity only.

== History ==
=== 1904: The Dominion Archives begins to collect portraits ===
Library and Archives Canada (LAC), known as The Dominion Archives at the time, was founded in 1872 and tasked with acquiring documents related to Canadian history. In 1904, Arthur George Doughty, the newly-appointed Dominion Archivist, began to include maps, flags, posters, portraits and other visual records to the nation's growing collection of written material.

Today, the LAC's portrait collection includes over 20,000 paintings, drawings and prints, four million photographs and several thousand caricatures, as well as 10,000 medals and philatelic items. The collection is stored at LAC's Preservation Centre in Gatineau, Quebec.

=== 1938—1956: A Royal Canadian Academician's dream ===
The lifelong dream of Canadian portrait artist John Wycliffe Lowes Forster (1850-1938), R.C.A., was to build a portrait gallery of historic and renowned Canadians. When he died in 1938, his estate bequeathed fifteen of his portraits to form the core of a national portrait collection and $10,000 towards the creation of a national portrait gallery. Although the Corporation of the National Portrait Gallery was registered in 1939, it was never realized. In 1956, members of the board transferred Forster's donation to the Royal Ontario Museum.

=== 1941—1971 ===
For 30 years, the National Film Board of Canada's Still Photography Division was mandated to document Canadian society in order to foster a sense of national cohesion. Official photographers travelled across Canada to document the daily lives of Canadians at home, at work and at play. At the time they were taken, these official portraits were reproduced in newspapers, magazines, and publications in Canada and internationally. The collection was later transferred to Library and Archives Canada.

=== 1998—2010: The Portrait Gallery of Canada, an LAC programme ===
In 1998, the Embassy of the United States in Canada vacated its former building at 100 Wellington Street in Ottawa and moved to its new building on Sussex Drive in 1999. Designated as a Classified Federal Heritage Building, the former U.S. embassy is valued for its classic Beaux-Arts architecture and for its prime location directly across from Parliament Hill.

In 2001, the Government of Canada, under the leadership of Prime Minister Jean Chrétien, announced that the former embassy would become the future site of a new Portrait Gallery of Canada, a venue for Library and Archives Canada (LAC) to showcase its national portrait collection. Dr. Lilly Koltun, head of LAC's Art and Photography Division, was appointed director general and plans were put in place to expand the building with a modern wing.

In 2003, British architect Edward Jones of London's Dixon Jones, Steven Teeple and Chris Radigan of Toronto's Teeple Architects, and Ottawa architect David Cole won a competition to design the new Portrait Gallery of Canada. Their proposal was to house the LAC's permanent collection of portraits in the former embassy building and to showcase temporary exhibitions in a new addition. Included in the design were administrative facilities, restoration laboratories, a lecture theatre and a rooftop café overlooking Parliament Hill.

Originally projected to cost $22 million, demolition costs, which included the removal and disposal of the electrical and mechanical system, wall partitions, and carcinogenic asbestos insulation, caused the budget to increase to $45 million. These issues caused the museum's anticipated 2006 opening to be delayed until at least 2007.

In 2006, despite five years of planning and $11 million already invested in the project, the Government of Canada, under the leadership of Prime Minister Stephen Harper, stopped further work on the building, citing escalating costs.

In November 2007, the Government of Canada announced a new competition. The government invited private developers from Halifax, Quebec City, Montreal, Ottawa-Gatineau, Toronto, Winnipeg, Edmonton, Calgary and Vancouver to submit proposals for a public-private partnership to build a new Portrait Gallery of Canada in their respective cities. The plan was to have the new museum built by 2012.

In 2008, Senator Jerry Grafstein introduced a private member's bill in the Senate of Canada (S-233) An Act to amend the Library and Archives of Canada Act (National Portrait Gallery) in order to establish a permanent display in Ottawa for portraits from the LAC's collection. The proposal was to return to the original 2001 idea of hosting the collection at the former U.S. embassy. Although the Senator reintroduced the bill (S-201) in 2009, the Senate did not pass it.

On November 7, 2008, the Government of Canada announced that its plans to select a new site for the Portrait Gallery of Canada based on proposals submitted by developers was cancelled. “In this time of global economic instability, it is important that the federal government continue to manage its own affairs prudently and pragmatically,” stated Minister of Canadian Heritage James Moore in a media release. “The selection process failed to meet the best interests of both the Portrait Gallery and taxpayers.”

In 2009, the Government of Canada cancelled all plans to create a new portrait gallery. Instead, it called on Library and Archives Canada (LAC) to create a web-based portrait portal of its collection. On May 30, 2012, the LAC launched its Portrait Portal on its website. Visitors to the LAC's website today, can use its search feature to access its online database of portraits.

=== 2016—2017: Public consultations ===
In August 2016, the Government of Canada, under the leadership of Prime Minister Justin Trudeau, invited Canadians to provide their input and ideas on the future use of the former U.S. embassy. Over 6,500 Canadians, as well as over 500 international visitors to the nation's capital, shared their views, which helped inform the government's decision.

Respondents were presented with a list of six possible public uses for the revitalized site at 100 Wellington Street. The three top choices were “Gallery” appealing to 57% of respondents, “Canada House” at 46%, followed by an “Indigenous cultural centre.” From those who supported the idea of a “Gallery,” two in three respondents specifically called for a portrait gallery.

In March 2017, under the patronage of The Right Honourable Beverley McLachlin, former Chief Justice of Canada, prominent art enthusiasts and community leaders joined forces to advocate for the Portrait Gallery of Canada. They commissioned a survey and concluded that the public's interest in having a national portrait gallery in the former United States embassy remained.

In April 2017, Senator Serge Joyal, Senator Paul McIntyre, Senator Patricia Bovey and Senator Douglas Black sent a letter to Prime Minister Justin Trudeau urging him to resurrect the portrait gallery project for the 150th anniversary of Canada. Fifty-five of the 99 sitting senators supported the initiative. "National Archives' portraits should be its base, but the gallery should be much more—vibrant, living, not just of the past but of the present, read the letter, noting the archives has more than 20,000 portrait paintings and photographs."

=== 2017: Announcing a new Indigenous Peoples Space for 100 Wellington Street, Ottawa ===
On June 21, 2017, on National Indigenous Peoples Day, the Government of Canada announced that the former United States embassy at 100 Wellington Street would be repurposed to house the future Indigenous Peoples Space. The Assembly of First Nations, the Inuit Tapiriit Kanatami and the Métis National Council agreed to assume responsibility for the project's vision and realization.

=== 2017—ongoing: The Portrait Gallery of Canada, a new not-for-profit corporation ===
After the Government of Canada's announcement in 2017, advocates for a Portrait Gallery of Canada (PGC) shifted their focus from lobbying the federal government to creating their own not-for-profit corporation.

Ottawa lawyer Lawson A.W. Hunter, who was one of the driving forces in realizing the Ottawa Art Gallery's new building, joined Senator Patricia Bovey, former director of the Winnipeg Art Gallery, to assemble an advisory group of artists, designers, writers, historians, politicians, senators, journalists, lawyers, executives and business leaders from across Canada to make the case for the PGC. The Right Honourable Beverley McLachlin, former chief justice of the Supreme Court of Canada, agreed to serve as the advisory group's patron.

In 2018, the Royal Canadian Academy of Arts (RCA) agreed to support this new private-public partnership, as a collaborator. Robert Tombs, artist, designer and president of the RCA, subsequently joined the PGC's volunteer Board of Directors.

In 2019, the PGC's advisory group commissioned Toronto's Lord Cultural Resources, an international agency that specializes in museum, cultural and heritage sector planning, to research, write and deliver its master plan.

On July 30, 2020, the Portrait Gallery of Canada launched its web presence and its first online exhibition Personae: Indigenous and Canadian Portraits 1861-2019, organized by guest curator Robert Tombs. Artists featured were: Wally Dion, Christine Fitzgerald, Thaddeus Holownia, Ruth Kaplan, Peter Krausz, Arnaud Maggs, William Notman, Karen Stentaford, Stephen Stober, Robert Tombs and Herbert Taylor.

On March 4, 2021, the Portrait Gallery of Canada officially became a federally-registered not-for-profit corporation.

On June 5, 2021, the PGC announced the appointment of Joanne Charette, former Vice-President Corporate Strategy and Communications, International Development Research Centre and former Director of Public Affairs, National Gallery of Canada, as its first gallery director, an interim assignment.

On August 19, 2021, the PGC launched its online exhibition In Keeping with Myself, organized by guest curator Darren Pottie. Artists featured were: Jaime Black, Catherine Blackburn, Rande Cook, Erika DeFreitas, Danièle Dennis, Olivia Johnston, Séamus Gallagher, Jean-Sébastien Gauthier, Christina Hajjar, Laura Hudspith, Jocelyn Keays, Suzy Lake, Meryl McMaster, Zinnia Naqkvi, Annie France Noël, Dainesha Nugent-Palache, Laurence Philomène, Skawenatti and Sage Szkabarnicki-Stuart.

On February 24, 2022, the PGC launched its first online solo exhibition Giiyaabi Omaa Nindayaamin (We Are Still Here) by KC Adams and curated by PGC curator Ann Davis.

On April 27, 2022, the Board of Directors of the Portrait Gallery of Canada announced the appointment of Robert Steven, former president and CEO of the Art Gallery of Burlington, as its new executive director, effective May 2, 2022.

Under Steven's leadership, the following online exhibitions took place:

- Max Dean: Portrait of the Artist as Artist curated by Ann Thomas, showcased online from September 14, 2022 to March 8, 2023, with an interactive "Hat, Photo, Portrait" activity with the artist at the Metro Toronto Convention Centre during the 2022 Art Toronto art fair.
- Gurdeep Pandher: A Portal to Joy, curated by Narendra Pachkhédé and launched online on March 10, 2023
- Letitia Fraser: This is My Fabric curated by Johanna Mizgala, with an in-person exhibition at the Metro Toronto Convention Centre from October 26-29, 2023 during Art Toronto.
- Raymonde April: A Portrait In Time, curated by Diana Nemiroff, launched online on September 27, 2024.

In late 2024, the PGC appointed Jessica Vellenga as interim executive director. She replaced outgoing director Robert Steven.
