= Maia-Mari Sutnik =

Canadian photography curator (born 1939)

Maia-Mari Sutnik CM
- Born: 1939 (age 86–87)
- Awards: Founders Achievement Award from the Toronto Friends of the Visual Arts (2016); Order of Canada (2023)

Maia-Mari Sutnik CM (born in 1939), was the first Curator of the Curatorial Department of Photography at the Art Gallery of Ontario in Toronto.

== Career ==
Maia Sutnik joined the Art Gallery of Ontario (AGO) in 1967 and held many positions at the AGO, including in the Department of Photographic Resources in the 1970s. Through her job, she accumulated resources and gained public support for annual exhibitions of photographs at the AGO; they included work by Robert Bourdeau, Lynne Cohen and others. Sutnik also initiated acquisitions such as Arnold Newman's Henry Moore (collage), Much Hadham, England in 1977 to complement the AGO’s collection of Henry Moore sculptures. She was inspired in her collecting policies by her mentor and personal hero, Sam Wagstaff, who was a "generalist" - that is, one who accepts all intended uses of photography, In 2000, the Curatorial Department of Photography was established in the AGO and she was made the Curator. (The only other institutional Curator of Photography in Canada was James W. Borcoman at the National Gallery of Canada, appointed in 1971).

The Photography Collection at AGO grew to become a truly representative collection by 2015 when she semi-retired. When she was made curator, it featured one acquisition, an ambrotype of a chalk drawing of Charlotte Bronte. But under Sutnik`s stewardship, it came to reflect the artistic, historical, and social impact of the medium with over 60,000 objects from the 1840s onwards. It includes early 19th century photographic examples of the medium’s development by practitioners, among them Linnaeus Tripe, Julia Margaret Cameron, and a rare collection of photographs from The 1851 Great Exhibition of Works of Industry of all Nations, also known as the Crystal Palace exhibition in London, England. In the 20th century, she acquired in-depth representations of vernacular World War I albums, personal albums and several international press agencies, alongside a critical mass of work by Josef Sudek, Alfred Eisenstaedt Diane Arbus and many others, combined with a Canadian representation of both 19th and 20th centuries, photographers such as Michel Lambeth and contemporaries such as Lynne Cohen, Jeff Wall, and Edward Burtynsky. Nor did she neglect European photographers.

Sutnik worked as a historian of photography, not just as an art historian, so that she always sought to look at the photograph, and if possible, the negative itself, to unearth the date of the work. Among the more than 70 exhibitions she coordinated and/or curated, Sutnik organized for the Art Gallery of Ontario such major exhibitions as a show of photographs by John Gutmann, tiled simply Gutmann (1985), Michel Lambeth: Photographer (1989), and Pop Photographica: Photography’s Objects in Everyday Life (2003). She organized the show Eisenstaedt: Two Visions (2006), produced in conjunction with the Museum of Fine Arts, Boston exhibition Ansel Adams. The exhibitions were called Two Photographers/Two Visions. Two Visions was viewed by critics as an odd combination but ultimately, as offering a twinned perspective on the 20th century, one about what is being left behind, one about what`s coming.

She organized the exhibition Josef Sudek: The Legacy of a Deeper Vision and both edited, curated and wrote for the book of the same title from Hirmer Verlag, Munich, distributed by University of Chicago Press, in 2012. In 2013, she was invited by Paris Photo to curate an exhibition, which culminated in Performance Propositions, featuring the Canadian artist Arnaud Maggs's autobiographical series, After Nadar in dialogue with selected original press prints of the 1930s from the Art Gallery of Ontario's collection, held at the Grand Palais, during Paris Photo in November. She also has contributed to many publications, including international editions of Contemporary Photographers and Contemporary Masterpieces, and for Imaging a Shattering Earth: Contemporary Photography and the Environmental Debate (2007).

Since 2005, as well as working at the Art Gallery of Ontario, Sutnik held an adjunct position at Toronto Metropolitan University (formerly Ryerson University), Image Arts Graduate Program - Photographic Preservation and Collections Management. She was one of the Canadian selectors and curator of AGO/Aeroplan, The Grange Prize in 2009 (she nominated Lynne Cohen). She semi-retired from the AGO in 2015 to become Curator Emeritus of Photography at the Art Gallery of Ontario, but continued working at the gallery to catalogue an acquisition of photographs by Diane Arbus.

== The Henryk Ross Photographs and Memory Unearthed ==
In 2015, Sutnik organized the travelling exhibition Memory Unearthed: The Łódź [Lodz] Ghetto Photographs of Henryk Ross, and edited as well as writing an essay Cruel Tragedies, Consoling Pleasures. Memory Unearthed: The Lodz Ghetto Photographs of Henryk Ross for the book Memory Unearthed: The Lodz Ghetto Photographs of Henryk Ross, Yale University Press. She also curated a special complimentary exhibition The Last Journey of the Jews of Łódź for the Oregon Jewish Museum and Center for Holocaust Education, Portland.

Publication of the Henryk Ross photographs in the book Memory Unearthed had an unexpected result. Survivors found relatives in them, and some even themselves. A woman (Kryssa Rosenstein, née Stopnicki), living in Quebec, found herself at the age of two with her parents, whom she was able to identify, from seeing the reproductions in the book. Due to the show and book, the Henryk Ross Photographs were covered widely in newspapers and on television, The photographs were put on youtube by the World Jewish Congress, Yad Vashem and the History Channel. The significance of the Łódź ghetto photographs and the work of Henryk Ross was discussed in depth by Yad Vashem.

== Awards ==
In 2016, she was awarded the Founders Achievement Award, from the Toronto Friends of the Visual Arts.

She was appointed as a Member of the Order of Canada in 2023.

== Personal life ==
In 2014, a show of her collection titled Curious Anarchy: The Photographic Collection of Maia-Mari Sutnik was held at the Image Centre, Toronto Metropolitan University (formerly Ryerson University), Toronto. She resides in Toronto.
