= TIAF =

TIAF may refer to:

- Toronto International Art Fair
- Tokyo International Anime Fair
- The Interfaith Alliance Foundation
  - The Interfaith Alliance of Florida
