= Geoffrey James (photographer) =

Canadian photographer (born 1942)

- Born: David Geoffrey Sedgwick James; January 9, 1942 (age 84); St. Asaph, Wales
- Occupation: Photographer
- Spouses: Ellen Sulkis (married 1966–1977); Jessica Bradley

Geoffrey James (born January 9, 1942) is a Canadian documentary photographer who lives in Montreal. He was influenced by Eugène Atget and has focused on built environments. Early in his career, James made panoramic landscapes; these black-and-white photographs illuminated his subjects, natural spaces and the changes wrought by society on the latter. A retrospective called Utopia/Dystopia was curated at the National Gallery of Canada in Ottawa in 2008.

Around 2010 he began to work as a digital photographer and his work, mainly of the city of Toronto, became more socially oriented. In 2016, he was appointed the first Photo Laureate of Toronto by Mayor John Tory.

James has exhibited photographs in shows about Slovenian architect Jože Plečnik, both in Canada (2019) and abroad (2022). In 2023, James was described as a "consummate photographer with a distinctive vision".

== Life and work ==
James was born in St Asaph, Wales, and attended Wellington College, Berkshire, and Wadham College, Oxford, where he received a degree in modern history in 1964. At Wadham College, he was editor of Isis, the student weekly magazine, and upon graduation left for a job as a reporter for the Philadelphia Bulletin. At this time, he bought a twin-lens Rolleiflex camera and began to teach himself photography.

He moved to Canada in 1966, where he was an associate editor of Time Canada in Montreal (1967–1975) and wrote cover stories on people and events such as Arthur Erickson, Robertson Davies, Mordecai Richler, Geneviève Bujold and the October Crisis. From 1975–1982, he was head of the Visual Arts, Film and Video section of the Canada Council. In 1977 he received a 1920s panoramic camera as a gift, which led him to new explorations in photography. From 1982 to 1984 James was a visiting professor at the University of Ottawa. He lived in Montreal for his first 18 years in Canada, moved to Toronto in the mid-1990s, spent 25 years there, and returned to Montreal in 2023.

Between 1987 and 2002, he used large-format and panoramic film cameras to record landscapes that have been impacted by human activity, choosing as his subjects places like the Roman Campagna and formal gardens. For several years, he photographed all the works of landscape architect Frederick Law Olmsted. In the early 1990s he photographed asbestos mining sites and the Mexico–United States border wall in Southern California. In the 2000s, he studied suburban and urban landscapes in cities such as Paris, France (2001); Lethbridge, Alberta (2002) and Toronto, Ontario (2006). A retrospective of his work, Utopia/Dystopia: Geoffrey James, was exhibited by the National Gallery of Canada in 2008. In a review of the catalogue book which accompanied the show, the Canadian Book Review Annual described James' work as mirroring society "with sometimes painful accuracy".

In 1971, James began exhibiting his work publicly. His first solo exhibition was at Sir George Williams University (now Concordia University) in Montreal. He has had solo exhibitions and retrospectives at NSCAD University (1983), the University of Kent (1985), the Canadian Museum of Contemporary Photography (1986), The Power Plant (1993), the Robert McLaughlin Gallery (2001), the National Gallery of Canada (2008) and the Oregon Centre for the Photographic Arts (2010). His work has been included in group exhibitions starting in 1977 with 13 Canadian Photographers, Madison Art Center, and afterwards at the Museum of Modern Art (1996, 2009), Canadian Centre for Architecture (1996, 2000), the National Gallery of Canada (1998, 2007, 2012) and elsewhere.

James transitioned into a digital photographer around 2010 and his photographs became more socially oriented. Before the Kingston Penitentiary officially closed in 2013, he made a formal study documenting and memorializing it during its final period of operation, which was published as a book in 2014. In the National Gallery of Canada Magazine, James' essay in the book, "Prison Notes", was described as "brief, but elegant". The magazine called his photographs a "surprisingly moving pictorial look". In 2016, he was appointed the first Photo Laureate of Toronto.

He has been interested in the modern architect Jože Plečnik, especially the social places he created in Ljubljana, Slovenia, for many years. In 2019, the John H. Daniels Faculty of Architecture, Landscape, and Design held an exhibition of James' photographs about Plečnik, Working Spaces/CivicSettings: Joze Plecnik in Ljubljana, and in 2022 his show Social Spaces: Joze Plecnik and Ljubljana was exhibited at the Architekturzentrum Wien, Vienna, and at UNESCO, Paris. James's photographs, taken during both the day and night and throughout the seasons, show Plečnik's studio and the wide range of his urban architecture. In the exhibition at the Daniels School of Architecture, photographs on multiple digital screens illuminated the architect's social spaces.

About the ability of photography to change society, he has said: "I think my work deals with the real world and it deals sometimes with social problems but I've absolutely no delusions about the power of art to change peoples minds. I think the least effective way of effecting social change is to take photographs". He believes that photography has "a mnemonic power that no other medium has, [that is,] a power to recall things", and that "a really good photo can be an object of reverie, of dreaming".

In 2022, his work was included in a group exhibition titled Wanderlust: Around the World in 80 Photographs at the Stephen Bulger Gallery in Toronto and also in an exhibition titled I Was Here at the Art Gallery of Ontario in Toronto. He received an honorary doctorate from St. John's College, Manitoba, in 2022. He is represented by Trépanier Baer Gallery in Calgary, the Equinox Gallery in Vancouver and the Stephen Bulger Gallery in Toronto. He is a fellow of the Graham Foundation for Advanced Studies in the Fine Arts and a member of the Royal Canadian Academy of Arts.

== Selected publications ==
=== Exhibition catalogues and contributions ===
- James, Geoffrey (1986). Morbid Symptoms: Arcadia and the French Revolution. Afterword by Monique Mosser. Princeton Architectural Press. ISBN 978-0-910413-34-3.
- James, Geoffrey (1986). Genius Loci. Essay by Martha Langford. Ottawa: Canadian Museum of Contemporary Photography. ISBN 978-0-88884-551-1.
- James, Geoffrey (1991). La Campagna Romana. Montreal: Éditions Galerie René Blouin.
- James, Geoffrey (1991). The Italian garden. Essay by Robert Harbison. New York: H. N. Abrams. ISBN 978-0-8109-3456-6.
- Burley, Robert; Friedlander, Lee; James, Geoffrey (1996). Viewing Olmsted. Prologue by Phyllis Lambert and essay by John Szarkowski. Montréal: Canadian Centre for Architecture. ISBN 978-0-920785-58-4.
- James, Geoffrey (1999). Running fence. Essays by Elizabeth Armstrong, Sebastian Rotella and Dot Tuer. North Vancouver: Presentation House Gallery. ISBN 978-0-920293-45-4.
- Constantini, Paolo; Weski, Thomas (2000). Mescola, Sandro (ed.). Identificazione di un Paesaggio: Venezia-Marghera. Photographs by Lewis Baltz, John Davies, Jean Louis Garnell, Frank Gohlke, John Gossage, Anthony Hernandez, Axel Hütte, Geoffrey James, Richard Pare, Toshio Shibata and Stephen Shore, and video installation by Studio Azzurro. Sandra Mix. ISBN 9788882152468.
- Damisch, Hubert (2001). Paris: Geoffrey James. Paris: Services culturels de l'Ambassade du Canada. ISBN 978-1-896940-21-2.
- Marie, Dyan (2001). Geoffrey James: Parks and Walkways of Oshawa. Foreword by Linda Jansma. Oshawa: Robert McLaughlin Gallery. ISBN 978-0-921500-41-4.
- Wiebe, Rudy; James, Geoffrey (2002). Place: Lethbridge, a city on the prairie. Vancouver; Toronto: Douglas & McIntyre. ISBN 978-1-55054-931-7.
- James, Geoffrey (2003). Past/Present/Future. Contributions by Liz Wylie, Robert Fulford, Peter O’Brien and Larry Wayne Richards. Toronto: The University of Toronto Art Centre in cooperation with the University of Toronto's Faculty of Architecture, Landscape and Design. ISBN 978-0-7727-0652-2.
- Young, Brian; James, Geoffrey (2003). Respectable burial: Montreal's Mount Royal Cemetery. Montreal: McGill-Queen's University Press. ISBN 978-0-7735-2529-0.
- Padon, Thomas; Harrison, Robert Pogue; Jones, Ronald; Neshat, Shirin (2004). Contemporary Photography and the Garden: deceits & fantasies. Featuring work by Sally Apfelbaum, Daniel Boudinet, Gregory Crewdson, Peter Fischli and David Weiss, Sally Gall, Lynn Geesaman, Linda Hackett, Geoffrey James, Len Jenshel, Erica Lennard, Sally Mann, Catherine Opie, Jack Pierson, Marc Quinn and Jean Rault. New York: H. N. Abrams in association with the American Federation of Arts.
- James, Geoffrey (2006). Toronto. Introduction by Mark Kingwell. Vancouver: Douglas & McIntyre. ISBN 9781553652069.
- Smith, Annick; O'Connor, Susan, eds. (2008). The Wide Open: Prose, Poetry and Photographs of the Prairie. With contributions by Rick Bass, Mary Clearman Blew, Judy Blunt, Lois Conner, David James Duncan, Gretel Ehrlich, Dan Flores, Richard Ford, Lee Friedlander, James Galvin, Ian Glennie, Jim Harrison, Richard Hugo, Fredericka Hunter, Geoffrey James, William Kittredge, Barry Lopez, Richard Manning, Peter Matthiessen, Thomas McGuane, Susan O?Connor, Annick Smith, M. L. Smoker, Stephenie Ambrose Tubbs and James Welch. University of Nebraska Press. ISBN 978-0-8032-1751-5.;
- Pauli, Lori (2008). Utopia/Dystopia: Geoffrey James. Essays by Stephen Bann and Britt Salvesen. Ottawa; Vancouver: National Gallery of Canada; Douglas & McIntyre. ISBN 9781553653479.
- James, Geoffrey (2008). Field notes. Kitchener Waterloo Art Gallery. ISBN 9780978266998.;
- Coutts, Jim; Mills, Josephine (2011). Safe Home: the Coutts Gift featuring the Nanton Project by Geoffrey James. Lethbridge: University of Lethbridge Art Gallery. ISBN 9780919555419.
- James, Geoffrey (2014). Inside Kingston Penitentiary (1835-2013). London: Black Dog Publishing. ISBN 9781908966766.;
- Residue: the persistence of the real. Featuring work by Robert Burley, Stan Douglas, Babak Golkar, Geoffrey James, Brian Jungen, Duane Linklater, Catherine Opie and Amie Siegel. London; Vancouver: Black Dog Publishing; Vancouver Art Gallery. 2015. ISBN 978-1910433263.
- Kealy, Séamus; Boué, F.P. (2014). Punctum: Bemerkungen zur Photographie. Featuring work by Paul Allen, Kader Attia, Sabine Bitter, Helmut Weber, Iñaki Bonillas, Oscar de Marcos, Moyra Davey, Willie Doherty, Ines Doujak, Ed van der Elsken, Antje Ehmann, Seiichi Furuya, Carlo Gentil, Gauri Gill, Felix Gmelin, Barbad Golshiri, Pablo Guardiola, Matthias Herrmann, Spring Hurlbut, Rainer Iglar, Geoffrey James, Anna Jermolaewa, Simone Kappeler, Eva Kotátková, Suzanne Lafont, Robert Lebeck, Tatiana Lecomte, Ken Lum, Anja Manfredi, Team of Albrecht Meydenbauer, Natalia Nikitin, August Sander, Cathrien van Ommen, Alison Rossiter, Klaus Scherübel, Hiroshi Sugimoto, Walker & Walker, Carleton Watkins, Tom Wood, Francesca Woodman, Paolo Woods and Andreas Wutz. Salzburg: Fotohof Edition; Salzburger Kunstverein. ISBN 978-3902993052.
- James, Geoffrey (2024). Canadian Photographs. Vancouver: Figure 1.

=== Articles and book chapters ===
- "An inquiry into the aesthetics of photography". Artscanada (192–195). Edited by Geoffrey James and others. December 1974.
- Tata, Sam (1983). A certain identity: 50 portraits. Foreword by Geoffrey James. Ottawa: Deneau. ISBN 978-0-88879-089-7.
- Thirteen Essays on Photography. Introduction by Geoffrey James. Ottawa: Canadian Museum of Contemporary Photography. 1990. ISBN 978-0-88884-557-3.
- James, Geoffrey (2012). "Josef Sudek and the panorama". In Sutnik, Maia-Mari (ed.). Josef Sudek: the legacy of a deeper vision. Munich: Hirmer. ISBN 9783777452913.

== Public collections ==
- Agnes Etherington Art Centre
- Art Gallery of Alberta
- Art Gallery of Ontario
- Canada Council Art Bank
- Canadian Centre for Architecture
- Cleveland Museum of Art
- Concordia University
- Library and Archives Canada
- Glenbow Museum
- Montreal Museum of Fine Arts
- Musée Carnavalet
- Museum of Modern Art
- National Gallery of Canada
- Museum of Contemporary Art San Diego
- San Francisco Museum of Modern Art
- Vancouver Art Gallery
- Winnipeg Art Gallery

== Awards ==
- Guggenheim Fellowship (1989)
- Canada Council Victor Lynch-Staunton Prize (1991)
- Roloff Beny Prize (2002)
- Gershon Iskowitz Foundation Prize (2002)
- Governor General's Awards in Visual and Media Arts (2012)
