= 2004 in art =

List of years in art	(table)
- … 1994; 1995; 1996; 1997; 1998; 1999; 2000; 2001; 2002; 2003; 2004; 2005; 2006; 2007; 2008; 2009; 2010; 2011; 2012; 2013; 2014 …
- Art; Archaeology; Architecture; Literature; Music; Philosophy; Science; +...

The year 2004 in art involved various significant events and new art works.

== Events ==
- April – A Belgian activist group cuts off the left hand of a bronze Congolese figure in a monument to Leopold II of Belgium in Ostend as a protest against colonial atrocities.
- 24 May – A fire in the Momart storage warehouse destroys major works by Helen Chadwick, Tracey Emin, Patrick Heron, Damien Hirst and other British artists.
- 18 July – The subterranean Chichu Art Museum on the Japanese island of Naoshima, designed by Tadao Ando, opens.
- 11 December – İstanbul Modern (art museum) is established in Turkey. The country's first modern art museum, the Doğançay Museum, opened earlier in the year, also in Istanbul; it is dedicated to the artistic legacy of Burhan Doğançay.

== Works ==
- David Backhouse – Animals in War Memorial (London)
- Banksy
  - Di-faced Tenner (multiple copies)
  - Kissing Coppers (stencil graffiti originally in Brighton)
- Bruce Beasley – Encounter (sculpture, Eugene, Oregon)
- Lucian Freud – The Brigadier (portrait of Andrew Parker Bowles)
- Rachel Joynt – Noah's Egg (sculpture at Veterinary Sciences Centre, University College Dublin in Ireland)
- Liz Magor – LightShed (installation, Vancouver)
- Cornelia Parker – Perpetual Canon (installation)
- Paula Rego – The Cake Woman
- Donald Wilson – Holon (sculpture, Portland, Oregon)
- Statue of Mahatma Gandhi (Houston, Texas)
- Artworks at Millennium Park in Chicago, United States:
  - Anish Kapoor – Cloud Gate
  - Jaume Plensa – Crown Fountain

== Awards ==
- Archibald Prize – Craig Ruddy, David Gulpilil, two worlds
- Artes Mundi Prize – Xu Bing
- Beck's Futures – Saskia Olde Wolbers
- Hugo Boss Prize – Rirkrit Tiravanija
- Caldecott Medal for children's book illustration – Mordicai Gerstein, The Man Who Walked Between the Towers
- En Foco's New Works Photography Award – Manuel Rivera-Ortiz
- John Moores Painting Prize – Alexis Harding, Slump/Fear (orange/black)
- Wynne prize – George Tjungurrayi, Untitled

== Exhibitions ==
- Edward Delaney retrospective at the Royal Hibernian Academy, Dublin
- Drawings of Jim Dine at the National Gallery of Art, Washington, D.C.
- Erich Heckel – His Work in the 1920s at the Brücke Museum, Berlin
- Paul Henry at the National Gallery of Ireland, Dublin
- Edward Hopper at the Tate Gallery, London

== Films ==
- Modigliani

== Deaths ==
=== January to March ===
- 4 January – Jeff Nuttall, English poet, publisher, actor, painter and sculptor (b.1933)
- 9 January – Nissim Ezekiel, Indian poet, playwright and art critic (b.1924)
- 3 February - Ward Jackson, American painter (b. 1928)
- 7 February – Norman Thelwell, English cartoonist (b.1923)
- 4 March – Stephen Sprouse, American fashion designer and artist (b.1953)
- 12 March – Milton Resnick, American painter (b.1917)
- 13 March – René Laloux, French animator and film director (b.1929)
- 27 March - Gerome Kamrowski, American artist (b.1914)

=== April to June ===
- 1 April – Enrique Grau, Colombian painter and sculptor (b.1920)
- 7 April – Wolfgang Mattheuer, German painter and sculptor (b.1927)
- 13 April – Muriel Berman, American art collector and philanthropist, co-founder of the Philip and Muriel Berman Museum at Ursinus College in Collegeville, Pennsylvania
- 25 April – Jacques Rouxel, French animator (b.1931)
- 12 May – Syd Hoff, American children’s book author and cartoonist (b.1912)
- 28 May – Jean-Philippe Charbonnier, French photographer (b.1921)
- 5 June – Fiore de Henriquez, Italian-born British sculptor (b.1921)
- 11 June – Egon von Fürstenberg, Swiss fashion designer (b.1946)
- 15 June – Lothar Fischer, German sculptor (b.1933)

=== July to September ===
- 2 July – John Cullen Murphy, American comics artist (b.1919)
- 19 July – Sylvia Daoust, Canadian sculptor (b.1902)
- 3 August – Henri Cartier-Bresson, French photographer (b.1908)
- 4 August – Cécile Guillame, first woman to engrave a French postal stamps (b.1933).
- 8 August – Leon Golub, American painter (b.1922).
- 9 August – Liisi Beckmann, Finnish artist and designer (b.1924).
- 8 September – Frank Thomas, American animator (b.1912)
- 19 September – Eddie Adams, American Pulitzer Prize-winning photographer (b.1933)

=== October to December ===
- 1 October – Richard Avedon, American photographer (b.1923).
- 13 October – Ivor Wood, English stop-motion animator (b.1932).
- 15 October – Irv Novick, American comic book artist (b.1916).
- 13 November – Harry Lampert, American cartoonist, advertising artist and author (b.1916).
- 19 November
  - Trina Schart Hyman, American illustrator of children's books (b.1939).
  - Piet Esser, Dutch sculptor (b.1914).
- 22 November – Leo Dee, American silverpoint artist (b.1931).
- 25 November – Ed Paschke, Polish-American painter (b.1939).
- 9 December – Sergey Voychenko, Belarusian artist and designer (b.1955).
- 16 December – Agnes Martin, Canadian-American painter (b.1912).
- 17 December – Tom Wesselmann, American pop artist (b.1931).
- December – Cleve Gray, American Abstract expressionist painter (b.1918).

== See also ==
- List of years in art
