= LightShed =

Sculpture by Liz Magor in Vancouver, British Columbia, Canada

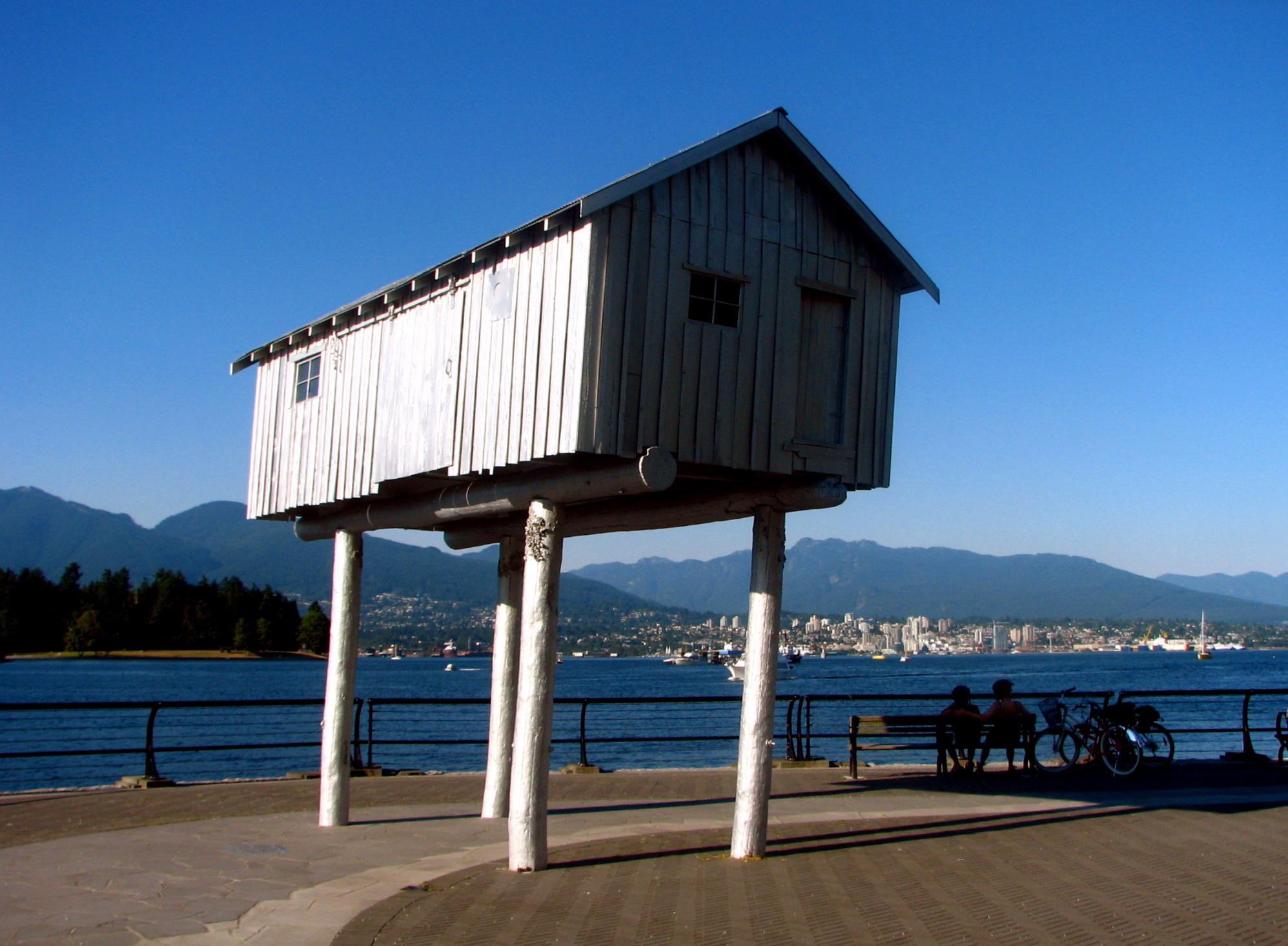
- LightShed in 2006
- Artist: Liz Magor
- Year: 2004
- Type: Sculpture
- Medium: Aluminum
- Location: Vancouver, British Columbia, Canada; 49°17′29″N 123°07′24″W

LightShed is a 2004 sculpture by Liz Magor, located on the seawall of Harbour Green Park in the Coal Harbour neighbourhood of Vancouver, British Columbia, Canada. The work was privately commissioned by Grosvenor Canada Limited but was subjected to the same processes and guidelines required by the City of Vancouver's public art program, including a call for submissions, juried selection and public hearing.

== See also ==
- 2004 in art
