= Spring Hurlbut =

Canadian artist (born 1952)

- Born: April 11, 1952 (age 74); Toronto
- Education: OCAD University, NSCAD University
- Website: www.springhurlbut.com

Spring Hurlbut (born 11 April 1952) is a Canadian artist, known for work that deals with the relationship between sculpture and architecture, and with themes of mortality. She lives and works in Toronto.

== Education ==
Hurlbut studied at the Ontario College of Art and Design, now known as OCAD University from 1971 to 1973 and the Nova Scotia College of Art and Design (NSCAD University) from 1973 to 1975.

== Works ==
Early in her career, Hurlbut created on-site work using plaster that dispelled the 'common assumption that our built environment simply exists'. Beginning in her studio in 1977, Hurlbut made a number of wall works. A hand plastered wall work The Wall was made in the Art Gallery of Ontario in 1981 and the Württembergischer Kunstverein Stuttgart in 1983. The installation Three Tree Columns was featured at the Toronto Sculpture Garden in 1986 and on the campus of York University in 1989. Its components included actual tree trunks with Doric bases and capitals made from steel. In her later work, she investigated the origins of classical Greek architecture. Ovo and Claw Entablature (1990) is an example of such work. The Final Sleep/Le Dernier Sommeil was an installation created from Artifacts in the Royal Ontario Museum in 2001

In the mid 90s Hurlbut began to photograph cremated ashes. Several of those works, Mary #3 (2006), Peewee #2 (2007) and Scarlett #1 (2005) are in the collection of the National Gallery of Canada. Airborne, a slow-motion video work from 2008 is a reflection on mortality. It documents the release of human ashes entrusted to the artist by relatives of the deceased, including her own father.

Hurlbut and her partner, the photographer Arnaud Maggs, were the subject of the film Spring & Arnaud, which premiered at the Hot Docs Canadian International Documentary Festival in April 2013. In the 1990s, Hurlbut and Maggs divided their time between Toronto and France, spending their summers exploring French flea markets and finding objects to incorporate into their works, which explored similar themes of time, life and death, and loss.

Hurlbut's work is in the permanent collection of the Musée d'art contemporain de Montréal and the National Gallery of Canada.

Hurlbut was awarded the Governor General's Awards in Visual and Media Arts in 2018.

== Bibliography ==
- Hurlbut, Spring; Dewdney, Christopher; Contemporary Art Gallery (Vancouver, B.C.) (1990). Spring Hurlbut. Vancouver: Contemporary Art Gallery. ISBN 978-0-920751-27-5.
- Hurlbut, Spring; Antaki, Karen; Leonard and Bina Ellen Art Gallery (1996). Spring Hurlbut, l'ascension. Montréal: Leonard & Bina Ellen Art Gallery = Galerie d'art Leonard & Bina Ellen. ISBN 978-2-920394-40-7.
- Dompierre, Louise; Hurlbut, Spring; Power Plant (Art gallery) (1995). Spring Hurlbut: la somnolence. Toronto, Ont., Canada: Power Plant. ISBN 978-0-921047-85-8.
- Hurlbut, Spring; National Gallery of Canada (1992). In conjunction with Sacrificial Ornament: recent works by Spring Hurlbut. [Ottawa]: [National Gallery of Canada = Musée des beaux-arts du Canada].
- Hurlbut, Spring; Baluk, Ulana; McLuhan, Elizabeth; Royal Ontario Museum (2001). Spring Hurlbut - the final sleep, le dernier sommeil [catalogue of an exhibition held at the Royal Ontario Museum, 28 April - 19 August 2001]. Toronto, Ontario: Royal Ontario Museum. ISBN 978-0-88854-436-0.
- Art Gallery of Ontario (1981). Spring Hurlbut, Ron Martin, John Massey, Becky Singleton: June 5-July 19, 1981, Art Gallery of Ontario. Toronto, Canada: The Art Gallery. ISBN 978-0-919876-74-3.
