= Deanna Bowen =

Canadian-American visual artist

- Born: November 5, 1969 (age 57); Oakland, California, U.S.
- Education: Emily Carr University of Art and Design; University of Toronto
- Known for: Video Artist; Installation Artist; Conceptual Artist
- Movement: Contemporary Art
- Awards: Governor General's Awards in Visual and Media Arts (2020), John Simon Guggenheim Memorial Fellowship (2016), William H. Johnson Prize (2014)
- Website: www.deannabowen.ca

Deanna Bowen (born November 5, 1969) is an interdisciplinary artist whose practice includes films, video installations, performances, drawing, sculpture and photography. Her work addresses issues of trauma and memory through an investigation of personal and official histories related to slavery, migration, civil rights, and white supremacy in Canada and the United States. Bowen is a dual citizen of the US and Canada. She lives and works in Montreal.

== Early life and education ==
Bowen was born in Oakland, California and is the descendant of African Americans who migrated north to Canada, from Alabama and Kentucky (via Oklahoma and Kansas) in the early twentieth century. In 1909, her great-grandparents helped found Amber Valley, one of four Black immigrant settlements in Alberta. She was raised in Vancouver by her mother and grandparents, where she later completed a Diploma of Fine Art from Emily Carr University of Art and Design in 1994. After moving to Toronto, she received her Masters in Visual Studies from the University of Toronto in 2008.

== Career ==
Bowen first became known for her single-channel video works exploring issues of family, race, gender, and sexuality, including milk-fed (1997), "an astounding balance of conceptual clarity and emotional power," sadomasochism (1998), and Deutschland (2000). She made her first dual-channel video work, Grist, in 2002, followed by two multi-media video installations Gospel (2008) and Shadow on the Prairie (2009), presented together in the exhibition, Stories to pass on..., which toured several museums across Canada between 2009 and 2012.

In 2010, Bowen produced the video, sum of the parts: what can be named, in which she delivers a highly detailed oral history of slavery and migration as experienced by her family. Specially commissioned by Vtape, this video was screened at the Kassel Documentary Film & Video Festival (2011) and Oberhausen Film Festival (2012), and in 2012, curator Srimoyee Mitra selected it for inclusion in Project 35_Vol. 2, an international touring exhibition produced by Independent Curators International.

To commemorate the 25th anniversary of the Images Festival of Independent Film, Video & New Media in 2012, Bowen produced The Paul Good Papers, an interdisciplinary installation/performance work co-commissioned by Images and Gallery 44. The Paul Good Papers was installed at Gallery 44 and featured video, archival materials, performance, performance documentation, as well as audio/sound sculpture. From April 5 to April 21, 2012, Bowen and actor Russell Bennett staged daily performances based on an audio-recorded interview between U.S. journalist Paul Good and Ku Klux Klan Imperial Wizard Robert Shelton. The exhibit also included the premiere presentation of a 24-minute looping video projection focused on Good's recording of the 1964 Civil Rights Movement campaign to integrate high schools in Notasulga, Alabama.

Addressing many of the recurring themes in her autobiographical, process-driven practice, Bowen's expansive solo exhibition, Invisible Empires, was exhibited at The Art Gallery of York University in 2013. Featuring Ku Klux Klan archival material including photographs and documents, as well as replicas of Klan banners and robes, the exhibition received a fair amount of media attention as many considered the work to be controversial, although Bowen was clear on the goals of the work:

Most people build on this idea of Canada being a haven for blacks—the whole Underground Railroad and all of that history, which is real, but there are also these other histories about black treatment in Canada that don’t get brought forward.

In 2015, she extended her exploration of these issues to a U.S. context, investigating the Klan's history in Pennsylvania in work on display in the exhibition Traces in the Dark at the Institute of Contemporary Art, Philadelphia.

Throughout her career, Bowen has given guest lectures and presented artist talks internationally. In August 2015, she was a featured artist representing Canada at the Creative Time Summit at the 56th Venice Biennale - All The World’s Futures, curated by Okwui Enwezor. Bowen has also worked for a number of arts organizations in Toronto, including Liaison of Independent Filmmakers Of Toronto, InterAccess, Images Festival and A Space Gallery. She taught studio and video art in the Department of Arts, Culture & Media at the University of Toronto Scarborough from 2007 to 2014. Along with sessional teaching at Guelph and Ryerson University, Bowen was Faculty Advisor for the MFAIA-VT in Interdisciplinary Art program at Goddard College from 2017 to 2020. Bowen joined Concordia University's Studio Arts Department as an Assistant Professor in Intersectional Feminist and Decolonial 2D-4D Image Making in 2020.

== Exhibitions ==
Bowen first exhibited her work in the 1990s; early group exhibitions include shows at A Space Gallery in Toronto in 1997, and at Forest City Gallery in London, Ontario in 1999. Her first solo exhibition, Home, was held in 1994 at Pitt Gallery in Vancouver, British Columbia. Her work has also been included in group exhibitions at the Thames Art Gallery (2006), the Nasher Museum of Art at Duke University, Durham, North Carolina (2011), the Canadian Museum of Civilization at Pier 21 in Halifax, Nova Scotia (2013), the McMaster Museum of Art in Hamilton, Ontario (2014), the Institute of Contemporary Art at the University of Pennsylvania in Philadelphia, Pennsylvania (2015), the MacLaren Art Centre (2016), the Art Museum of at the University of Toronto (2016); and the Art Gallery of Windsor, the Kitchener-Waterloo Art Gallery (2017), and the Banff Centre for Arts and Creativity (2017).

Major solo exhibitions include The Paul Good Papers, a 2012 solo exhibition/residency at Gallery 44 in Toronto, Ontario, in partnership with the Images Festival, Invisible Empires at the Art Gallery of York University in 2013, ~~On Trial~~ The Long Doorway at Mercer Union (2017), and God of Gods: A Canadian Play (2019) at the Justina M. Barnicke Gallery at Hart House in Toronto. Her films have screened at Kassel Documentary Film & Video Festival (2011) and Oberhausen Film Festival (2012). Black Drones in the Hive solo touring exhibition (2023).

== Recognition ==
Bowen has received numerous grants and awards over the course of her career, most notably from the B.C. Cultural Services, Toronto Arts Council, Ontario Arts Council, Telefilm, and Canada Council. She is a 2016 Guggenheim Fellow and was the recipient of the 2014 William H. Johnson Prize, an annual award for early career African American artists. She was also awarded project sponsorship from Partners in Art for her 2013 solo exhibition, Invisible Empires at the Art Gallery of York University, and for her 2017 solo exhibition, ~~On Trial~~ The Long Doorway at Mercer Union.

Bowen is one of 12 Canadian winners of major international research awards in 2016 featured in the Universities Canada publication Canadian excellence, Global recognition: Celebrating recent Canadian winners of major international research awards.

Bowen was awarded a 2017 Canada Council New Chapter Grant for Other Places: Reflections on Media Arts in Canada, an anthology she edited which was published by Media Arts Network of Ontario in 2019.

In 2020, Bowen was named one of eight winners of the Governor General's Awards in Visual and Media Arts, an annual award for outstanding contributions to Canadian creativity. The award is administered by the Canada Council for the Arts and juried by accomplished peers.

Bowen won the $50,000 Scotiabank Photography Award, Canada's largest prize for photography in 2021. In addition to the award, Bowen will receive a solo exhibition with the Scotiabank Contact Photography Festival and an associated publication produced by Steidel.

== Collections ==
- McMaster Museum of Art, Hamilton, Ontario
- McEvoy Foundation for the Arts, San Francisco, California
- Burnaby Art Gallery, Burnaby, British Columbia
- Toronto Dominion Bank, Ontario
- Art Museum at the University of Toronto, Toronto, Ontario
- Van Pelt-Dietrich Library Center at University of Pennsylvania, Philadelphia, Pennsylvania
- Syracuse University, Syracuse, New York
- Thames Art Gallery, Chatham, Ontario
- Concordia University, Montreal, Quebec
- Wedge Curatorial Projects, Toronto, Ontario
- Vancouver Art Gallery, Vancouver, British Columbia
