= Indigenous Peoples Space =

Centre for First Nations, Inuit, and Métis located in Ottawa

Coordinates: 45.4230°N 75.6986°W

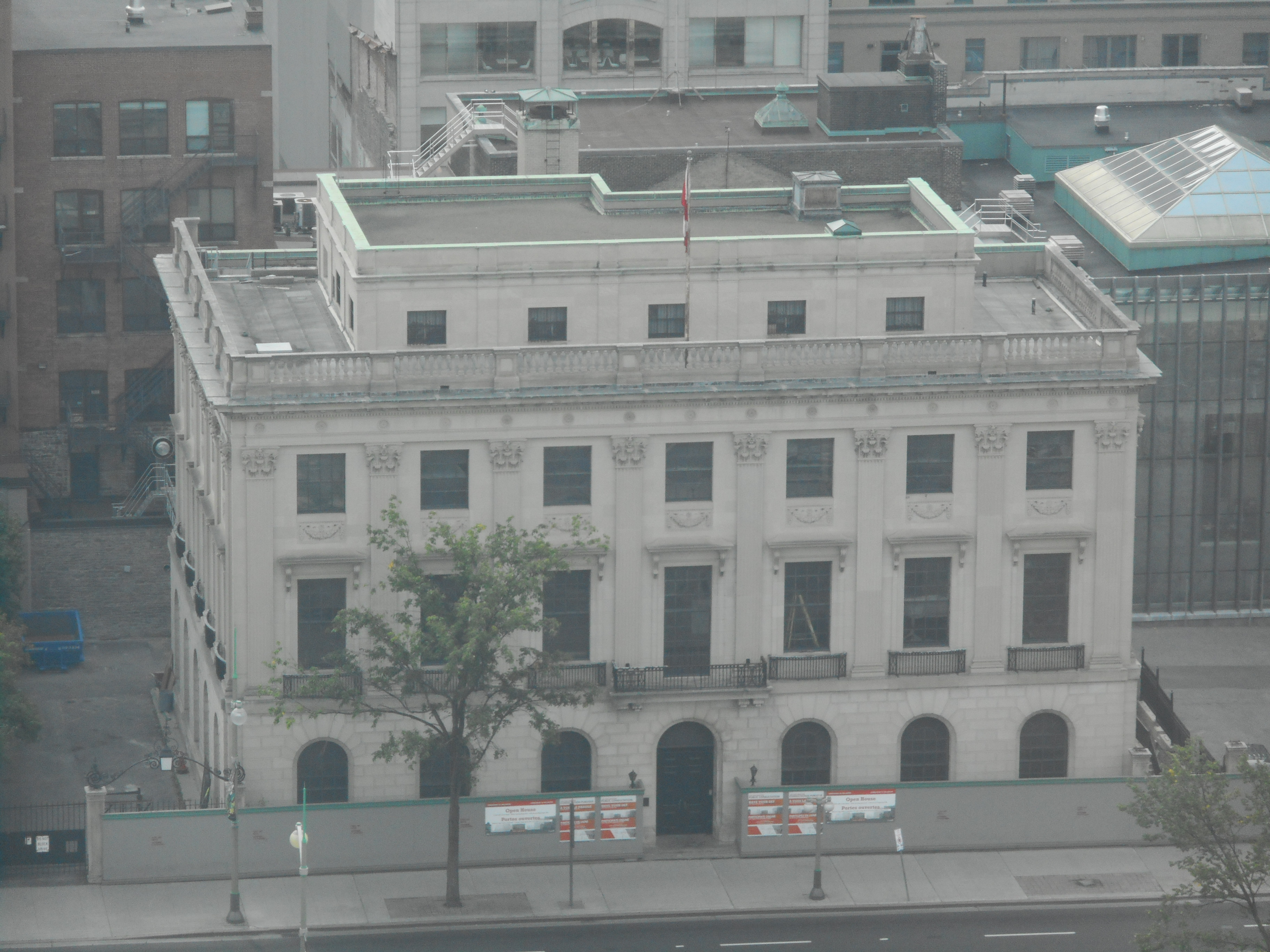
- 100 Wellington Street in 2016
- Interactive map of the Indigenous Peoples Space area
- Former names: US Embassy

General information
- Type: Office building
- Architectural style: Beaux-Arts
- Location: 100 Wellington Street, Ottawa, Ontario, Canada
- Completed: 1932
- Owner: Assembly of First Nations

The Indigenous Peoples Space is a building in Ottawa, Ontario, Canada, designated for the use of the First Nations, Inuit, and Métis peoples. The building is located at 100 Wellington Street in Block 2 of Canada's Parliamentary precinct, immediately south of Parliament Hill in downtown Ottawa. The current Beaux-Arts building on site was built in 1931 to house the first permanent United States Embassy in Canada, but was closed after a move to a new location in 1999. It would remain vacant for the next two decades.

In 2017, the building was designated to be revitalized as the Indigenous People's Space. Included with the 100 Wellington Street building is 119 Sparks Street, originally housing a bank, and a connecting space.

== Architecture and design ==
The building's design, by American architect Cass Gilbert, reflects the Beaux-Arts classical style, and is reflective of typical United States government architecture of the early 1930s. Consisting of three storeys, the building's "... rectilinear footprint, flat roof, and symmetrical composition centred on the main entrance of the principal elevation… possesses a simple, imposing cube-like massing". The spatial hierarchy of the building maintains the Beaux-Arts characteristics of grand circulation spaces that lead to principal offices, while corridors of secondary and tertiary importance lead to other office and support spaces. The building is finished in Indiana Limestone, and features finely carved classical details on its principal facades, while Vermont marble, and floor-to-ceiling oak panels fashion the interior spaces. The building fits "...harmoniously within a row of similarly scaled and finished buildings", all of which face the Parliamentary Precinct. On January 8, 1985, the building was recognized by the Government of Canada as a Classified Federal Heritage Building and is listed on the Canadian Register of Historic Places.

The adaptive reuse of the original building is currently being undertaken by three Indigenous architectural firms (David T. Fortin Architect, Smoke Architecture, and Wanda Dalla Costa Architects) to incorporate Indigenous values and teachings into an outer shell-design that is reflective of its people.

== History ==
=== US Embassy ===
The site was first developed in 1931 to become the first permanent home of the United States Embassy. Located directly across Parliament Hill, the embassy was opened in 1934, and thus marked the first foreign mission in Ottawa. Though Canada was still a part of the British Commonwealth, the erection of the foreign mission in the nation's capital served as a "...benchmark in Canada's gradual assumption of sovereignty over its own foreign affairs". Then Prime Minister, Mackenzie King, assured the United States that Canada would be an autonomous nation by the time the embassy was planned for completion in 1932. Canada would receive its independence through the Statute of Westminster in 1931, and the building was first opened 1932 as an American Legation, and in 1934 as a full embassy. Its construction also signified the rise of power, and establishment of the United States as a global leader, as the building was part of a series of newly constructed embassies by the United States government around the world.

After the United States Embassy relocated to a site west of Parliament Hill 1999, the building became the property of the Government of Canada. The building was left vacant.

=== Proposals for new use ===
In 2001, Prime Minister Jean Chrétien's Liberal Government put forward the intent to transform the former embassy into a National Portrait Gallery, an effort to display some of the over 20,000 portrait paintings and photographs housed within the National Archives of Canada. However, when the Conservative government took power in 2006, the project was cancelled, and instead "...a national competition for private sector bidders to house the portraits in one of nine cities" was launched in November 2007. The following year, the competition was cancelled due to none of the bids meeting the government's expectations.

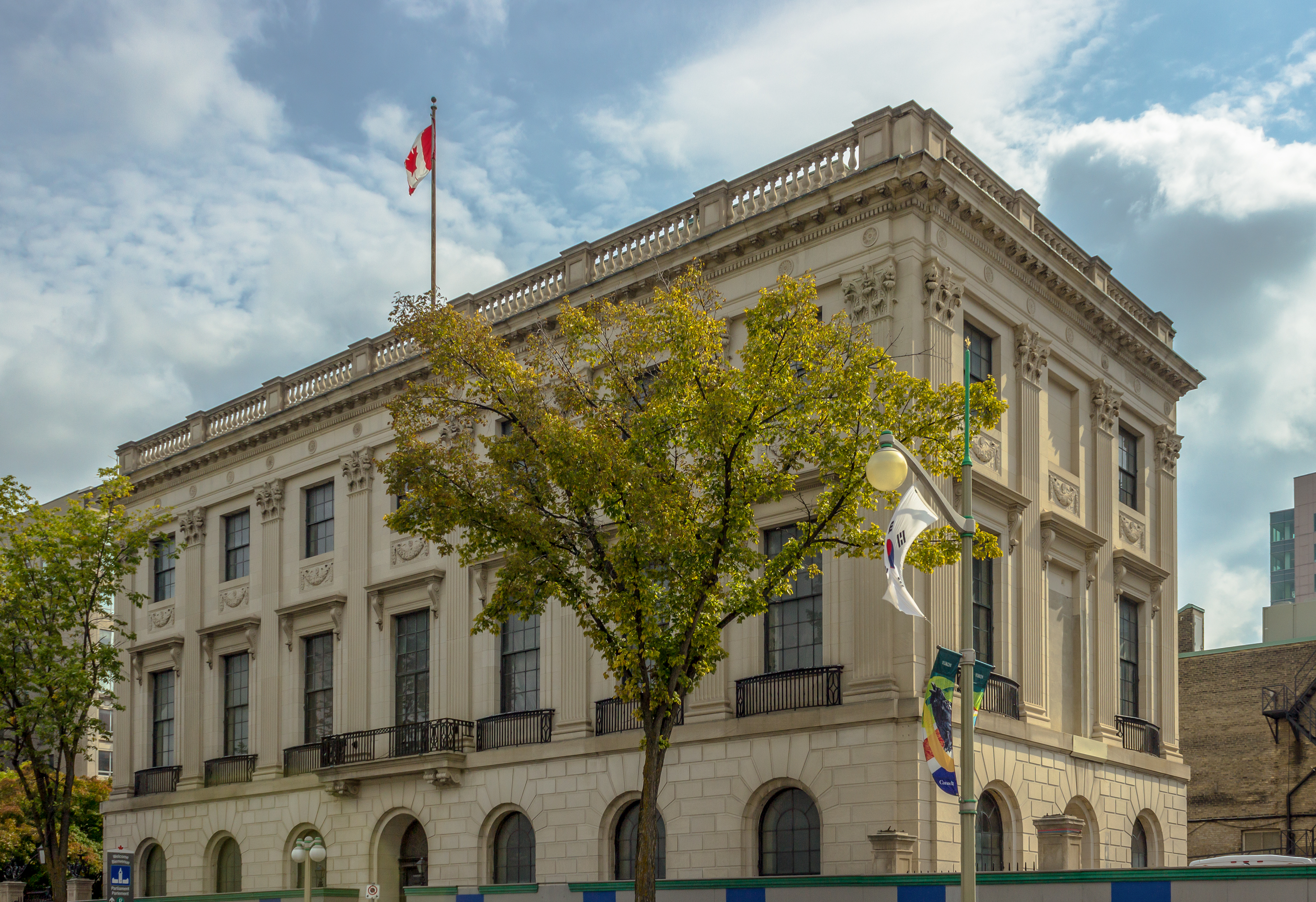
100 Wellington Street in 2014

In the summer of 2016, an online survey, and public consultations were conducted to determine the future use of 100 Wellington. Over 7,000 Canadian respondents completed the survey, with the final results revealing that the "Canada House" proposal, to house contemporary and historic Canadian artefacts, had the most support, while an art gallery and Indigenous cultural centre placed second and third respectively.

=== Dedication to Indigenous Peoples ===
On National Indigenous Peoples Day in 2017, Prime Minister Justin Trudeau announced the former United States Embassy would become an Indigenous Peoples Space, and represent the cultures and histories of the three indigenous groups of Canada; First Nations, Inuit, and Métis.

The announcement of the dedication of 100 Wellington to the Indigenous Peoples was met with criticism by the Indigenous Task Force, part of the Royal Architectural Institute of Canada, made up of 30 Indigenous architects, students, interns, and academics. The designation of the former embassy was critiqued as not a culturally appropriate space for an Indigenous cultural centre, as the building's "...classical revival architecture style is most identified with colonization, "echoing structures of European authority".

After the designation of space to the Assembly of First Nations, Inuit, and Métis Nations, the Algonquin Anishinabeg Nation protested for equal partnership of the space as the location sits on the unceded territory of the Algonquin Nation. After repeated and rejected requests to the Canadian government, the Nation's Grand Chief, Verna Polson, commenced a hunger and water strike in the summer of 2019, blocking the main entrance of the 100 Wellington building. After 41 hours, the federal government granted the Algonquin Nation as a fourth partner to the project.

The short-term vision of the Indigenous Peoples Space will provide the opportunity for engagement between the Indigenous partners, and peoples to determine the future design of the space. On its first floor, the building currently houses a gallery of contemporary Indigenous artefacts that offer non-Indigenous peoples an honest representation of Indigenous culture and society in the 21st century. The second floor currently holds offices and conference rooms. The short-term use of the building is expected "...to last until spring 2022, when the design of the building for the long-term will be finalized".
