= Michel Lambeth =

Canadian photographer (1923–1977)

- Born: Thomas Henry Lambeth; April 21, 1923; Toronto, Ontario
- Died: April 9, 1977 (aged 53); Toronto, Ontario
- Known for: Photographic study of Toronto

Michel Lambeth (April 21, 1923 – April 09, 1977) was a Canadian photographer who made an in-depth photographic study of Toronto during the 1950s and was one of the country's leading photo-journalists during the 1960s.

== Biography ==
Thomas Henry Lambeth was born in Toronto in 1923. After serving in the Canadian Armed Forces (1941–1944), he studied art in London and Paris (where he changed his name to "Michel"). In 1952, he returned to Canada as an artist with a wife and an as yet undetermined path in making art. He worked at a day job as a clerk at City Hall in Toronto and experimented with film at night.

In 1955, he took up photography with a Rolleiflex (2¼ sq. format) camera and inspired by Toronto's Kensington and St. Lawrence Market districts, began an intensive study of the vibrant street life of Toronto. From 1956 to 1958, he worked with a Leica (35 mm) camera. His heroes in photography were individuals such as Henri Cartier-Bresson and Brassai, and like them he sought to discover "the decisive moment" (as Cartier-Bresson called it in his landmark 1952 book, The Decisive Moment) in his subjects through his camera. His photographic work was described as European in style, conveying a human interest story, compassionately shown and told.

In 1972, he said about his work:

"After six years in Europe, returning to Canada turned me back to the streets of Toronto where I had grown up. The first images were extremely nostalgic. I photographed the children and grandchildren of the Macedonians, the Greeks, the English, the Irish, the Scottish, who had come to Toronto — just as my father did — about 1910. I photographed my coequals as though one day they would suddenly disappear — as I had, momentarily — to war in Europe or elsewhere."

At the same time, he continued writing fiction. In 1959, he left his job working for the city and became a freelance photojournalist full-time. He was published in Life, Star Weekly and Maclean's, as well as becoming a reviewer for magazines. He also began in 1960 photographing the Isaacs Group: artists affiliated with the Isaacs Gallery such as Michael Snow.

In 1962 to 1964, he photographed the community of the parish of St. Nil, Gaspé, Quebec, for Star Weekly, which did not publish the photos as they were deemed too grim and critical. The negatives were acquired later by the National Film Board's Still Photography Division. In 1965, Lambeth had a solo exhibition at the Isaacs Gallery. In 1967, he published a collection of historical photographs which turned out to be the work of Toronto City photographer Arthur Goss in his book, Made in Canada. In 1968, although the Star Weekly ceased publication, his work was included in group shows in the U.S.A. and France and in 1969, he was given a solo show at the National Film Board (today the Canadian Photography Institute at the National Gallery of Canada).

In 1972, he reacted to the hiring of an American chief curator at the Art Gallery of Ontario and, along with others, chained himself to office furniture in the premises then occupied by the gallery to gain attention in the media. In 1973, he worked for the Toronto Free Theatre as an associate artist but the fee was meagre. He continued his involvement in cultural politics, often against the Art Gallery of Ontario, protesting the Henry Moore Sculpture Centre, and a photography show organized by the Extension department, as well as protesting the National Film Board's Bicentennial project. In 1976, he found himself unable to find work and went on social assistance.

== Legacy ==
Lambeth died in 1977, leaving behind an archive of "thousands of negatives".

After his death, the National Film Board's Gallery in Ottawa hosted a tribute to his work. A write-up in The Ottawa Citizen called Lambeth "an independent photographer in Canada before that was acceptable or even respectable." The Ottawa Journal wrote that "Lambeth produced a sensitive social document of the lives of working class people, revealing their inner strength and dignity."

Library and Archives Canada hosted a major retrospective in 1986, Michel Lambeth: Photographer, curated by Michael Torosian. In celebration of the show, in 1987, Michael Torosian published the limited edition book Michel Lambeth: The Confessions of a Tree Taster, a memoir by Lambeth of his youth, his discovery of Europe, love and art. In 1989, Maia-Mari Sutnik for the Art Gallery of Ontario curated a large overview of his work as well as the accompanying catalogue, Michel Lambeth: Photographer with tributes by John Boyle, James Reaney, Joyce Wieland, and Avrom Isaacs. To celebrate the key role of the Isaacs Gallery and the artists associated with Avrom Isaacs and as part of a larger show titled Isaacs Seen consisting of four tributes to Isaacs in partnership with the University of Toronto Art Centre, Hart House (Justina M. Barnicke Art Gallery), and the Textile Museum of Canada, the Art Gallery of Ontario did an adjunct two-person show in 2005 titled Isaacs Seen: Two on the Scene of Michel Lambeth and Tess Taconis.

In 2014, Canada Post released seven stamps honouring master photographers. Among them was Michel Lambeth's photograph of St. Joseph's Convent School taken in 1960.
