= Ian Carr-Harris =

Canadian artist

- Born: April 12, 1941 (age 85); Victoria, British Columbia, Canada
- Education: Queen's University at Kingston (BA); University of Toronto (BLS); Ontario College of Art (AOCA)
- Known for: Sculpture, installation art
- Awards: 2007 Governor General's Award in Visual and Media Arts

Ian Carr-Harris (born April 12, 1941) is a Toronto-based Canadian artist. In addition to exhibiting internationally, Carr-Harris is a professor emeritus at OCAD University.

== Life ==
Ian Carr-Harris was born in Victoria, British Columbia, in 1941. He graduated from the Ontario College of Art in 1971, after receiving a BA from Queen's University at Kingston and a BLS from the University of Toronto.

He is an artist, writer and educator. Major solo exhibitions of his work have taken place across Canada and abroad. His writings on art have been published in Canadian Art, Parachute, C Magazine and Vanguard, among others.

Carr-Harris has been on the faculty of OCAD University since the 1970s and was conferred emeritus status in 2015. He has received several grants from the Ontario Arts Council and the Canada Council, and is represented by the Susan Hobbs Gallery, Toronto.

He has represented Canada at the Biennale of Sydney (1990), Documenta 8 (1987) and with Liz Magor at the Venice Biennale (1984). He lives and works in Toronto, and is on the board of directors of the Centre for Contemporary Canadian Art.

In 2002, Ian Carr-Harris received the Victor Martyn Lynch-Staunton Award from the Canada Council. In 2007, he was awarded the Governor General's Award in Visual and Media Arts for artistic achievement. He is a member of the Royal Canadian Academy of Arts.

== Work ==
137 Tecumseth, 1994, wood, arborite, spotlight, lens, motor assembly

Primarily a sculptor and installation artist, Ian Carr-Harris' work investigates knowledge and ordering systems, often working with books and libraries, reflecting his early training and career as a librarian. In particular, his work reflects an interest in the intersections between memory and technology, often outdated technology, which was a recurrent motif of Canadian art in the 1970s. Art historian Mark Cheetham describes Carr-Harris' 1972 installation Nancy Higginson, 1949- as a key example of work at that time which posits viewers "as forgetful machines who must have [their] memories [their] sense of [themselves] as existing over time constantly restored." In Nancy Higginson, 1949- Carr-Harris uses the card catalogue, as a "primitive memory system", a textual archive in which a photograph seems out of place.

In his work Carr-Harris often uses common materials and objects, such as tables and cabinets, which are "domestic in scale, almost banal in appearance, [that] initially present their information through texts." Typical of his work in the 1970s and 1980s is a matter-of-fact revealing of the basic elements of the work to the viewer. Whereas his earlier works show the elements of the entire piece as banal, with text as the only key to the overall work, by the 1990s his work begins to use light projections and his 1994 installation 137 Tecumseth is one of several which artificially "re-enact the passage of sunlight through time across a particular space."
