= Isabelle Hayeur =

Canadian visual artist (born 1969)

- Born: 1969 (age 56–57); Montreal, Canada
- Education: Université du Québec à Montréal (BA) (MA)
- Occupation: Photographer
- Known for: Environmental photography
- Website: isabelle-hayeur.com

Isabelle Hayeur (born 1969) is a Canadian visual artist known for her photographs and experimental videos. She has also created site-specific installations, public art commissions and photography books. Her work critically examines environmental issues, urban development, suburban sprawl, and social conditions, often blending documentary and manipulated imagery to evoke alienation, loss, and resistance.

== Early life and education ==
Isabelle Hayeur was born in Montreal, Canada, in 1969. Hayeur obtained a Bachelor of Fine Arts degree in 1997 and a Master of Fine Arts degree in 2002, both from the Université du Québec à Montréal. She has lived and worked in Montreal for most of her life. Hayeur was raised in the suburb of Bois-des-Filion in Montreal, where she lived into her early 20s. During these years, Hayeur experienced feelings of alienation and dislocation that she believes to accompany suburban living. Hayeur's suburban upbringing is highly influential to her works, where she frequently confronts the issue of land exploitation in urban planning. Hayeur currently resides in the Rawdon Municipality, located on the Ouareau River in southwestern Quebec, Canada.

== Artistic practice ==
Hayeur’s art practice examines environmental transformation, urban development, suburban expansion, and social conditions, often combining documentary observation with constructed or altered imagery. Hayeur’s photo-based work has been described as challenging the presumed objectivity of documentary photography through processes of construction and digital manipulation, including the use of image-editing software.

In her early work from the late 1990s, Hayeur produced panoramic photographs of expansive landscapes that she digitally composites by incorporating elements from multiple locations. These constructed images go beyond conventional documentary photography to reveal environmental conditions, conceptual tensions, and the mediated nature of our perceptions of place.

In the mid-2000s, Hayeur examined suburban landscapes through photomontage. In Model Homes (2004–2007), she manipulated images of prefabricated houses characterized by standardized architectural features. By digitally placing these structures within varied or incongruous settings, the series addresses themes of uniformity, placelessness, and the expansion of suburban development into rural areas.

In the related series Excavations (2005–2007), she merged ground-level views of suburban homes with images of construction sites, revealing layers of topsoil removal and underlying geological strata. These works juxtapose built environments with their natural foundations, emphasizing processes of land transformation and erasure.

Beginning in 2008, she developed the ongoing underwater photography series Underworlds / Troubled Waters. Using underwater cameras in polluted or altered aquatic environments, including areas near New Jersey’s Chemical Coast and Staten Island, she documents ecosystems affected by low oxygen levels and human activity. The images often contrast visual qualities associated with beauty and abstraction with evidence of ecological degradation, drawing attention to connections between submerged environments and surface conditions.

More recent projects reflect a shift toward a more direct documentary approach. These include bodies of work focused on the American West (Desert Shores, Fault Line, Seared Horizons), wildfire-affected landscapes (Wild Times, Land of Ashes), civic protest and dissent (Divided We Stand, The Deplorables / Les édentés), industrial agriculture (Rumination), and border regions (Borderlands), which addresses migration, border infrastructure, and associated social tensions. Across these projects, her practice continues to engage with themes of ecological change, contested spaces, and the social and political dimensions of landscape.

=== Video art ===
Hayeur also works in video, often exploring themes that parallel those in her photographic practice, including environmental transformation, urban development, suburban sprawl, ecological degradation, and social conditions. Notable works include Vertige (2000), which immerses the viewer in a disorienting plunge over an open-pit mine landscape; Losing Ground (2009), which documents rapidly changing territories to confront processes of land erosion and homogenization; and Adrift (2019), filmed in the polluted waters of the Staten Island boat graveyard, capturing decaying vessels in a toxic environment. Her video practice frequently blends documentary observation with poetic or constructed approaches to examine liminal spaces, human impact on landscapes, and questions of loss and resistance.

Site-specific installations

Between 2002 and 2015, Hayeur created several site-specific video installations and public art projects that extended her exploration of environmental and urban themes into architectural and public spaces. These works often used video projection onto buildings or urban structures to engage directly with their physical and social contexts. Notable examples include Fire with Fire (2010), a projection simulating flames on a heritage building in Vancouver’s Downtown Eastside during the Cultural Olympiad, and Issue (2004), a video installation presented in an abandoned waste incinerator in Montreal. Other projects from this period, such as Murs aveugles (2014) similarly addressed issues of urban transformation, social tensions, and place-based memory through context-responsive interventions.

== Themes ==
=== Urban sprawl ===
Her works examine the environmental consequences of rapid, large-scale residential and commercial development, focusing on the tension between ongoing urbanization and the disappearance or alteration of natural and agricultural landscapes. It addresses how modern housing development can overlook the specific ecological needs of the land.

=== Industrialization ===
Her practice and work explores how human activities such as construction, infrastructure development, and resource extraction transform natural territories, often resulting in spaces that appear dehumanized. Composite images created by combining elements from different locations question the objectivity traditionally associated with documentary photography.

=== Ecotopia ===
Ecotopia is derived from the subgenre Ecotopian fiction. Ecotopian fiction is derived from the synthesis of utopian and dystopian worlds. In 2012, Hayeur participated in a group exhibition called Ecotopia. Here, Hayeur and her contemporaries presented works that show the coexistence of rural and urban, natural and manufactured, protection and exploitation, conservation and destruction, nostalgia and futuristic vision, to challenge the notion that modernity equals progress. Hayeur's contribution was footage from her 2012 video, Losing Ground. Hayeur's video evokes themes of Ecotopia as it shows a blend of industrial architecture amongst environmental decay and erosion.

=== Capitalism ===
Hayeur criticizes capitalism in her photographs and exhibitions. She denounces society's consumerist mindset with the extreme accumulation of goods and money as well as the giant infrastructure projects that destroy the environment.

Civic resistance and social tensions

Her recent work engages with political dissent, civic protest, migration dynamics, and contested border regions. It documents social tensions, infrastructure related to borders and surveillance, and expressions of resistance within landscapes marked by human conflict and displacement.

== Collaborations ==
In 2004, Hayeur was a part of a 10-month field study conducted by Jude Leclerc and Frederic Gosselin, researchers in the Department of Psychology at the University of Montreal. Leclerc and Gosselin examined the under-researched cognitive problem solving process in a contemporary visual arts practice. Hayeur was the test subject and data on her creative processes was collected through multiple 30-60 minute interviews and site visits to her workspace. The study revealed that within the creative realm, the cognition of a professional artist is on part with the cognition of a scientist.

== Solo exhibitions ==
- Contrast and indifference, Canadian Cultural Centre (Paris, France), 2026
- Wild Times, Vernon Public Art Gallery (Vernon, Canada) 2025
- Isabelle Hayeur : Desert Shores, Works from the permanent collection, National Gallery of Canada (Ottawa, Canada) 2023
- Dépayser, Musée d'art de Joliette (Joliette, Canada) 2017
- Fifty Years of Collecting Photographs: The Extended Moment, National Gallery of Canada (Ottawa, Canada) 2018
- Corps étranger, Art Gallery of Windsor, (Windsor, Canada) 2017
- The Edge of the Earth: Climate Change in Photography and Video, Ryerson Image Centre (Toronto, Canada) 2016
- 10 years gone, New Orleans Museum of Art (New Orleans, United States) 2015
- Looking Forward, The Montreal Biennial, Musée d'art contemporain de Montréal (Montreal, Canada) 2014
- Death in absentia, Pierogi Gallery (Brooklyn, United States) 2013
- Placemakers, Bemis Center for Contemporary Arts (Omaha, United States) 2012
- Ecologies: A Song for Our Planet, Montreal Museum of Fine arts (Montreal, Canada) 2010
- Silverstein Photography Annual (SPA), Bruce Silverstein (New York, United States) 2008
- Loaded Landscapes, Museum of Contemporary Photography (Chicago, United States) 2007
- Inhabiting: the works of Isabelle Hayeur, Southern Alberta Art Gallery (Lethbridge, Canada), Musée National des Beaux-arts du Québec (Quebec City, Canada), Oakville Galleries (Oakville, Canada), St-Mary's University Art Gallery (Halifax, Canada) 2006 – 2007
- Urban Territories, Musée d'art contemporain de Montréal (Montreal, Canada), Oakville Galleries (Oakville, Canada) 2006
- Destinations, Laura Heon curator, Massachusetts Museum of Contemporary Art (North Adams, United States) 2004

== Awards ==
- The Prefix Prize (2025)
- Prix OFQJ, Champ Libre, Le Fresnoy (2004)
- Prix Contact For emerging photography artist (2001)
- Prix du Conseil des arts et des lettres du Québec, Artiste de l'année dans Lanaudière (2022)
- The Hnatyshyn Foundation mid-career award (2021)
- The Duke and Duchess of York Prize in Photography (2019)
