= Arnaud Maggs =

- Born: May 5, 1926; Montreal, Quebec
- Died: November 17, 2012 (aged 86); Toronto, Ontario, Canada
- Known for: photographer, conceptual artist
- Spouse: Spring Hurlbut
- Awards: Canada Council’s Victor Martyn Lynch-Staunton Award (1984); Gershon Iskowitz Prize (1991); Governor General's Award in Visual and Media Arts for Lifetime Achievement (2006); Scotiabank Photography Award (2012)

Arnaud Maggs (May 5, 1926 – November 17, 2012) was a Canadian artist and photographer. Born in Montreal, Maggs is best known for stark portraits arranged in grid-like arrangements, which illustrate his interest in systems of identification and classification.

After training and working as a graphic designer, Maggs turned to commercial photography in the 1960s. Beginning in 1967, he produced editorial fashion mages and portraiture for several Canadian magazines such as Maclean's, Chatelaine, Saturday Night, Canadian Business, and Toronto Life. At the age of 47, Maggs decided to become a visual artist concentrating on photography and conceptualism and focusing on such things as death notices and tags documenting child labour in French textile factories.

== Works ==
Joseph Beuys: 100 Profile Views, Düsseldorf, 21.10.80 (detail), 1980

Maggs's explorations of the grid, portraiture, and collecting informed his investigations into such themes as systems and classification, time, memory, and death. Characteristic of Maggs' early work are his black-and-white portraits taken from the front, side and back, and presented in grid formation. Maggs' use of the grid was influenced by his background in graphic design as well as his interest in Conceptual art. By including numerous similar photos in one work, Maggs invoked the idea of duration, inviting viewers to compare changes in images over time. In his series 48 Views, 1981-1982, he used this grid style to portray cultural figures including Yousuf Karsh, Jane Jacobs and Michael Snow.

The most famous of his grid works were his internationally acclaimed portraits of Joseph Beuys, Joseph Beuys: 100 Frontal Views, Düsseldorf, 21.10.80 and Joseph Beuys: 100 Profile Views, Düsseldorf, 21.10.80. Created in Beuys' Düsseldorf home in 1980, the images appear to be identical, but are 200 different photographs of Beuys attempting to sit completely still. The same year, Maggs photographed André Kertész, then 86, in his André Kertész, 144 Views. His grid work "fascinated, disturbed and exerted tremendous influence in art and magazine circles," wrote Martha Langford in 2010.

By the mid-1980s, Maggs shifted away from portraiture and turned his focus to typography, which had been a prominent aspect of his work as a graphic designer. He replaced the human head with number- and letterforms in his photography and paintings, although he displayed an ongoing fascination with shape, scale, and classification.

Maggs's concern for classification extended to work he made of historical documents such as the address book of Eugène Atget, rare books and ephemera, and collections of miscellany. He was also fascinated with the history of photography.

Often examining existing systems of identification and classification in his works, Maggs developed his own classification scheme in Hotel Series, 1991. He photographed more than 300 vertical hotel signs in Paris, from which he compiled a selection of 165 signs to be published in a book designed by graphic designer and typographer Ed Cleary (1950–1994) and published by Art Metropole (Toronto) and Presentation House (Vancouver) in 1993. Maggs arranged the photographs in the book by lettering style so that each page contains five similar hotel signs.

Since the late 1970s, Maggs has been the subject of numerous retrospectives, solo exhibitions and group shows across the country and world-wide. Several shows were especially notable in Canada. In 1999, a survey exhibition of Maggs's work titled Arnaud Maggs: Works 1976-1997 was organized by curator Philip Monk for Toronto's The Power Plant. In 2006, the Robert McLaughlin Gallery in Oshawa; Gallery One One One, School of Art, University of Manitoba, Winnipeg; and McMaster Museum of Art, Hamilton organized Arnaud Maggs: Nomenclature, curated by Linda Jansma. The show subsequently travelled to the Musée d'art contemporain in Montreal. In 2012, the National Gallery of Canada gave him a retrospective titled Arnaud Maggs: Identification. In the United States, he was included in Special Collections: The Photographic Order from Pop to Now organized by Charles Stainback and toured by the International Centre of Photography in New York (1992).

His work is in many public collections including the National Gallery of Canada, Art Gallery of Nova Scotia, Art Gallery of Hamilton, Vancouver Art Gallery, Art Gallery of Ontario, Art Gallery of Alberta, Winnipeg Art Gallery, Montreal Museum of Fine Arts, the Robert McLaughlin Gallery, Oshawa, McMaster Museum of Art, and the Portland Art Museum, Oregon. Arnaud Maggs is represented by Susan Hobbs Gallery in Toronto.

== Awards ==
In 1984, Maggs was given the Canada Council's Victor Martyn Lynch-Staunton Award. He received the Gershon Iskowitz Prize in 1991 and in 1992, the Toronto Arts Award. In 2006, Maggs was awarded the Governor General's Award in Visual and Media Arts. In 2012, Maggs was awarded the Scotiabank Photography Award.

== Death and legacy ==
Arnaud Maggs died of cancer in Toronto on November 17, 2012. In 2013, an exhibition titled the Scotiabank Photography Award: Arnaud Maggs was held at the Ryerson Image Centre in Toronto. It featured a selection of work curated by the artist during his final months.

Maia-Mari Sutnik of the Art Gallery of Ontario who had been invited by Paris Photo to curate an exhibition, curated Performance Propositions, featuring Arnaud Maggs's autobiographical series, After Nadar (2012) in dialogue with selected original press prints of the 1930s from the Art Gallery of Ontario's collection, held at the Grand Palais, during Paris Photo in November 2013. The show was the exhibition's centrepiece, and in it, Maggs took the role of Nadar's 1854–1855 series of mime Jean-Charles Deburau as Pierrot in nine photographs including an announcement of someone's death. As Sutnik observed, Maggs' performance in his own studio in these photographs, not only concerned the history of photography but, knowing that he was about to die, announced his own forthcoming death. She called them "poignant".

A postage stamp depicting Magg's photograph of Yousuf Karsh was issued on March 22, 2013, by Canada Post as part of their Canadian Photography series.

A documentary film about Maggs and his partner of 25 years, Spring Hurlbut, Spring and Arnaud, premiered at 2013 Hot Docs Film Festival. His fonds is at the City of Toronto Archives number 1598.
