= Scotiabank Photography Award =

Photography award

The Scotiabank Photography Award is a CA$50,000 (equivalent to $62,960 in 2025) annual Canadian photography award. Two runners-up each receive CA$10,000 (equivalent to $12,592 in 2025). In addition to the cash prize, the prize consists of a solo-exhibition of their work and the publication of a book about the work. It is intended to support a Canadian mid-to-late career lens-based artists, aiming to take that career to a higher level of national and international recognition. The award was co-founded in 2010 by Canadian photographer Edward Burtynsky and Jane Nokes. The longlist is announced in January and the short list is announced in March. The winner is announced in early May during the Scotiabank Contact Photography Festival.

== Recipients ==
Year	Winner	Region
2011	Lynne Cohen	Quebec and Ontario
2012	Arnaud Maggs	Ontario
2013	Stan Douglas	British Columbia
2014	Mark Ruwedel	British Columbia
2015	Angela Grauerholz	Quebec
2016	Suzy Lake	Ontario
2017	Shelley Niro	Ontario
2018	Moyra Davey	Ontario
2019	Stephen Waddell	Vancouver, British Columbia
2020	Dana Claxton	
2021	Deanna Bowen	
2022	Jin-me Yoon	Vancouver, British Columbia
2023	Ken Lum	
2024	Clara Gutsche	
2025	Dawit L. Petros	
2026	Karen Stentaford	
