= Tom Dean (artist) =

Canadian artist (born 1947)

- Born: November 20, 1947 (age 78); Markdale, Ontario, Canada
- Education: visual art at Sir George Williams University (now Concordia University, Montreal) (1960s)
- Known for: multimedia and multidisciplinary artist

Tom Dean (born 1947) is a conceptual artist, known for his work in a diverse range of fields, among them sculpture, installation art and printmaking.

In 1999, he represented Canada at the Venice Biennale and in 2001, he received the Governor General's Award in Visual and Media Arts. The Globe and Mail in 2001 called him "the epitome of the artists' artist".

== Life and career ==
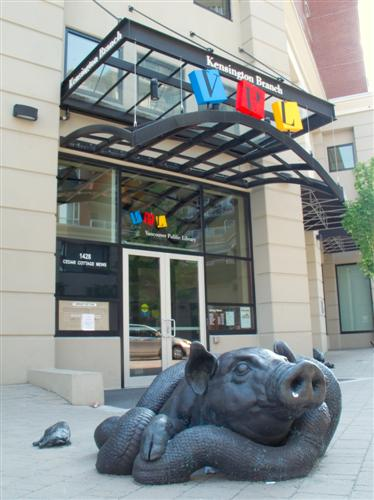
Peaceable Kingdom

Dean, born in Markdale, Ontario, attended Sir George Williams University (now Concordia University) in the 1960s. In Montreal, he co-founded one of Canada's first artist-run galleries, Véhicule Art Inc in 1972, in 1973 he co-founded Véhicule Press which published avant-garde art material in the English-language. From 1972 to 1974 Dean published Beaux Arts magazine with Stephen Lack. In 1976 Tom Dean moved to Toronto and from 1986 to 1989 he lived in New York. He now lives in Toronto. In 1992, he was an artist-in-residence at York University in Toronto.

In 1997, his sculptural project Excerpts from a Description of the Universe III (1987) made of wood, steel, cast iron, felt and porcelain, which was part of a larger series that attempted to describe the natural world, was purchased by the National Gallery of Canada.

In 1999, he remembered going to the National Gallery of Canada in Ottawa when he was a teenager and seeing a conceptual art show there. He said about it:

"I was just thrilled by it. It was an alternative, another way of thinking that made me say, 'Yes! This makes sense to me.' I can’t figure out nine-tenths of it, but it suited me from the beginning. It was a vehicle for obscure ways of thinking."

== Exhibitions and collections ==
His work was the subject of many solo exhibitions in Canada such as Ruins of the Floating Staircase (1978-1981), at Mercer Union, Toronto (1983); an exhibition of his drawings and sculptures at the Agnes Etherington Art Centre, Queen's University, Kingston (1990); Tom Dean, at the Art Gallery of York University, Toronto (1992); Tom Dean: Selected Works Past and Present (1999) at the Art Gallery of Ontario, Toronto; Tom Dean: Desire at the Toronto Sculpture Garden (2001); and Ruins (of The Floating Staircase) at the Art Gallery of University of Lethbridge (2002). In 2018, the Maclaren Art Centre in Barrie organized a show titled Tom Dean: Woodcuts. He has participated extensively in group shows in Montreal, New York, Toronto and abroad such as in 2010, Traffic: Conceptual Art In Canada 1965-1980, organized by the Justine Barnicke Gallery, University of Toronto and in 2013, in Continental Drift - Conceptual Art in Canada: The 1960s and 70s, an exhibition held at the Badischer Kunstverein in Karlsruhe (Baden Art Association), Germany.

His work is in the collection of the National Gallery of Canada, the Agnes Etherington Art Centre, the Morris and Helen Belkin Art Gallery at the University of British Columbia, as well as other major public collections. His work also has been commissioned by private developers such as his sculpture titled Peaceable Kingdom (2008), a work consisting of several large pieces located at King Edward Village in Vancouver.
