= Jin-me Yoon =

South Korean artist based in Canada (born 1960)

Jin-Me Yoon
- Born: 1960 (age 65–66); Seoul, South Korea
- Education: Concordia University (MFA, 1992)
- Known for: Contemporary artist
- Website: www.jin-meyoon.com

Jin-Me Yoon FRSC (born in 1960) is a South Korean-born internationally known Canadian artist who emigrated to Canada at the age of eight. She is a contemporary visual artist, utilizing performance, photography, and video to explore themes of identity as it relates to citizenship, culture, ethnicity, gender, history, nationhood, and sexuality.

Yoon's work is known for its use of humour and irony in its visual juxtapositions to the complex subject matter she examines. Her major works include Souvenirs of the Self (1991), a photographic series challenging stereotypical constructs of Canadian identity; A Group of Sixty-Seven (1996), consisting of sixty-seven portraits of Vancouver's Korean Canadian community standing in front of paintings by Lawren S. Harris and Emily Carr; and The Dreaming Collective Knows No History (2006), a video installation exploring the interrelationships of body, city and history.

She received her BA in Psychology from the University of British Columbia in 1985, a BFA from Emily Carr College of Art in 1990, and an MFA from Concordia University in 1992. Currently she lives and works in Vancouver, British Columbia, and teaches as a full professor at Simon Fraser University's School for the Contemporary Arts.

== Early life ==
Jin-me Yoon was born in Seoul, South Korea, to Chung Soon Chin (Jewel) and Myung Choong Yoon (Michael). Her father relocated to Vancouver in 1966 to study Pathology, and the rest of the Yoon family joined him in 1968, shortly after the Canadian government ended decades-long emigration restrictions that discriminated on the basis of race. Yoon attended primary school in East Vancouver. During that time, she became fascinated by the photographic images of consumerism she came across in National Geographic, Reader’s Digest, and luxury magazines that were available in the waiting room of her father's medical practice. When she was twelve, Yoon began using such images to produce collages.

In high school, she learned about art history during visits to temples in Korea and in the Time Life Library of Art that her parents collected, which introduced her to the work of Henri Matisse and Marcel Duchamp. Yoon enrolled at the University of British Columbia in 1978 but found the curriculum and its focus on Eurocentric, white, male narratives and creative production to be alienating. After graduating with a BA in Psychology, she earned a BFA from Emily Carr College of Art (now Emily Carr University of Art + Design) in Vancouver (1985–1990), which was followed by MFA studies at Montreal’s Concordia University.

== Work ==
Yoon's works often employ photography, video, and elements of performance to question constructions of identity within specific historical and social conditions. In 1991, the artist produced a work entitled Souvenirs of the Self, which explores the relationship between notions of self and the Other within dominant images of the Canadian landscape, most noticeably those shaped primarily by tourism. An installation created in 1998, between departure and arrival, marks Yoon's shift away from only using photographic images as outward markers of race. Using video and audio in departure, Yoon investigates "interior, consciousness forming structures such as language." The unconscious, memory, history, identity, place, and nationhood are important themes for the artist, whose project, Unbidden (2004), uses multiple-channel videos and photographs to allude to the psychic and physical conditions of the subject, particularly through migration, diasporic dispersal, and displacement related to war and other geo-political conditions.

Her work Long View (2017) blends photography and video to tackle themes of identity, place, history, and surveillance. The work records a performance by Yoon's family where they dig into the sand on Long Beach in Pacific Rim National Park Reserve. Turning Time (2022) was composed of eighteen suspended digital screens projecting a diverse cast of dancers performing their own interpretation of the Korean Crane highlighting themes of interconnectedness, diasporic subjects, the future and resilience.

Her more recent video work explores various cities, most notably in South Korea and Japan. Formally tipping the vertical city of skyscrapers and bipedal humans onto a horizontal plane, Yoon evokes subliminal and inchoate associations with both the past and the present. For viewers experiencing the work within the gallery there is an uncanny sense of a dream-like immersion in the phantasmagoria of late modernity.

In 2017, Yoon began to work with the Ssamzie Space in Seoul, South Korea, where she had a residency, to make her lens-based installations and develop aims in sympathy with The Korean Cultural Centre Canada (KCC) which, founded in 2016, works to enhance Korea-Canada relations.

In 2009, she was a finalist for the Art Gallery of Ontario's Grange Prize and in 2013 was awarded a Smithsonian Artist Research Fellowship. In 2018, she was made a Fellow of the Royal Society of Canada. In 2022, she won the Scotiabank Photography Award.

In 2025, she received a Governor General's Award in Visual and Media Arts for Artistic Achievement and she had additional honours such as, in South Korea, the inaugural Kim Byung-jong Art Award (2025); and been given a facade project at the National Gallery of Canada titled Honouring a Long View.

== Selected exhibitions ==
- Between views, Walter Philips Gallery, Banff, Alberta (1991)
- between departure and arrival, Western Front Gallery, Vancouver (1997)
- Urban Fictions, Presentation House Gallery, Vancouver (1997)
- Crossings, National Gallery of Canada, Ottawa (1998)
- Lost homelands, Kamloops Art Gallery, B. C. (1999)
- Feigned memories, University of Lethbridge Gallery (2003)
- Activating Korea, Govett-Brewster Art Gallery, New Plymouth, New Zealand (2007)
- National Gallery of Canada (CMCP), Ottawa (2006–2007), and the Southern Alberta Art Gallery, Lethbridge (2007)
- Reverberations, Tank Loft Contemporary Art Centre, Chongqing, China (2008)
- Jin-me Yoon: Unbidden (solo), organized and circulated by the Kamloops Art Gallery, B. C. (2004), touring to Oakville Galleries (2005) Mount St. Vincent University Art Gallery (2005), and the National Gallery of Canada
- Passages through Phantasmagoria, Centre Culturel Canadien/Canadian Cultural Centre, Paris (2008)
- Embodied Enactments: Feminist Video Performance in Canada, 1974–2007, Centro Cultural Montehermoso, Vitoria, Spain (2009)
- Surveying: An Uncertain Landscape, Confederation Centre Art Gallery, Charlottetown (2015)
- Photography in Canada 1960–2000, National Gallery of Canada (2017)
- AlterNation, Kamloops Art Gallery, B. C. (2017)
- Spectral Tides (solo), Nanaimo Art Gallery, B.C. (2017)
- Long View, for LandMarks 2017/Repères 2017
- Jin-me Yoon Iyeodosana: gives-on-and-with, Korean Cultural Centre, Ottawa (2017).
- Radial Change: Beginning with the Seventies, Morris and Helen Belkin Art Gallery, Vancouver (2018)
- Through the Memory Atlas: 40 Years of Collecting, Kamloops Art Gallery, B. C. (2018)
- In/Flux: Art of Korean Diaspora, Museum of Vancouver (2018–2019)
- About Time, Vancouver Art Gallery (2022)
- Jin-me-yoon: Honouring a long view, National Gallery of Canada, Ottawa (2024);

== Collections ==
Yoon's work is in the collections of the Vancouver Art Gallery, Agnes Etherington Art Centre, National Gallery of Canada, Kamloops Art Gallery, Oakville Galleries, Canadian Museum of Contemporary Photography, the Seoul Museum of Art and Walter Phillips Gallery, amongst others.

== Awards and honours ==
- Finalist for the Art Gallery of Ontario's Grange Prize (2008);
- Fellow of the Royal Society of Canada (2018);
- Smithsonian Artist Research Fellowship (2013).
- Scotiabank Photography Award (2022);
- Governor General's Award in Visual and Media Arts for Artistic Achievement (2025);
- Inaugural Kim Byung-jong Art Award (2025);
- Honouring a Long View, National Gallery of Canada Facade project (2025);.
