= Liz Magor =

Canadian artist (born 1948)

- Born: 1948 (age 77–78); Winnipeg, Manitoba, Canada
- Known for: Sculptor, photographer

Liz Magor (born 1948) is a Canadian visual artist based in Vancouver. She is well known for her sculptures that address themes of history, shelter, and survival through objects that reference still life, domesticity, and wildlife. She often re-purposes domestic objects such as blankets and is known for using mold-making techniques.

== Biography ==
Magor was born in Winnipeg, Manitoba, in 1948. Magor studied at the University of British Columbia from 1966–1968, and Parsons School of Design in New York from 1968–1970. Subsequently, she completed her diploma at the Vancouver School of Art in 1971. She had a career as an educator at the Ontario College of Art and Design before moving to Vancouver to continue her teaching at the Emily Carr University of Art and Design. Alongside Stan Douglas, Brian Jungen, and Jeff Wall, Magor's work and studio practice was featured in the Vancouver episode of season 8 of the PBS broadcast Art21: Art in the Twenty-First Century.

Magor's work has been produced and exhibited internationally and usually takes the form of sculpture, installation, or photography. Major solo exhibitions of her work have been presented internationally at the Renaissance Society, Chicago; the Carpenter Center for the Visual Arts, Cambridge; the Museum of Modern and Contemporary Art, Nice; the Kunstverein, Hamburg; and the Migros Museum of Contemporary Art, Zurich. In Canada, she has exhibited at institutions such as the Musée d’art contemporain de Montréal, the Art Gallery of Ontario, the Vancouver Art Gallery, the Winnipeg Art Gallery, and the National Gallery of Canada. Alongside Ian Carr-Harris, she represented Canada at the XLI Venice Biennale in 1984 in a show organized by Jessica Bradley, and she was invited to participate in documenta 8 in Kassel in 1987.

In 2001, Magor was awarded the Governor General's Award in Visual and Media Arts. In Vancouver, she was recognized with the Audain Prize for the Visual Arts in 2009. In 2014, she was the recipient of the Gershon Iskowitz Prize, awarded by the Art Gallery of Ontario with a solo exhibition. In 2019, she was named Chevalier de l'Ordre des Arts et des Lettres by the government of France.

== Art practice ==
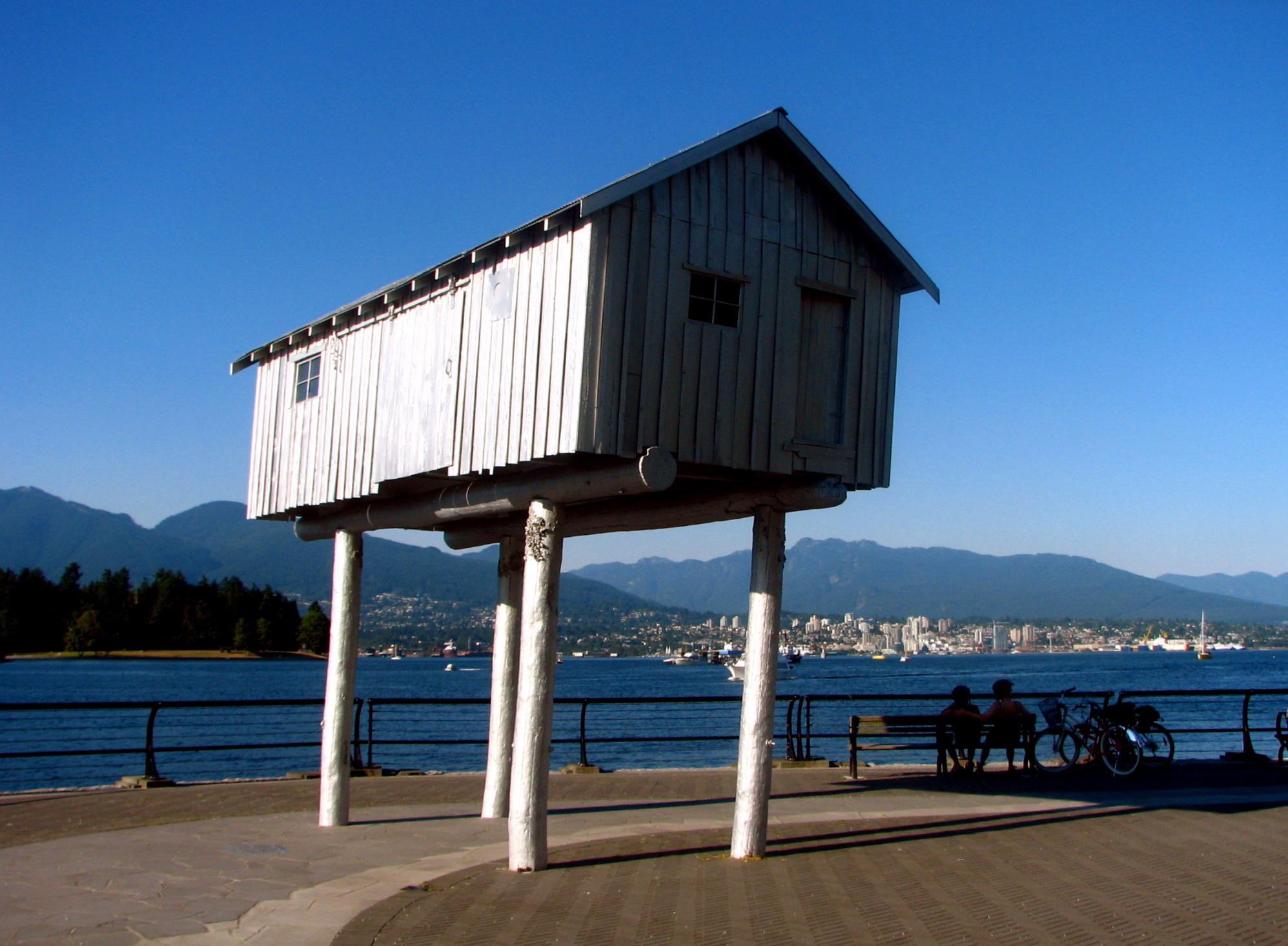
LightShed in 2006

Liz Magor works in sculpture, installation, public art, and photography. Her sculptural work investigates the ontology of ordinary or familiar objects, which she remakes and presents in new contexts. For example, Magor has created facsimiles of food items and their containers, as well as other objects such as driftwood, logs, tree stumps, and clothing. A studio- and object-oriented artist, Magor's work emphasizes process and materiality, and highlights the difference between the real and the simulated.

In previous work, Magor used mold-making and casting techniques to make replicas of coats, trays, and cutlery (which she calls "serviceable objects") as receptacles for other materials (such as candies or cigarettes). These works reference the accumulation of discarded goods and vices that appeal to common impulses. They also raise questions about the social and emotional life of objects. Magor's work has also involved the repurposing of used clothing and old wool blankets (other types of "serviceable objects").

In her article entitled "Magor's Timeless Transitions", Robin Laurence writes: "Art, Liz Magor says, is the place where our perceptions are opened and examined for prolonged periods of time. [...] irresolution prevails and closure eludes us. Her sculptures consistently play reality against unreality, meaning against alternative meaning, initial appearance against later revelation."

Magor's permanent or temporary public works have been installed in Vancouver, Surrey, and Toronto.

Magor is represented by the Susan Hobbs Gallery and Catriona Jeffries in Canada, the Andrew Kreps Gallery in the United States, and Marcelle Alix in France. In her early career, she was represented by Ydessa Hendeles's Ydessa Gallery in Toronto.

== Collections ==
Liz Magor's work is found in public and private collections in Canada and internationally, such as the Vancouver Art Gallery, the Morris and Helen Belkin Art Gallery, the Winnipeg Art Gallery, the Musée d'art contemporain de Montréal, and the National Gallery of Canada, in Canada; the Henry Art Gallery, in the United States; and the Centre national des arts plastiques, FRAC Corsica, and Frac Île-de-France in France.

== Exhibition catalogues ==
- Hogg, Lucy; Magor, Liz; Tousley, Nancy; Shier, Reid (2000). Liz Magor: Deep woods. Toronto: Contemporary Art Gallery of York University. ISBN 978-0-920751-77-0.
- Arnold, Grant; Monk, Philip (2002). Liz Magor. Toronto; Vancouver: Power Plant; Vancouver Art Gallery. ISBN 978-1-894212-00-7.
- Krajewski, Sara; Jeffries, Bill (2008). The Mouth and other storage facilities: Liz Magor. Seattle, WA; Burnaby, BC: Henry Art Gallery Association; Simon Fraser University Gallery. ISBN 978-0935558470.
- Magor, Liz; Kopp, Céline; Robertson, Lisa; Verwoert, Jan (2015). Liz Magor: the blue one comes in black. Milan; Marseille: Mousse Publishing; Triangle France. ISBN 978-88-6749-170-4.
- Adler, Dan; Johnstone, Lesley; Magor, Liz; Munder, Heike; Steinbrügge, Bettina (2016). Liz Magor: Habitude. Montréal; Zurich; Hamburg: Musée d'art contemporain de Montréal; Migros Museum für Gegenwartskunst; Kunstverein in Hamburg. ISBN 978-2-551-25829-1.
- Byers, Dan; Øvstebø, Solveig; Heti, Sheila; Speed, Mitch (2019). Liz Magor: Blowout. Cambridge; Chicago: Carpenter Center for the Arts; Renaissance Society. ISBN 978-0-941548-78-6.
