= Embassy of the United States, Ottawa =

American Embassy in Ottawa, Ontario

Embassy of the United States of America in Ottawa
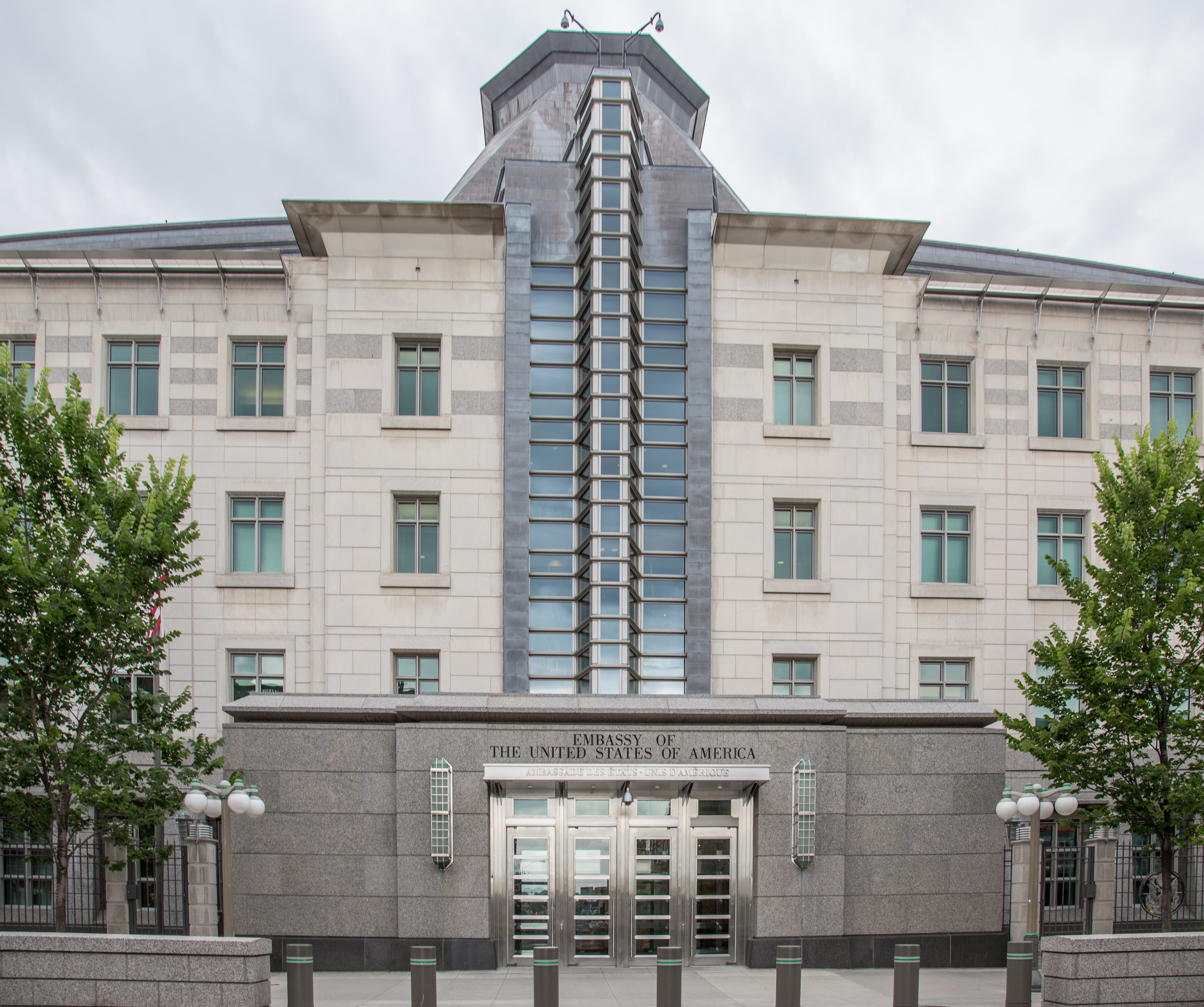
- Embassy seen from the ByWard Market area
- Location: 490 Sussex Drive; Ottawa, Ontario; K1N 1G8
- Coordinates: 45.427858°N 75.695869°W
- Inaugurated: October 8, 1999
- Ambassador: Pete Hoekstra
- Website: ca.usembassy.gov

The Embassy of the United States of America in Ottawa (French: Ambassade des États-Unis d'Amérique à Ottawa) is the diplomatic mission of the United States of America to Canada. Opened in 1999, the embassy complex is located at 490 Sussex Drive in Ottawa, Ontario.

== Former chancery ==
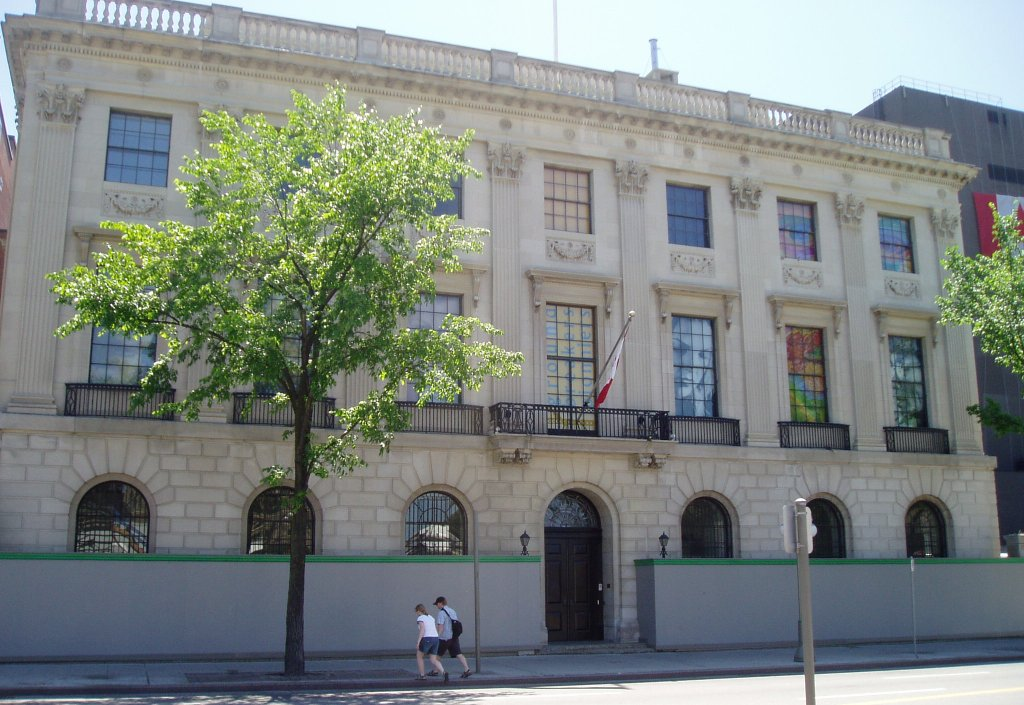
Former chancery of the American embassy in Ottawa at 100 Wellington Street. It is now dedicated for the use of Canada's indigenous peoples.

Before 1999, the diplomatic mission occupied a 1930s-era building at 100 Wellington Street, directly across from Parliament Hill. The Beaux-Arts structure was designed by Cass Gilbert and opened in 1932 as an American legation (full ambassador status was with the Embassy of the United States in London at the time), then as a full embassy after 1943.

The Wellington Street building, a three-storey Indiana limestone structure built in 1930–1931, proved to be too small, however, and embassy employees were spread between eight other Ottawa buildings. Security concerns associated with this distribution necessitated centralization.

The road to a new chancery was a long and difficult one, with attempts made at getting a new structure beginning in the 1960s. Finding an appropriate site and receiving acceptance from both governments proved to be difficult; one proposal to build the embassy in Rockcliffe Park, near the Canada Aviation Museum, was opposed by locals who worried about security threats and congestion. The former chancery is now the Indigenous Peoples Space, dedicated to the indigenous peoples of Canada.

== New embassy ==
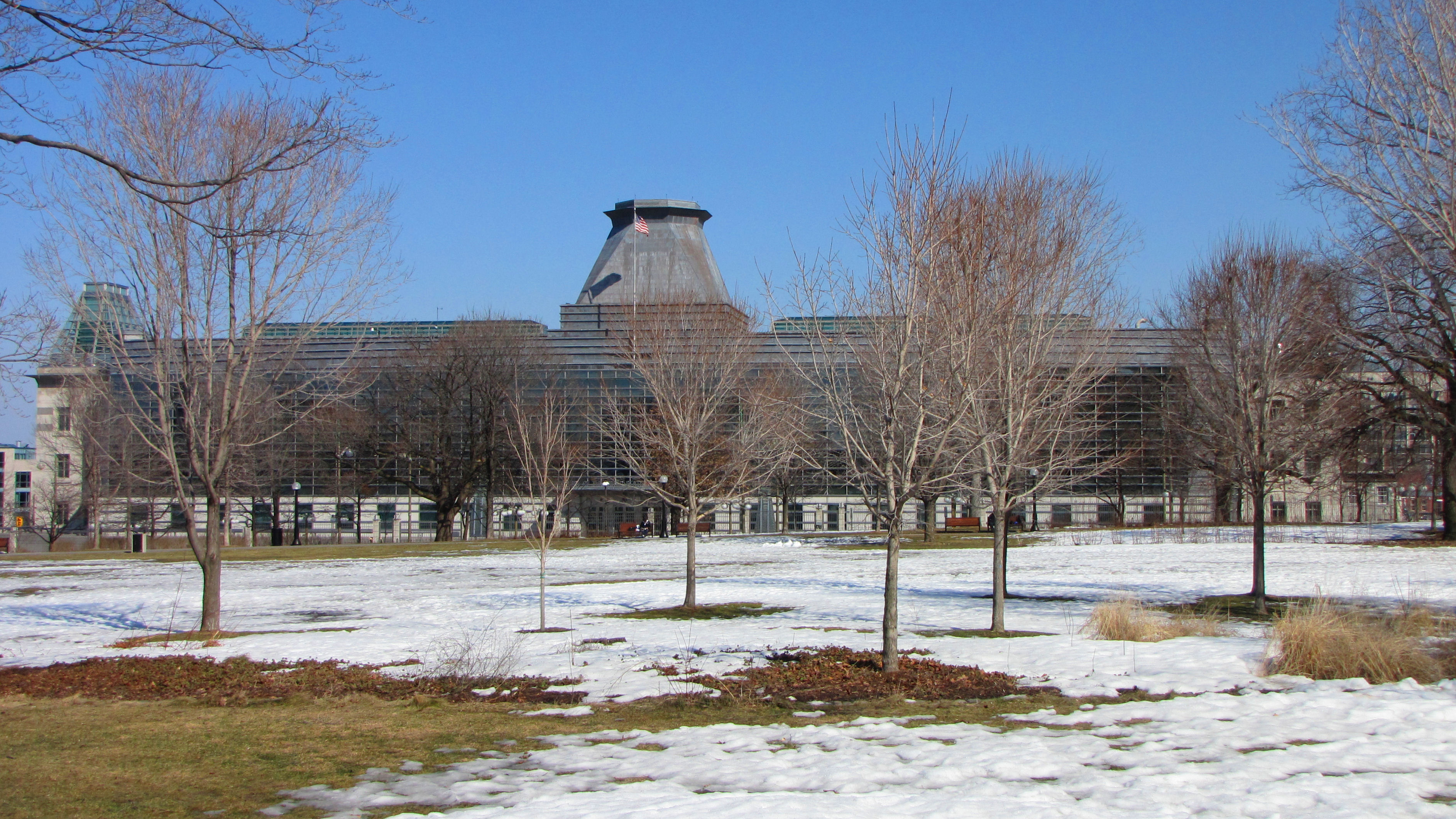
View from Major's Hill Park

The new embassy is located on what used to be a small hill and parking lot on the western edge of the ByWard Market. Early in Ottawa's history, it had been the site of a number of small homes and businesses, but the land was expropriated by the federal government during the World War I and a temporary office building was built on the site for government workers. The building was torn down after the war, but another temporary structure was built on the site during World War II. This structure survived until 1972, when it was razed and left as a parking lot.

To the west of the embassy is Major's Hill Park and Parliament Hill. The National Gallery of Canada is just to the northwest of the embassy, while the Peacekeeping Monument is to the north. To the east of the embassy is the Byward Market, and York Street is steps to the south.

The building's design, by American architect David Childs of Skidmore, Owings & Merrill, sought to reflect the close relationship of friendly neighbors, symbolizing a bridge.

The embassy's interior, showcasing the art of 59 artists from the United States, is organized as two "bars" of office space, joined by an atrium in the center, visible as the tall structure seen from the outside. The design of the building took several years. The architect spoke about the challenge presented by the design project in the wake of the Oklahoma City bombing in 1995. It forced him, he said, to move the atrium to the center of the building, and the glass wall facing Sussex Drive, which had been intended as a fully transparent curtain wall, would now disguise a concrete blast wall with smaller windows punctuating the concrete. Interior furnishings in the atrium area feature "Niagara blue" a color chosen to "reflect the shared experience, close relationship and free trade association between the United States and Canada — Niagara blue because of the shared beauty of Niagara Falls."

The embassy was dedicated by President Bill Clinton on October 8, 1999, the first time in American history that a president had personally dedicated a new embassy. The building was included amongst other architecturally interesting and historically significant buildings in Doors Open Ottawa, held on June 2 and 3, 2012.

== Controversy ==
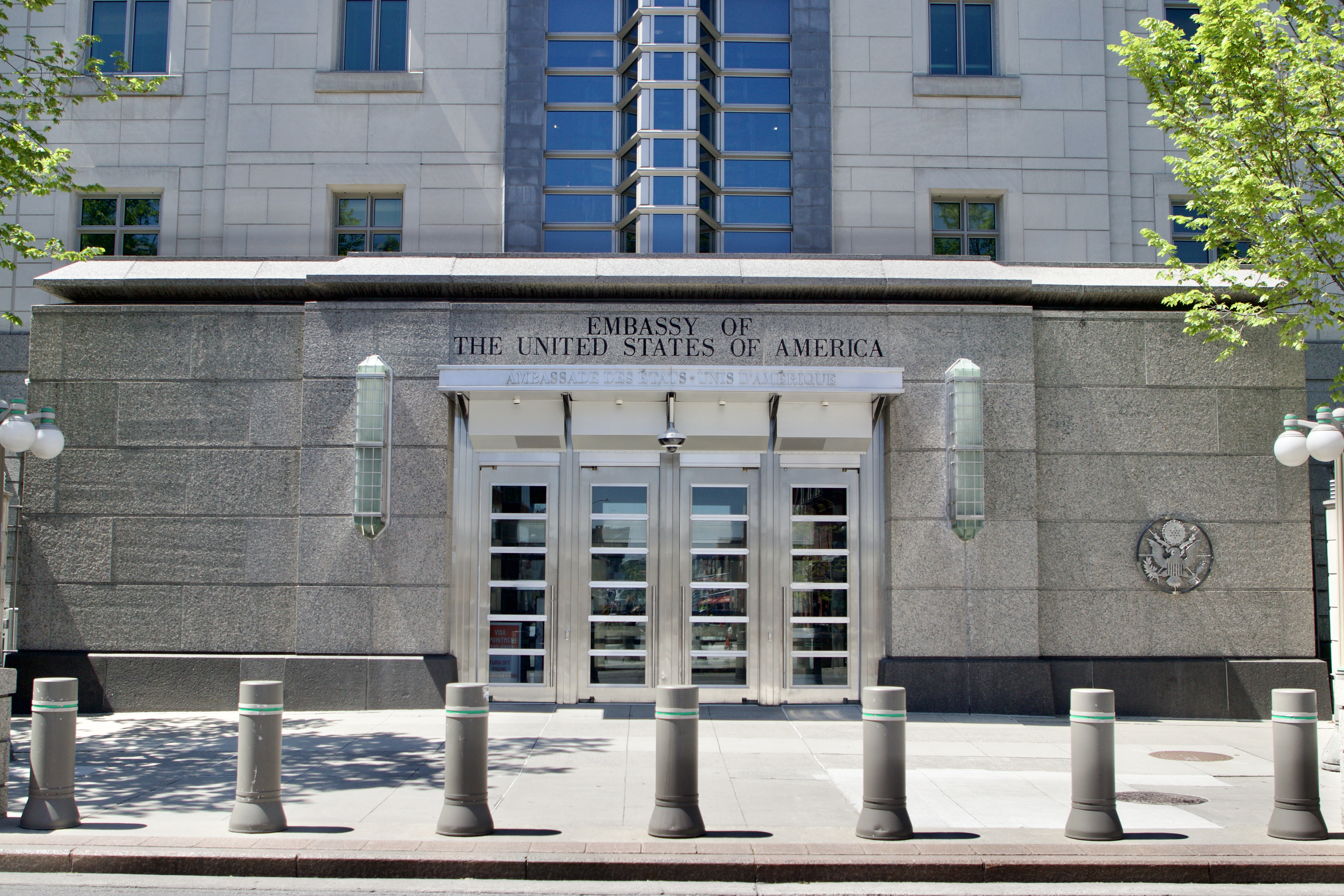
Main entrance in downtown Ottawa; 2025

Local architects and citizens complained that the structure overshadowed the historic market and suggested that it looked like a battleship, or worried about the danger posed to local businesses by potential terrorist attacks against the embassy. These complaints were aggravated after the September 11 attacks, when a number of roads around the embassy were blocked, congesting traffic and hurting businesses. The immediately adjacent lane on Sussex Drive was permanently closed.

Security concerns voiced by the Bureau of Diplomatic Security before the completion of construction were overruled by its parent agency, the U.S. Department of State. In the aftermath of the 1998 embassy bombings in East Africa, there was serious consideration given at the time about whether the new U.S. Embassy should be completed, especially considering the large amount of glass on one side of the new Chancery that faced a public street.

== See also ==
- List of ambassadors of the United States to Canada
- Lornado – residence of the U.S. Ambassador to Canada
- Embassy of Canada, Washington, D.C.
