= James W. Borcoman =

Canadian curator of photography (1926–2019)

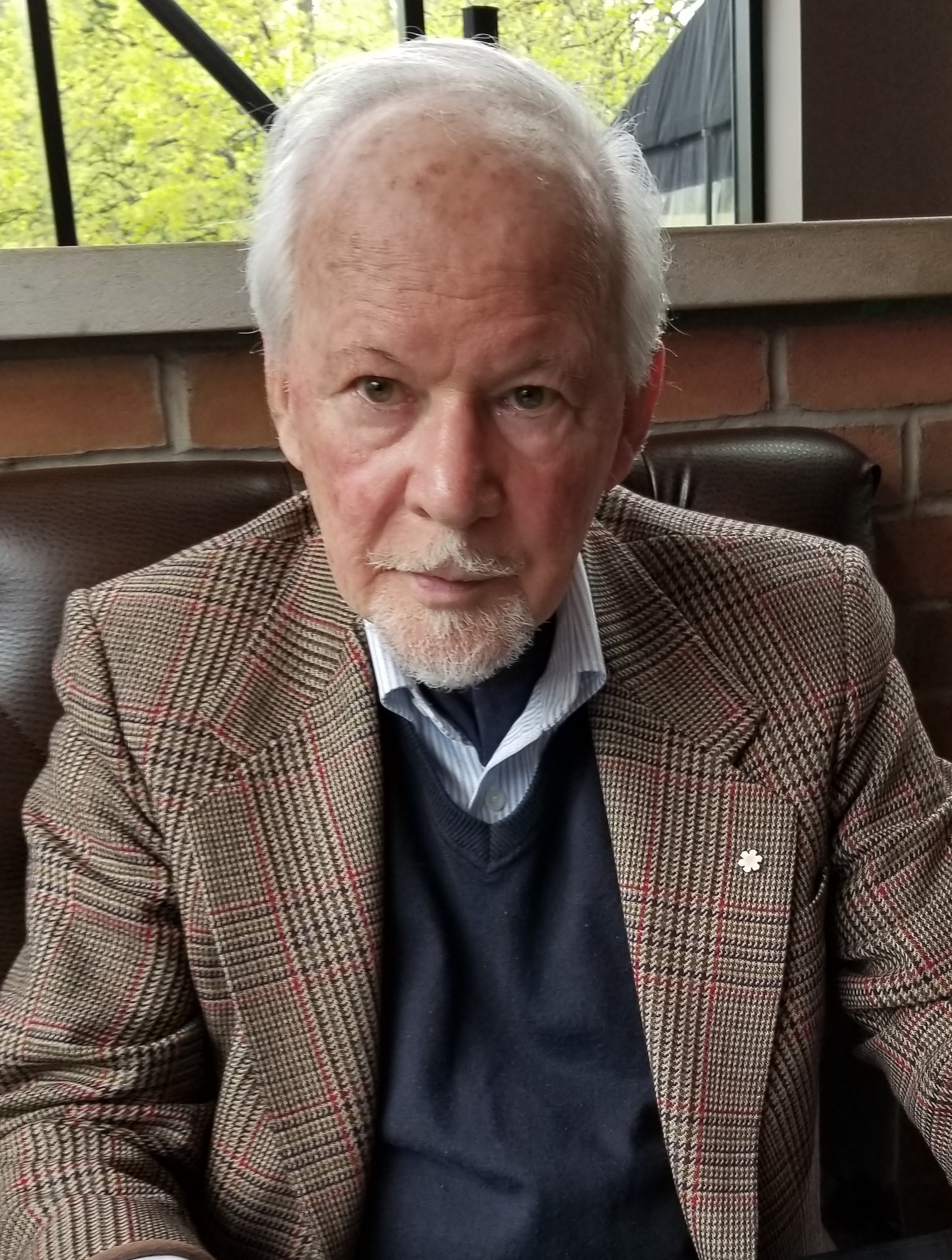
- Born: James Willmott Borcoman; January 17, 1926; Smooth Rock Falls, Ontario, Canada
- Died: October 29, 2019 (aged 93); Ottawa
- Education: Honours BA University of New Brunswick (1955); MFA, history of photography University of Buffalo (1969-1971) with Beaumont Newhall and Nathan Lyons, with two years of research at the George Eastman Museum, Rochester (degree awarded 1975)
- Occupation: Photography curator
- Known for: Founding curator of photography (1971-1994), National Gallery of Canada, Ottawa
- Board member of: Society for Photographic Education, (1967-1970)
- Spouse: Therese Jomphe (m. 1956)
- Children: Sophie (daughter, b. 1967)
- Awards: Honourable Mention and Blue Ribbon Award, American Film Festival, 1964; Distinguished Achievement award Photographic History Society New York (1977); seal City of Arles (1977); bronze medal from the Leipzig International Book Fair (1977) for Charles Nègre, 1820-1880; Doctor of Fine Arts, Honoris Causa, Carleton University, Ottawa (1996); Doctor of Laws, Honoris Causa,Concordia University, Montreal (1996); Member of the Order of Canada (2014)

James W. Borcoman CM D.F.A. LL. D. (January 17, 1926 – October 29, 2019), also known as Jim Borcoman, was the founding curator of photography, National Gallery of Canada from 1971 to 1994, followed by Ann Thomas (1994-2021). He was a pioneer in promoting photography as an art form in Canada, having established the Photographs Collection at the National Gallery in 1967 as the first of its kind in Canada, and developing its growth to over 19,000 objects, resulting in a collection known for the quality of its nineteenth and twentieth century holdings and for its exhibitions and publications. He also promoted contemporary Canadian photographers and was himself a photographer with work in the collection of the National Gallery of Canada.

== Career ==
Jim Borcoman was born in Smooth Rock Falls, Ontario. He served with the Royal Canadian Air Force and Canadian Army (1943-1945), then took an Honours BA, University of New Brunswick (1955). Afterwards, he had a Teaching fellowship at the University of British Columbia (1955-1956) and a Readership in History, University of New Brunswick (1955-1959).

He began working at the National Gallery of Canada in the Education Department (1960-1966). He became Director of Exhibitions and Education (1966-1968), and Director of Education and Audio-Visual Production (1968-1969). A summer workshop in photographic history and criticism at the George Eastman Museum, Rochester (1967) interested him in photography and he went on to take his MFA in the history of photography at the University of Buffalo (1969-1971) with Beaumont Newhall and Nathan Lyons, with two years of research at the George Eastman Museum (his degree was awarded in 1975). He became the Acting Curator of Photography at the National Gallery and began the photography collection in 1967. He was appointed the full-time Curator of Photographs in 1971, a position from which he retired as Curator Emeritus in 1994. He also served as chairman of a history of photography seminar, Arles, France (1977) and as the Adjunct Professor photography University of Ottawa (1971-1975) and as Honorary Adjunct Professor Arizona State University (1985). He lectured widely in Canada, the United States and France, and continued as a consultant and lecturer on the history of photography after he retired from the National Gallery.

His many exhibitions, books and catalogues at the National Gallery of Canada include, among others, the Goodridge Roberts Retrospective (1969-1970); Charles Nègre, 1820-1880 (1976); Eugène Atget 1857-1927 (1982); Intimate Images: 129 Daguerreotypes 1841-1857, The Phyllis Lambert Gift (1988); Karsh: The Art of the Portrait (1989) (Produced in collaboration with Library and Archives Canada); Magicians of Light: Photographs from the Collection of the National Gallery of Canada (1993); 19th-century French photographs from the National Gallery of Canada (2010); and The Photograph as Object for the Art Gallery of Ontario (1969). Borcoman also published many articles and films as well as being a photographer himself with an exhibition of his photographs at the University of New Brunswick Art Centre in 1962 and work in the collection of the National Gallery.

An interview with Borcoman in 2012 is in the library archives of Ryerson University.

James Borcoman died in Ottawa on October 29, 2019.

== Awards ==
- Honourable Mention and Blue Ribbon Award for film on David Milne, American Film Festival, 1964;
- Distinguished Achievement award Photographic History Society New York (1977);
- Seal, City of Arles (1977);
- Bronze medal from the Leipzig International Book Fair (1977) for Charles Nègre, 1820-1880;
- Doctor of Fine Arts, Honoris Causa, Carleton University, Ottawa (1996);
- Doctor of Laws, Honoris Causa,Concordia University, Montreal (1996);
- Member of the Order of Canada (2014)
