= Art Toronto =

Art fair

Coordinates: 43°38′39″N 79°23′12″W

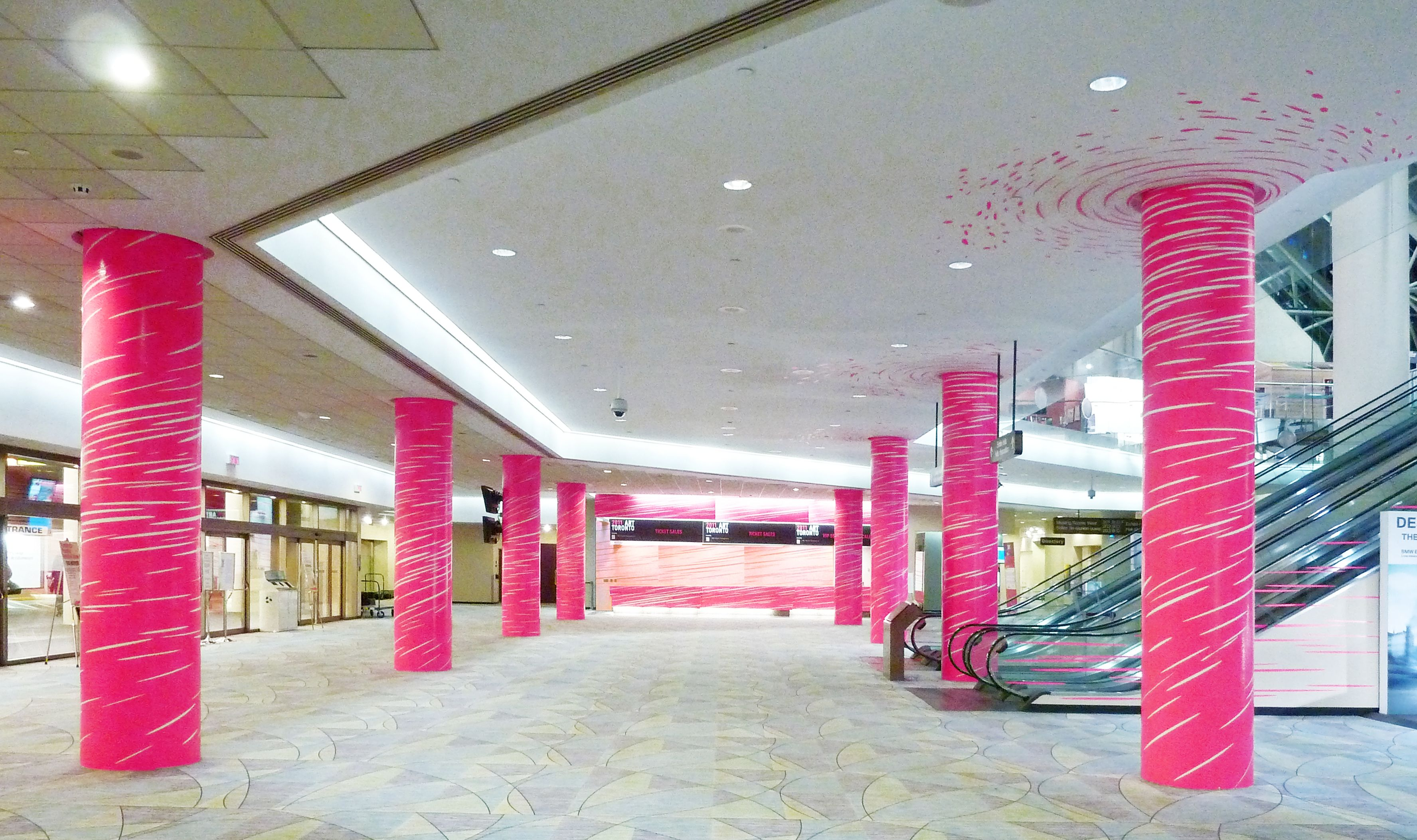

Art Toronto, previously known as the Toronto International Art Fair, is an international contemporary art exhibition held each year in Toronto, Ontario, Canada at the Metro Toronto Convention Centre since 2000. Since its inception, it has grown to become the pre-eminent forum for displaying contemporary art in Canada, with exhibitors from around the world. It is Canada's oldest and largest international art fair.

Art Toronto features 100 commercial galleries from Canada and around the world. After two years of hybrid and virtual programming during the pandemic, the fair returned to the Metro Toronto Convention Centre in 2022, and, as of 2023, is directed by Mia Nielsen.

For the 2023 fair, Kitty Scott will curate Focus, a 2,000-square-foot exhibition which will present new artworks by artists alongside historical work. Art Toronto is also launching Discover, a new section dedicated to exhibitions of work by emerging artists.
