= Lynne Cohen =

Canadian and American photographer (1944–2014)

- Born: July 3, 1944; Racine, Wisconsin
- Died: May 12, 2014 (aged 69); McGill University Health Centre, Montreal, Quebec, Canada
- Education: University of Wisconsin
- Known for: Photographer
- Spouse: Andrew Lugg
- Awards: Governor General's Award; Scotiabank Photography Award

Lynne Cohen (July 3, 1944 – May 12, 2014) was an influential American-Canadian photographer, best known for her photographs of empty institutional interiors.

== Life ==
Born in Racine, Wisconsin, Cohen was educated in printmaking and sculpture at the University of Wisconsin, Madison, Wisconsin, and in Ann Arbor and Eastern Michigan University, Ypsilanti, Michigan. She studied for a year at the Slade School of Fine Art in London, England.

Cohen lived and worked in Canada beginning in 1973, initially in Ottawa, and in Montreal from 2005 until 2014.

She taught at several institutions, primarily Eastern Michigan University (1968–1973), Algonquin College (1973–1975), and the University of Ottawa (1974–2005).

Cohen died of lung cancer at the age of 69 on May 12, 2014, in the palliative care unit at McGill University Health Centre in Montreal, Quebec, Canada. In accordance with her personal wishes, no funeral service was held.

== Work ==
Cohen was known for her photographs of empty institutional interiors: living rooms, public halls, retirement homes, laboratories, offices, showrooms, shooting ranges, factories, spas, and military installations. Despite this interest in living and working spaces, Cohen's photographs are usually devoid of human presence. She photographed using an 8 x 10" view camera, allowing her to capture great detail, and create very large prints beginning in the mid-eighties. Her work has been published in catalogues such as Occupied Territory (1987) and No Man's Land (2001). In one of her last monographs, Cohen described a major goal in her work, a "long-standing preoccupation with formal, intellectual and ideological camouflage."

== Exhibitions ==
Cohen's work has been featured in well over 100 solo exhibitions, as well as numerous two- and three-person exhibitions.

Solo exhibitions of her work have been held in Canada at the National Gallery of Canada; Art Gallery of Ontario, Toronto; McCord Museum, Montreal; Design Exchange, Toronto; Musée d’art contemporain de Montréal; and Presentation House Gallery, Vancouver; as well as internationally at the Museum für Gestaltung, Zurich; Chinati Foundation, Marfa, Texas; FRAC, Limousin, Limoges; Museum voor Fotografie, Antwerp; Centro de Fotografía, Salamanca; Musée de l'Elysée, Lausanne; Image/Imatge, Orthez, France; Museum für Photographie, Braunschweig; Fototeca, Havana; Le Point du Jour, Cherbourg-Octeville; Fundació Mapfre, Madrid, Córdoba; Bilbao, Museum of Contemporary Art; UMass, Amherst; and at the Centro de la Imagen, Mexico City. Since her death, other substantial shows of her work have been mounted at Kitchener-Waterloo Art Gallery, Ontario, Winnipeg Art Gallery, Ottawa Art Gallery, Museo Universidad de Navarra, Pamplona, and the Burnaby Art Gallery.

== Awards ==
Cohen was the recipient of numerous awards and prizes for her work. In 2005, Cohen was the recipient of the Governor General's Award in Visual and Media Arts. She was nominated for the Grange Prize, Art Gallery of Ontario, Toronto in 2009. In 2011, she was the recipient of the inaugural Scotiabank Photography Award.

== Public collections ==
Cohen's work is represented in the collections of over 50 public institutions. In Canada these include the National Gallery of Canada; the Art Museum at the University of Toronto; Art Gallery of Ontario; Canada Council Art Bank; Musée d'art contemporain de Montréal; Musée national des beaux-arts du Québec; Canadian Centre for Architecture, Montreal; and the Walter Phillips Gallery, Banff. Internationally, her work is held in the collections of the Bibliothèque Nationale, Paris; Kunsthaus Zurich; New Orleans Museum of Art, New Orleans; Center for Creative Photography, Tucson; Centre Georges Pompidou, Paris; Museo Universidad de Navarra, Pamplona; George Eastman Museum, Rochester, New York; Museum Folkwang, Essen; the Princeton University Art Museum; and the Tate Modern, amongst others.
