= Douglas Haynes =

Canadian artist

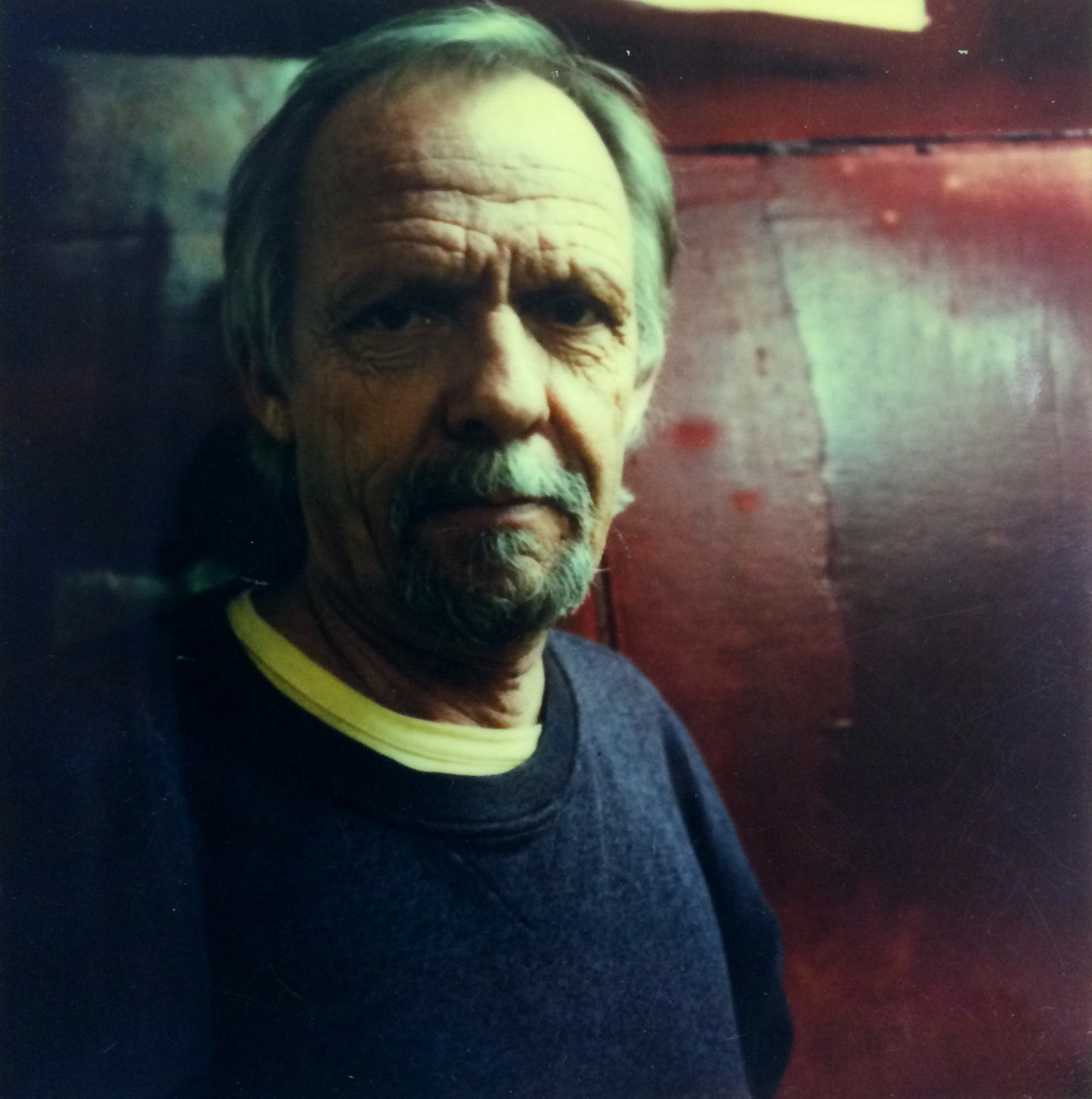
- Douglas Haynes, early 1990s
- Born: Douglas Hector Haynes; January 1, 1936; Regina, Saskatchewan, Canada
- Died: February 10, 2016 (aged 80); Edmonton, Alberta, Canada
- Education: Provincial Institute of Technology and Art, Calgary, Canada; Royal Academy of Art, The Hague, Netherlands
- Known for: painting
- Notable work: 'Split-Diamond' series;"Promise to Dusk"; "To Morning Light"; The Toledo Series
- Movement: abstract art, modernism, cubism
- Patrons: City of Edmonton, National Gallery of Canada

Douglas Hector Haynes RCA (January 1, 1936 – February 10, 2016) was a Canadian abstract artist and teacher.

== Early life ==
Haynes was born and raised in Regina, Saskatchewan. He studied at Alberta's Provincial Institute of Technology and Art (now the Alberta College of Art and Design) with Marion Nicoll, Ronald Spickett, and Illingworth Kerr, from 1954–1958, and the Royal Academy of Art, The Hague, Netherlands in 1960–1961.

== Career ==
Haynes first became known for prints and painted constructions using burlap, string and other materials (1963–1969). Clement Greenberg wrote approvingly of Haynes' art in 1963, writing:

"In Douglas Haynes' touched-up prints I was even more surprised to see the lay-out of Adolph Gottlieb's Burst paintings unabashedly present.... This lay-out was handled, all the same, with a certain felicity, so that I had to conclude that Haynes had added something of his own to the idea by reducing it in size".

Speaking of Greenberg in 2006, Haynes remembered "how he didn't particularly like my Toledo paintings when he first saw them in the studio, but how he told me I was artistically right on when he caught the finished show at the Edmonton Art Gallery."

Haynes was elected a member of the Royal Canadian Academy of Arts in 1974. From 1970 to 1995, he served as a professor in Department of Art and Design at University of Alberta, serving from 1976 to 1980 as chairman and retaining the title of professor emeritus after retirement.

In 2005, Haynes was the subject an episode of the nationally-broadcast art documentary series "Landscape As Muse", and is featured in Roald Nasgaard's 2008 book, "Abstract Painting in Canada." According to Nasgaard, "In 1975 Haynes turned overtly to using colour. In 1977 he met Jack Bush during the latter's retrospective show at the Edmonton Art Gallery, an encounter that set into motion a series of experiments, using some of Bush's devices, in "an attempt to get the colour to spread." The outcome was the Split-Diamond series, which signalled his maturity as a painter".

== Exhibitions ==
Haynes exhibited in many group shows including: The Fifth and Sixth Biennial of Canadian Painting, National Gallery of Canada 1963, 1965; The Canadian Canvas, Time Life Touring Exhibition, 1975; Certain Traditions: Painting and Sculpture of Canada and Great Britain, 1978; Abstraction x 4, Canada House, London England; Bonn, West Germany; Paris, France, 1985; and The Development of Abstract Painting in Canada, Calgary, Alberta, 1993.

== Collections ==
Two monumental paintings by Haynes (titled Promise to Dusk and To Morning Light) adorn either side of the staircase leading to council chambers in Edmonton City Hall. A group of 13 large paintings in the Art Gallery of Alberta's collection, known as The Toledo Series, was inspired by paintings El Greco made for the Sacristy of the Cathedral of Toledo, Spain,
