= Nancy Tousley =

American art critic

RCA Nancy Tousley
- Born: 1943 (age 82–83); Louisiana
- Education: Vassar College (1965), Brooklyn Museum Art School (1968)
- Occupations: art critic, journalist, art writer and independent curator
- Awards: Governor General's Award in Visual and Media Arts (2011).

Nancy Tousley (born 1943) is a senior art critic, journalist, art writer and independent curator whose practice has included writing for a major daily newspaper, art magazines, and exhibition catalogues.

== Early life and education ==
Born in Louisiana, Tousley graduated from Vassar College in 1965 and studied visual art at The Brooklyn Museum Art School from 1965–68. In 1971, she was awarded an Andrew W. Mellon Foundation Fellowship for curatorial internship training in the Department of Prints and Drawings, The Brooklyn Museum, and was appointed assistant curator of that department in 1973. From 1975–76, she served as Acting Assistant Curator in Charge of Prints and Drawings at the Art Gallery of Ontario, Toronto.

== Career ==
Tousley's work as art critic of the Calgary Herald appeared regularly from 1978–1998. She joined the Herald as a staff writer in late 1979. In addition to reviewing local, national and international art exhibitions, her newspaper practice included feature and profile writing, arts news reporting and special series.

She was senior arts writer and art critic of the Calgary Herald, where she also served as Assistant Editor and Arts Coordinator of the Entertainment department and edited the freestanding Sunday Books and the Arts section. She was a contributing editor to Canadian Art magazine from 1986 to 2016.

Her reviews, interviews and feature articles have appeared in magazines such as The Print Collector's Newsletter, Artscanada, Vanguard, Parachute, Border Crossings and Canadian Art since the early 1970s. Her essays on artists have appeared in some 40 public art gallery and museum catalogues. Her work has been commissioned by the Agnes Etherington Art Centre, Kingston, Ont.; the Art Gallery of Hamilton; the Art Gallery of Peel; the Art Gallery of York University, Toronto; the Contemporary Art Gallery, Vancouver; the Dunlop Art Gallery, Regina, Sask.; the Edmonton Art Gallery; the Illingworth Kerr Gallery of the Alberta College of Art and Design, Calgary; the McMichael Collection of Canadian Art, Kleinburg, Ont.; the Mendel Art Gallery, Saskatoon, Sask.; the Montreal Museum of Fine Arts; Oakville Galleries, Oakville, Ont.; the Southern Alberta Art Gallery, Lethbridge; the Tom Thomson Memorial Art Gallery, Thunder Bay, Ont.; the University of Lethbridge Art Gallery; the Mackenzie Art Gallery, Regina; the Vancouver Art Gallery; the Walter Phillips Gallery of The Banff Centre, the Art Gallery of Alberta, the Art Gallery of Grande Prairie; and the Glenbow Museum.

In 2011, Tousley was appointed the first Critic in Residence at the Alberta College of Art and Design.

== Awards ==
Her work has been recognized with several awards. In 1997, she received a Publisher's Award for Leadership, from the Calgary Herald. The same year, the Board of Governors of the Alberta College of Art and Design honoured her with its Award of Excellence for her contributions to art in Alberta, the equivalent of an honorary degree. In 1999 and again in 2001, the Ontario Association of Art Galleries recognized her work with awards for best curatorial writing on contemporary art. In 2002, the Canadian Museums Association honoured her career with its award for outstanding achievement in arts journalism. In 2009, she was awarded the Medal of the Royal Canadian Academy of Arts for distinguished contributions to the visual arts as a writer and editor.

Most recently, in 2011, she was awarded the Governor General's Award in Media and the Visual Arts for her distinguished contribution to art in Canada.

== Independent curating ==
The Berenice Abbott Portfolios, Glenbow Museum, Calgary, Alberta (1982). (Traveled to the Southern Alberta Art Gallery and The Edmonton Art Gallery.)

Seven Artists from Alberta: Art in This Region, Canada House Cultural Centre, London, England (1984). (Traveled in England and to the Centre Culturel du Canada, Paris, France.)

Investigating Space: Sculpture and Drawings by Carroll Moppett, Southern Alberta Art Gallery, Lethbridge, Alberta (1984).

Structures of Clarity: Prints by Margaret May, Whyte Museum of the Canadian Rockies, Banff, Alberta (1987).

Imitation of Life: John Hall's Still-life Portraits, Agnes Etherington Art Centre, Queen's University, Kingston, Ontario (1989). (Traveled to the Glenbow Museum, Kitchener/Waterloo Art Gallery, Art Gallery of Halifax, Memorial University Art Gallery.)

William Perehudoff, Mendel Art Gallery, Saskatoon, Saskatchewan (1993–94). (Traveled to the Edmonton Art Gallery and the Glenbow Museum.)

Welcome to Our World: Contemporary Canadian Folk Art, McMichael Collection of Canadian Art, Kleinberg, Ontario (1996–97). (Co-curator with Susan Foshay and Pascale Galipeau)

Carol Wainio: Persistent Images, Art Gallery of York University (1998–99).

The News From Here: 2013 Alberta Biennial of Contemporary Art, Art Gallery of Alberta, Edmonton (January 26 - May 5, 2013).

Made in Calgary: The 1990s, (2013), Glenbow Museum, Calgary.

A Sublime Vernacular: The Landscape Paintings of Levine Flexhaug, (2015-2017), Art Gallery of Grande Prairie, Alberta. (Co-curator with Peter White. Exhibition travelled to Illingworth Kerr Gallery, Mackenzie Art Gallery, Rodman Hall Art Centre, Contemporary Art Gallery, Vancouver).

Walter May: Object Lessons, One New Work series, Glenbow Museum (Feb. 27-May 22, 2016).

Pamela Norrish: Magical Thinking, One New Work series, Glenbow Museum (June 25-Sept. 5, 2016).

M.N. Hutchinson: The Last Longest Day, One New Work series, Glenbow Museum, (Oct. 22, 2016-March 26, 2017).

== Publications ==
- Carol Wainio : Persistent Images, Carol Wainio and Nancy Tousley, York University Art Gallery, Toronto.
- Made in Calgary: The 1990s, (2013), Glenbow Museum, Calgary.
- A Sublime Vernacular: The Landscape Paintings of Levine Flexhaug, (2015-2017), the Art Gallery of Grande Prairie, Alberta. (Co-curator with Peter White. Exhibition travelled to Illingworth Kerr Gallery, Mackenzie Art Gallery, Rodman Hall Art Centre, Contemporary Art Gallery, Vancouver).
