= Bartol =

Bartol may refer to:

- Bartol (surname), a surname found in Europe and the Americas
- Bartol (given name), a Croatian name
- Bartol, a trade name for Phenobarbital
- Bartol Research Institute, a physics institution in Delaware
