= Chris Cran =

Canadian artist (born 1949)

- Born: 1949; Ocean Falls, British Columbia, Canada
- Education: studied at the Kootenay School of Art, Nelson, B.C. and Alberta College of Art and Design (ACAD) (Honours painting, 1979)
- Known for: artist

Chris Cran CM RCA (born 1949 in Ocean Falls, British Columbia) is a Canadian visual artist, based in Calgary, Alberta.

Cran's work "investigates perception and illusion, and the viewer’s role in how images are formed...Widely exhibited across Canada and internationally recognized, Cran has become known for turning nothing into something, with the slightest push. Cran’s paintings, included in numerous Canadian collections, have to do with visual tricks, images that appear one way but have been made another way." He has been described in The New York Times as a painter who "…has built a career on tampering with people’s perceptions." In an article published in Galleries West, Jeffrey Spalding, who was senior curator at the Beaverbrook Art Gallery in New Brunswick, described the 2015–2016 multi-partner major survey of Cran's work at the National Gallery of Canada, the Art Gallery of Alberta (AGA) and the Southern Alberta Art Gallery (SAAG), Lethbridge, Alberta as a "remarkable and unique career milestone" with exhibition organizers describing Cran as "influential" and "one of the country’s most notable painters of the last few decades."

== Education and artistic influences ==
Cran studied at the Kootenay School of Art, Nelson, B.C. and Alberta College of Art and Design (ACAD) (Honours painting, 1979). In 1978 Cran attended a lecture in Edmonton by American art critic Clement Greenberg – one of a series Greenberg presented in that city. Cran was provoked and irritated by Greenberg's already outdated dogma. Greenberg had held such sway in Canada as well as the United States and was considered by some to be one of the most renowned art critics in American history. Critics such as Leo Steinberg and others argued that Greenberg dealt more with what artists and curators could not do, such as contextualize an art object and glorify kitsch. Cran was of the next generation of artists who embraced post-modernity and Greenberg's ideas were entrenched in modernity.

== Work ==
In a 2003 review published in Canadian Art Magazine, Calgary Herald art critic Nancy Tousley compared Cran's creative process to meteorological events, storms, showers and "thunderous, lightning speed one offs" in which he produces experimental works based on an idea as catalyst using a handful of different styles. The result is a body of work that looks like it was not produced by one artist but many. In his review of Cran's 2009 exhibition entitled Bright Spiral Standard at Toronto's Clint Roenisch Gallery, The Globe and Mail's art critic Gary Michael Dault described Cran's exhibition as a "dazzling sojourn in sophisticated visuality" and "fun" with its "shimmering, graphically delicate but exacting paintings." Dault said that Cran's allusive work borders on visual satire in which Cran gleefully references, analyses, demystifies and skillfully manipulates different genres and styles including still life, portraiture, and abstraction informed by Pop Art, Photo-realism, and Op Art. One painting Sailor was a product of nine years from inception in 2000 at the Emma Lake Artists' Workshops to its completion for this exhibition.

Canadian actor, writer, comedian, and film director Bruce McCulloch, who was asked by the National Gallery of Canada to write an essay for the exhibition catalogue,Sincerely Yours, described Crane's Self portrait; Accepting a Cheque for the Commission of this Painting,

..."In it, Chris holds a large cheque with the fee he got paid for it, being handed to him by the man that commissioned him. The exact amount he was paid. That is a perfect comedy idea. We all wish we had thought of it. And, of course, it celebrates and skewers the very nature of art and commerce at the same time. I laughed and kept looking at it. How cheeky and, well, brilliant.

— Bruce McCulloch September 2015

In 1999 Diana Nemiroff observed that the Canadian art scene in 1999 was highly compartmentalized and regional art suffered from both isolation and the small size of its arts communities. However, this didn't "mean they're not terrific..Those people who know [Chris Cran] really respect his work... He's quite rigorous, very alive, very vital, not an academic artist at all."

== Art educator, mentor and activist ==
After graduating from Calgary-based ACAD in 1979 Cran "served as a respected teacher" there from 1990 to 1993. Following a hiatus of five years he returned to ACAD where he is currently teaching. Cran is an instructor for One Yellow Rabbit's Summer Lab Intensive.

== Awards and honours ==
Cran was inducted into the Royal Canadian Academy of Arts in 2002.

Cran was elected a Fellow of the Royal Canadian Geographical Society in 2015.

In 2005 Cran was awarded the Keith Evans Memorial Scholarship to assist Cran in his senior artist-in-residence tenure at The Banff Centre, where he mentored other artists while producing his own new works.

Cran's work was included in the second Canadian Biennial held November 2, 2012 to February 18, 2013, at the National Gallery of Canada (NGC). The NGC biennial showcases recent purchases made for the gallery's permanent collection. Three of Cran's works – Guest Host, 2011, Hand Gesture No. 6 (OK), 1992 and Manifesto, 2010 – were acquired in 2012.

Cran's work was also selected for the 2013 Alberta Biennial of Contemporary Art, which featuring 36 Alberta-based artists in an exhibition curated by Nancy Tousley and entitled The News From Here. The exhibition entitled The News From Here with a catalogue by the same name, curated by Nancy Tousley, "explores the theme of post-regionalism in Alberta art," where artists like Cran,

"are forming their identities around the places they choose to live, work and travel—the idea of a single, dominant centre is no longer applicable as it is distant and divorced from their daily lives. They are now, more than ever, aware of the larger art world in which they participate. In this exhibition, the physical, societal and cultural geography of Alberta is felt in the works of art, both in the foreground and background of imagery, subject matter, content and critical issues. Rather than a defensive regionalism, one finds in their work an acceptance and consideration of place."

— 2013 Alberta Biennial of Contemporary Art

Cran was awarded the Doug & Lois Mitchell Outstanding Calgary Artist Award on February 20, 2015, at the Mayor’s Lunch for Arts Champions. The Award honours innovative Calgary-based artists who are acknowledged by their peers, have achieved national and/or international recognition and "have significantly enriched artistic discourse in Canada."

== Selected exhibitions ==
Chris Cran: Surveying the Damage, 1977–97 In 1999 his retrospective exhibition entitled Chris Cran: Surveying the Damage, 1977–97 with works produced over two decades – including his student years at ACAD – was shown at the Kelowna Art Gallery in British Columbia, in Saskatoon, and in Toronto at the Museum of Contemporary Canadian Art (July 8, 1999 – October, 1999).

Patterns of Disappearance was exhibited at the National Gallery of Canada from June 16, 1999, to November 28, 1999.

Major Survey – Sincerely Yours, Chris Cran, 2015–2016 A major multi-partner survey of Cran's artistic production spanning over thirty years, was co-curated by Josée Drouin-Brisebois, Senior Curator of Contemporary Art at the NGC and Catherine Crowston, Deputy Director and Chief Curator, of the Art Gallery of Alberta (AGA) in Edmonton, Alberta The exhibition entitled Sincerely Yours opened at the AGA on September 12, 2015, in the spring of 2016 at the NGC. The exhibition includes over one hundred works from Cran's own collection, other private collectors, galleries and museums. A painting entitled, Self-Portrait With Large Audience Trying to Remember What Carmelita Pope Looks Like 1988 in which Cran refers to a TV commercial for Pam cooking spray featuring Carmelita Pope. Cran was intrigued by the idea of "a large appreciative audience for the most trivial things." Stephen Hunt of the Calgary Herald described Cran's work as the "rhetoric of the image," in reference to the iconic essay by Roland Barthes.

The exhibition Inherent Virtue, at the Southern Alberta Art Gallery (SAAG), Lethbridge, Alberta from September 25, 2015, to November 22, 2015, was part of the major survey of Cran's work.

== Selected collections ==
Cran's work is in the permanent collections of the National Gallery of Canada, the Art Gallery of Nova Scotia, Art Gallery of Windsor, Banff Centre for the Arts, Canada Council Art Bank, Edmonton Art Gallery, Glenbow Museum, Landfall Press, New York, New York, MacKenzie Art Gallery, Mendel Art Gallery, Musée des beaux-arts de Montréal, Nickle Arts Museum, North York Art Gallery, University of Lethbridge Art Gallery and private collections.
