= Provincial Institute of Technology and Art =

Institute of Technology and Art

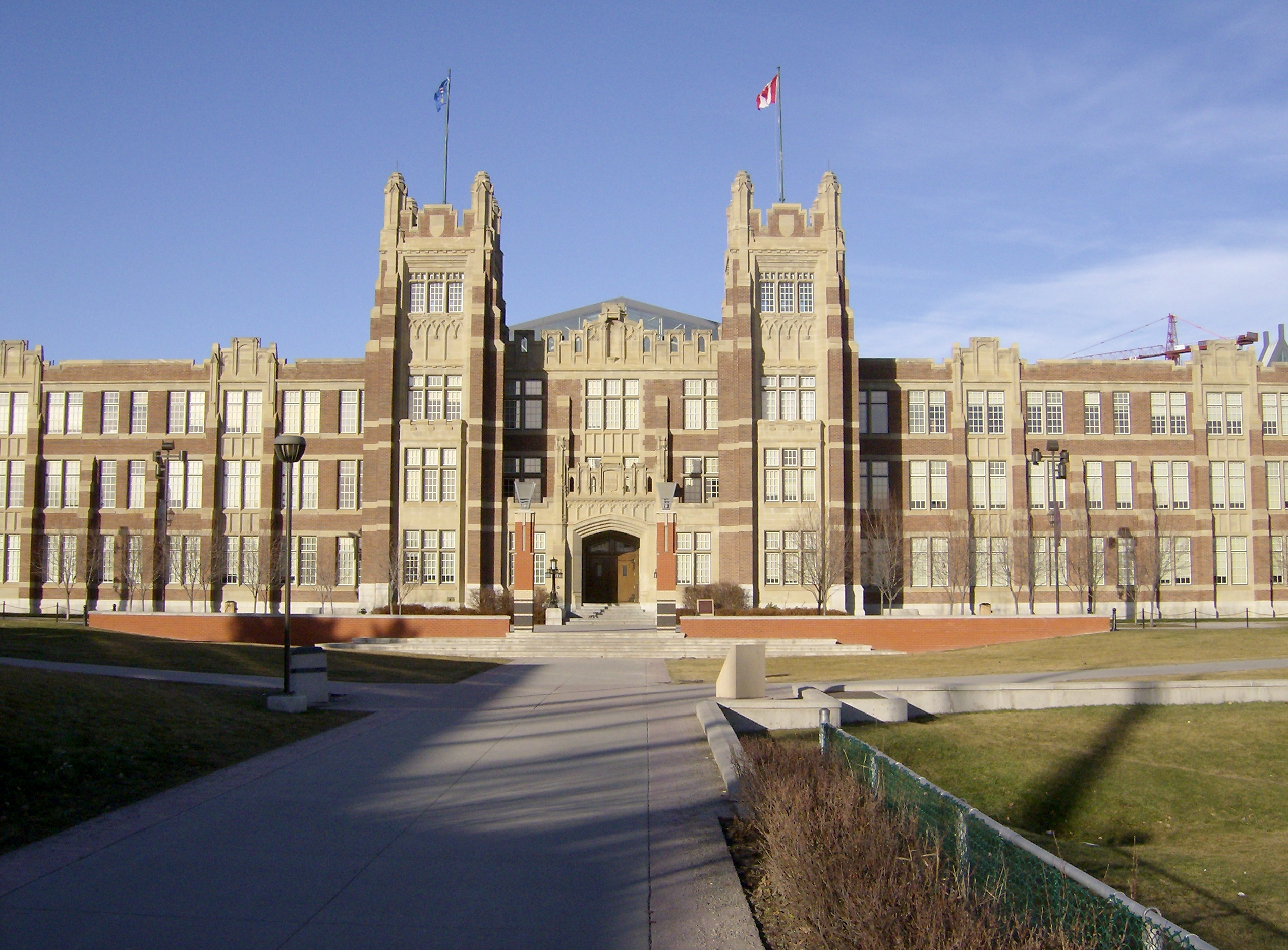
- Motto: Precision, Perseverance, Progress
- Type: Institute of technology
- Active: 1916–1960 (split into two institutions)
- Principal: Ernest William Wood (1952-1962)
- Academic staff: 158 (full-time day staff, 1959-60)
- Students: 2,300 (1959-60)
- Location: Calgary, Alberta, Canada
- Campus: Urban

The Provincial Institute of Technology and Art (PITA) was a technical training post-secondary institution that operated in Calgary, Alberta, between 1916 and 1960. It was the predecessor institution of both the Alberta University of the Arts and Southern Alberta Institute of Technology.

== Founding ==
After the University of Alberta was awarded to Strathcona (now Edmonton) by the Government of Alberta in 1906, Calgary's political and commercial leaders began exploring ways of introducing a similar institution to their city. A short-lived private institution, Calgary College, opened in 1911, backed by local entrepreneurs including William Tregillus.

This, along with pressure from lobbyists, prompted the province to commission a report in October 1914, led by Robert Falconer, into whether Calgary College should be granted the power to confer degrees. In December, Falconer's panel concluded that a technical institute should be established in the City instead, in part due to the submissions of James Collins Miller (PhD), a school principal and technical education advocate. (Having been denied degree-granting powers, Calgary College folded in 1915.)

== Operations ==
=== 1916-1920: Early operations and veteran retraining ===
The Provincial Institute of Technology and Art (PITA) opened on October 16, 1916 with a mandate to meet the "educational needs of the industrial and commercial fields" in Alberta. The first publicly funded technical institute in North America, James Collins Miller was appointed at its first principal, overseeing a staff of seven teachers.

Until 1922, PITA operated out of temporary quarters in what is today the Colonel Walker School (K-6) in Inglewood. Initially, the institute offered full-time courses in auto mechanics and metalworking only, and part-time evening, weekend or correspondence classes in disciplines including mathematics and nursing. Recording a total of 370 students, its first full-time cohort consisted of eleven male students completing an eight-month auto mechanic program; some women also undertook this program on a part-time basis.

At the time of PITA's opening, the First World War was ongoing, with Canada having sent its first troops to Europe two years prior. Miller believed PITA should focus on retraining returning veterans. In 1917, the federal Military Hospitals Commission assumed control of its operations, pausing all civilian enrolments. Under Miller's leadership, PITA's veteran retraining activities were so successful that representatives of the United States government visited the facility to observe. Operations were briefly interrupted in October 1918, when Calgary recorded its first cases of the Spanish Flu. PITA was requisitioned by the Department of Health for one month to serve as a flu hospital.

In 1919, the provincial government, anticipating that PITA would soon accommodate civilian students again, began looking for a permanent location. More room was also required for the Calgary Normal School, a teacher-training institute that would eventually become the University of Calgary in 1966. The province decided to purchase 110 acres of farmland owned by the Riley family in North Hill for a sum of $63,000. In return for forgiveness on an additional $30,000 owed in back taxes, Thomas E. Riley donated additional land.

In November 1920, PITA opened again to students of all backgrounds, with a recorded enrolment of 28 full-time students, 103 evening students and 97 correspondence students. Electrical engineering, tractor engineering and motor mechanics proved the most popular with full-time and evening students alike; telegraphy also reportedly attracted a large share of evening students. PITA also began conducting outreach to prospective students based in rural Alberta.

=== 1921-1939: Establishment of campus, interwar period and Great Depression ===
Construction began on a building for PITA, which had become known locally as "The Tech," in 1921. Clarence Hollingworth, a 6-year-old resident of Calgary, lived across the street from the construction site, and attended the ceremonial laying of the cornerstone. Hollingworth would go on to become first an electrical student at PITA in 1933, then a teacher there for in 1952; he taught for 28 years. Upon his death at the age of 107 in 2023, Hollingworth was the oldest known alumnus of PITA (and SAIT).

PITA's building opened in 1922, which is today known as SAIT's Heritage Hall. The Calgary Normal School occupied the west wing of the building while PITA occupied the east wing, separated by a joint library. A students' union (today known as SAITSA) was established to provide for "literary, athletic and social activities" outside of the classroom environment. In 1926, PITA established an arts department that would go on to become the Alberta University of the Arts.

Between 1929 and 1939, during the economic downturn of the Great Depression, PITA experienced a drop in enrolment. Only the Arts department weathered the period relatively unscathed: enrolments increased throughout the Depression, and it was the only program to maintain paid evening classes. Cheaper programs, such as music and drama, were also comparatively less impacted. Beginning in 1933, PITA offered free evening courses for some programs, in a bid to assist residents of Calgary who could not find work; these classes were taught by instructors on a voluntary basis. Furthermore, PITA's cafeteria offered free lunches to women and children in need.

=== 1940-1945: Second World War ===
In 1940, the Royal Canadian Air Force displaced PITA and the Normal School as part of Canada's efforts during the Second World War. The space was used to house a wireless radio operator training facility, as part of the British Commonwealth Air Training Plan. The No. 2 Wireless Training School opened on September 16, 1940 and ran until April 14, 1945. The main building was used to train 8,000 wireless operators, and twenty-six wooden barracks and service buildings, including a hospital, were constructed on the grounds.

During the war, most PITA classes were taught on the grounds of the Calgary Stampede. Students were taught beneath grandstands. Art classes, and classes for women, moved into Coste House, a mansion in Mount Royal that had been repossessed by the City of Calgary due to unpaid property taxes. PITA returned to the North Hill campus in 1945, except for its arts department, which returned in 1946.

=== 1945-60: Becoming the Southern Alberta Institute of Technology ===
Towards the end of the Second World War, the federal government proposed the introduction of government-sponsored apprenticeship programs, with costs shared between national and provincial authorities. Alberta accordingly introduced an apprenticeship system in 1945, and tasked PITA to offer programs within this framework. PITA accepted its first apprentices in 1948, enrolling 42 overall. Total enrolment for the 1948-49 academic year stood at 1,496 students.

By the 1951-52 academic year, PITA employed 74 full-time staff and 57 part-time staff to accommodate a total enrolment of 2,696 students, of which 1,293 were full-time learners. PITA also recorded 657 apprentices. To provide for the steady increase in student demand, PITA constructed two more permanent buildings on its grounds over the 1950s: the Thomas Riley and John Ware buildings. A significant number of graduates returned to PITA to teach or work: between 1927 and 1952, "some former 121 former Tech students... jointed the staff of the Institute in one capacity or other."

In the late 1950s, the provincial government began to anticipate that a growing number of students would complete grade 12 and subsequently seek various forms of tertiary education. Alberta was also experiencing success in exporting natural resources, resulting in growing demand for technically educated workers. As of 1959, Canada had just two technical training institutes: PITA, and the Toronto-based Ryerson Institute of Technology (now Toronto Metropolitan University). Therefore, the Albertan government announced that year that it would found the Northern Alberta Institute of Technology (NAIT) to supplement existing apprentice and vocational courses.

PITA was renamed to the Southern Alberta Institute of Technology (SAIT), and its trades and technical programs were separated from its art department, which received the name of the Alberta College of Art. Although the College technically remained under SAIT's authority, its department head Illingworth Kerr had petitioned for the department to receive a "distinct name" as an initial step towards securing greater autonomy for the operation. Successive department heads continued Kerr's work, culminating in the College becoming the independent Alberta University of the Arts in 1985. PITA's final president, Ernest William Wood, had assumed the role in 1952 after serving as a teacher at the institute for 22 years. As an instructor, he had taught "almost every course offered" by PITA, including drafting, English and physics. Wood oversaw PITA's transition into SAIT until his sudden death in 1962.

== Academic programs ==
=== Aeronautics ===
PITA offered aeronautics programs beginning in 1929-30, which SAIT continued to offer after post-1960. In 1934, the program incorporated a training course that tasked students with designing and constructing an airplane, the first of its kind in Canada. Under the supervision of instructor Stanley Green, students built a replica 1909 Bleriot aircraft in 1953. This plane successfully conducted a flight across the Channel from France to England in 1956.

=== Arts ===
PITA's arts department, founded 1926, would not have a full-time instructor until 1929, when Alfred Crocker Leighton was appointed as its Head. Four certificate courses were offered: 'elementary,' or entry-level courses; 'fine art'; 'commercial'; and 'applied arts and crafts.' Students who completed the requisite amount and combination of certificates qualified for a diploma, which typically took four years, of which students spent two in residence. Leighton ran a summer school in Kananaskis for select art students in 1933 and 1934. By 1935, demand was high enough that the program became part of the Banff Centre for Arts and Creativity.

Marion Nicoll enrolled as a student in 1929, the same year of Leighton's installment. She became the first woman to serve as a permanent arts teacher at PITA in 1933. She taught there until 1965, leading the School of Crafts and achieving the status of being one of the most nationally recognized artists on staff. During her time there, the School of Painting only had male instructors, including James Stanford Perrott (who had been Nicoll's student), Henry G. Glyde, Walter Phillips, and Illingworth Kerr.

=== Dressmaking and Millinery ===
Twenty-one students enrolled for the launch of PITA's two-year Industrial Dressmaking and Millinery program, the purpose of which was to "train girls to act as capable sales-ladies" and qualify them to "take charge of a ladies' department in a store." Between the 1930s and 1940s, required reading for students included the text, "Vocational Arithmetic for Girls." The program as an individual diploma was discontinued in 1959.
