= Bartol (surname) =

Bartol is a surname. Notable people with the name include:

- Agnieszka Bartol (born 1974), Polish politician
- Alana Bartol (born 1981), Canadian artist
- Cyrus Augustus Bartol (1813–1900), American clergyman and author
- Elizabeth Howard Bartol (1842–1927), American artist
- Harald Bartol (born 1947), Austrian motorcycle racer
- Henry Welchman Bartol, American industrialist whose endowment created the Bartol Research Institute
- James Lawrence Bartol (1813–1887), American jurist
- Margarita Ferrá de Bartol (1935–2013), Argentine politician
- Marica Nadlišek Bartol (1867–1940), Slovenian writer and editor
- Pablo Bartol (born 1965), Uruguayan social entrepreneur, lecturer and politician
- Sören Bartol (born 1974), German politician
- Tilen Bartol (born 1997), Slovenian ski jumper
- Vladimir Bartol (1903–1967), Slovene writer

== See also ==
- Bartol (given name)
