= Joel S. Cohen =

- Born: April 17, 1947 (age 78); The Bronx, New York, U.S.
- Other names: The Sticker Dude
- Occupation(s): Graphic artist, printer
- Known for: Mail art, political art, co-founder of Ragged Edge Press
- Style: Combining images with lyrics, aphorisms, and symbols
- Movement: Influenced by Dada and Fluxus movements

Joel S. Cohen (born April 17, 1947, The Bronx, New York) is an American graphic artist and cofounder, along with Diane E. Milder, of Ragged Edge Press, an independent offset printing company in New York City. Principally recognized for his creative mail art projects and artistic collaborations with Thomas Kerr and Kurt Vonnegut, Cohen has been creating, printing, and distributing progressive political art since the early 1970s.

Influenced by the Dada and Fluxus movements and by the Grateful Dead, Cohen, also known as The Sticker Dude, combines images with lyrics, aphorisms, and symbols to create socially relevant, printed artwork, which is often in the form of stickers, postcards, and stamps. Although Cohen freely distributes his artwork at public events and performances, his ongoing, larger artistic mission is to contribute to an eternal network of mail art projects. Through Ragged Edge Press, Cohen has created more than 500 "Irreverant" rubber stamps, which have been used in hundreds of mail art projects and featured in publications by John Held, Jr.

A member of the International Union of Mail-Artists since 1985, Cohen has organized and contributed to scores of mail art projects and conferences, including the July 10–16, 2006 Dada Week NYC event and the August 3, 2019 snap+share mail art congress at the San Francisco Museum of Modern Art. Cohen's creative works have been archived in mail art collections at the Museum of Modern Art in New York City and Smithsonian Libraries. An archival collection solely devoted to all of Cohen's creative works, including mail art, stickers, postcards, books, posters, and poetry, is available at the University at Buffalo's Special Collections.

== The Oppositional Art of the Printer ==
Joel Cohen’s career has been a remarkable exploration of the art of the oppositional printer. For decades, Cohen has created print materials for social justice groups which combine striking textual and visual elements at low cost or for free, a considerable material aid to such organizations. His body of work deploys pads, buttons, posters, postcards, t-shirts, stickers, booklets, hats, and broadsides in creative support of dissident campaigns.

---Ira Shor, Professor Emeritus, City University of NY Graduate Center

== Publications featuring Cohen's Mail Art ==
- Rusty Clark, ed. Tabloid Trash, No. 6. West Springfield, Massachusetts, 1996.
- Padin, Clemente, ed. Correo Del Sur/Southern Post, No. 4. Montevideo, Uruguay, 2000.
- Cline, Elizabeth, Mark Rodriguez, and Matt Siegle, ed. If the Head Fits, Wear It: Contemporary Art and the Grateful Dead. Los Angeles, California: Honor Simone, 2017.
- Cohen, Joel S. and Irving Wexler, eds. Through the Cracks: A Mini-Journal of Socially Relevant Words and Images, No. 1. New York: Ragged Edge Press, Fall 1991.
- Michael B. Corbett, Editor. Tensetendoned, No. 22. Preston Park, Pennsylvania, February 1995.
- Decie, Joe, ed. Visual Delight v Visual Disaster, Book Two. Nottingham, England: Joe's Art Corner, 1998.
- Delgado, Fernando García, ed. Proyecto 'Vórtice,' No. 13. Buenos Aires, Argentina, September 1998.
- Indian Ralph (a.k.a. Peter Mancusi), ed. The Humboldt Da-Jest. Miranda, California, May 1999.
- Janssen, Ruud, ed. Mail Art Interviews. Tilburg, Holland: TAM (Traveling Art Mail) Archive, 1998. Ruud, ed. Secret Thoughts About Mail Art, Part 8. Tilburg, Holland: TAM (Traveling Art Mail) Publications, April 1998.
- Lenoir, Pascal, ed. Mani Art, No. 109. Grandfresnoy, France, April 1998.
- Miller, Ken, ed. (Shouting at the)Postman, No. 44. ASKalice Art Net, Yardley and Newtown, Pennsylvania, February 2001.
- Nold, Wilfred, ed. Numero, No. 5. Frankfurt, Germany, 1999.
- Simone, Gianni, ed. Kairan: Mail Art Forum, No. 3. Kanagawa-ken, Japan: Johnnyboy Production, May 2001.
- The Ray Johnson Issue. Lightworks Magazine, No. 22. Birmingham, Michigan, 2000.
