= Bartol (given name) =

Bartol or Bartul is a masculine given name, cognate to Bartholomew.

The names Bȃrtol and Bȃrtul are the same as the older form Bartolomej, originating from the names of saints, spread in the Middle Ages from the Byzantium to Venice, and became widespread in Istria and the Croatian Littoral.

Notable people with the name include:

- Bartol of Krbava (fl. 1400–1425), Croatian manuscript illuminator and calligrapher
- Bartol Barišić (born 2003), Croatian footballer
- Bartol Brinkler (1915–1993), American librarian
- Bartul Đurđević (1506–1566), Croatian musicologist and lexicographer
- Bartul Kačić (1572–1645), Croatian clergyman
- Bartol Kašić (1575–1650), Croatian clergyman and grammarian
- Bartol Franjić (born 2000), Croatian footballer
- Bartol Sfondrati (1541–1583), Ragusan Jesuit clergyman of Italian origin

== See also ==
- Sveti Bartol (lit. 'Saint Bartol')
- Sveti Bartul (lit. 'Saint Bartul')
- Bartolomeo
- Bortolo
- Bartol (surname)
