= Bortolo =

Bortolo is a given name. Notable people with the name include:

- Bortolo Belotti (1877–1944), Italian politician
- Bortolo d'Alvise, 16th-century Italian scientific instrument maker
- Bortolo Mutti (born 1954), Italian footballer and manager

== See also ==
- Bortolo Nardini, Italian grappa company
