= Brinkler classification =

Brinkler classification is the library classification system of Bartol Brinkler described in his article "The Geographical Approach to Materials in the Library of Congress Subject Headings". The geographical aspect of a subject may be conveyed through three types of headings labeled A, B, and C. Heading A uses a primary topical description with geographical subdivisions (e.g. Art—Paris). Type B uses a place-name for the main heading with a topical subdivision (e.g. Paris—Description). C headings use a geographical description of a phrase (e.g. Paris Literature).

Brinkler explores what type of heading is more useful to a patron, and he finds that it depends on the level of familiarity a patron has with a topic and what approach they take when searching for resources on their topic. Ideally readers will either be looking for everything on a particular topic, or everything regarding a particular place. Bartol Brinkler investigates a system of classification that will best serve these two ideal types of patrons. He finds working with Type A headings will best assist a patron who is more topic oriented, while using Type B headings is preferable for those who are primarily interested in one place.

However this is problematic in practice. One possibility is to assign Type A and Type B headings to every resource, but the cataloguing cost would be high. A system that aids readers regardless of their approach to a topic involves using cross-references (e.g. Canada—Botany, See Botany—Canada). Admitting that cross references would require more work on the part of librarians, Bartol Brinkler notes that librarians must keep in mind "...readers do not have the same knowledge [of classification] and do need all the help they can get..."
