= John Brocke =

Canadian artist (1953–2009)

- Born: John Gary Joseph Brocke; 4 October 1953; Edmonton, Alberta, Canada
- Died: 17 January 2009 (aged 55); Annapolis Valley, Nova Scotia, Canada
- Education: Alberta College of Art
- Known for: artist
- Spouse: Anna Gardner

John Brocke (4 October 1953 – 17 January 2009) was a Canadian realist artist who had a posthumous retrospective at the Glenbow Museum in Calgary titled Myth Making: The Art of John Brocke (2015). One of its co-curators said of it that the show "was a way for us to start a conversation about an artist …(that) Calgary should be proud of, (who) Canada should know about…".

== Career ==
Brocke was born in Edmonton and grew up there until he was eight years old when he moved to Dawson Creek, British Columbia, with his family. He attended the Alberta College of Art (ACAD) now (Alberta University of the Arts), entering the second year due to advanced standing because of his talent and graduated in 1981. At ACAD he was awarded the Province of Alberta Prize in 1979–1980 and the Talens Canadian Agencies Scholarship in 1980–1981. After graduation in 1982, he received the Elizabeth Greenshields Foundation Art Assistance Grant. He set up his studio, taught night classes at the Alberta College of Art in the Continuing Education program and worked as a scenic painter for film and stage. In 1986, he made a trip to Russia, which was considered life-changing. In 2006, he moved with his wife, Anna, to the Annapolis Valley, Nova Scotia and devoted his time exclusively to painting. In 2009, he died at the age of 55 due to a car accident.

== Work ==
Brocke's realist canvases are characterized by their large scale, small textured brushstrokes of layered colour combined with Brocke's reverence for light, life and mystery. References to a spiritual world became more pronounced in the enigmatic imagery of Brocke's later work.

Brocke's art is defined by his devotion to detail and paint construction. His paintings took several months to create. They have been described by the Calgary Herald as movies that do not move. They are personal, quiet, playful and figurative paintings created in the 1980s, when artwork like this was considered unimportant or perhaps, unfashionable

From Brocke's graduation from ACAD in 1981 to around 1993, he only created around 25 paintings, 18 of which (along with one drawing) were featured in the show Myth Making: The Art of John Brocke (2015). His surviving paintings are appreciated for their rarity as well as for their quality.

Canadian Art magazine described Brocke's work as "another sort of mythology. His Epoch (1991) depicts four men and four horses in a forest that might be medieval if there were not a helicopter hovering above. His other-worldly narratives with their hugeness and meticulous detail create an eerie drama." The painting was also described by Globe and Mail, who wrote that its "marriage of medieval and modern apocalyptic millennialism resonates long after one has left the gallery". In 2015, Epoch was purchased by an anonymous Calgary collector and stayed in Alberta, where it is on display at Bow Valley College in Calgary.

Brocke's paintings are discussed in a film made to accompany Myth Making: The Art of John Brocke at the Glenbow Museum in Calgary in 2015 by Glenbow's guest curator, Douglas MacLean, and Brocke's widow, Anna Gardner, which is available online.

== Selected exhibitions ==
- 1985: group exhibition Young Calgary Realists, Canadian Art Galleries, Calgary;
- 1985: Contemporary, a celebration of art during the Winter Olympics;
- 1985: Three artists from Calgary, Wynick/Tuck Gallery, Toronto;
- 1989: Seven Paintings by John Brocke, Mira Godard Gallery, Toronto;
- 1992: People's Art, Loch Gallery, Toronto;
- 2015: Myth Making: The Art of John Brocke, Glenbow Museum, Calgary.

== Selected collections ==
- Alberta Foundation for the Arts;
- Glenbow Museum, Calgary;
- Collection of TC Energy.

== Commissions ==
- 2006; Brocke painted the official portrait of the Speaker of the Senate, Hon. Dan Hays.

== Legacy ==
- John Brocke Scholarship Fund at the Alberta University of the Arts.
