= Norman Yates =

Canadian artist (1923–2014)

- Born: Edward Norman Yates; July 23, 1923; Calgary, Alberta
- Died: February 9, 2014 (aged 90); Victoria, BC
- Education: Ontario College of Art (graduated 1951)
- Known for: artist, educator, arts advocate
- Spouse: Whynona Yates (1926-1998)

Norman Yates RCA (September 23, 1923 – February 09, 2014) was a painter in washes of colour of panoramic abstract and semi-abstract paintings that he called "landspaces". His themes were space and energy. In 2023, Patricia Bovey said that his landscapes are "flowing, evocative, ephemeral and always changing, reflecting the intangibility of the light, skies, and atmospheric effects". She added that his paintings are significant works in the annals of Western Canadian Art.

== Career ==
Yates was born in Calgary and grew up in Regina. After four years of service as a radar technician in the Royal Canadian Air Force during the Second World War, he attended the Ontario College of Art, graduating in 1951. After 3 years in Toronto, in 1954, he was hired to teach in the University of Alberta's department of arts and design in Edmonton where he remained until he retired in 1989.

In 1972, Yates and his family moved to a large treed tract of land near Tomahawk, 96 kilometres west of Edmonton where he experienced an overwhelming sense of space. At much the same time, he discovered the work of J. M. W. Turner and he studied it in depth. Both the new place for his painting and Turner influenced his subsequent paintings.

During the 1970s, Yates served as an arts advocate and social activist, establishing the Alberta branch of the Canadian Society for Education Through Art, chairing the Alberta Foundation for the Arts, serving on the Western Canada Art Council and trying to prevent the demolition of older homes in his neighborhood. But having decided his activism was useless, in 1989, Yates and his wife moved to Victoria, BC.

== Selected exhibitions ==
- Allied Arts Centre, solo exhibition of 15 paintings, oils and acrylics, 1965;
- Edmonton Art Gallery, Norman Yates, 1973;
- Alberta Foundation for the Arts, Alberta Art: Exhibition of Art Works from the Collection of the Alberta Art Foundation = Exposition d'oeuvres provenant de la collection de la Fondation des arts de l'Alberta, 1975;
- Ring House Gallery, Edmonton, Alta, Norman Yates: Toward Landscape, 1983.
- Prairie Gallery, Grande Prairie Alta, Polarities: North/South and in Between: An Exhibition of Contemporary Artworks by 21 Alberta Artists, 1989.
- Two Rivers Gallery, Prince George, BC, Norman Yates: landscape in the 21th century: selection from the 1st decade, 2010.

== Honours and awards ==
- Canada Council Senior Arts Award, 1967, 1975;
- Executive of the University Art Association of Canada, 1971–1973;
- City of Edmonton Performing and Creative Arts Award, 1972;
- Chairman Alberta Foundation for the Arts, Edmonton, 1976–1977;
- Albera Achievement Award for in Excellence in Art;
- Rutherford Award for Excellence in Teaching, 1986;
- CARFAC [Canadian Artists Representation/le Front des Artistes Canadiens] life achievement award, 2003;

== Selected public collections ==
- National Gallery of Canada;
- Alberta Foundation for the Arts;
- Art Gallery of Alberta;
- Vancouver Art Gallery;
- University of Alberta Art Museums Art Collection;

== Commissions ==
- Murals, West and North, 202 four-by-eight-foot plywood planks, exterior of the Education Building, University of Alberta;
- Interior work for the Stanley Milner Library in Edmonton;
- Mural on the Amoco Building, Calgary;
