= Lyndal Osborne =

Canadian artist

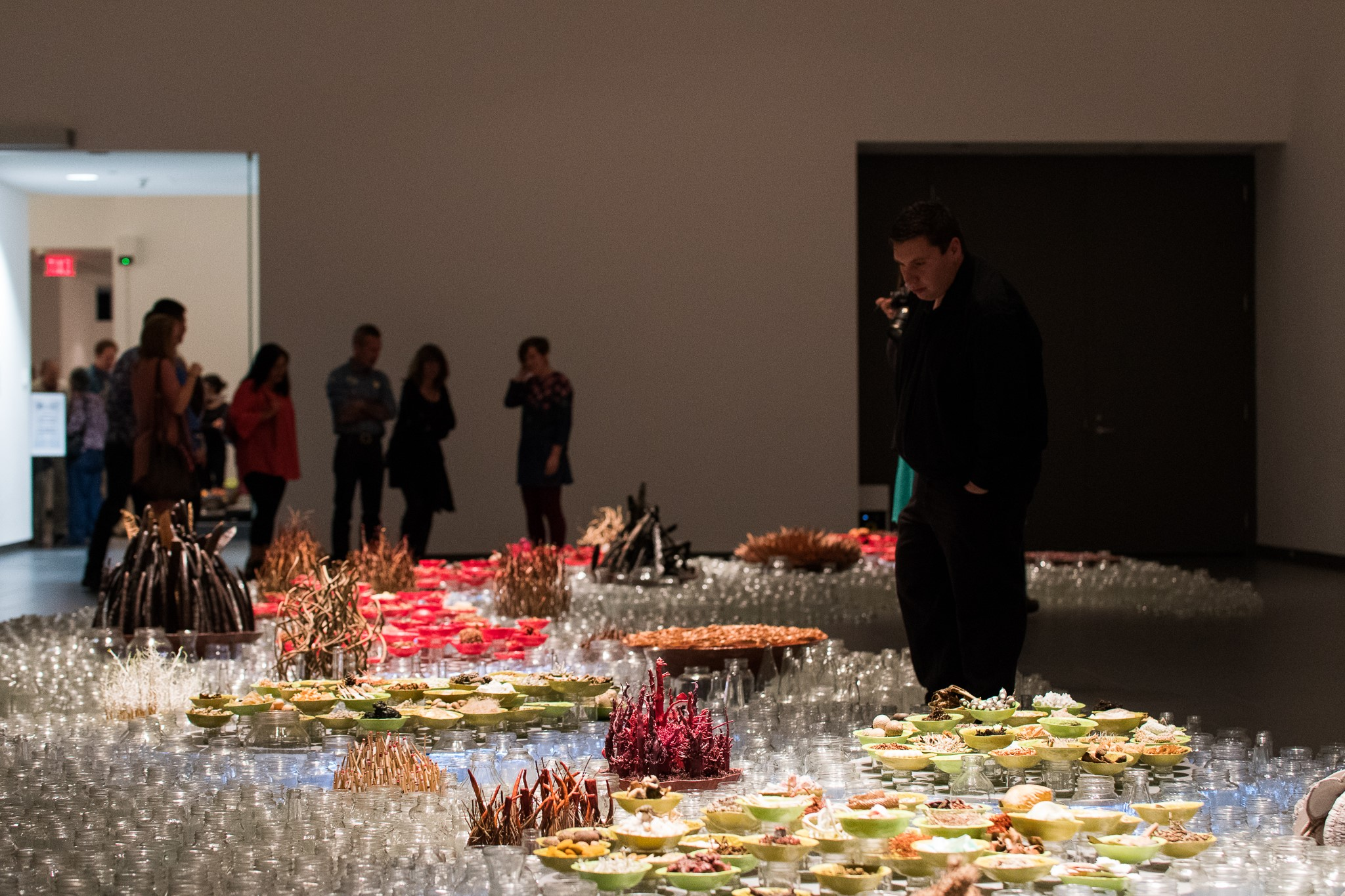
- Opening reception of Metaphors for Evolution at the Art Gallery of Grande Prairie (September 29, 2017)
- Born: 1940 (age 85–86); Newcastle, Australia
- Education: National Art School, Sydney, AU and University of Wisconsin-Madison, US
- Known for: Installation artist, multimedia artist
- Movement: Bioart

Lyndal Osborne RCA (born 1940) is a Canadian artist based in Edmonton, Alberta. Her works include BioArt, Sculpture, Video art, and multimedia. She applies many different artistic methods and often uses recycled or found objects as her materials. Osborne's' installation work speaks of the forces of transformation within nature and provides a commentary on issues relating to the environment. In her more recent works, Osborne has also examined the issues of genetically modified organisms as subject matter.

== Career ==
Osborne was born in Newcastle, New South Wales, Australia and studied at the National Art School in Sydney, Australia, where she received a BA in 1961. She also received her MFA in printmaking from the University of Wisconsin-Madison in 1971. After finishing her education in Wisconsin, Lyndal Osborne moved to Edmonton, the city where she continues to live and create art. Her location in central Alberta is integral to much of her artistic process as she utilizes the dry heat of the region to mummify materials which would otherwise quickly rot and decay. Osborne is now a professor emeritus at the University of Alberta in Edmonton, Canada. Her works are in 75 public collections nationally and internationally, including the National Gallery of Canada.

== Selected solo exhibitions ==
- 2002 Geographies & Objects of Enticement, Kelowna Art Gallery, Kelowna, BC
- 2004 L'oeuvre au naturel ou du naturel l'oeuve, Musee Regional de Rimouski, Rimouski, QC
- 2006 Garden, Art Gallery of Calgary, Calgary, AB
- 2010 ab ovo, Dunlop Art Gallery, Regina, SK
- 2013 Cabinets of Curiosities, BMO World of Creativity, Art Gallery of Alberta, Edmonton, AB
- 2014 Lyndal Osborne Bowerbird: Life As Art, Art Gallery of Alberta, Edmonton, AB
- 2015 Cabinets of Curiosity, Glenbow Museum, Calgary, AB
- 2016 Lyndal Osborne Shoalwan: River Through Fire, River of Ice, The Reach, Abbotsford, BC
- 2016 Coevolution, Vernon Public Art Gallery, Vernon, BC
- 2017 Metaphors for Evolution, Art Gallery of Grande Prairie, Grande Prairie, AB
- 2018 Mutation of the Commons, Nickle Galleries, Calgary, AB

== Selected awards ==
- 1998 Elected Member, Royal Canadian Academy of Art
- 2004 Performance Award, Salute to Excellence, City of Edmonton
- 2005 Helen Collision Award, Edmonton Artists Trust Fund
- 2006 Alberta Centennial Medal
- 2006 Salute to Excellence Award, City of Edmonton
- 2016 Atco Gas Award for Outstanding Lifetime Achievement
