= Sharon Christian =

Canadian artist (1950–2015)

- Born: June 11, 1950; Stettler, Alberta, Canada
- Died: July 6, 2015 (aged 64–65)
- Known for: Painter, Sculptor

Sharon Christian (June 11, 1950 – July 6, 2015; also known by her married name, Sharon Holmes) was a Canadian artist known for her paintings and sculptures, many of which document intimate encounters with nature.

Christian developed a unique style "beyond realism" through which she advanced a number of themes including the tension between urban and natural environments, and the relationships between contemporary art (including music), historical traditions, and individual experience. Christian documented the changing landscape and demographics of Western Canada.

== Early life ==
Christian was born in Alberta and was most active in Western Canada: in Calgary and West Vancouver. She studied at the University of Calgary and the Alberta College of Art.

== Career ==
Christian was elected into the Canadian Society for Painters in Water Colour in 1980, and showed regularly as a signature member in CSPWC shows. Three of Christian's pieces, acquired in 1977, 1984, and 1990, are included in the Alberta Foundation for the Arts: Summer Haze and A Time of Festivity (under her married name, Sharon Holmes), and Hitching up Barney and Big Boy.

Christian came to attention in the 1980s, with reviews by the art historian Brooks Joyner in the Calgary Herald and by Carol Fleming in the journal Arts West. Joyner wrote: "Holmes’ paintings deal with rural artifacts as they are overcome by nature. She feels the earth reclaims her own, the elements and the seasons gather and enfold these discards, making them beautiful as they take on a patina of green, russet and gold.’ The art movement New Sincerity, dating to the early 1980s, was similarly concerned with breaking away from post-modern irony and cynicism. The artist was represented by the Masters Gallery and the Wallace Galleries, in Calgary. Under the name Holmes, the artist illustrated the book "Early prairie remedies" (the book was printed in two editions; the second reprinting was titled "The Pioneer Remedies").

Christian's 1992 exhibition at the Ferry Building Art Gallery in West Vancouver was the focus of a full episode of the nationally televised program Much West/Much Music, hosted by Terry David Mulligan. The last public exhibition during her lifetime was reviewed by Michela Garstin in 2013.

Christian was selected by Maureen McTeer, the wife of the Canadian Prime Minister, to be part of a group of artists to promote Canadian art, reported by the Zena Cherry, the society columnist for The Globe and Mail. The artist's work was collected by Norma Gibson for the Corporate Collection of Gulf Canada Resources.

== Death ==
Christian died of cancer on July 6, 2015.
