= Dean Drever =

Canadian sculptor (born 1970)

- Born: July 14, 1970 (age 55); Edmonton, Alberta, Canada
- Education: Alberta College of Art and Design, Calgary, Alberta, Canada
- Known for: Sculptor

Dean Drever (born 1970) is a Canadian sculptor. He graduated from the Alberta College of Art and Design in Calgary, Alberta in 1997. He currently lives and works in Toronto, Ontario.

Drever's most notable sculpture is Bear with Salmon, commissioned by Qualico Developments for the Epcor Tower in Edmonton, Alberta. Installation of the sculpture began in 2012 and was not completed until 2014 due to building construction delays. The Epcor Tower is the first multi-story skyscraper to be built in Edmonton in 20 years.

== Artistic practice ==
Drever's art draws upon an abstract minimalist tradition in the vein of such twentieth century artists such as Robert Davidson, Donald Judd, Anish Kapoor, and Wolfgang Laib. The work reflects a keen regard for detail and a seamless level of finish. In reference to Big Guns (2008), Lee Henderson writes, "Drever's observation that our desire for luxury and perfection is like a sugar-coating over the ruthlessness of the military engine might still be an important reminder for the art world that the value we place on beauty can sometimes cost us our peace."

Drever's sculptures are seductively sparse and calm, but also charged with content that empowers the viewer to consider how they are involved in art production. It is not the works themselves that are the site of discomfort, but rather the viewer's tension between the desire to look and the desire to refuse recognition of complicity, comprehension, and arousal.

Drever offers a dialogue about the ways in which individuals are implicated in the act of bearing witness to violence of any kind. In the case of many of his sculptures, the self is seen in beautifully rendered abstractions of social problematics. "What happens when we believe in something will all our hearts at the risk of inflicting pain upon others? How do we utilize emblematic objects and images to unify participation in cultural practices associated with absolute power and jealous conviction?"

Repressed anger in individuals and social groups who espouse beliefs that threaten or endanger the freedom of others are central themes in Drever's work. "When he argues that society is hypocritical when it deems state sanctioned cruelty acceptable while similar tactics used by street gangs are unacceptable, I have the creeping feeling that he is not arguing for less violence, just less hypocrisy."

== Works ==
Explicit violence, in the form of weapons is examined in pieces such as Instructional Bat Series (aluminum and wood bats with engraved text, e.g.,"Punish One Teach A Hundred"). Concealed violence is inscribed inconspicuously in ideologies of institutional domination associated with church, school, judiciary, etc. Ten Commandment Wrench Set is a set of stainless steel wrenches engraved with scriptural behavioral codes. "Instructional Bat Series carries a dual meaning, conjuring up the great summer past time but also images of The Sopranos, gangs and mob justice."

A piece such as tlakwa speaks to a more ambiguous kind of oppression, whereby matrices of race, power and servility are made visible in something as seemingly innocuous as a commemorative coin. Robert Enright, curator of a survey show of Drever's work entitled, Everything is going to be OK again soon, says of Drever: "Dean’s main interests are issues of power, violence and racism. Those are pretty heavy topics, but we believe art is serious business and if you can’t talk about some of our greatest challenges and the things that influence most directly as a society with art, how can you talk about it? Art is free to talk about everything."

Black and White v. 1 and Black and White v. 2 explore the reciprocal function of power within cultural identification, specifically, the variations between individual freedom and social oppression. Black Klan consists of 7,686 individually cut sheets of paper, stacked to result in an imposing life-size figure of a Klansman, who is essentially teetering under its own ideology. Writes Drever: "The greater the desire for control over others, the more individual freedom is threatened. Even the subtlest forms of coercion that serve to maintain structures of authority and supremacy for some, are experiences of violence and oppression for others."

Bear Minimum, Bear Hunt, and Bear with Salmon take this consideration further by exploring the power of nature. Many cultures hold the bear as a symbol of purity, strength, dominance and authority. Haida culture believes the bear is a supreme being, embodying both extraordinary physical and supernatural powers. Bears represent strength and dominance, and at the same time, they evoke notions of surrender and humility. Speaking to the exhibit of Bear Hunt at the Toronto Sculpture Garden (a variation also shown simultaneously at the 2010 Vancouver Olympics), Drever says, "The bears are doing the hunting. They've come to the city, and now they're departing." Bear Minimum, part of the art collection of The Government of Canada, interprets the power of bears in another way. Says Drever, "I've always been interested in oppositions and so I didn't want to make the animals wild and aggressive. I decided to take the big-bad-bear idea and soften it."

Pass the Hat (wood) (2014) is a 20 ft. totem pole commissioned by Jim Shaw. According to Drever, "In Pass the Hat (wood and paper), I document the strength of the enduring symbols of my Haida heritage, while addressing it's fragility due to colonial practices of abuse and domination. In this work, I am the thunderbird who is placing a Watchman's hat upon the head of the bear/human, who is my daughter. As I pass the hat to her, I am giving her knowledge of our culture and lineage. I am sharing the ways in which we communicate and express ourselves through art. As I give myself to her, she becomes the power of the thunderbird, the watchman, and the bear all at once, and in turn, she is responsible for carrying on the traditions of our people. As she watches over her generation, I watch over her."

Pass the Hat (paper) (2014) is made using 10,886 pieces of stacked paper. The process reconstitutes traditional totem pole construction through contemporary industrial processes. It does the same with industrial and digital processes themselves by transposing the subordinate position of culture to technology. In this way, it encompasses and addresses changing practices and points to the interpenetration of industry and culture and imagination and reason. "Both in its concept and material processes, Pass the Hat plots a complicated path between cultural translation and cultural adaptation in life as well as art."

== Exhibitions ==
Drever has exhibited in numerous group and solo shows across Canada and internationally. In recent years he had a major solo exhibition at the Edmonton Art Gallery, and has shown at White Columns in New York City, Cooper Gallery in Dundee, Scotland and the MacKenzie Art Gallery in Saskatchewan. Drever's large-scale public sculptures can be seen in many Canadian cities, including his installation Bear Hunt (2009) at the Toronto Sculpture Garden and Bear with Salmon (2014) at the Epcor Tower in Edmonton.

== Recognition ==
In 2004, Drever was shortlisted for the Sobey Art Foundation Award and the Enbridge Emerging artist Award. In 2009, he was nominated for the K.M. Hunter Artist Award for Visual Art.

== Bibliography ==
- Garneau, David. (2011) Making it like a man. Waterloo Ontario: Wilfrid Laurier University Press. 40 p. ISBN 9781554583270
- Łukasz Gorczyca; Michał Kaczyński. (2014) Villa Toronto. Warsaw Poland: Fundacja Raster. ISBN 9788393824465
