= Mireille Perron =

Mireille Perron (born 1957) is a Canadian visual artist, writer, scholar, and assistant professor at Alberta University of the Arts (AUArts) based in Calgary, Alberta. Born in Montreal, Quebec, Perron has been exhibiting widely across Canada, the United States, and Europe since 1982, and has published over 80 essays relating to visual art and craft and has been faculty at ACAD since 1990.

== Education ==
Perron holds a Bachelor of Arts and an MA in art history from Université de Montréal, a Diploma in Ceramic Technology from John Abbott College, and a Diploma in Fine Arts from Collège du Vieux-Montréal.

== Career ==
Mireille Perron has taught at several institutions throughout her career. Perron was Head of the Ceramics Department at the Saidye Bronfman School of Fine Arts from 1984 to 1989, then taught at the University of Calgary from 1989 to 1993. Since 1990, she has been teaching at the Alberta University of the Arts where she became a permanent faculty member in 1996.

=== Visual arts ===
Perron has exhibited extensively across Canada, The United States and Europe both in group and solo exhibitions. Recent exhibitions include Prise de Position/Having a viewpoint, a permanent display in Villenauxe, France, 2009, The Spiral, an installation in Newtown Castle, Burren College of Art, Ireland, 2011 and The Laboratory of Feminists Pataphysics presents Ateliers of the Near Future, at Stride Gallery, Calgary, Canada, 2010.

In 2000, Perron founded The Laboratory of Feminist 'Pataphysics, which made its first appearance at the Nickle Arts Museum for Perron's solo exhibition titled Les Belles Ratoureuses / The Beautiful Pranksters curated by Christine Sowiak. The Laboratory of Feminist Pataphysics is an ongoing series of "social experiments masquerading as artworks/events". Perron showed a survey of The Laboratory of Feminist Pataphysics at The New Gallery in 2007 and exhibited The Laboratory of Feminists Pataphysics presents Ateliers of the Near Future, in which Perron invited 13 emerging artists to respond to the installations in the exhibition, at Stride Gallery in 2010.

=== Writing ===
Perron has published over 80 essays related to visual arts and craft including:

- Of Word, of Skin, with Kim Huynh, Leonard and Bina Ellen Art Gallery, Mireille Perron, The New Gallery, Access Centre Art Gallery, published by Kim Huynh in 2001.
- The Art of camouflage, A Female Touch, Exploring tactility in the work of Janice Wright Cheney, Barb Hunt and Sarah Maloney, published by Stride Gallery in 2007.
- Medical Tabulae: Visual Arts and Medical Representation, with Allister Neher in RACAR: revue d'art canadienne / Canadian Art Review in 2008.
- Making Noise with forgotten punctuation marks, spoiled syllables, clipped sentences, infected paragraphs, and mere mouthing, edited by Jessica Wyman published by YYZBOOKS in 2008.
