= Bartol Brinkler =

American cataloging librarian

- Brinkler ca. 1937
- Education: Princeton University; Columbia University
- Occupation: Librarian

Bartol Brinkler (October 2, 1915 – October 2, 1993) was a cataloging librarian, the head of cataloging and classification at Harvard University's Widener Library. He received a MA and a Ph.D. from Princeton Graduate School. He graduated in 1937. He was also a graduate of the library school at Columbia University.

From 1947 to 1982, Brinkler worked at Widener Library as head of classification and cataloging. In 1976, he trained all the catalogers at Widener Library on the Library of Congress Classification system. Brinkler also served as a "consultant on classification (…this included the construction of a special classification system & supervision of reclassification for Dumbarton Oaks Research Library, Washington, DC, [19]59-60, and J.K.Kennedy-Institut für Amerikastudien".

He devised a modification of the Library of Congress Classification system, known as the Brinkler classification system, to bring out better the geographical aspects of the subject in the context of a card catalog.

Brinkler died on 2 October 1993. He is remembered in the Princeton Alumni Weekly as a "quiet librarian".
