= Elizabeth Howard Bartol =

American painter and sculptor (1842–1927)

- Born: 1842; Boston, Massachusetts
- Died: 1927 (aged 84–85); Boston, Massachusetts

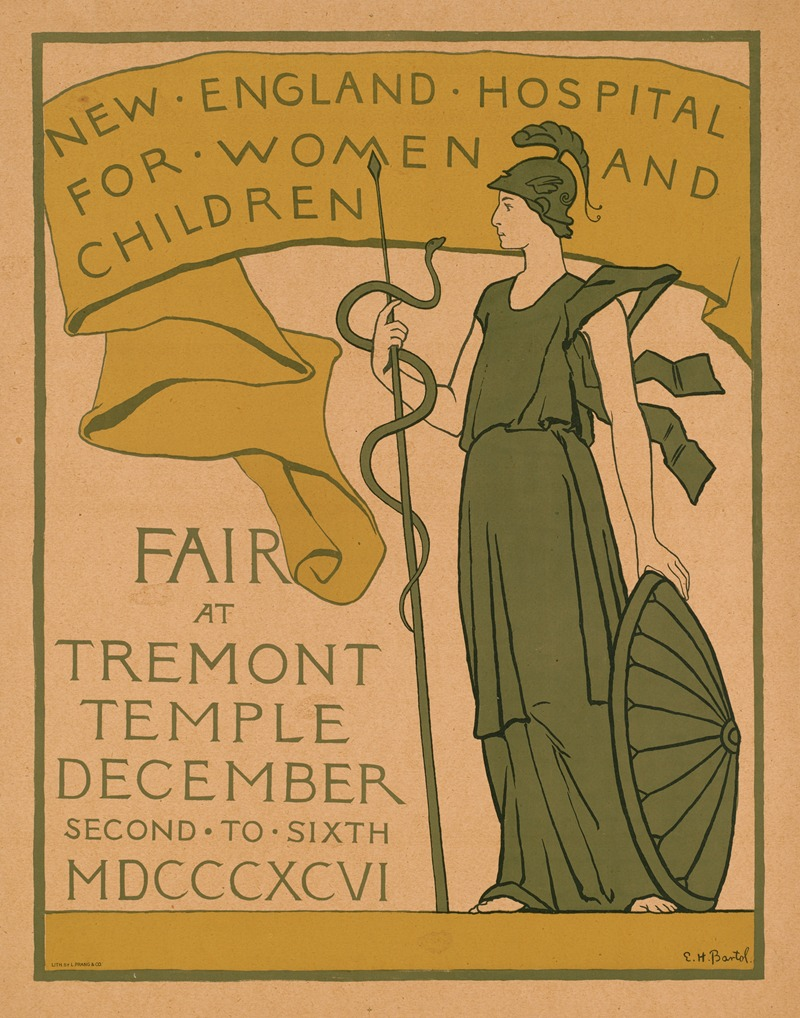
Bartol – New England hospital for women & children poster 1896

Elizabeth Howard Bartol (1842–1927) was an American artist.

Bartol was born in 1842 in Boston, Massachusetts. She was the daughter of Unitarian minister Cyrus Augustus Bartol. She studied at the Boston School of Design. Her teachers included William Morris Hunt, William Rimmer, and Stephen Salisbury Tuckerman.

Bartol exhibited at the Boston Art Club and the National Academy of Design.

Bartol died in 1927 in Boston.

Bartol was included in the 2001 exhibition catalog from A Studio of Her Own: Boston Women Artists, 1870–1940 at the Museum of Fine Arts Boston.
