= Elaine Cameron-Weir =

Canadian artist

Elaine Cameron-Weir (born 1985 in Alberta, Canada) is a contemporary visual artist known for her industrial and conceptually driven sculptural practice. As of 2024, she currently lives and works in New York City.

== Early life ==
Elaine Cameron-Weir was born in Alberta, Canada in 1985.

Cameron-Weir received an BFA in Drawing from Alberta College of Art and Design in 2007. She received an MFA in Studio Art from New York University in 2010.

== Career ==
Cameron-Weir has exhibited internationally with solo exhibitions including "exhibit from a dripping personal collection" at Dortmunder Kunstverein in Dortmund, Germany, "viscera has questions about itself" at New Museum in New York, New York, "Dressing for Windows (Exploded View)" at SCAD Museum of Art in Savannah, Georgia, "STAR CLUB REDEMPTION BOOTH" at Henry Art Gallery in Seattle, Washington, and "Outlooks: Elaine Cameron-Weir" at Storm King Art Center in New Windsor, New York. In 2023, Cameron-Weir was also commissioned by the Celine Art Project to create a sculpture for Celine's Miami Flagship store.

Her work has also been featured in major group exhibitions such as the Fifty-Ninth Venice Biennale, "New Time: Art and Feminisms in the 21st Century" at Berkeley Art Museum and Pacific Film Archive at University of California Berkeley, "Present Tense" at the Philadelphia Museum of Art (2019), as well as the Belgrade Biennale, Serbia (2021), the Montreal Biennial, Canada (2017), and the Fellbach Triennial of Small-Scale Sculpture, Germany (2016).

== Work ==
In her practices, Elaine Cameron-Weir grapples with questions of individual and collective human survival, while also considering the potential for renewal and transformation in states of being and forms of knowledge. Her work is informed by belief systems that structure how people make sense of and meaning in the world, from science and religion to nationalism. Symmetry, sleekness, and industrial materials define Cameron-Weir's sculptures. Her sculptures incorporate objects repurposed from their scientific, medical, military, or faith-giving function into reliquaries or representations of larger systems of belief and power. Materials can also be ephemeral, incorporating heat, light and scent, suggesting transformative processes. Cameron-Weir’s integration of scents into her artwork often calls upon their meanings in a greater cultural memory, choosing scents such as frankincense, labdanum, and myrrh, that evoke rich histories, ritual, and myth.

Cameron-Weir has an established parallel writing practice in step with her artworks. Her writing often serves as a preparatory sketch, poetic prose or found “raw text” culled from various sources, establishing a source from which the artworks and often their titles, spring forth from. Cameron-Weir’s writing has been published in collaboration with Camden Arts Centre, Kunsthall Bergen, Dortmunder Kunstverein, and White Flag Library as well as in publications such as Flash Art and The Happy Hypocrite.

== Public collections ==
- Art Gallery of Ontario, Toronto, ON, CA
- Fairfield University Art Museum, Fairfield, CT
- Hammer Museum, Los Angeles, CA
- Philadelphia Museum of Art, Philadelphia, PA
- Remai Modern, Saskatoon, SK, CA
- The Walker Art Center, Minneapolis, MN
- Benton Museum of Art at Pomona College, Claremont, CA
- Henry Art Gallery, Seattle, WA, USA
