= Bortolo d'Alvise =

Italian scientific instrument maker

Bortolo d'Alvise was a 16th-century Italian scientific instrument maker.

He was a Venetian glassmaker who, thanks to the negotiations by Grand Duke Cosimo I de' Medici (1519–1574) with the Venetian Republic, was called to Florence as a crystal-maker. He was documented in Florence as early as September 1569, and along with Jacomo and Alvise Della Luna was one of the finest Venetian glassmakers to settle in Florence. He remained there for about fourteen years, where he introduced new techniques. The inventory of his workshop records reticello (filigree) glass, engraved glass, ice glass, a gilded tray, and weave-pattern vases with handles.
