= Alana Bartol =

Canadian artist (born 1981)

Alana Bartol (born June 15, 1981, in Halifax, Nova Scotia) is a Canadian artist currently based in Calgary and teaching at the Alberta University of the Arts. Alana's multidisciplinary practice involves aspects of performance, installation, video and bioart through site-responsive and community embedded practices. Her work explores topics of place, species, bodies, and care, and draws upon the divination practice of dowsing.

Bartol has been exhibited at Plug In Institute of Contemporary Art (Winnipeg), ARC Gallery (Chicago), Contemporary Art Institute of Detroit, Karsh-Masson Gallery (Ottawa), SIMULTAN Festival (Romania), Museo de la Ciudad (Guadalajara, Mexico), Access Gallery (Vancouver), InterAccess (Toronto), Media City Film Festival (Windsor, ON), Groupe Intervention Vidéo (Montréal) and TRUCK Gallery (Calgary) among others.

Alana is the recipient of grants from the Canada Council for the Arts, The City of Windsor and the Ontario Arts Council.

== Exhibitions ==
In September 2017 Bartol initiated the Orphan Well Adoption Agency, a project facilitating the symbolic adoption of abandoned oil and gas wells. The project was hosted by Truck Contemporary Art Gallery in 2017 in the form of a pop-up office space where gallery visitors could ask questions and file a symbolic adoption.
