= Cyrus Augustus Bartol =

American pastor, author, and hymnist

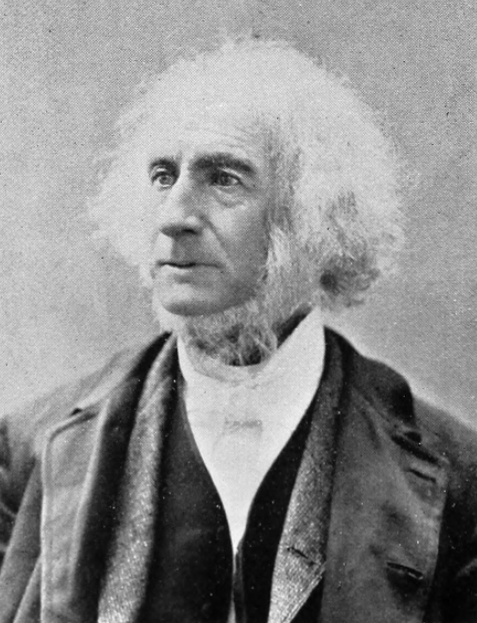
- Born: April 30, 1813; Freeport, Maine
- Died: December 16, 1900 (aged 87); Jamaica Plain, Massachusetts
- Resting place: Forest Hills Cemetery
- Education: Bowdoin College (1832); Harvard Divinity School (1835); Harvard College (1859)
- Occupations: Unitarian pastor, author, hymnist
- Years active: 1837–1889
- Spouse: Elizabeth Howard
- Children: Elizabeth H. Bartol

Cyrus Augustus Bartol (April 30, 1813 – December 16, 1900) was a Unitarian pastor, author, and hymnist.

== Biography ==
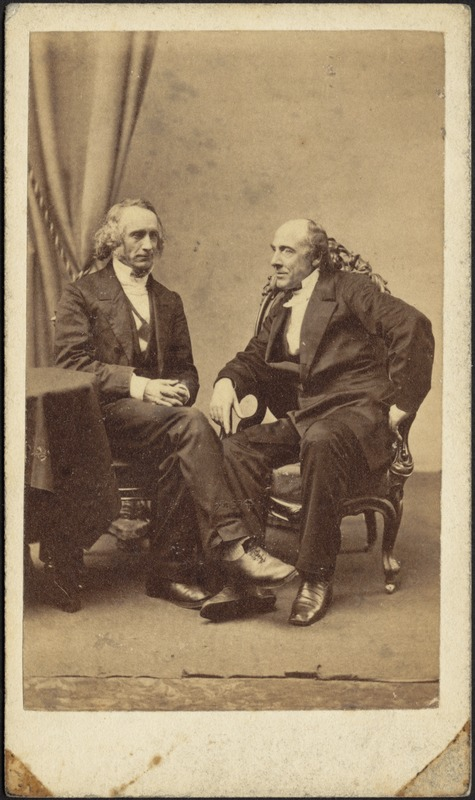
Cyrus Bartol and Henry Bellows

Bartol was born in Freeport, Maine on April 30, 1813. He was brought up in the Calvinist tradition by his parents, George Bartol and Anna Given. However, he was greatly influenced by a Unitarian minister named Ichabod Nichols who he described as "the spiritual guide of my youth." He graduated from Bowdoin College in 1832 and Harvard Divinity School in 1835. He was ordained in 1837, and received a Doctorate of divinity from Harvard College in 1859. He preached a short time in Cincinnati, Ohio before returning to Boston.

Bartol preached at West Church in Boston for over fifty years, half of which was spent as assistant and co-pastor to the Rev. Charles Lowell, father of the famous James Russell Lowell, and the other half as lead pastor of the church. Bartol married Elizabeth Howard, granddaughter of Simeon Howard, who had served as minister of West Church during the American Revolution, and had a daughter with her who they also named Elizabeth. In addition to a number of books and sermons, he was published in various periodicals including the Christian Examiner, the North American Review, and the Unitarian Review. He also published a number of hymns.

Bartol was interested in Transcendentalism and was influential in the movement in Boston. However, he was described as remaining "staunchly independent of sectarian creed and label" and although he was involved with Unitarian, Transcendentalist, and free religious movements, he was "never totally of [them.]" Other clergyman, authors, and philosophers such as Henry W. Bellows, Frederic H. Hedge, Ralph Waldo Emerson, Robert Collyer, Margaret Fuller, and George Ripley frequented his home. He was a close friend of the Alcott family, and spoke at Louisa May Alcott's funeral. He was also cited as the "most intimate ministerial friend" of Rev. Horace Bushnell. The New York Tribune called Bartol "probably the most successful minister in Boston" in 1868.

Bartol retired as pastor of the West Church on the 30th of September, 1889. He was to be its last pastor, as the building was sold in 1894 to be used as a branch of the public library. He then moved to Manchester-by-the-Sea, Massachusetts and became a successful real estate investor in the area.

Bartol died in Boston on December 16, 1900, at the age of 87. His funeral was well attended by friends and former members of his congregation, including Julia Ward Howe and Booker T. Washington. He was called by one writer "the last of the Transcendentalists."

The Hotel Bartol in Boston, MA (located on Huntington Ave and Gainsborough Ave) was built in 1886 by Albert Loring Murdock named this building after him.

== Publications (partial list) ==
=== Books ===
- Influence of the Ministry at Large in the City of Boston (James Munroe & Co.; 1836)
- Discourses on the Christian Spirit and Life (Boston: Crosby, Nichols, and co.; 1850)
- Discourses on the Christian Body and Form (Crosby: 1853)
- Grains of Gold, or Select Thoughts on Sacred Themes (American Unitarian Association; 1854)
- Hymns for the Sanctuary, also known as the "West Boston Collection" (Boston: Crosby, Nichols, and co.; 1849)
- Pictures of Europe, Framed in Ideas (Boston: Crosby, Nichols, and co.; 1855)
- West Church and Its Ministers (1856)
- Church and Congregation: A Plea for Their Unity (Ticknor and Fields; 1858)
- The Word of the Spirit to the Church (Walker, Wise; 1859)
- Radical Problems (Boston, Massachusetts: Roberts Brothers; 1872)
- The Rising Faith (Boston, Massachusetts: Roberts Brothers; 1874)
- Principles and Portraits (1880)

=== Sermons and addresses ===
- Christ the Way (Ballard & Messinger; 1847)
- A Discourse on the Life and Character of Samuel Putnam, LL.D., A.A.S., Late Judge of the Supreme Judicial Court of Massachusetts (Boston: Crosby, Nichols, and co.; 1853)
- The Relation of the Medical Profession to the Ministry: A Discourse Preached in the West Church (J. Wilson and son; 1854)
- Proceedings in the West Church on the Occasion of the Decease of Charles Lowell, D.D. (Walker, Wise, and Company; 1861)
- A sermon preached in Boston on the death of Abraham Lincoln (Boston, J. E. Tilton and company; 1865)
- True Childhood: A Sermon (J. Wilson and son; 1872)
- Amos Bronson Alcott, His Character: A Sermon (Roberts Brothers; 1888)

=== Forwards ===
- Recollections of Eminent Men: With Other Papers (Boston: Ticknor and Company; with Edwin Percy Whipple; 1886)
