= Thomas Kerr (illustrator) =

Canadian illustrator

Thomas Kerr (born August 30, 1962, in Calgary, Alberta) is a Canadian illustrator. Educated at the Alberta College of Art and Design and the School of Visual Arts. He is an editorial illustrator featured in the New York Times from 1989 to the present day. Kerr's work has been featured on the OpEd pages of many national publications, focusing on current affairs and political satire. He has received awards of excellence from The Society of Publication Design, Society for News Design, Communication Arts Magazine and is a member of the Society of Illustrators. Currently, he is an associate professor of illustration at St John's University in Queens, New York.

Kerr sued The New Yorker and illustrator Anita Kunz in 1999 for copyright infringement. Kerr argued that Kunz's illustration, "Manhattan Mohawk" was copied from his drawing, "New York Hairline". The New Yorker used Kunz's drawing for its 10 July 1995 cover. The court sided with Kunz, saying the drawings were not "substantially similar".
