= Art Gallery of Alberta =

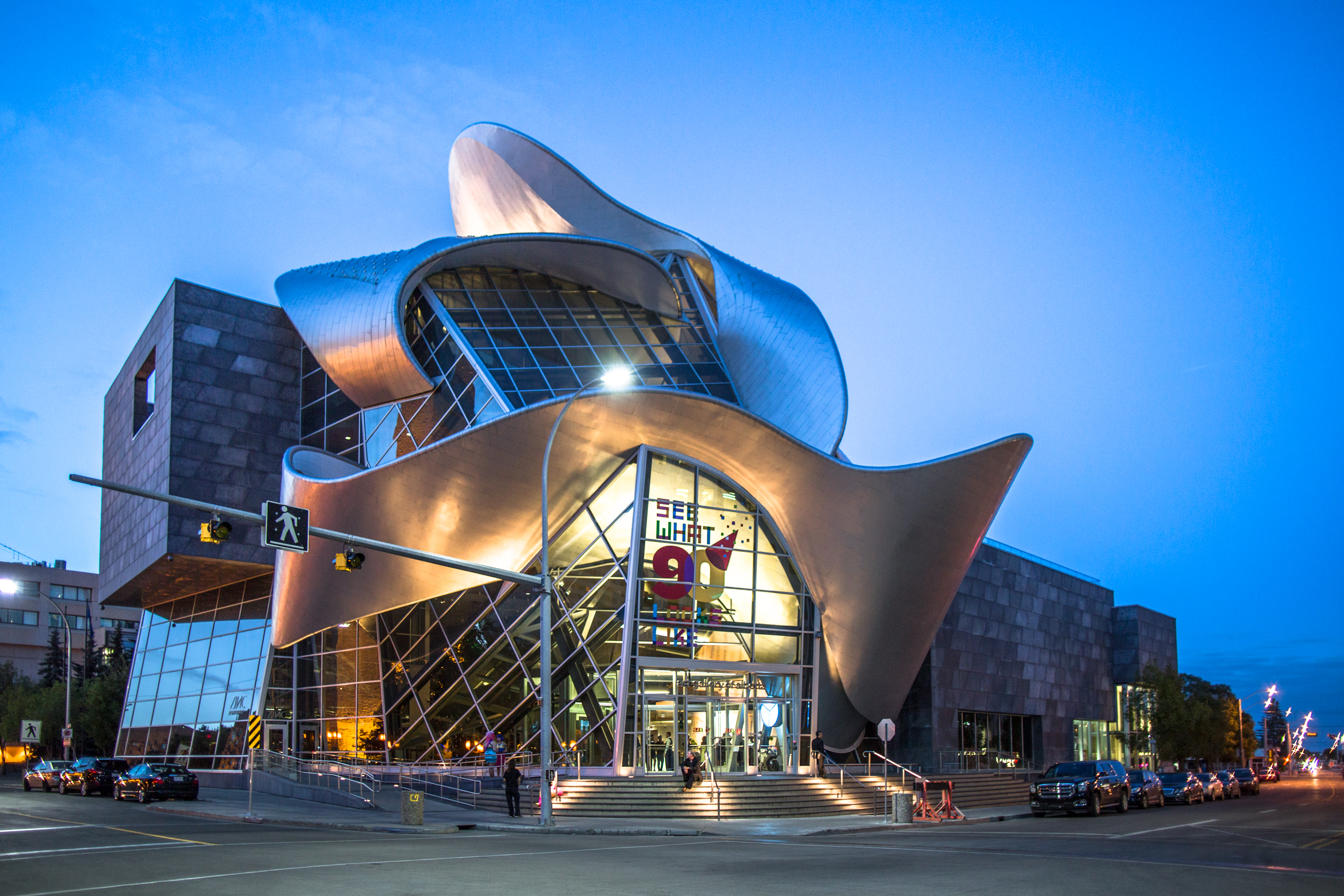
- Southwest exterior of the Art Gallery of Alberta

- Location in Edmonton
- Established: 1924; 102 years ago
- Location: 2 Sir Winston Churchill Square; Edmonton, Alberta; T5J 2C1
- Coordinates: 53.54491°N 113.48869°W
- Type: Art museum
- Visitors: 77,079 (2018)
- Director: Catherine Crowston
- Curators: Catherine Crowston (Chief Curator)
- Architect: Randall Stout (Note: The building designed by Stout incorporates portions of an older building designed by architects Donald G. Bittorf, and B. James Wensley.)
- Public transit access: Churchill station
- Website: youraga.ca

The Art Gallery of Alberta (AGA) is an art museum in Edmonton, Alberta, Canada. The museum occupies an 8,000 square metres (86,000 sq ft) building at Churchill Square in downtown Edmonton. The museum building was originally designed by Donald G. Bittorf, and B. James Wensley, although portions of that structure were demolished or built over during a redevelopment of the building by Randall Stout.

The art museum was established in 1924 as the Edmonton Museum of Arts. In 1956, the museum was renamed the Edmonton Art Gallery. The museum occupied a number of locations in the years after its establishment in 1924 until 1969. That year, the museum relocated to its present location and was reopened to the public in the Brutalist Arthur Blow Condell building. In 2005, the museum was renamed Art Gallery of Alberta. From 2007 to 2010, the building underwent an CA$88 million redevelopment, and was reopened to the public on January 31, 2010.

Its collection includes over 6,000 works, with a focus on art produced in Alberta, and other parts of western Canada. In addition to exhibiting its permanent collection, the museum also hosts travelling exhibitions and offers public education programs.

== History ==
The museum was established in 1924 as the Edmonton Museum of Arts, with a mandate to promote fine arts, and preserve historical relics from the region. The institution was established after Maud Bowman, the museums founding director and president enlisted the support of the Edmonton Art Club, and several other business, and political leaders.

The museum held its first exhibition in the Palm Room of the Hotel Macdonald, with work on loan from local collections that included members of the Edmonton Art Club in addition to 24 works on loan from the National Gallery of Canada collection. Growth of the museum's collection was slowed during the 1930s and 1940s, as a result of the Great Depression and the Second World War. During this period, the museum maintained a number of art education classes, and exhibited works on loan from the National Gallery of Canada.

In the first half of the 20th century, the museum occupied various sites, including a former Edmonton Public Library building, and the fourth floor of the Civic Block as well as the Edmonton Motors building before settling into the former home of Richard Secord in 1952. Recognizing that the majority of its collection and exhibition activities were in the area of fine arts, the institution opted to change its name to the Edmonton Art Gallery in 1956.

Efforts to construct a purpose-built facility for the art museum began in 1962, after A. E. Condell bequeathed funds to the museum on behalf of her son, Arthur Blow Condell. Designs by architects Donald G. Bittorf and B. James Wensley were chosen for the building, with the City of Edmonton donating 2,400 square metres (0.59 acres) at Churchill Square for the site of the new building. The building was opened in 1969, and was named the Arthur Blow Condell Memorial Building. Further renovations to the building in 1977 saw the creation of a new wing, replacing an exterior courtyard.

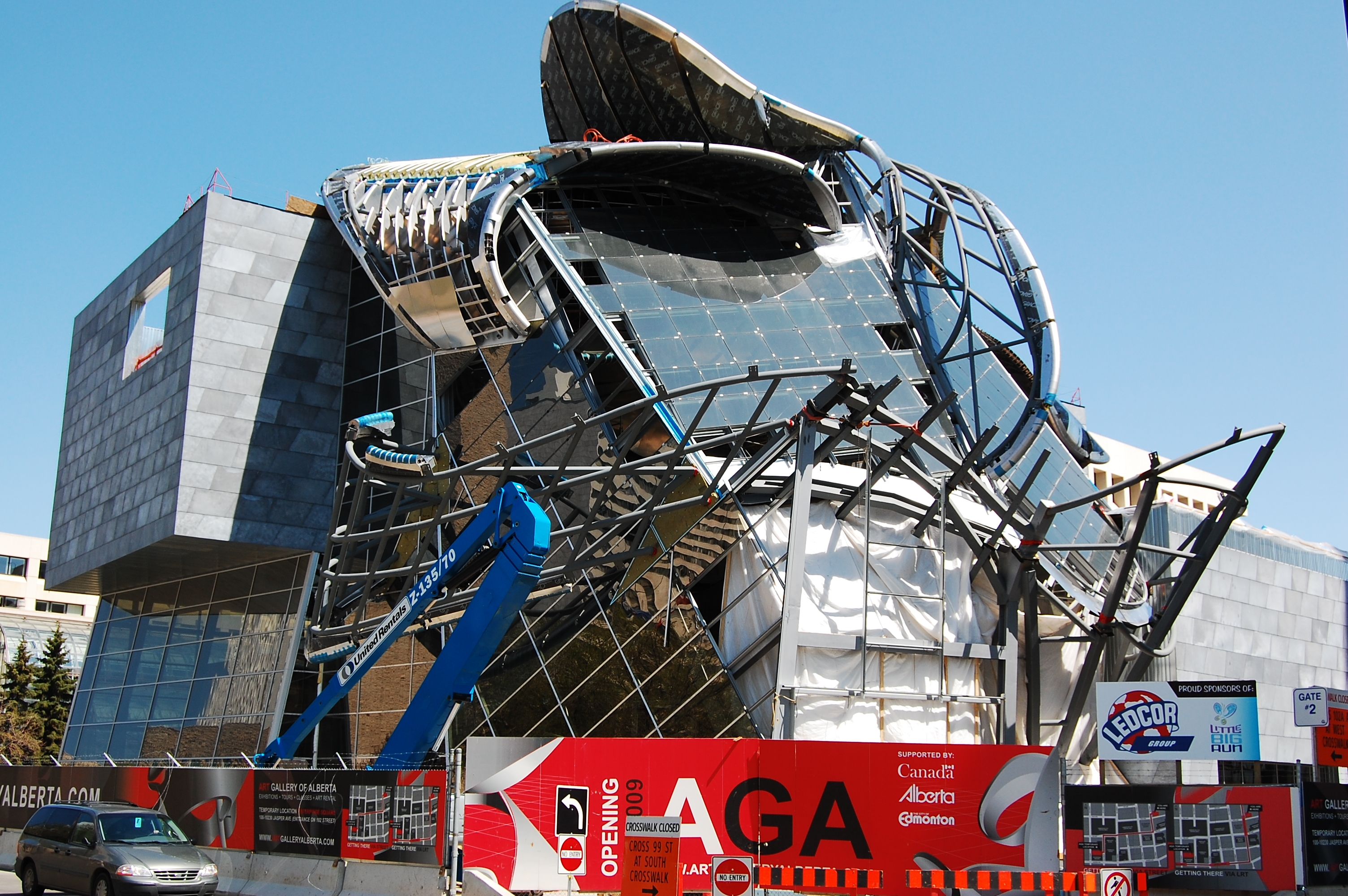
Construction for the museum's new building in May 2009

Proposals to renovate the building were made in June 1998, although serious discussions about its funding did not begin until 2001. In 2005, the museum launched an architectural competition, with 27 architects submitting applications. In September 2005, the design from Los Angeles–based architect Randall Stout was chosen as the winning design for the museum. The redevelopment doubled the exhibition space within its structure, and provided an off-site storage site for its collection. On the same day the winning design was announced, the museum was renamed the Art Gallery of Alberta, in an effort to reflect its expanding focus on art from all of Alberta.

In April 2007, the Arthur Blow Condell building was partially demolished with significant portions of the existing structure incorporated into Stout's design. Construction of the new building formally began in June 2007. The museum was closed to the public from March 2007 to January 2010 in order to facilitate the construction of the new building, with a museum exhibiting its collection in a former Hudson's Bay Company property at Enterprise Square from April 2007 to December 2009. The museum's inaugural exhibitions after the renovation included: Edgar Degas: Figures in Motion; Karsh: Image Maker; and The Murder of Crows, the North American premiere of Janet Cardiff and George Bures Miller's sound installation. After the museum reopened on 31 January 2010, annual memberships to the Art Gallery of Alberta increased, with the museum seeing 30,000 visitors within the first six weeks of reopening.

In December 2009, the museum and the National Gallery of Canada issued a joint press release announcing a three-year partnership, which saw the use of the Art Gallery of Alberta's galleries to exhibit works from the National Gallery's collection. The program was the first "satellite program" between the National Gallery of Canada, and another art museum.

In 2017, the museum started an initiative of providing free admission for minors and post-secondary students.

== Grounds ==
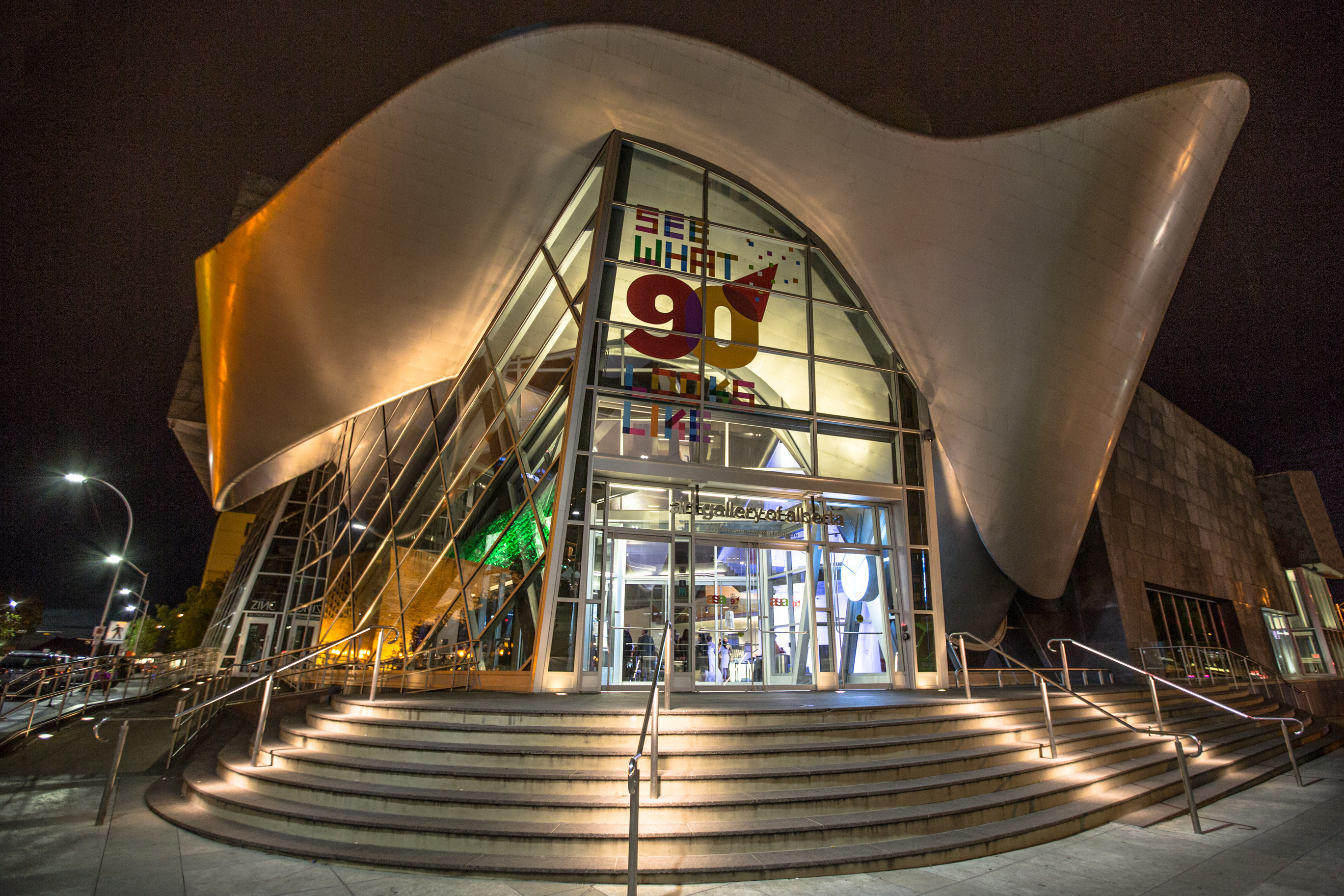
Southwest entrance to the museum. The steel ribbon built atop the entrance is intended to represent the auroras, and the North Saskatchewan River

The property is located at Churchill Square, a public square in downtown Edmonton. The building takes up 8,000 square metres (86,000 sq ft) of the property, which includes over 3,000 square metres (32,000 sq ft) of climate-controlled exhibition spaces.

=== Building ===
The building was designed by Randall Stouts Architects, Inc., from Los Angeles and San Francisco. Local architects and engineering firms HIP Architects, Stantec, BPTEC Engineering, and Read Jones Christoffersen assisted Randall Stout's design team; while Ledcor Group of Companies provided construction management for the project. The original budget for the renovation was CA$48 million, although it was later increased to C$88 million.

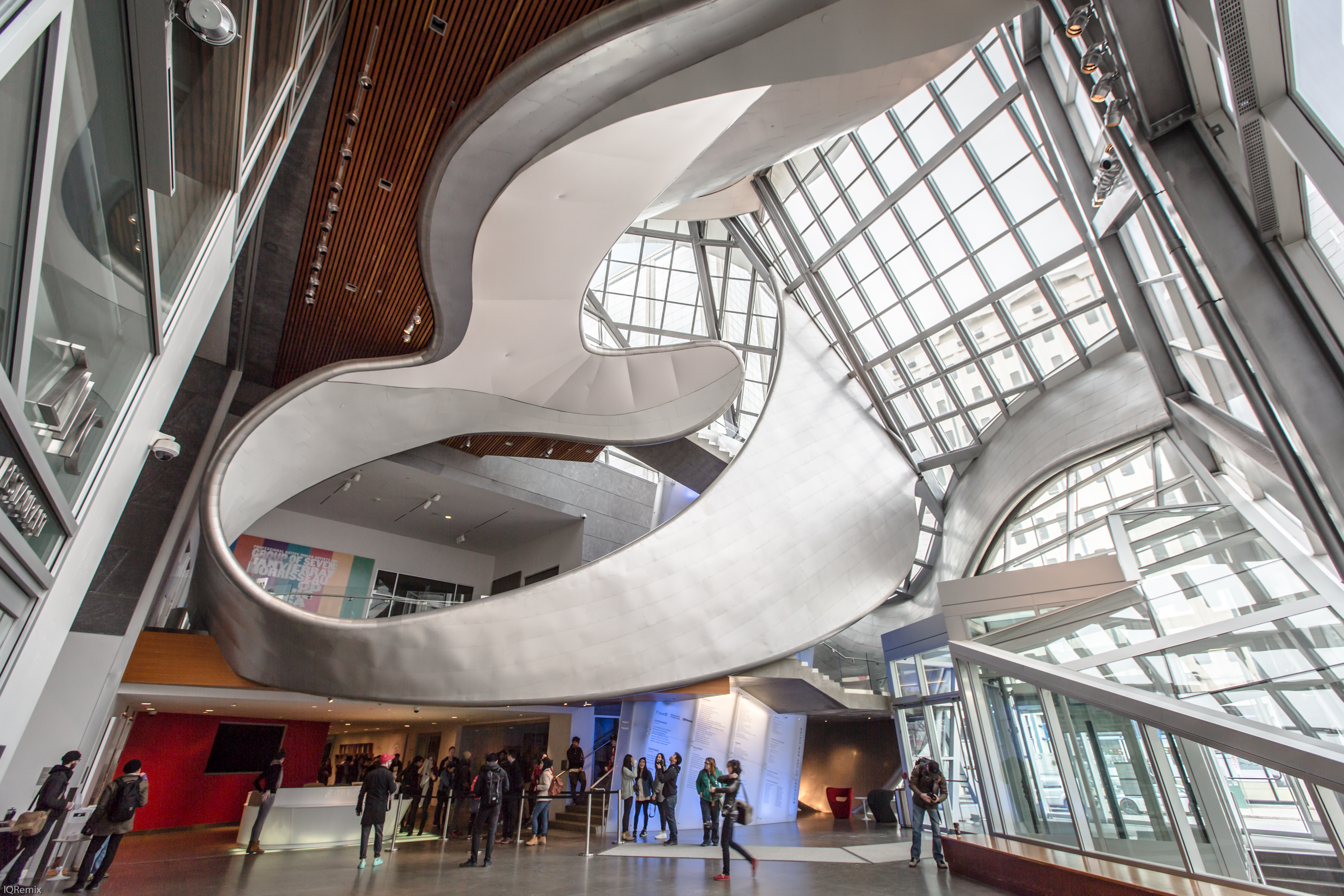
A stainless steel ribbon in the museum's lobby

The patinated zinc and stainless steel design was intended to demonstrate the museum's "commitment to contemporary art". The exterior of the building features a 190 metres (620 ft) steel ribbon, intended to represent the North Saskatchewan River, and the aurora, geographical phenomenons and features of Edmonton. The building's interior also features an "aurora" inspired room. The building includes a restaurant, espresso bar, gift shop, and an educational facility with a 150-seat theatre known as the Singhmar Centre for Art Education. The building includes a rooftop patio known as the City of Edmonton Terrace. The building also includes rental spaces for the public, such as Manning Hall.

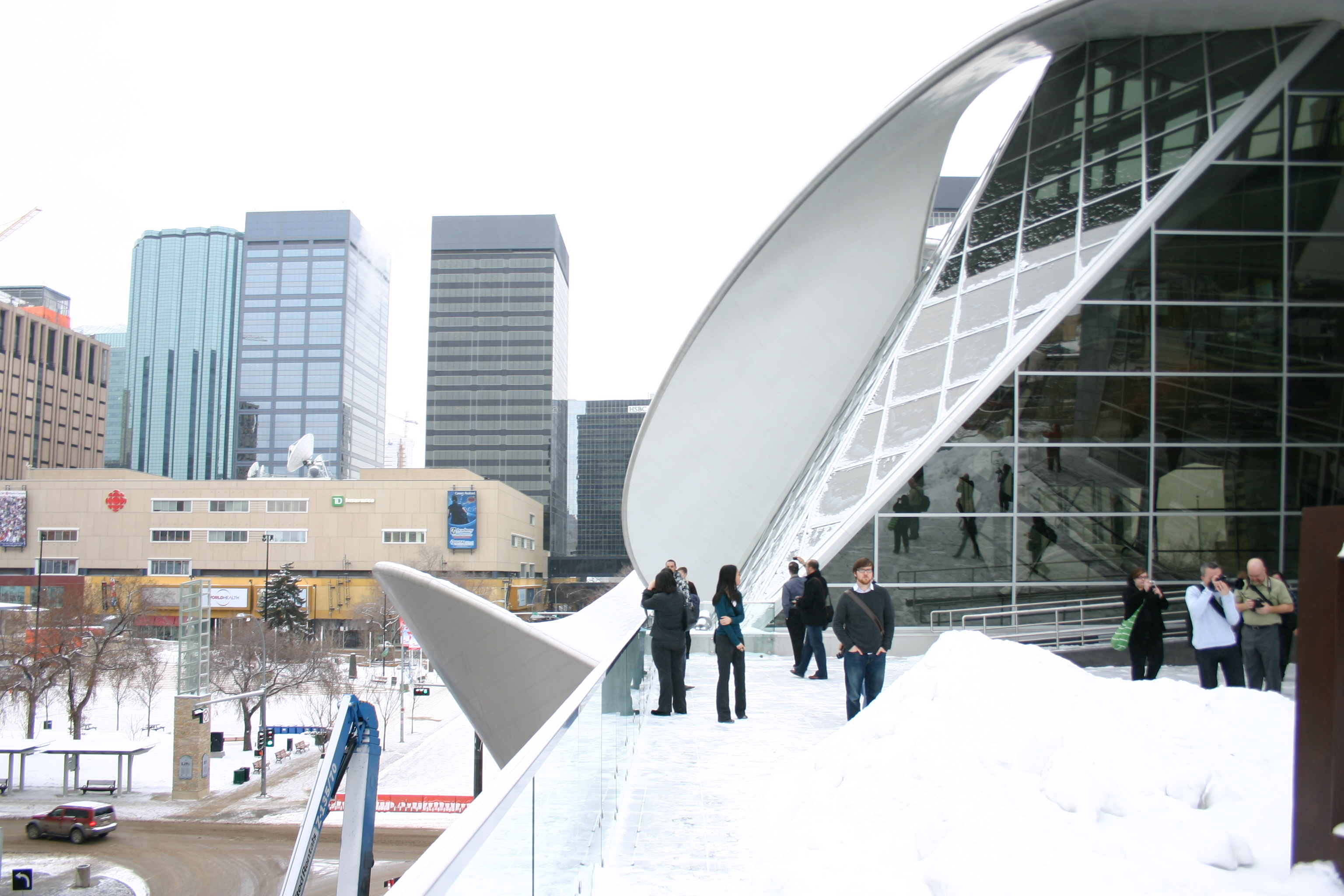
View from the museum building's rooftop patio

The original structure on the property that was used by the museum, the Arthur Blow Condell building, was opened in 1969 with designs from Donald G. Bittorf, and B. James Wensley. The Brutalist-styled building was partially demolished in 2007 to accommodate the reconstruction of the building. However, approximately 67 per cent of the older museum structure was retained during the reconstruction, with most of the retained portions used as the new building's foundation, or lower floors. The new building's third-floor terrace was the roof of the Arthur Blow Condell building.

The museum building was designed to be accessible with automatic doors and provides wheelchairs upon request, and free admission for accompanying care workers. The museum also operates an "equity committee" that serves to identify barriers rooted in ableism, racism, or exclusion; and advises the museum's board of directors and facility management on practice and changes.

=== Transit access ===
The museum is accessible through public transit from Churchill station, a station for the Edmonton LRT system. The museum provides a discount to visitors who travelled by public transit. Parking spaces for automobiles and bicycles is not provided by the museum, with museum visitors reliant on surrounding parking spaces maintained by the municipal government.

== Permanent collection ==
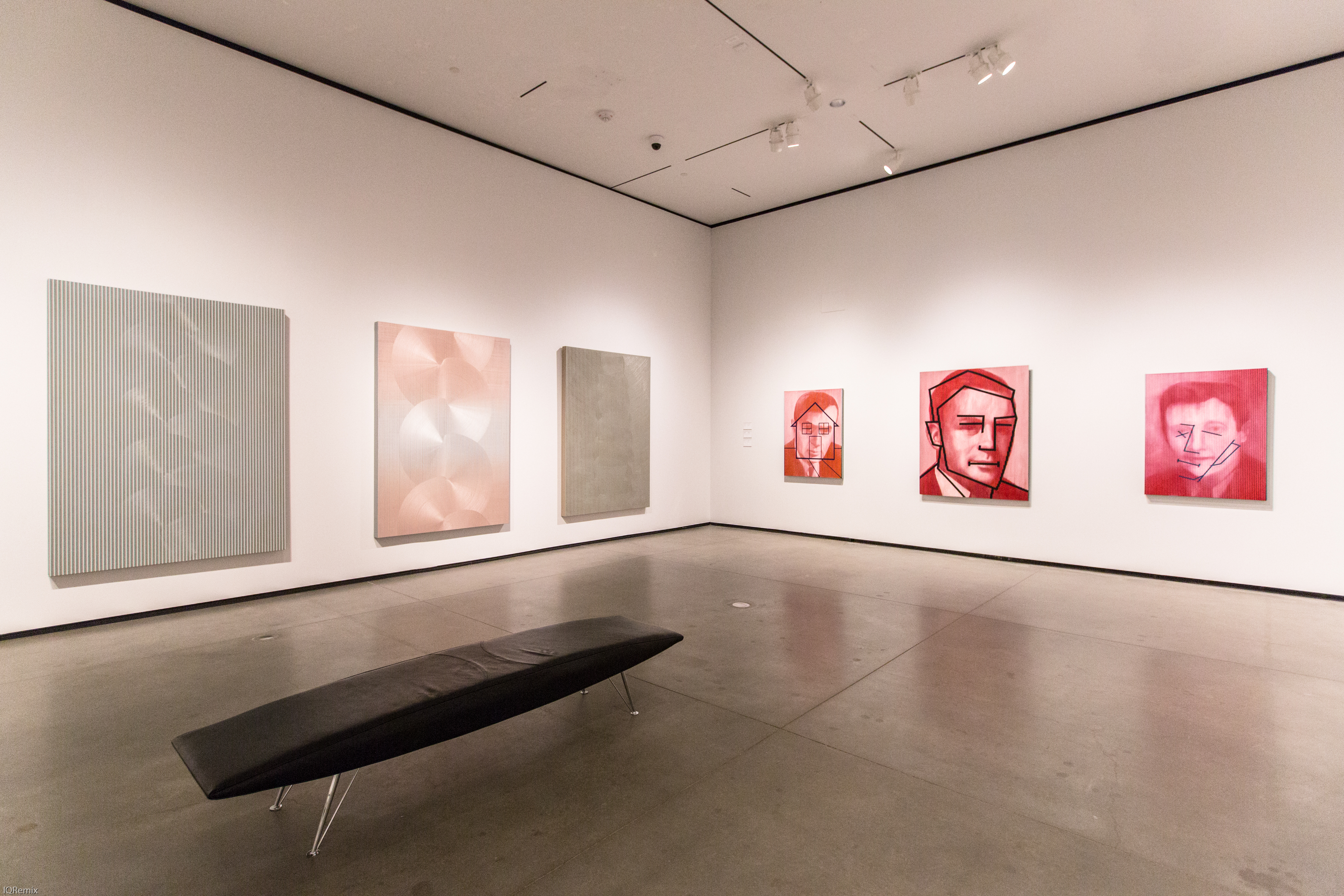
Works from the permanent collection on display at the museum

The museum's permanent collection features over 6,000 works, the majority of which were produced after the 1950s. Many of these works were acquired by the museum through private and public donors. The museum's collection has an emphasis on art that was produced in Alberta, or western Canada. The museum's permanent collection began in 1924, although its growth was slowed during the 1930s and 1940s as a result of the Great Depression and the Second World War. From the 1960s to the 1985, the museum's focused its acquisition efforts on paintings and sculptures of modern art. In 2015, the museum's permanent collection was valued at approximately CA$30 million. In 2017, the museum received $375,000 to acquire works by contemporary First Nations, Inuit and Metis artists for their permanent collection from the Canada Council for the Arts' New Chapter program.

The museum's collection of historical Canadian art includes works by Jack Bush, Emily Carr, Henry George Glyde, Illingworth Kerr, Cornelius Krieghoff, Pegi Nicol MacLeod, James Wilson Morrice, Marion Nicoll, Paul Peel, Bill Reid, Jean-Paul Riopelle, Carl Schaefer, Lilias Torrance Newton, and members of the Group of Seven.

The museum's collection of modern and contemporary art feature works by Canadian artists including Robert Boyer, Janet Cardiff, Chris Cran, Marlene Creates, Dean Drever, Aganetha Dyck, Douglas Haynes, Alex Janvier, Brian Jungen, Rita Letendre, Amy Malbeuf, Liz Magor, Lyndal Osborne, Jane Ash Poitras, and Takao Tanabe.

The museum's collection of photographs was started in 1977 and presently has over 1,500 photographs. The museum's collection of photographs includes historical photographs by Edward Curtis, Karl Blossfeldt, Walker Evans, and Yousuf Karsh, and contemporary photographs by Lynne Cohen, and William Eakin. The museum also maintains a prints collection that includes over 850 works by Thomas Bewick.

=== Selected works ===
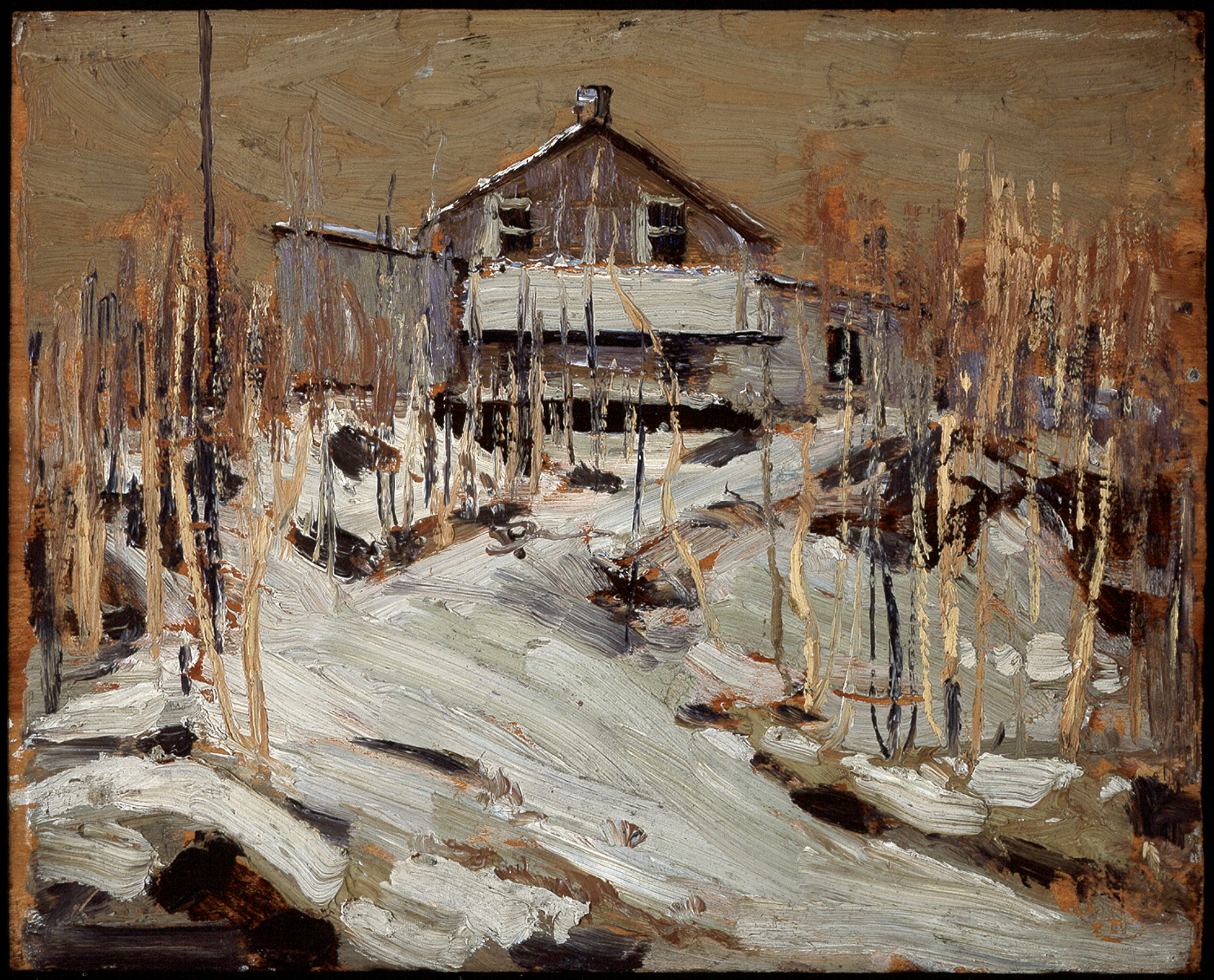
Frasers Lodge, Tom Thomson, 1915

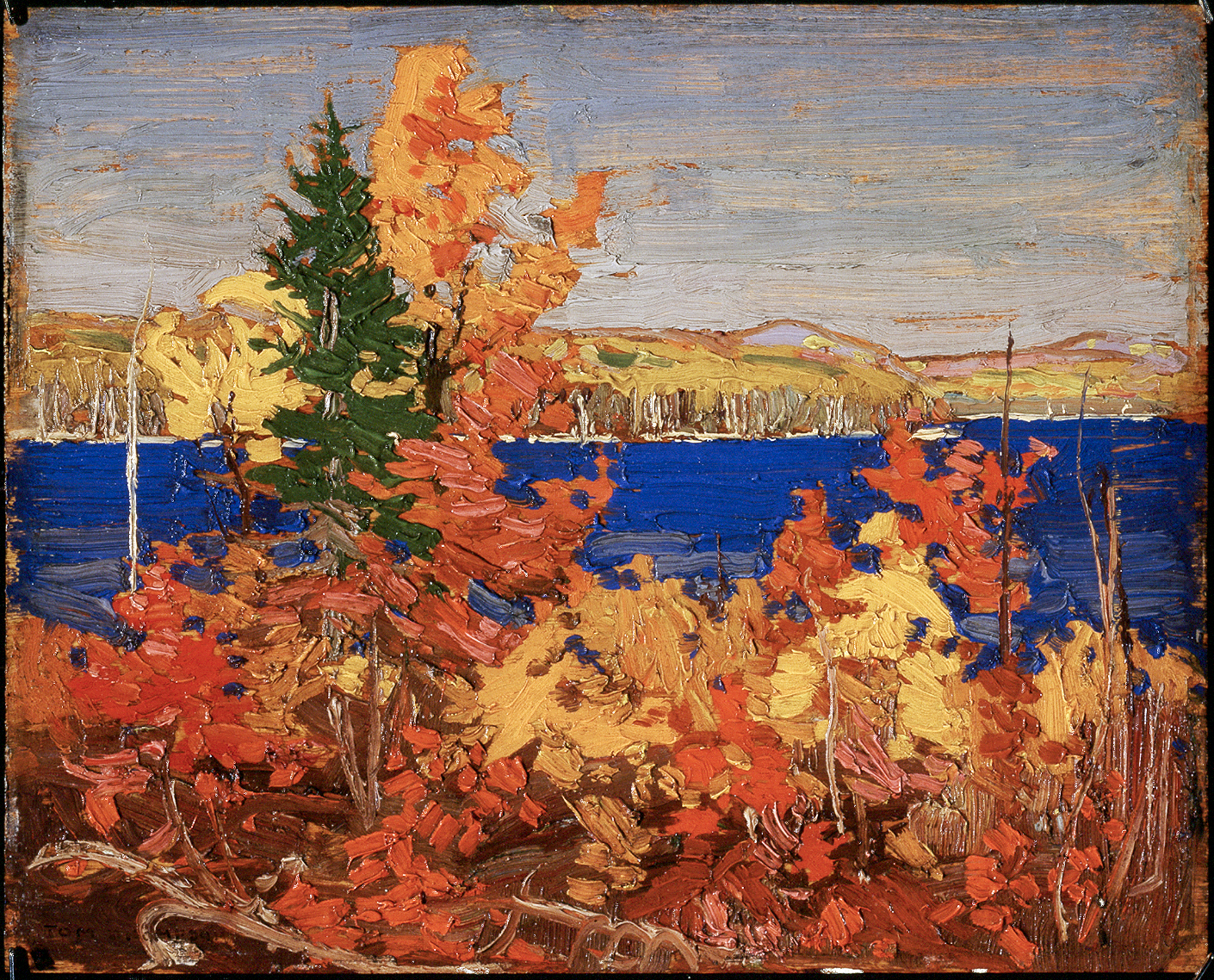
Autumn Filiage, Tom Thomson, 1916

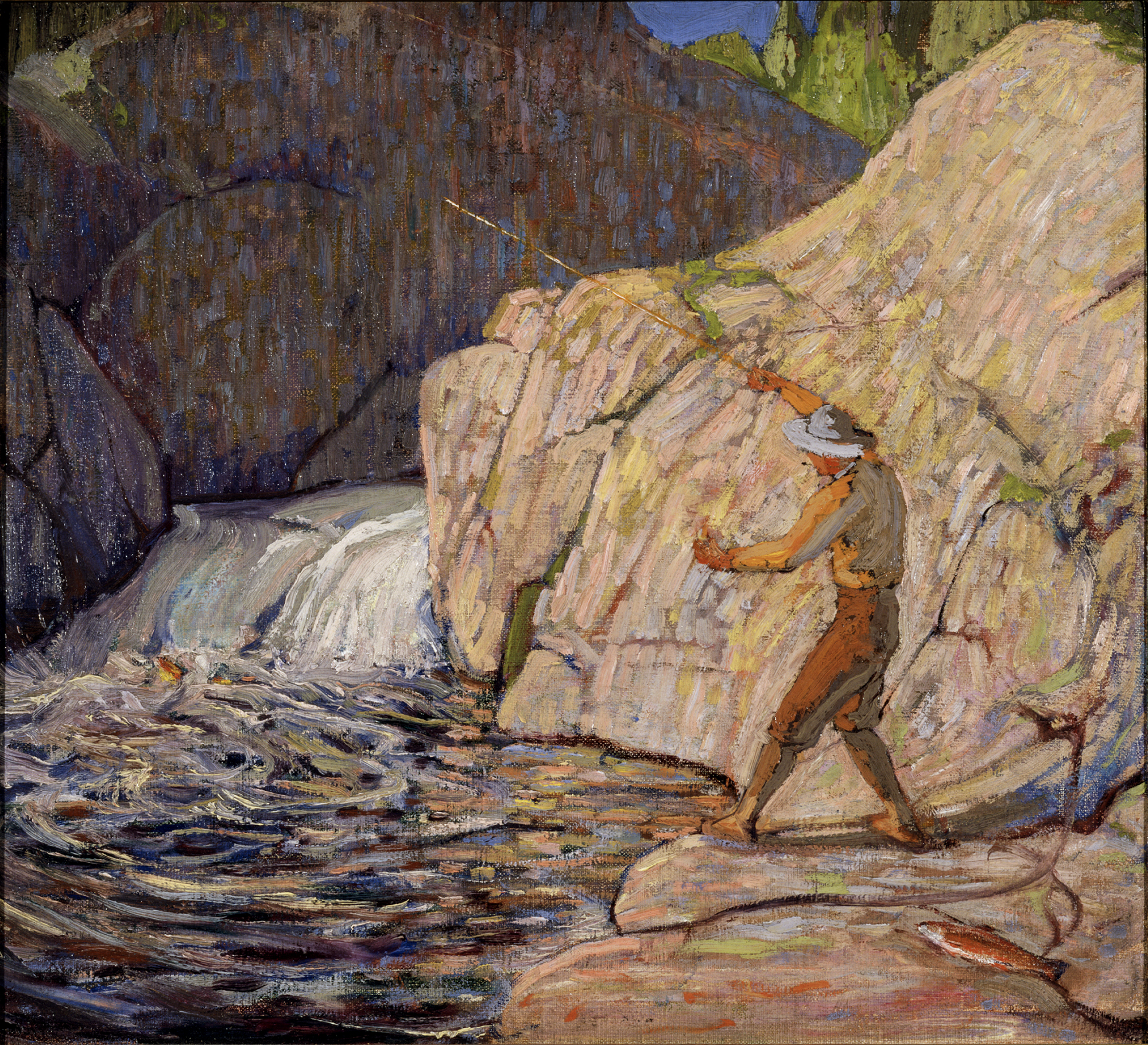
The Fisherman, Tom Thomson, c. 1916–1917

== Affiliations ==
The museum is affiliated with the Alberta Museum Association, the Canadian Heritage Information Network, the Canadian Museums Association, and the Virtual Museum of Canada.

== See also ==
- List of art museums
- List of museums in Alberta
