= Marion Nicoll =

Canadian painter

Marion Florence Nicol
- Born: Marion Florence MacKay; April 11, 1909; Calgary, Alberta
- Died: March 6, 1985 (aged 75); Calgary, Alberta
- Known for: Painter
- Movement: Abstract Art
- Spouse: Jim Nicoll (m. 1940)

Marion Florence Nicoll (née MacKay; 11 April 1909 – 6 March 1985) was a Canadian painter. She is known as one of the first abstract painters in Alberta. In 1933 she became the first woman instructor at the Provincial Institute of Technology and Art. In 1977 Nicoll became the first woman artist in the Prairies to become a member of the Royal Canadian Academy of Arts.

== Biography ==
Nicoll was born in Calgary, Alberta. She was the daughter of emigrants Robert Mackay, of Scottish descent, and Florence Gingras, of Irish and French heritage. When she was in high school, Nicoll began painting at St. Joseph's Convent in Red Deer, Alberta, taking classes between 1925 and 1926. She then studied formally at the Ontario College of Art in Toronto (1927–1929), where she was taught by portraitist John Martin Alfsen and Group of Seven landscape artists Arthur Lismer, Frank Johnston, and J.E.H. MacDonald. Marion undertook further training at the Provincial Institute of Technology and Art in Calgary (1929–1932), Central School of Arts and Crafts in London (1937–1938), Emma Lake Seminar in Regina (1957), and the Art Students League of New York in New York City (1957–1959). Nicoll went on to teach at the Provincial Institute of Technology and Art, the University of Alberta, and the Banff School of Fine Arts.

Nicoll started her painting career depicting Alberta landscapes. In the summer of 1946, while working at the Banff School of Fine Arts, Nicoll met Jock Macdonald, a fellow faculty member. He introduced her to automatism, a practice associated with the European Surrealists, and it marked a pivotal moment in her practice. Becoming the sole artist in Alberta along with Macdonald to work in automatism, Nicoll frequently produced paintings and drawings without premeditation for the next six years, accumulating four-foot-high stacks of sketchbooks. Her work then evolved into abstraction in the 1950s, in particular after her visit to the Emma Lake Artist's Workshop conducted by Will Barnet in 1957. According to Christopher Jackson, from that point on, Nicoll completely abandoned naturalism.

Nicoll worked in a diverse range of media, including print-making, ceramics, batiks, jewelry making, and, above all, painting.

Nicoll lived in the Bowness neighbourhood in Calgary with her husband Jim Nicoll, an engineer and amateur artist originally from Fort Macleod, whom she met in 1933 and married in 1940. Many of her paintings are held by the Glenbow Museum in Calgary. A Gallery at the Alberta College of Art and Design is named after her.

Nicoll had to abandon painting in 1971 due to arthritis, but continued to make art by using a more physically manageable, though unconventional technique she called clayprinting.
