= Alberta University of the Arts =

Public university in Calgary, Alberta, Canada

- Former name: SAIT Art Department (1926–1960); Alberta College of Art (1960–1995); Alberta College of Art and Design (1995–2018)
- Type: Public
- Established: 1926; 100 years ago (Note: The institution traces its origins to the Southern Alberta Institute of Technology's (SAIT) art department from 1926. The academic department became independent from SAIT in 1985.)
- Affiliations: AICAD, ACCC, CCAA, Alberta Colleges Athletics Conference, Alberta Association of Colleges & Technical Institutes, CBIE, NASAD
- President: Janis Goldie
- Faculty: 145
- Administrative staff: 95
- Students: 1,015 (2023-24 full-time equivalent)
- Location: 1407 14 Avenue NW; Calgary, Alberta; T2N 4R3; 51°03′43″N 114°05′29″W
- Campus: Urban
- Colours: Red White
- Website: auarts.ca
- ASN: 54307
- Location within Calgary

The Alberta University of the Arts (AUArts) is a public art university located in Calgary, Alberta, Canada. The university is a co-educational institution that operates four academic schools.

The institution originated from the art department established by the Southern Alberta Institute of Technology (SAIT) in 1926, later renamed the Alberta College of Art in 1960. It was separated from SAIT in 1985, becoming an independent, publicly funded college. In 1995, the university was granted the authority to issue Bachelor of Fine Arts degrees and was renamed the Alberta College of Art and Design (ACAD). The institution was designated a university by the government of Alberta in 2018 and was renamed the Alberta University of the Arts in the following year, to reflect its change in status.

== History ==
The university's origins date back to the founding of the Provincial Institute of Technology and Art (PITA) in 1916. Beginning with evening and Saturday classes, day classes were offered starting in 1926, with Lars Haukaness appointed as the first head of the art department. In 1960, PITA was renamed the Southern Alberta Institute of Technology (SAIT), and the art department became the Alberta College of Art (ACA).

In 1973, after eight years of planning and construction, the Alberta College of Art moved into a brand new purpose-built building designed by architectural firm Cohos, Delesalle and Evamy, on the edge of Calgary's North Hill, next to the Southern Alberta Jubilee Auditorium.

The Alberta College of Art became a separate institution from SAIT in 1985, and in 1995 amended its name to become the Alberta College of Art and Design.

On February 1, 2019, ACAD officially became the Alberta University of the Arts.

== Campus ==
=== Library and galleries ===
AUArts' Luke Lindoe Library is named after alumnus, instructor, and founder of the Ceramics Department, Luke Lindoe, and maintains a collection of over 25,000 art and design-related titles. The university is also home to two professional galleries, the Illingworth Kerr Gallery and the Marion Nicoll Gallery (MNG), and nine student-run gallery and pop-up spaces.

The Alberta University of the Arts gallery was renamed after artist and instructor Illingworth Kerr when AUArts moved into its current location in 1973, expanding into a 9,500-square-foot facility.

The MNG, named after artist and teacher Marion Nicoll, is based on a not-for-profit model and run by the AUArts Students' Association. MNG manages three locations (in AUArts' Main Mall, the AUArts/Jubilee LRT station hallway, and in downtown Calgary's Arts Commons +15 walkway), and focuses on exhibiting student work. AUArtSA also manages nine student exhibition spaces on campus.

=== Lodgepole Center ===
Given its name by AUArts' Elder Council to reflect the supportive nature of the lodgepole, traditionally placed at the centre of the tipi to carry the weight of the covering, AUArts' Indigenous resource centre, the Lodgepole Center, officially opened on campus in September 2016. An all-inclusive space, the Lodgepole Center facilitates elder advising and support, traditional ceremonies, and workshops, and is a quiet study, smudge, and gathering space.

== Academics ==
As a college, the institution had the authority to grant certificates and diplomas. In 1995 the Alberta Government authorized granting the degree of Bachelor of Fine Arts and in 2000 gave authority to grant the Bachelor of Design degree. The Master of Fine Arts in Craft Media was launched in 2015 with the inaugural class receiving their degrees in May 2017.

In March 2018, ACAD was named a university by the Minister of Advanced Education. It is the only institution in the province to offer and confer university-level undergraduate and now, graduate degree programs in art, craft, and design. On January 17, 2019, the Government of Alberta announced that ACAD was to become the Alberta University of the Arts (abbreviated as AUArts). The transition began on the same day while the name and university status became effective formally on February 1, 2019.

AUArts' degree programs are housed within four administrative schools:

- The School of Craft + Emerging Media (ceramics, fibre, glass, jewellery + metals, and media arts)
- The School of Visual Arts (drawing, painting, print media, photography, and sculpture)
- The School of Communication Design
- The School of Critical + Creative Studies (non-studio academic courses)

== Notable people ==
=== Alumni ===
- Amalie Atkins
- Brittney Bear Hat
- Richelle Bear Hat
- John Brocke
- Elaine Cameron-Weir
- Sharon Christian
- Cam Christiansen
- Dean Drever
- Faye HeavyShield
- Alex Janvier
- Thomas Kerr
- Amy Malbeuf
- Joni Mitchell
- Katie Ohe
- Sandra Sawatzky
- Fiona Staples

=== Faculty and instructors ===
- Orland Larson
- Alana Bartol
- Mireille Perron
- Rita McKeough
- John Brocke
- Norman Yates

== See also ==
- Education in Alberta
- List of universities in Canada
