= Illingworth Kerr =

Canadian painter, illustrator and writer

Illingworth Holey Kerr
- Photograph of Kerr by Dr. Paul Chapnick
- Born: 20 August 1905; Lumsden, Saskatchewan, Canada
- Died: 6 January 1989 (aged 83); Calgary, Alberta, Canada
- Occupations: Painter, teacher

Illingworth "Buck" Kerr CM RCA L.L. D. (20 August 1905 – 6 January 1989) was a Canadian painter, illustrator and writer. He is best known for his landscape paintings of the Saskatchewan and Alberta prairies and foothills.

== Early years ==
Illingworth Holey Kerr was born on 20 August 1905 in Lumsden, Saskatchewan, 31 kilometres (19 mi) northwest of the city of Regina. His parents were William Hugh and Florence (Nurse) Kerr. He was one of four children. His mother, who painted in watercolour, encouraged him to draw and paint when he was young. He often depicted animals. In 1919 he entered fourteen of his works in the Regina Exhibition, all of which won awards. His artistic talent was evident, and in 1923 relatives in eastern Canada paid for him to study in Toronto.

Kerr studied at the Central Technical School in 1924, and at the Ontario College of Art (OCA) from 1924 to 1927. His teachers at the OCA were Arthur Lismer, J. E. H. MacDonald, Frederick Varley, and John William Beatty. In 1927 he spent time in the Georgian Bay region of Ontario. Kerr then returned to Lumsden where he found work on harvest and railway crews. He painted signs and trapped, and was a writer and illustrator. He painted when he had time in a tiny studio above the town's pool hall. In 1936 Kerr travelled to England and studied at the Westminster School of Art in London. While there he met Mary Spice of Yorkton, Saskatchewan. They married in 1938, spent their honeymoon in Paris and the south of France, then returned to Montreal in 1938 on a Cunard ship.

== Professional career ==
The Kerrs lived in Montreal for a period, where Illingworth Kerr collaborated on illustrations of Canada for the 1939 New York World's Fair. The Kerrs were back in Saskatchewan in the winter of 1939–40. There he undertook commissions for the Lumsden restaurant owner Charlie Wong, and exhibited his work at the Regina Art College. The Kerrs moved to British Columbia and lived in turn in White Rock, Cultus Lake, and Vancouver. Kerr taught at the Vancouver School of Art from 1945 to 1947. He often exhibited his paintings at this time. He became a member of the British Columbia Society of Artists and the Federation of Canadian Artists, then headed by Lawren Harris.

Kerr was appointed director of the art department of the Provincial Institute of Technology and Arts (now Alberta University of the Arts) in Calgary in 1947. Soon after arriving Kerr was made a director of the Calgary Zoological Society and an associate director of the Calgary Stampede. Kerr was given commissions to paint portraits of prominent Albertans such as Grant MacEwan, Harry Strom and John C. Bowen. Kerr was president of the Alberta Society of Artists from 1952 to 1953. He also wrote short stories, illustrated many publications, and was a member of the Canadian Authors Association. In 1954 he studied with Hans Hofmann in Provincetown, Massachusetts. He attended Emma Lake Artists' Workshops in 1955 and 1957. Kerr received a Canada Council Award in 1960 and travelled in England and France in 1960–61.

Kerr retired from teaching in 1967 and entered a period of great artistic productivity, painting landscapes and also making drawings and prints of animals. He received an honorary doctorate from the University of Calgary in 1973. The Kerrs began to spend their winters in the warmth of St. Lucia, Arizona, Maui, Barbados, Jamaica, and Mazatlan. Mary Spice Kerr died in 1982. In 1983 Illingworth Kerr was named to the Order of Canada. He died in Calgary tragically by suicide having gone blind on 6 January 1989 at the age of 83. The Alberta University of the Arts Gallery was renamed the Illingworth Kerr Gallery in September 1990.

== Work ==
Kerr made pictures of First Nations people, portraits, towns, wild animals, and the landscapes of the prairies and Ontario. He drew in charcoal and ink, and painted in oil, acrylic and watercolour. Kerr also made prints with woodblock, linoblock, monotype, and silkscreen. Kerr's work has a two-dimensional quality. His early landscapes show the influence of Lawren Harris, with his emphasis on design and use of long, curving brush strokes. These paintings, in the tradition of the Group of Seven, depict angular fields, rolling skies and simple prairie towns. His later work had a more broken style of brush strokes. He experimented with abstracts based on the spaces of the prairie.

Kerr held retrospective exhibitions in 1940, 1962, 1975, and 1985. The 1985 retrospective named "Harvest of the Spirit" toured nine major public galleries. His work is held by the Art Gallery of Alberta, the Glenbow Museum in Calgary, the University of Lethbridge collection and the Mendel Art Gallery in Saskatoon. The National Gallery of Canada in Ottawa also holds his work, as do many corporate and private collections. Some of his drawings and prints are exhibited by the Lumsden Museum in his home town. Stan Perrot, a former colleague at the Alberta College of Art, wrote that Kerr was "a tower of strength in Alberta... The painters of Alberta today may not paint like Buck Kerr—but they are his children. They all caught his spirit. He was the central reference point for artistic morality and dynamic living."

== Publications ==
In the early 1930s Kerr's short stories were published in Blackwood's Magazine of Edinburgh. Later publications include:

- Kerr, Illingworth H. (1946). Gay Dogs and Dark Horses. Dent. (Illustrated stories of prairie life)
- Kerr, Illingworth H. (1973). Illingworth Kerr : Fifty Years a Painter. Alberta College of Art.
- Callahan, Margaret; Edmonton Art Gallery; Kerr, Illingworth H. (1985). Moisson de l'esprit : rétrospective d'Illingworth Kerr. Edmonton Art Gallery. ISBN 978-0-88950-043-3.
- Kerr, Illingworth (1987). Paint and Circumstance. Jules and Maureen Poscente, Ralph Hedlin, Heidi Redekop and Wm. H. Hopper. ISBN 978-0-9693218-1-1. (autobiography)
- Kerr, Illingworth H.; University of Lethbridge. Art Gallery (1992). The Drawings of Illingworth Kerr. Printing Services University of Lethbridge. ISBN 978-0-919555-82-2.

== Sources ==
- Cline, Heather (2014). "KERR, ILLINGWORTH (1905–89)". Encyclopedia of Saskatchewan. University of Regina.
- "Illingworth Kerr wanted for purchase or consignment". Mayberry Fine Art.
- "Illingworth Kerr". Saskatchewan NAC.
- "Illingworth Kerr RCA". willock&sax gallery.
- Laverty, Kathleen (22 May 2008). "Illingworth Holey Kerr". Canadian Encyclopedia. Historica Canada.
