= Black Wimmin: When and Where We Enter =

1989 exhibition

Black Wimmin: When and Where We Enter, organized by the Diasporic African Women’s Art Collective (DAWA), was the first Canadian exhibit exclusively featuring Black women artists. This traveling exhibition showcased groundbreaking art across Canada in 1989.

== Description of the Exhibition ==
The title, Black Wimmin: When and Where We Enter, references the words of Anna Julia Cooper, a Black activist in the late 19th and early 20th century. The exhibition featured the work of 11 artists living and working in Toronto, Ottawa, Kingston, Montreal and Edmonton. Seminars and talks were also organized to accompany the exhibition.

The exhibition was conceptualized by Buseje Bailey and Grace Channer, both Black women artists, activists, and members of the DAWA collective. The curatorial approach was collaborative and based in African-centred, diasporic and feminist frameworks. The exhibition aimed to publicly express the cultural concerns of Black women and provided a space for Canadian audiences to experience art by people of African descent. It empowered artists by affirming black women’s unique artistic contributions. Furthermore, the exhibition confronted the dominant Eurocentric perspectives set on denigrating ethnocultural art as second-rate Outsider art.

The artworks displayed in the exhibition employed a variety of media, which ranged from textiles, wooden boxes and tree branches to dolls (Chloë Onari), Haitian vèvè (Barbara Prézeau-Stephenson), music and incense. Artworks by Khadejha McCall, Buseje Bailey and Grace Channer presented representations of the Black female body that challenged colonial stereotypes and explored different perspectives to redefine the image of women of African descent.

=== Reception ===
The exhibition received critical acclaim for its bold approach and necessary intervention in the Canadian art landscape. Many critics praised it for addressing the lack of representation for Black women artists in Canada. A review in Canadian Art noted the exhibition’s success in ‘creating sites of resistance in which they confronted cultural stereotypes about Black women, Black women artists and their artistic practices.’

=== Exhibition Dates ===
- A Space, Toronto, Ontario: January 28 - February 25, 1989
- Houseworks, Ottawa, Ontario: March 2–29, 1989
- XChanges, Victoria, British Columbia: May 11–27, 1989
- Articule, Montreal, Quebec: June 24 - September 23, 1989
- Eye Level, Halifax, Nova Scotia, September 6–23, 1989

=== Participating artists ===
- Buseje Bailey
- Claire Carew
- Grace Channer
- Winsom Darrell
- Dzian Lacharité
- Khadejha (Irva Mae) McCall
- Kim (Mosa) McNeilly
- Foluke Olubayo
- Chloe Onari
- Barbara Prézeau-Stephenson
- Sulih Williams

== About the Organizers ==
The Diasporic African Women’s Art Collective (DAWA) was founded in 1984 by Grace Channer, Buseje Bailey, Foluké Olubaiyu, Pauline Peters and Dzi..An (Dzian Lacharatié). It was created as a nonprofit community network with the goal of promoting Black women’s culture in Canada. DAWA’s founding came about during a time when anti-racist, feminist and queer activists were questioning dominant conversations about Canada's national identity politics.

Founding member Buseje Bailey described that DAWA allowed Black women as space to display their art, when they were ignored by the majority of art institutions.

== 30th Anniversary: The Feast ==
On Friday, January 25, 2019, a performative dinner was held at the Art Gallery of Ontario featuring 100 Black women artists and cultural workers to mark the 30th anniversary of the exhibition Black Wimmin: When and Where We Enter. The anniversary event was organized by the collective Black Wimmin Artist, a community of over 100 Black women and gender non-conforming artists and cultural workers in Canada founded in 2016 by artist Anique Jordan.

== Practice as Ritual/Ritual as Practice ==
In 2022, the exhibition Practice as Ritual/Ritual as Practice, curated by Andrea Fatona at was presented A Space Gallery in Toronto and in 2023 at articule, an artist-run centre in Montréal. The exhibition featured contemporary work by ten of the participants in Black Wimmin: When and Where We Enter. The show was dedicated to the memory of Khadejha McCall and Chloe Onari.

== Further research ==
Archives of the exhibition held at EyeLevel Gallery in Halifax, Nova Scotia are conserved at Dalhousie University Archives. Documents from the archival fonds can be consulted online.
