= Diasporic African Women's Art Collective =

Artistic group

The Diasporic African Women’s Art Collective (DAWA) is a collective of Black women artists based in Canada. It was founded in 1984 by Grace Channer, Buseje Bailey, Foluké Olubaiyu, Pauline Peters and DZI..AN (Dzian Lacharité). DAWA was a non-profit community network of Black Canadian women artists. The word DAWA means "medicine" in Kiswahili.

Buseje Bailey describes that DAWA allowed Black women a space to display their art when they were ignored by the majority of art institutions. The collective sought to address the lack of venues and support for Black Women artists in the art world and promote Black Women’s culture in Canada.

The DAWA collective were featured in a 2019 performative dinner at the Art Gallery of Ontario entitled The Feast: A Gathering of 100 Black Wimmin Artists organized by the (BWA) Black Wimmin Artist Collective, initiated by artist Anique Jordan.

In 2019, the collective regrouped to contribute works to a new touring exhibition entitled Practice as Ritual/Ritual as Practice.

== Participating artists ==
Members of the DAWA collective include the following artists:

- Buseje Bailey
- Claire Carew
- Grace Channer
- Winsom Darrell
- Dzian Lacharité
- Khadejha (Irva Mae) McCall
- Kim (Mosa) McNeilly
- Foluke Olubayo
- Chloe Onari
- Barbara Prézeau-Stephenson
- Sulih Williams

== Exhibitions ==
=== Black Wimmin, When and Where We Enter ===
In 1989, founding members of DAWA curated the exhibition Black Wimmin, When and Where We Enter. It was the first major exhibition in Canada to be curated by and to feature exclusively the artworks of Black women. The exhibition toured across Canada from the Atlantic region to Victoria, British Columbia. The galleries included on the tour were A SPACE, in Toronto, Ontario; HOUSEWORKS, in Ottawa Ontario; X-CHANGES in Victoria British Columbia; ARTICULE, in Montreal, Quebec; and EYE LEVEL, in Halifax, Nova Scotia.

Art historian Alice Ming Wai Jim writes that DAWA's curatorial project, the exhibition Black Wimmin, When and Where We Enter, in 1989 was a point of entry into the Canadian Art scene for Black women artists who were largely ignored by art institutions. Jim also writes that the emergence of DAWA came at a time when ongoing debates about multiculturalism were common in Canadian society, and significant feminist and queer activism was happening across the country.

=== The Feast ===
On January 25, 2019, the Art Gallery of Ontario hosted a performance called The Feast. This event was a collaboration between the AGO and the collective Black Wimmin Artists (BWA) and took the form of a performative dining exchange where 100 Black women and gender non-conforming artists occupied the Art Gallery of Ontario’s Walker Court. Although artist Anique Jordan did not initially intend to set The Feast at this date, the event honoured the 30th anniversary of the opening of Black Wimmin: When and Where We Enter. Four original members of DAWA, Grace Channer, Buseje Bailey, Dzian Lacharité, and Mosa McNeilly were in attendance.

=== Practice as Ritual/Ritual as Practice ===
In 2022 and 2023, the curator and scholar Andrea Fatona curated the exhibition Practice as Ritual/Ritual as Practice, a touring exhibition featuring 10 of the artists that appeared in the exhibition Black Wimmin, When and Where We Enter. The exhibition was presented at A Space Gallery, an artist-run centre in Toronto and at articule, an artist-run centre in Montréal. The exhibition presented mostly new works by DAWA artists and the artworks included various mediums such as paintings, photography, text, installation, video, augmented reality, and sculpture. The artworks address themes of intergenerational dialogue, knowledge sharing, healing, care, and the act of remembering.
