= Grace Channer =

Canadian visual artist (born 1959)

- Born: 1959 (age 66–67); Britain
- Education: BFA, Queen's University; Postgraduate Diploma in Animation Filmmaking, Sheridan College; MFA, York University; PhD (in progress), Brock University
- Occupation: Visual artist
- Known for: Painting, Multimedia art, Film
- Notable work: Black Women Working, It Takes Courage to Imagine Peace, But Some Are Brave
- Movement: Feminist art, African-Canadian art, Queer art
- Awards: Audience Award, 21st International Lesbian Feminist Film Festival (2009); Third Place, Africa World Documentary Film Festival (2009)

Grace Channer (born 1959) is an African-Canadian painter and multi-media visual artist.

== Education ==
Born in Britain, Channer studied in the Bachelor of Fine Arts degree program at Queen's University from 1977 to 1978. She also earned a postgraduate diploma in Animation Filmmaking from Sheridan College Institute of Technology and Advanced Learning.

== Artistic career ==
In 1987, along with painter Lynne Fernie, photographer Cyndra MacDowall, and filmmaker Marg Moores, Channer contributed to an exhibit titled Sight Specific: Lesbians and Representation. The exhibit explored connections between lesbian and artistic identities, relationships, narratives and politics. The same year, Channer was one of six artists invited to participate in a site-specific mural project, Women On Site, curated by Sarah Denison for the A Space Community Arts Committee. Channer's mural, titled "Black Women Working", was located at the Parkdale Library in Toronto. Channer is a member of the Diasporic African Women’s Art Collective (DAWA). She co-curated the travelling exhibition Black Wimmin: When and Where We Enter with Buseje Bailey in 1989. Channer is the subject, alongside artist Faith Nolan, of Dionne Brand's 1993 documentary film, Long Time Comin', which explores the activism inherent in the practice of both artists. The movie is available for viewing on the ONF's website. In 1998, Channer participated to Taking It to the Streets, which was a series of public art projects taking place in the Greater Toronto area organized by SAVAC (South Asian Visual Arts Collective). Channer took part of the Street Art Postering Project to which she contributed posters like It takes Courage to Imagine Peace in collaboration with Melanie Liwanag Aguila, Courtnay McFarlane, Beeta M. Jafari and Tanya Lena and another one titled Gay and Lesbian Human Rights in collaboration with Aguila and McFarlane.

In 2005, Channer participated in the exhibition Tribute: The Art of African Canadians curated by Robert Freeman and David Sommers at the Art Gallery of Peel and the Art Gallery of Mississauga. Channer contributed to the exhibition her work Intolerance (1982), which is an oil triptych of a panoramic landscape echoeing the work of Hieronymus Bosch and Peter Bruegel through its exploration of themes and elements of the medieval tradition of fantasy, allegory and biblical proverbs. Channer infuses this tradition of the medieval allegorical triptyc with the contemporary theme of hierarchical power. Channer paints local community scenes that reveal some social or moral controversies which explore, in their unfolding, topics such as power, abuse, sex, sexuality, race, class, and religion. In 2009, Channer participated to the 21st International Lesbian Feminist Film Festival of Paris with her short-length film But Some Are Brave where she won the Audience Award. Channer is a member of the W5ART Collective, an artist collective established in 2011 by Buseje Bailey, Grace Channer, Alexandra Gelis, Margie Macdonald and Alexandra Majerus. In 2012, Channer was one of three artists, along with Sandra Brewster and Jay Stewart, who painted a 100-foot long mural celebrating women in visual and martial arts. Located in the East-end of Toronto, the public art piece is titled KIA: Unified Movement of Power, and it celebrates the strength of martial arts movement.

== Exhibitions ==
"Who Will Fight For Our Liberation," Power Plant Gallery, 1992.

"Tribute: The Art of African Canadians," Art Gallery of Peel (Brampton, Ont.) & Art Gallery of Mississauga (Mississauga, Ont.), 2005.

== Awards ==
In 2009, Grace Channer won third place in the short length category for her film But Some Are Brave at the Africa World Documentary Film Festival.

In 2009, Channer also won the Audience Award for But Some Are Brave at the 21st International Lesbian Feminist Film Festival of Paris.
