= Andrea Fatona =

Art curator and scholar

Andrea Fatona is a Canadian independent curator and scholar. She is an associate professor at OCAD University, where she specializes in black, contemporary art and curatorial studies.

== Early life ==
In 2011, Fatona received her PhD from the University of Toronto (OISE). Titled "Where Outreach Meets Outrage: Racial Equity policy formation at the Canada Council for the Arts (1989-1999)", her dissertation examined policy and practice regarding the racial equity at the Canada Council for the Arts. Fatona was a member of the Canada Council Equity advisory committee for the Visual Arts section between 2003 and 2005.

== Career ==
Fatona held curatorial positions at Artspeak in Vancouver, the Art Gallery of Ottawa, Artspace Peterborough, and Video In (Vancouver). She curated a show of the work of Winsom, a Belize-based Canadian and Maroon artist, at the gallery.

Her research contributed to the Hogan's Alley, Vancouver memorial project that memorializes Black cultural history in Vancouver. CBC Arts placed Fatona at the forefront of the Black cultural movement in Canada.

In 2015, Fatona led the Social Sciences and Humanities Research Council-funded research project: State of Blackness: From Production to Presentation Conference. The project addressed art education and Blackness in Canadian art curricula.

In 2020, Fatona obtained a Tier 2 Canada Research Chair in Canadian Black Diasporic Cultural Production, which aims to make visible and provide access to the works of contemporary Black artists, craftspeople, curators, and critics in Canada. Led by Andrea Fatona, on March 18, 2021, OCAD University inaugurated its Center for the Study of the Black Canadian Diaspora.

== Curated exhibitions ==
Co-curator, Land Marks (touring exhibition Chatham, Windsor, Peterborough). The Thames Art Gallery, Chatham, Ont. (originating gallery), 2013 -2015.

Curator, Edna Paterson-Petty: African-American Quilts. The Ottawa Art Gallery, Ottawa, ON, 2011.

Co-curator, Alex Wyse- Wyse Works: Exposing the Inevitable. The Ottawa Art Gallery, Ottawa, ON, 2011.

Initiator and coordinator of Will Work for Food, a community arts project involving Sandy Hill Community Health Centre and Operation Come Home as primary community partners. The Ottawa Art Gallery, Ottawa, ON, 2010.

Curator, Avaaz. Sound installation by Dipna Horra. The Ottawa Art Gallery, Ottawa, ON, 2010.

Curator, Intersections. Paintings by artist-programmer Eric Sze-Lang. The Ottawa Art Gallery, Ottawa, ON, 2010.

Curator, Duncan de Kergommeaux: These Are the Marks I Make "a survey exhibition of painter Duncan de Kergommeaux that spans 50 years of the artist's life. The Ottawa Art Gallery, Ottawa, Ont., Museum London, 2010.

Curator, Fibred Optics, group exhibition that explores the multi-sensorial nature of visual narration and perception. Frances Dorsey, Jerome Havre, Ed Pien and Michele Provost. The Ottawa Art Gallery, Ottawa, ON, 2009 and Richmond Art Gallery, Richmond, B.C. in 2011.

Curator in collaboration with Deanna Bowen, Reading the Image: Poetics of the Black Diaspora, group, national touring exhibition "Deanna Bowen, Maud Sulter, Christopher Cozier and Michael Fernandes - that explores issues pertaining to diasporic movement and the relationship of African peoples to the project of modernity. Thames Art Gallery, Chatham, Ont. (originating gallery); Robert McLaughlin Gallery, Oshawa, Ontario; Mount Saint Vincent University Art Gallery, Halifax, Nova Scotia; Yukon Art Centre, Whitehorse, Yukon Territory, 2006.

Curator, The Attack of the Sandwich Man, solo exhibition by Chris Cozier (Trinidad), video collaboration with Richard Fung; addresses issues related to nation- making, culture, the politics of gender and the post- colonial Caribbean. A Space Gallery, Toronto, ON, 2001.

== Bibliography ==
- 2018 Book chapter, "Claiming Space: The Development of Black Canadian Cultural Activism of the 1980s and 1990s" Ed. Nelson, Charmaine A. Towards an African Canadian Art History Art, Memory, Resistance. Concord, Ont.: Captus Press Inc., 2018.
- 2015 Catalogue essay, Objects, Histories, and Memory, in conjunction with the exhibition, “Mining Memory: Sylvia D. Hamilton”, Thames Art Gallery, Chatham, ON
- 2013 Book chapter, "Arts funding, the State, and Canadian Nation-making" in Critical Canadian Studies, eds, Lynn Caldwell, Darryl Leroux, Carianne Leung. NS: Fernwood Press
- 2011 Interview with Duncan de Kergommeaux in catalogue These Are the Marks I make: Duncan de Kergommeaux, The Ottawa Art Gallery and Museum London co- publication
- 2010 Catalogue essay, Network Installations: Marie-Josée Laframboise, Musée d'art de Joliette, The Ottawa Art Gallery and Southern Alberta Art Gallery co-publication
- 2009 Catalogue essay, Fibred Optics exhibition, The Ottawa Art Gallery, Ottawa, ON
- 2007 "Bring It Back: Thinking the Ethno-Politics of Identity Again" with Aruna Srivastava and Rinaldo Walcott, FUSE Magazine, Vol.30, #4 2006 Catalogue essay, Reading the Image: Poetics of the Black Diaspora, Thames Art Gallery, Chatham, ON.
- 2006 "In the Presence of Absence: Invisibility, Black Canadian History, and Melinda Mollineaux's Pinhole Photography", Canadian Journal of Communication, Vol. 31, 227-238
- 2005 "Social Justice Education through a School-Community Partnership in Media Arts–, Orbit: OISE/UT's Magazine for Schools, Vol. 35, No. 2 2005 –In the Presence of Absence: My response to re- presentations of an Emancipation Day picnic–, Small Axe: Journal of Caribbean Criticism (on-line edition)
- 2002 Contributor, 13 Conversations about art and cultural race politics, eds. Monika Kin Gagnon and Richard Fung. Artexte Editions, Montreal.
