= Ociciwan Contemporary Art Collective =

Canadian artist collective involving Indigenous artists

Ociciwan Contemporary Art Collective is a Canadian artist collective based in Edmonton, Alberta with a mandate to develop innovative and experimental projects involving Indigenous artists.

== History ==
Established in 2015 in Edmonton, Alberta, Canada, on Treaty 6 territory, the founding core collective members were Tiffany Shaw-Collinge, Erin Sutherland, Becca Taylor, and Kristy Trinier. Current Core Collective members include Tiffany Shaw-Collinge, Erin Sutherland, Becca Taylor, Halie Finney and Alberta Rose W. From the collectives' website:

The name Ociciwan is an inanimate Plains Cree noun relating to current or river, translated to mean the current comes from there. The name references the North Saskatchewan River that has brought many people over time to the region. It conveys an energy of engagement with Indigenous contemporary culture, linking present with the past and the future."

The collective focuses on three to four projects a year, which include art exhibitions, research, public art works and awareness surrounding Indigenous contemporary art. Ociciwan aims to support the work of Indigenous contemporary artists and designers, engage in both local and global contemporary critical dialogue, develop artistic collaboration, promote and encourage research, production, presentation and awareness of Indigenous contemporary art practices.

== Ociciwan Contemporary Art Centre ==
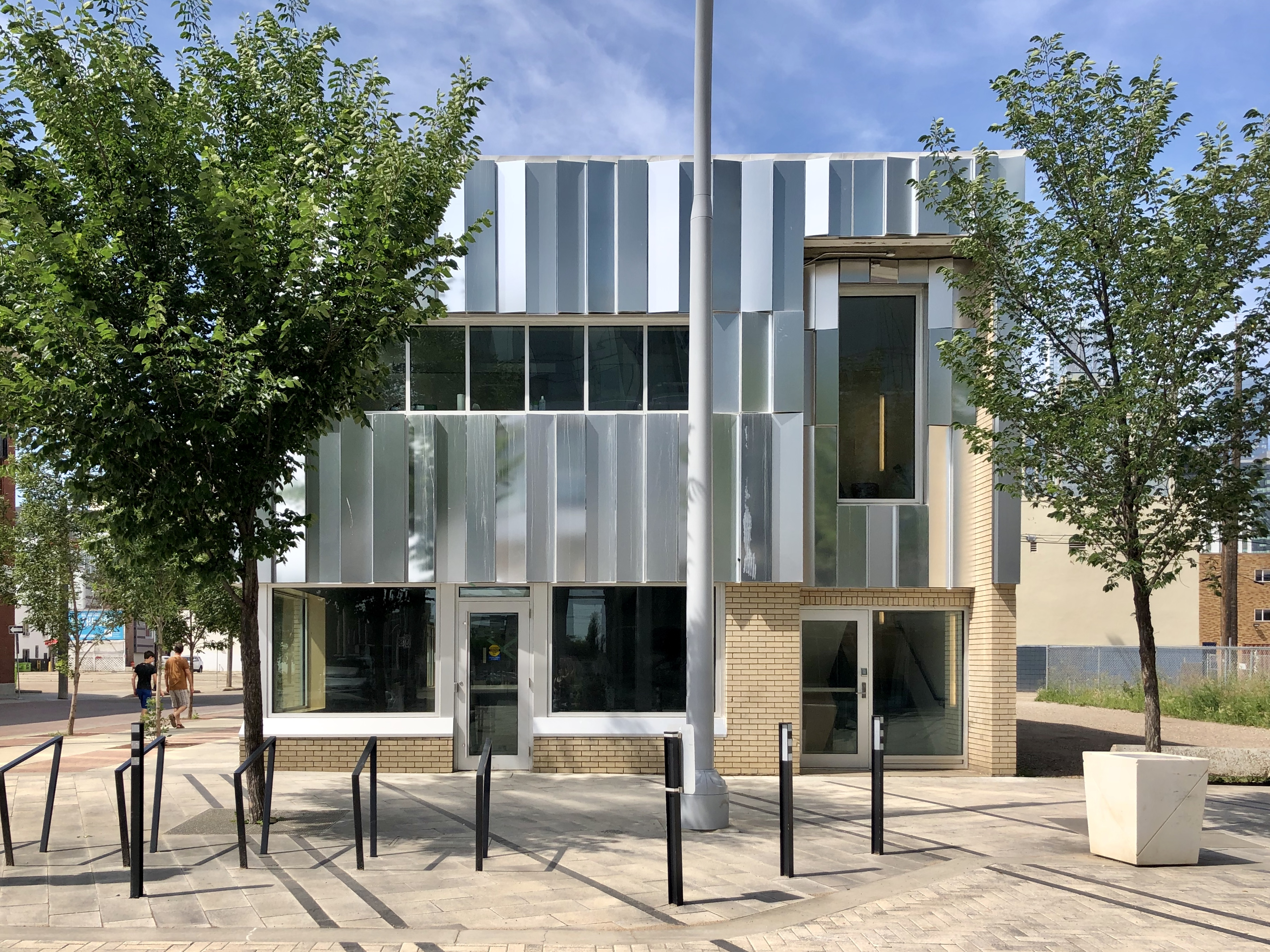
The new Ociciwan Contemporary Art Center at 10124 96 Street in downtown Edmonton.

In Fall 2018, Ociciwan announced that the collective would be opening the Ociciwan Contemporary Art Centre in a retrofitted, 6,945 square-foot, two-storey building in downtown Edmonton. The space, designed by Rockliff Pierzchajlo Kroman Architects, will include a kitchen, resource library, community space, and offices for rent in addition to gallery space. The Ociciwan Contemporary Art Centre will be the first Indigenous-run contemporary art centre in Edmonton.

Ociciwan's grand opening exhibition at the new space, amiskwacîwâskahikan, had been planned for March 2020. Just two weeks before the event, the gallery was forced to delay the opening indefinitely due to COVID-19. In June 2020, the gallery was the target of a theft, including new media equipment and a piece by Lana Whiskeyjack slated for the opening exhibition. The stolen artwork is a beaded medallion crafted with deer lace and rabbit fur titled Three Generations of nitêh (my heart). In a public plea to find the piece, Whiskeyjack said, "the significance of the work is much more than the monetary value — it is a creative practice of paradigm shifting to help address the violence against Indigenous People as well as to help lift their spirits and cultural awareness."

== Major Projects ==
- Scene Report, with Wendy. Walter Scott. Stanley A. Milner Library, Edmonton, AB. 2015.
- How to Tell a Story. Brenda Draney. University of Alberta Museums Enterprise Square Galleries, Edmonton, AB. 2016.
- A Parallel Excavation: Duane Linklater & Tanya Lukin Linklater. Art Gallery of Alberta, Edmonton, AB. 2016.
- Urban Spaces. Tanya Harnett & Jeff Thomas. Edmonton, AB. 2016.
- Writing Workshop. Sky Goodden. Edmonton Arts Council and Manasc Isaac Architects. Edmonton, AB. 2016.
- The Shawls Project. Faye HeavyShield with Moving the Mountain Youth. Edmonton City Hall. Edmonton, AB. 2016.
- Big 'Uns. Dayna Danger. Latitude 53 Contemporary Visual Culture. Edmonton, AB. 2017.
- in memoriam... Postcommodity and Alex Waterman. Banff Centre for Arts and Creativity and Francis Winspear Centre for Music. Banff, AB and Edmonton, AB. 2017.
- Horse Camp. Brittney Bear Hat and Richelle Bear Hat. Emily Murphy Park, Edmonton, AB and AKA artist-run, Saskatoon, SK. 2017.
- Indigenous Fashion & Wearable Art at WCFW Fall 2017. Jeneen Frei Njootli, Meghann O'Brien, & Sage Paul. ATB Financial Arts Barns. Edmonton, AB. 2017.
- Arrivals: Tamara Lee-Anne Cardinal, Dan Cardinal McCartney, Laura Grier, and Sarah Houle. dc3 Art Projects. Edmonton, AB. 2018.
- Current Terrain: Bruno Canadien, Brenda Draney, Jessie Ray Short, Adrian Stimson, and Alberta Rose W. A Space Gallery. Toronto, ON. 2018.
- Indigenous Birthing Film Screening: The Ephemerals, Jules Koostachin, and Rebeka Tabobondung. Mitchell Art Gallery, MacEwan University. Edmonton, AB. 2019.
- Métis Kitchen Table Talk on Methodologies of Making: Kathy Mattes and Sherry Farrell Racette. CKUA Edmonton. Edmonton, AB. 2019.
- Resemblance: Halie Finney and Dwayne Martineau. Parallel Space. Edmonton, AB. 2020.
