= Dayna Danger =

Visual artist

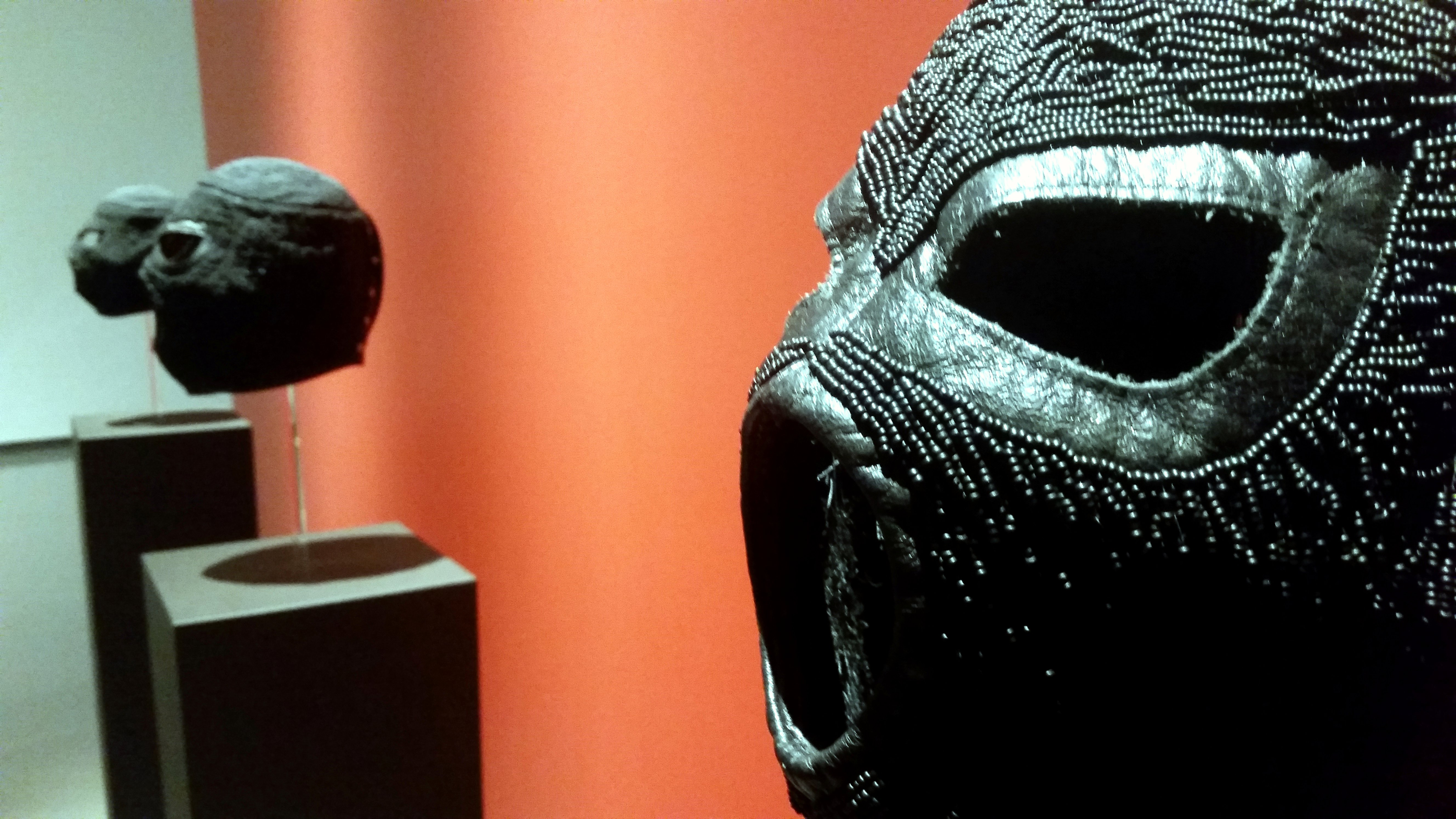
Danger's BDSM leather beaded fetish masks on exhibit at the Winnipeg Art Gallery

Dayna Danger is a Two-Spirit/queer, hard femme, Métis/Saulteaux/Polish visual artist. Danger was born and raised in Winnipeg, Manitoba on Treaty 1 territory, and now resides in Tio'tiá:ke (Montréal). Danger explores various mediums in their creations including sculpture, photography, performance and video. Danger's work explores the relationships between representation, objectification, and empowerment. They also engage with themes of intimacy, gender, sexuality, BDSM, kink, and mixed identities. Danger's artwork from their Big'Uns series was on the front cover of the Summer 2017 Canadian Art Magazine issue. A white male curator once commented that he "could not see himself" in Danger's art, and Danger's response was that "[t]his work is not for you." Later, when Danger's photo from Big'Uns was made the cover of the issue, the editor's letter for the issue was titled "This Work Is Not For You". Collaboration and creating work for underrepresented groups are among Danger's major focuses. Danger uses singular they/them pronouns.

== Education ==
Danger graduated with a Bachelor of Fine Arts (Honours) from The University of Manitoba's School of art in 2010. They were mentored from 2012 to 2013 by Amber-Dawn Bear Robe and Daina Warren through the Mentoring Artists for Women's Art's (MAWA's) Foundation Mentorship Program. Danger obtained a master's degree in Fine Arts in Photography from Concordia University in 2017. They completed a Visual Arts Studio Work Study at the Banff Centre. Danger later participated in the Candice Hopkins and Raven Chacon's residency, titled Trading Post. In addition, Danger completed a Residency at Plug In Institute of Contemporary Art. Danger was also an Artist in Residence through the Initiative for Indigenous Futures at AbTeC. As well, Danger participates in feminist and Indigenous activist work as acting Programming and Campaigns Coordinator at the Centre for Gender Advocacy in Montreal. Danger's feminist and Indigenous activist work often shares the same themes as their art.

== Indigeneity ==
Danger is of Métis and Saulteaux heritage, and is a member of the Manitoba Métis Federation. Through their work, they aim to empower and create space for those who are largely excluded from media or who are misrepresented, with a focus on Indigenous peoples and those who identify as 2Spirit, queer, trans, and non-binary. Danger states: "Space is really important to Indigenous people. If we're literally waiting to get our land back, maybe I can try at least to claim space in other ways." They have collaborated with Indigenous artists and communities to complete various projects.

Danger's collaborations with Indigenous artists and community members have been important for the revitalization of Indigenous culture, knowledge, and language. Through work on projects such as their beaded fetish masks, which Danger describes as requiring a lot of "kitchen table work", Danger has created ties and relationships with community members. Accordingly, their work has facilitated a time for the exchange of Indigenous knowledge and revitalization of Indigenous language. The latter has occurred through conversations about terminology, specifically surrounding BDSM and kink practices.

Through their work in BDSM and kink, Danger claims these practices as Indigenous while also proposing their use as a means through which to heal from trauma. Danger believes that BDSM and kink have unique meaning for Indigenous peoples, and can facilitate conversations about consent, trauma, and healing while building a sense of trust and community. These practices can open up a space for marginalized individuals to be themselves, which Danger states "is the real healing work". In addition, BDSM and kink represent a way that Indigenous people can regain power while showcasing their resilience.

Danger acts as a board member for the Aboriginal Curatorial Collective/Collectif des commissaires autochthones (ACC/CCA), a non-profit organization founded by Indigenous curators. Through their work with the ACC, Danger promotes and furthers the goal of the organization to support and connect Indigenous curators, artists, writers, academics, and professionals.

== Art practice ==
A recurring theme of Danger's art is personal identity, they interact with and through their own experience of identity to subvert "taboos about Indigenous sex and sexuality". Another major theme is exploring and deconstructing relationships of subjectivity and power, often to create space "for people traditionally excluded from galleries and mainstream media to represent them in new ways". Danger engages with themes typically seen in mainstream pornography as well as contemporary fashion publications, which contain connotations of commodification and objectification. Danger aims to subvert these discourses and reclaim these themes as sites for empowerment and representation. Their work often demonstrates a subversion of "social and cultural power dynamics", and aims to spark conversation about Indigenous sex and sensuality. Danger's work contributes to women, trans, and non-binary people's representation in the art world, and aims to return the colonial gaze. Danger uses photography, video, performance, and beading in their art practice. Unlike many artists, Danger likes to keep some of their projects ongoing, allowing for more voices and volunteers in their work. They explain, "Big 'Uns is still ongoing—as long as there's a rack and someone who's willing to pose with the rack, I will continue to do Big'Uns. There are over 60 individuals who are in that work now, by volunteering." Collaboration is key to their art, as their projects rely on building relationships and community between the artist and the subjects. "If I'm having these feelings, maybe other folks are having these experiences" Danger explains, "One experience you have may be very well felt by others, and you may not even know it."

=== Photography ===
One of the major types of media Danger utilizes in their art practice is photography. Danger has produced several photographic series, including Sisters, Big 'Uns, and Bad Girls. Other photographic works include Queering Intimacy (2017), and two separate but related works To Parmeet with Love and To Myself with Love (2019) which depict images of leather bondage harnesses and a rack of antlers secured on a board.

==== Bad Girls (2010) ====
Exhibited at the Gallery of Student Art at the University of Manitoba in 2010, Bad Girls is a photo series inspired by "scandalous and intriguing women throughout history." Danger takes the Renaissance genre of historical paintings and sexualizes them, reworking them in a modern light to empower, and give control to, the female subject. As Danger grew up Catholic, this project explores what women "should be" doing, and redefines what that looks like: redefining the term "bad girl". In an interview with The Manitoban, Danger explained "It made me realize, heck yes, I would love to be a bad girl if it meant I could rise above what society expected of me and what I needed to accomplish."

==== Sisters (2015) ====
Danger's work Sisters is a photography series depicting themselves and their sister, Michelle, which was taken over two years. Sisters was the first project in which Danger became subject in their own work. This project explores the relationship between family, sisters, and kinship through photographs, using Danger and their sister—after a long period of separation—as its subjects. According to Danger's website, it provided "a time to process both the pain and love shared between sisters, and a chance to forge a different future for each other." The series explores themes of reconnection, love, baggage, and sisterly bonds.

==== Big 'Uns (2017) ====
Danger's work Big 'Uns is an ongoing photography series which began in Alberta, where local subjects were photographed in April 2017. The photographs feature women rubbed in baby oil with antlers strapped onto their sexual parts. Antlers are a motif in the work, which Danger uses to comment on sports hunting. Their photographs exhibit a crossover between sport hunting and the patriarchal treatment of women, hence the project's namesake. Big 'Uns refers to "big ones"—large breasts and antlers—showing how large, male antlers are given the same treatment as large breasts on women. According to Danger's website, the antlers "and the tension that they cause, allude to the many factors that women must contend with in order to have healthy relationships, positive self-image, and, of course, sexual relationships. For us these factors include the first-hand experience and/or the intergenerational effects of residential schooling, sexual abuse, and the unrealistic portrayal of our bodies by the media." Overall, the work "explores the reclaiming of the bodies and sexualities of trans, non-binary, femme, and female-identified individuals".

=== Collaborative practice ===
Danger focuses on consent in their work, which often manifests through their use of collaborative methods. Along with several collaborative exhibits, collaboration is seen in Danger's art practice through the consulting, inclusion, and compensation of the Indigenous, two-spirit, queer, and trans communities represented in their work. When creating their beaded BDSM masks, Danger hired and paid other Indigenous folks for their contributing work in the assemblage and beading processes. When producing photographs, Danger consults subjects and continually attains consent to have a more collaborative approach rather than reproducing a colonial gaze and the dichotomy of subject and photographer. This method furthers Danger's themes of decolonizing sexuality as they work "in collaboration with other queer and two-spirit Indigenous kin to create portraits that visually assert Indigenous sexualities, claim space for a sovereign erotic, and reposition the dominance of the colonial gaze". In order to collaborate consensually and respectfully, Danger often appears in their own art. They explain how their responsibility as an artist requires a constant awareness of the consent and safety of their subjects—which is why Danger often slips into their shoes: "[My subjects] essentially let me use their image to represent my work. That comes with a lot of responsibility. Often in photography or as artists, we claim somebody's image just because we're an artist, or we photograph them... Yes, [the project] is our idea, but if you're working with people, there is that level of consent and trust that you need to build, especially because of the type of work that I do. Really putting yourself out there has to do with vulnerability... I want to know what the folks that are sitting for me are going through. To be in that position of power you always have to be questioning it. How can we ask folks to be visible when society isn't ready or educated to understand different ways of being and knowing? What would the world look like if my kin could just be safe? So, it was very important to me to also be a part of that [experience]."

== Empowerment of queer and gender variant peoples ==
Dayna Danger's life pursuits frequently cite or work towards the liberation and representation of Indigenous-Queer, Two-Spirited, and gender variant peoples. Danger facilitates this work through a variety of mediums, including advocacy, community-building, and artwork. This work hinges on converting existing spaces, such as BDSM, porn, and fashion, into areas which empower Two-Spirited, Queer, and gender variant peoples.

=== BDSM, kink, and consent in reclaiming space ===
Danger specifically cites here interest in BDSM (Bondage/Domination, Dominance/Submission, Sadism/Masochism) as a cite for power exchange. For Danger, BDSM opens a dialogue which could be characterized as limited within more "traditional" spaces which might otherwise marginalize gender variant, Indigenous-Queer, Two-Spirited, and Trans peoples. In opening this dialogue, Danger deconstructs tropes of BDSM being limited to non-Indigenous peoples, and, instead, promotes the ability for BDSM to promote the beauty of Indigenous-Queer peoples. This work negotiates the line of power and objectification, while relying on an inherent consent model in BDSM which promotes the positive sexual agency of engaging parties. They explore BDSM and kink specifically through leather and beaded works, "as a space for healing colonial trauma". Danger has produced a series of masks that resemble BDSM gear but are beaded in a traditional Indigenous style. Their idea to create these fully-beaded BDSM masks began as a joke—Danger explains: "It was this total joke, thinking of the most native BDSM thing ever, which would be a full fetish bodysuit, but beaded — just wrap yourself in beads." Because making a full fetish bodysuit would have taken too long to make, Danger began beading fetish masks. The practice of beading the masks takes up to 100 hours and was inspired by Danger's mother who made cultural art as well. As such, Danger finds comfort in beading the masks because they have many vivid memories of their mother working on beading and crafting projects: "'There's this big fluorescent light she would put on, and she had all her crafting supplies in the basement, where she would make little dreamcatchers and earrings. I remember being so comforted by that, just knowing that that weird fluorescent light was on ... I saw that act of making as comfort.'" Thus, the masks represent a form of comfort and a connection to their Indigenous culture and traditions. The masks are also a means of disguising identity and grappling with the existence of agency and consent within a colonial environment.

=== Intersectionalism ===
Dayna Danger's work specifically focuses on an element of cultural restoration and expansion of culturally safe spaces by integrating and welcoming in Indigenous-Queer peoples. Such work views the integration of Queer peoples as overcoming a colonially imposed barrier which has limited the acceptance of Indigenous-Queer peoples into certain protocol. In addition to facilitating spaces which are safe to specifically Indigenous-Queer peoples, this work promotes a revitalization and healing of the community by overcoming colonially imposed norms and values which have otherwise ostracized the people Danger advocates and works on behalf of. Danger's work in beaded fetish masks specifically speaks to this intersectional approach, with Danger commenting that "there is something so beautiful [about] wearing something that is completely covered in beads on your face" and that "this is a continuation of how we communicate symbols that are important to us. For me, beadwork speaks to that. It's a basic read of what is truly resistance. Before glass beads, we still figured out ways to embellish what we wore. Glass beads just intuitively took that on and made it a part of how we represent ourselves."

=== Expanding "traditionalism" and deconstructing heteronormativity within Indigenous communities ===
Danger highlights a reclamation of space for 2SLGBTQQ+ people within traditional spaces which could be constricted due to the colonial implantation of heteronormativity and homophobia. Rather than delegitimizing these spaces, Danger's work presents itself in an integrative and communitarian fashion which expands existing spaces, such as those encapsulated in BDSM, or through 2-Spirit Drum Groups, to include marginalized voices in a more authentic fashion. Danger notes that people who don't conform to typical gender roles can become isolated from their communities, and that "they have a hard time getting employment, they have a hard time finding housing" amongst other difficulties. Danger further explains that losing that sense of place "where we migrate away from our land, our territories and away from out teachings" puts non-binary people at risk.

== Exhibits ==
=== Various exhibits ===
- Urban Shaman, Winnipeg, MB
- Warren G Flowers Art Gallery, Montreal
- dc3 Projects, Edmonton
- Roundhouse Cafe, Vancouver
- New Mexico Museum of Art, Santa Fe
- Disrupt Archives

=== Nos Territoires/Indian Land ===
Nos Territoires/Indian Land was exhibited September 15, 2018 in Montreal, Quebec, and included several performance pieces by Indigenous artists. Danger wore one of their masks and performed a purification ceremony with traditional herbs. The performance blurred "the boundaries between performance and ritual art".

=== Sisters ===
"Sisters" was exhibited May 8 to July 4, 2015, at Artspace in Peterborough, Ontario. It exhibited Danger's "Sisters" photography series during their first solo exhibit.

=== Big 'Uns ===
"Big 'Uns" was exhibited June 9 to July 22, 2017, at Latitude 53 in Edmonton, Alberta. It was the second solo exhibit, featuring Danger's Big 'Uns photography series. This exhibit was put on in partnership with the Ociciwan Contemporary Art Collective.

=== Not the Camera, But the Filing Cabinet: Performative Body Archives in Contemporary Art ===
"Not the Camera, But the Filing Cabinet: Performative Body Archives in Contemporary Art" was exhibited from September 13 to November 24, 2018, at Gallery 1C03 at the University of Winnipeg in Manitoba. The multi-artist exhibit featured the diverse artwork media of ten national and international artists who were women, queer and/or non-binary: Susan Aydan Abbott, Sarah Ciurysek, Dayna Danger, Christina Hajjar, Kablusiak, Ayqa Khan, Luna, Matea Radio, Sophie Sabet and Leesa Streifler [4]. The curator was Noor Bhangu. Themes of the exhibit centered processing and working through experiences, solidarity and knowledges under settler colonialism, gendered violence and capitalism. It featured Danger's photography Gi Jiit (2017) from their photography series Big'Uns.

=== Forward Facing ===
"FORWARD FACING" was exhibited from April 21 to June 3, 2018, at Critical Distance Center for Curators in Toronto, Ontario. It was a multi-artist exhibit featuring Lacie Burning, Jade Nasogaluak Carpenter and Dayna Danger. All three artists collaborated on a performance April 21, 2018 "negotiating time, boundaries and songs". In addition, Danger held a "Bike Tube Flogger-Making Workshop" on April 22, 2018. The curator was Cass Gardiner in partnership with Aboriginal Curatorial Collective. The exhibit featured Danger's BDSM leather beaded fetish masks and the exhibit surrounded masks as safety and solidarity while exploring Indigenous identity.

=== Conflicting Heroes ===
"Conflicting Heroes" was exhibited from June 8 to August 4, 2017, at Art Mur in Berlin, Germany. The multi-artist exhibit featured ten Indigenous artists: David Garneau, Caroline Monnet, Dayna Danger, Sonny Assu, Skawennati, Natalie Ball, Leonard Getinthecar, Nep Sidhu, Kent Monkman and Jessie Ray Short. The curator was Michael Pattena and the themes explored North American settler colonial discourse and the various heroes throughout North American history. The exhibit featured Danger's BDSM leather beaded fetish masks.

=== Disrupt Archive ===
"Disrupt Archive" was exhibited from March 18 to April 15, 2016, at La Centrale in Montreal, Quebec. The dual-artist exhibit featured Dayna Danger and Cecilia Kavara Verran. The curator was Heather Igloliorte. The exhibit explored settler colonialism's historical legacy of the removal of Indigenous cultural objects by Western settler institutions. The exhibit featured Danger's Big'Uns photography series.

=== Two-Spirit Sur-Thrivance and the Art of Interrupting Narratives ===
"Two-Spirit Sur-Thrivance and the Art of Interrupting Narrative" was exhibited from April 20 to June 24, 2017, at Never Apart in Montreal, Quebec. The multi-artist exhibit featured five Two-Spirit artists: Kent Monkman, Dayna Danger, Fallon Simard, Preston Buffalo and Jeffrey McNeil-Seymour. The curators were Jeffrey McNeil-Seymour and Michael Venus. The exhibit explored themes of Two-Spirit resistance, settler colonial violence and the path to reconciliation. Danger's BDSM leather beaded fetish masks and their Sisters photography series were exhibited.

=== Above the Belt, Below the Bush ===
"Above the Belt, Below the Bush" was exhibited September 27 to 29, 2019 at 123 McIntyre in North Bay, Ontario. The dual-artist exhibit featured Indigenous artists Dayna Danger and Walter Kahero:ton Scott. The curators were Michael Rondeau and Robin Alex McDonald. The exhibit explored the meanings of queer potentiality. It featured Danger's two works, To Parmeet with Love and To Myself with Love.

=== In/Visible: Body as Reflective Site ===
"In/Visible: Body as Reflective Site" was exhibited from June 26 to 29, 2019 at McClure Gallery of the Visual Arts Centre in Montreal, Quebec. The multi-artist exhibit featured Dayna Danger, Hannah Claus, Maria Ezcurra, Sandeel johal, Kama La Mackerel and Nadia Myre. The curators Lori Beavis, Maria Ezcurra and Natasha Reid explored addressing sexual violence in relation to the body through the exhibit's displayed works. It featured Danger's BDSM leather beaded fetish masks.

=== Sovereign Acts II ===
"Sovereign Acts II" was exhibited from July 21 to April 1, 2017, Concordia University's Leonard & Bina Ellen Art Gallery in Montreal, Quebec. The multi-artist exhibit featured Rebecca Belmore, Lori Blondeau, Dayna Danger, Shelley Niro, Adrian Stimson, Jeff Thomas, Robert Houle and James Luna. The themes explored settler colonialism and colonial misrepresentations of Indigenous peoples. Danger's BDSM leather beaded fetish masks were featured.

=== Seeping Upwards, Rupturing the Surface ===
"Seeping Upwards, Rupturing the Surface" was exhibited from May 3 to June 17, 2018, at the Art Gallery of Mississauga in Mississauga, Ontario. The multi-artist exhibit featured Eleni Bagaki, Maya Ben David and Tobias Williams, Maisie Cousins, Dayna Danger, Erika DeFreitas, Danièle Dennie, Lotte Meret Effinger, Doreen Garner, Talia Shipman, Molly Soda, Ambera Wellmann and Zhu Tian. The curator Kendra Ainsworth explored themes of sad girl theory, female emotions and the body through the exhibit. The exhibit featured Danger's Big'Uns photography series.

=== A Fine Pointed Belonging ===
"A Fine Pointed Belonging" was exhibited from March 8 to April 20, 2019, at Modern Fuel Artist-Run Center in Kingston, Ontario. This exhibit, curated by Gabrielle Flavelle, featured two artists, Dayna Danger and Jeneen Frei Njootli. The exhibit explored themes of "trust, embodied experience, and cultural knowledge". The exhibit also explored relationships between representation and consent through the navigation of various relationships and collaborations. In addition, the exhibit explored what representation can look like when not produced within settler colonial frameworks that reject values of consent and reciprocity. Danger's portraits were exhibited in their common large format, evoking questions of "empowerment and objectification by claiming space" in the physical space of the gallery. The display of Danger's work highlights "the intersecting dynamics of sexuality, gender, and power in a consensual and feminist manner".

== Advocacy work in Tio'tia:ke ==
Since relocating to Tio'tia:ke (Montréal), Danger has dedicated their time to supporting Indigenous communities in Tio'tia:ke through advocacy work. Danger began these endeavours through offering social services and healing programming as a frontline residential support worker at the Native Women's Shelter of Montréal. As of January 2018, Danger has been working as the Programming and Campaigns Coordinator for the Centre for Gender Advocacy.

=== The Centre for Gender Advocacy ===
The Centre for Gender Advocacy (The centre) is an organization established through by Concordia University. The centre's mission to promote equity and empowerment for peoples of all genders and social-economic backgrounds within Tio'tia:ke. The organization works in solidarity with broader social movements, other social justice organizations, and community leaders to promote gender self-determination, sovereignty of bodies, pro-agency employment, and self-love.

=== The core values of Danger's advocacy work ===
Danger's role is to oversee the organization of programming and campaigns at The centre. Danger utilizes harm reductive practices, considers accessibility and how to create safer spaces for people to gather together. Similar to their art, the core values of Danger's advocacy work include voice, visibility, existing and refusal.

=== Voice ===
With regards to voice, Danger stresses the importance of creating space and opportunities for their peers to feel safety and feel respected within their communities, and Danger especially focuses on enabling these spaces for Two-Spirit and Queer Indigenous peoples. Danger's aim of supporting Two-Spirit and Queer Indigenous peoples has inspired the creation Two-Spirit Healing Drum program at the Centre for Gender Advocacy. This activism supports the provision of space for Two-Spirit and Queer Indigenous peoples not only within a greater Tio'tia:ke context, but within Indigenous communities themselves.

=== Visibility and existing ===
Danger's visibility and existing advocacy work emphasizes how the recognition identity and body support empowerment of individuals and community. A significant amount of Danger's visibility and existing work addresses the importance of Indigenous peoples claiming space to ensure the safety and wellbeing of their communities.

=== Refusal ===
Direct action that reflects messages of refusal are essential to Danger. For Danger, refusal is about the revitalization, the protection and the accessibility ceremony. Danger understands that healing-centric advocacy work is a complicated, non-linear journey; however, Danger identifies that the necessity of their work, and this is reflected in support from their fellow community members.

=== Programming and the Missing Justice Campaign ===
Programs that Danger has facilitated while at the Centre of Gender Advocacy include solidarity healing groups and event collaborations with Concordia's First Voices Week and Winter Pride in Montreal. Danger is also a core organizer for the centre's Missing Justice Campaign. The Missing Justice Campaign is a grassroots solidarity collective whose objective is to raise awareness and provide support for Indigenous women, girls, Trans and Two-Spirit people who have faced or continue to face violence and discrimination. The campaign maintains reciprocal relationships with Indigenous communities and organizations in order to foster a safer environment for Indigenous people. The campaign continues to confront issues of systemic racism, sexisms, classism and negligence that exist within media platforms, the justice system and police forces. Missing Justice has organized various events, including MMIWGTS Vigils that were held on October 4, 2019, and February 14, 2020. Danger always centres community throughout all of their advocacy work by arguing, "[they] can't do this work without community."
