= Anique =

Anique is a given name. Notable people with the name include:

- Anique Chantal Kembazanany, Malagasy politician
- Anique Jordan, Canadian artist
- Anique Poitras, Canadian writer
- Anique Snijders, Dutch tennis player
- Anique Uddin, Danish cricketer
