= Lacie Burning =

Canadian multidisciplinary artist

Lacie Kanerahtahsóhon Burning is a Kanien'kehá:ka and Onöñda'gega multi-disciplinary artist raised on Six Nations of the Grand River in Southern Ontario, Canada. Burning is currently based out of Vancouver, British Columbia where they are completing a Bachelor of Fine Arts at Emily Carr University of Art and Design.

Their work incorporates themes of their upbringing, including their cultural and political background. Being a multi-disciplinary artist, Burning's work combines elements of photography, video, installation, and sculpture to focus on Indigenous politics and identity from a Haudenosaunee perspective. Burning has been nominated for various awards in celebration of their work such as the New Generation Photography Award and was the runner-up to the 2020 Philip B. Lind Emerging Artist Prize.

== Art practice/career ==
Lacie Burning's art is rooted in their upbringing, experiences, and identity as a Kanien'kehá:ka and Onöñda'gega Indigiqueer person. Burning's art portrays a Haudenosaunee perspective and grapples with Indigenous relationships to land, representation and “the gaze.” Burning incorporates traditional materials and fabrics, such as black velvet from traditional Mohawk regalia and practices such as beading and mask-making within their multi-media approach.

=== The Reflection Series ===
The Reflection Series is Burning’s most notable photography series exploring land-body reciprocity. The Reflection Series was inspired by Burning's witnessing of a land claims conflict (the "Caledonia Standoff") at Kanonhstaton in Six Nations of the Grand River Territory, Ontario, in 2006. Burning's experience with this conflict at age 12 spurred their political awakening and awareness of the fraught race relations between reserves and the communities that surround them. The Reflection Series ultimately explores the relationship between settlers and Indigenous peoples and what it means for Indigenous peoples to assert their presence on their traditional land. For the series, Burning asked themselves, "What do I look like—what does it look like—when I assert my sovereignty over the land as a [Kanien’kehá:ka] person in Caledonia?" The central figure in Reflection Piece, who adorns a mask of mirror shards, presents an answer to this question of assertions of sovereignty through a vulnerable lens using traditional images such as masks, and juxtaposing this with the fragility of the mirrors. Burning describes it as “the realization that unsettling our territories is a process that Indigenous peoples must take responsibility for alongside settlers by acknowledging internalized colonialism, reflecting upon it and actively wanting to change it." Praised by fellow artists The Reflection Series has been described by Cree-Métis-Saulteaux artist Lindsay Nixon as “the haunting of a genderless ghost body, a protest on the lands that taught Burning resistance, and a disruption of the supposedly clear idea of what it means to be an Indigenous person assuredly enacting sovereignty over their lands.”

== Exhibits ==
Burning's art has been featured in a variety of exhibits across Canada. In 2016, Burning was invited to feature their work at the Mohawk Institute for the Mush Hole Project. The Mohawk Institute is a former residential school, that members of Burning's family attended. For the Mush Hole Project, Burning displayed two of their works: Story Time and Who Will Be my Witness. explores intergenerational trauma and themes of resurgence and resistance in Indigenous cultures in the face of genocidal acts such as residential schools. The installation features an audio recording of residential school survivor Irene Favel speaking about her experience in a Saskatchewan school. Story Time was originally displayed in NE:ETH: Going Out of the Darkness in 2013 in conjunction with the Truth and Reconciliation Commission, where it received acclaim in Canadian Art Magazine. Who Will Be my Witness is a performance and installation piece intended to promote healing within survivors and their descendants through audience engagement. The piece encourages spectators to write on the wall of the residential school and "show positivity" towards those impacted by the residential school system and its legacy. In 2018, Burning's work was a featured exhibition in the CONTACT Photography Festival. Their exhibit Forward Facing explores the intersections within Indigenous identities through photo, video, craft, and installation practices. Forward Facing was created in collaboration with fellow artists Dayna Danger and Jade Nasogaluak Carpenter.

== Curatorial ==
Lacie Burning has also engaged in curatorial work. They collaborated with scholar June Scudeler on the exhibition "Unsettling Colonial Gender Boundaries" for the 2017 Queer Arts Festival. This exhibition explores Indigenous experiences of gender and sexuality and brings intersectional Queer-Indigenous experiences and Two-Spirit media art to the forefront. Burning and Scudeler commissioned media works and performances from artists Thirza Cuthand (Cree), Chandra Melting Tallow (Siksika), Raven Davis (Anishinaabek), and Kent Monkman (Swampy Cree) for the exhibition.

== Awards and recognitions ==
Burning's work has been praised by the art community through various awards celebrating its unique themes and multi-disciplinary approach. Burning was the runner-up in the 2020 Philip B. Lind Emerging Artist Prize and was awarded $1000 as a recognition of their achievement. The Lind Prize is an annual award given to an emerging artist based in British Columbia working in mediums of film, photography, or video. Burning was also long-listed for the New Generation Photography Award in 2020. The New Generation Photography Award, established in 2017 as a partnership between the National Gallery of Canada and Scotiabank, is annually given to three artists under 30 working in lens-based art. As of April 2020, the 2020 winners have yet to be announced.
