= Brenda Draney =

Cree artist

- Born: 1976 (age 49–50); Edmonton, Alberta
- Citizenship: Sawridge First Nation and Canada
- Education: Emily Carr University of Art and Design; University of Alberta; Grant MacEwan Community College
- Awards: National Winner; 2009 Aim is Important – RBC Canadian Painting Competition
- Website: brendadraney.com

Brenda Draney (born 1976) is a contemporary Cree artist based in Edmonton, Alberta.

== Personal and professional life ==
Draney was born in Edmonton and raised in Slave Lake, Alberta. Draney is a Cree, from Sawridge First Nation. She graduated from the University of Alberta in 2000 with a Bachelor of Fine Arts in English Literature. In 2004, she completed a Fine Arts Diploma from Grant MacEwan Community College, Alberta. She obtained a second Bachelor of Fine Arts from the University of Alberta in 2006 and a Master of Fine Arts from Emily Carr University of Art and Design in 2010. Draney has participated in several residencies at the Banff Centre for Arts and Creativity, including: What Colour is the Present? led by Duane Linklater (2013); Trading Post led by Candice Hopkins (2012); Towards Language led by Greg Staats (2010); and North led by Sharon Shorty (2007).

In 2017 Draney was awarded a commission for a permanent public art project for the main atrium of the Macewan University Centre for the Arts and Culture. In 2019 a number of her pieces were acquired through the Landmark: A New Chapter Acquisition Project by the Art Gallery of Alberta as a part of the Canada Council for the Arts “New Chapter” grant. Her paintings can be found in major private and public collections in Canada including, Alberta Foundation for the Arts, Art Gallery of Alberta, RBC collection, Walter Philips Gallery, and National Gallery of Canada.

== Style and works ==
Brenda Draney uses stories, memories and family conversations to make subtle, powerful paintings. Many of these memories are pulled from her childhood, and most centre around Slave Lake, the small town in Northern Alberta where she grew up. What emerges from the canvas are cloud-like pictures, isolated moments and constellations of ambiguous but connected associations.

In addition to the strong colours, what is most remarkable about Draney’s work is the expanse of raw or empty canvas. These blank spaces reflect her (and our) inability to recall everything. Draney subjects her own memory to the test, painting only what she can remember: fleeting flashes of actions and events, glimmers of people and moments. Draney offers the following explanation for this way of working:

It's about the uncertainty of memory, when you remember something one time and then you remember it another time and other parts get informed and replaced and changed. I also think it's about things we're not supposed to talk about, or things that aren't my business to talk about--about a story I may not have the authority to tell. Those are things that may not necessarily be available to the viewer but that are part of my process. Part of my hesitation in answering questions about my paintings is because I think a lot about how much I should disclose about the specifics of narrative. It feels a little heavy-handed or dramatic to say this, but I’m trying to cultivate desire. If I confirm it for you, you can put it to bed. And if I tell you you’re wrong, then I’ve pushed you out and said you don’t understand it, you’re not invited in.

While many of her subjects seem banal, they allude to a broader and stronger undercurrent of destruction and loss: the devastating 1988 flood and 2011 fire of Slave Lake, and the effects of the Indian Act, residential schools, band membership, and Bill C-31 on Draney’s life and work. The image of a tent features in many of her paintings. It is a reference to both the temporary housing that the community of Slave Lake endured following the area’s recent natural disasters, and to the contemporary political movements to occupy space, such as Idle No More, Chief Theresa Spence’s encampment in Ottawa, and Edmonton's tent city, to name just a few.

== Awards ==
In 2009 Draney was announced as the first-place winner of the 11th Annual Royal Bank of Canada's (RBC) Canadian Painting Competition for her painting titled Aim is Important, a sparse compelling painting. For her first-place finish, Draney received $25 000 and her piece was added to RBC's private art collection. Honourable Mention's included Martin Golland and Sasha Pierce both from Toronto.

In 2013 Draney was on the longlist for the Sobey Art Award, and in 2016 was the finalist representing Prairies and the North As one five regional finalists, her work was presented in an exhibition at National Gallery of Canada, and was featured on CBC radio's IDEAS episode with producer Mary Lynk.

In 2014 she won the Eldon and Anne Foote Visual Arts Prize, worth $10,000 for her painting Suspend.

== Major exhibitions ==
- Landmark: A New Chapter Acquisition Project, Art Gallery of Alberta, (April 28 – Nov. 11 2019)
- Sobey Art Award, National Gallery of Canada, Ottawa, (2016/2017)
- Future Station: The 2015 Alberta Biennial of Contemporary Art, curated by Kristy Trinier, Art Gallery of Alberta, Edmonton (2015)
- 90X90: Celebrating Art in Alberta, Art Gallery of Alberta, Edmonton (2014)
- Suspend, RBC New Works Gallery, Art Gallery of Alberta, Edmonton, Alberta (2013)
- Fiction/Non-Fiction, curated by Wayne Baerwaldt and Naomi Potter, Esker Foundation, Calgary, Alberta (2013)
- Incubator Series, Latitude 53, Edmonton, Alberta (2013)
- They Made a Day be a Day Here, curated by Amy Fung, Art Gallery of Grande Prairie (2013) Mendel Art Gallery (2014) School of Art Gallery (2014)
- Not Forgetting, curated by Patrick Macaulay and Lisa Myers, Harbourfront Centre, Toronto, Ontario (2012)
- Fire Destroyer Creator, with Jewel Shaw, curated by Angela Marie Schenstead, Stride Gallery, Calgary, Alberta (2012)
- Go Figure, MKG127, Toronto, Ontario (2011)
- Brenda Draney: Hold Still, Latitude 53, Edmonton, Alberta (2010)
- RBC Canadian Painting Competition, The Power Plant, Toronto, Ontario (2009)
- RBC Canadian Painting Competition, Musée d’art contemporain de Montréal, Quebec (2009)
