= Richelle Bear Hat =

Canadian Indigenous artist

- Born: Calgary, Alberta, Canada
- Education: Alberta College of Art and Design, 2011

Richelle Bear Hat is a Blackfoot and Cree artist, based in Calgary, Alberta, Canada, on Treaty 7 territory. Bear Hat's work explores the ancestral transmission of knowledge, memory, and Indigenous relationships to land. According to curator Kristy Trinier, "her practice investigates ideas surrounding family relationships and the types of knowledge that are capable of being passed through them. These ideas are explored through the use of photography, transfers, video and paper based works. It is important to use materials and means of production that support the transference of memory and provide a platform for storytelling."

== Biography ==
Richelle Bear Hat is from the Treaty 7 territory. She is a Blackfoot and Cree artist born and raised in Calgary, Alberta, Canada. Her mother was from the Siksika First Nation, and her father is from the Blueberry First Nation in Northern British Columbia, near Fort St. John. Richelle Bear Hat collaborates frequently with her sister Brittney Bear Hat.

== Early life and education ==
Bear Hat was born in Calgary, Alberta. She holds a BFA in Drawing.

== Major exhibitions ==
- In shadows of the individual, Walter Phillips Gallery, Banff Centre, Banff, AB. 2018
- Horse Camp, in collaboration with Brittney Bear Hat, curated by Ociciwan Contemporary Art Collective, AKA Artist Run Centre, Saskatoon, 2017
- Maps and Dreams, in collaboration with Brittney Bear Hat, curated by Brian Jungen and Melanie O'Brian. Audain Gallery / SFU Galleries. Vancouver, BC. 2017.
- Little Cree Women (Sisters, Secrets and Stories), in collaboration with Brittney Bear Hat, Art Gallery of Alberta, Edmonton, AB. 2016.

== Education ==
Richelle Bear Hat studied Painting at the Alberta College of Art and Design. She received her BFA in 2011.
