= Jérôme Havre =

Jérôme Havre is a Toronto-based artist originally from Paris, France.

== Early life and education ==
Havre studied at École Nationale Supérieure des Beaux-Arts in Paris. He moved to Montreal before settling in Toronto, where he was the artist-in-residence at the Art Gallery of Ontario from December 7, 2015 to March 26, 2016. Havre has exhibited in the Textile Museum of Canada.

== Works ==
Havre employs a variety of media in his work, including textiles, sculpture, video and photography. These media are often combined to create immersive environments, as in the 2013 show ″Re-Marquer le Territoire / Territorial Re-Marks″ at the Front Room Gallery in Brooklyn. Havre's 2013 show at the Textile Museum of Canada, a collaboration with artist Heather Goodchild, drew controversy when the Toronto Star's review of the show contrasted the perceived restraint of Goodchild's work with the "exotic" character of Havre's work, calling the latter a "screed against colonial superiority." His immersive installation Six Degrees of Separation was featured in the 2015 exhibition "Land Marks" at the Art Gallery of Peterborough.

Havre collaborated on the 2009 exhibition Fibred Optics at the Ottawa Art Gallery with artists Frances Dorsey, Ed Pien, and Michėle Provost, and curator Andrea Fatona.

In 2017 Havre's collaborative film and video commission with Cauleen Smith and Camille Turner called Triangle Trade premiered at Gallery TPW in Toronto. This work explored Blackness as an identity, movement and an experience.

== Awards ==
Havre was long-listed for the National Gallery of Canada's Sobey Art Award in 2011.
