= Winsom =

Jamaican-Canadian artist

- Born: 1946 (age 79–80); Jamaica
- Education: Jamaica School of Art
- Known for: visual arts
- Awards: Honorary doctorate from Ontario College of Art and Design University
- Website: http://winsomwinsom.com/

Winsom (born 1946) is a Maroon Canadian multi-media artist working in textiles, painting, video, installations, and puppetry. Her work explores human spirituality.

== Biography ==
Winsom was born in 1946 in Jamaica, where she studied at the Jamaica School of Art. She immigrated to Canada in 1969. From 1974 to 1989, she lived in the city of Kingston, Ontario and she co-founded the Kingston's Black Women's Collective.

== Exhibitions ==
Winsom has been exhibiting her work since the mid-1980s at galleries around the world. Her work was featured in the group exhibition, "Black Wimmin: When and Where We Enter" (1989), organized by the Diasporic Africa Women's Art Collective (DAWA), which toured in Canada. She has held solo exhibitions at the Art Gallery of Ontario and the National Gallery of the Cayman Islands. In 2003, Winsom had four exhibitions running concurrently in several Toronto galleries.

Winsom's work was featured in the 2017 group exhibition Toronto: Tributes + Tributaries, 1971–1989 at the Art Gallery of Ontario, curated by Wanda Nanibush.

In 2018 to 2019, the Art Gallery of Ontario presented a solo show of her work, curated by Andrea Fatona, entitled "I Rise". It was in this context that Winsom partook in a performative dinner with the Black Wimmin Artists (BWA) collective called The Feast in 2019. Her installation titled "The Masks We Wear" was exhibited at the Agnes Etherington Art Centre in 2022.

== Awards and honors ==
NOW Magazine described Winsom as "the defining artist of Black History Month in Toronto".

In 2015, she was the recipient of an Honorary Doctorate from OCAD University.
