= Lana Whiskeyjack =

Cree multidisciplinary artist

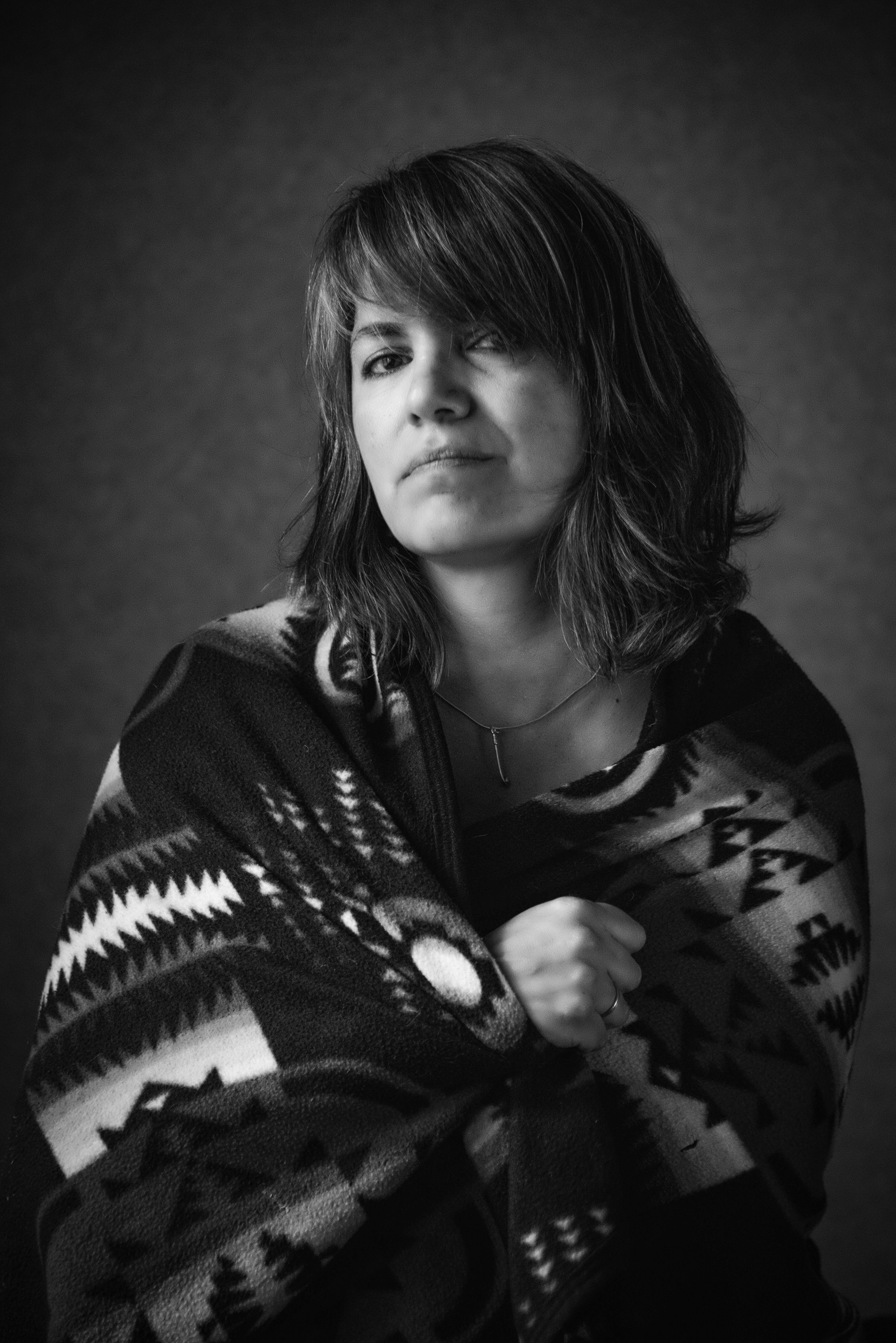
- Known for: Art activist and educator
- Website: https://lanawhiskeyjack.ca/

Lana Whiskeyjack is a multidisciplinary artist, writer and researcher known for her work exploring experiences of Cree identity in Western culture. She is featured in the documentary film Lana Gets Her Talk by Beth Wishart MacKenzie.

== Early life and education ==
Lana Whiskeyjack is a member of Saddle Lake Cree Nation in northeastern Alberta. She was raised mainly by her grandmother, who is a residential school survivor, as is Whiskeyjack's mother. In her artist statements, Whiskeyjack credits the influence of learning traditional arts from her mother and grandmother, such as quilting and singing. She began her post-secondary education studying visual arts at Red Deer College and the University of Alberta, ultimately earning bachelor's and master's degrees in arts from Carleton University in Ottawa. In 2000, she traveled to France and studied environmental sculpture at Pont Aven School of Contemporary Art. Whiskeyjack received her doctorate in 2017 from University nuhelotʼįne thaiyotsʼį nistameyimâkanak Blue Quills, a former Canadian Indian residential school attended by her mother and grandmother that is now the first educational institution in Canada to be run by Indigenous peoples.

== Artistic work ==
Whiskeyjack's work reflects on the experience of being a Cree woman in a Western world, and the "reclaiming, re-gathering, and remembering" of their ancestral power.

In 2017, during the 150th anniversary of Canada, Whiskeyjack and Beth Wishart MacKenzie received a Canada Council grant to tour the country with an installation titled pîkiskwe-speak. The installation included Whiskeyjack's multimedia project Lost My Talk and MacKenzie's 37-minute documentary film about the artistic process of creating the work. Lost My Talk is a triptych piece, and the film focuses on Whiskeyjack's work on the middle section, a mixed media sculpture of her uncle's face. The tour stopped in Edmonton, Montreal, Ottawa, Yellowknife, Winnipeg, Regina, Halifax, Toronto, and Vancouver.

Whiskeyjack has also received Canada Council funding through the {Re}conciliation Initiative in partnership with the J.W. McConnell Family Foundation.

In June 2020, a piece of Whiskeyjack's art was stolen from the Ociciwan Contemporary Art Collective's new gallery space in the Boyle Street neighbourhood of Edmonton. The artwork, a beaded medallion crafted with deer lace and rabbit fur titled Three Generations of nitêh (my heart), was at the gallery as part of Ociciwan's grand opening exhibition at their new space, which has been delayed due to COVID-19. The exhibition opened in September 2020.

== Research work ==
Whiskeyjack has been involved with decolonial community research with several institutions, including a six-year research project on First Nations sexual health with the University of Toronto and UnBQ. At UnBQ, she was also involved in research exploring the wellness and economic security of Indigenous women in several First Nations and Métis communities in Alberta.

Whiskeyjack was an assistant professor in the University of Alberta Faculty of Extension until July 2020, when she was hired full-time into the Faculty of Arts' Women and Gender Studies program. She is involved with several community-based Indigenous research projects. Her project Reconnecting to the Spirit of Language uses dialogue circles to contemplate the revitalization of Cree language. She is collaborating on a project to build out community programs for Indigenous Two Spirit youth, and continues to do research on women's health.

As a representative of University of Alberta, Whiskeyjack sits on the steering committee for RESOLVE, a University of Calgary-based network to coordinate research on violence against women and girls in Alberta, Saskatchewan and Manitoba.

== Writing ==
Whiskeyjack is the author of a children's book, Nimiywêyihtên: "I Feel Great," illustrated by her daughter, Serina Follette.
