= Raven Davis =

Ojibwe artist and activist

- Born: 1975 (age 50–51); Toronto, Ontario

Raven Davis (born 1975) is a multimedia Indigenous artist, curator, activist, and community organizer of the Anishinaabe (Ojibway) Nation in Manitoba. Davis's work centers themes of culture, colonization, sexuality, and gender and racial justice. Davis currently lives in Halifax, Nova Scotia and works between Halifax and Toronto, Ontario. Davis is also a traditional dancer, singer, and drummer.

== Career ==
In 2010, Davis joined the Friends United initiative as an artist and associate and currently sits on the advisory board.

In 2017, Raven Davis was hired as co-artistic director of Halifax's Queer Acts Theatre Festival.

=== Awards, honours, and residencies ===
- Art and Activism Resident, NSCAD University (2016)
- Cape Breton Partnership, Aboriginal Women of Distinction in Business, nomination (2010)
- Cape Breton Industry Award, Sydney Ports Authority (2009)

=== Curatorial ===
- Nocturne, Halifax, Nova Scotia (2018)
- Bonnie Devine | Circles and Lines: Michi Saagiig. Art Gallery of Mississauga. Mississauga, Ontario (2018)
- Wsitqamu | Nunak | Ktahkomiq | Land, co-curated with Aidan Gillis, PETAPAN: First Light Indigenous Arts Symposium, Dieppe, New Brunswick (2016)

=== Filmography ===
- "I Still Believe" (2015) Director and Producer.
- "Spooning" (2015) Co-Produced with Elisha Lim.
- "Love Never Felt so Good" (2014) Collaboration with Elisha Lim.

=== Selected exhibitions ===
- Friends United Art Exhibit. Halifax City Hall. (2012)
- This is My Song: Perspectives from Contemporary Native Women. Huntsville. (2012)
- Friends United. Casino Nova Scotia. Halifax, Nova Scotia. (2013)
- Indiginesse. Aurora Cultural Centre. Aurora, Ontario. (2014)
- Wagmatcook Arts & Culture festival. Wagmatcook, Nova Scotia. (2014)
- Assembly of First Nations Conference. Halifax, N.S. (2014)
- Basquiat Idea Bar: Justice. Art Gallery of Ontario. (2015)
- Map of the New Art. Cini Foundation. Venice. (2015)
- Duality. Kennedy Gallery. North Bay, Ontario. (2017)
- The De-Celebration of Canada 150. Khyber Center for the Arts. Halifax, Nova Scotia. (2017)
- níchiwamiskwém | nimidet | ma soeur | my sister. The Biennale of Contemporary Aboriginal Art (BACA). Art Mur, Montreal, Quebec. (2018)
- In Dialogue. Art Gallery of Southwestern Manitoba. Brandon, Manitoba. (2018)

== Personal ==
Raven Davis is a parent of three sons. Having a mother who is also an Anishinaabe artist has influenced Davis in their life and career. Davis was born and raised in Toronto and attended Ryerson University and George Brown College.

The artist is two-spirited and uses gender-neutral pronouns. Davis speaks at schools, art venues, and community events, raising awareness around issues of gender, sexuality, and race.

== See also ==
- Visual arts by indigenous peoples of the Americas
