= Pamela Edmonds =

Canadian visual and media arts curator

- Born: Montreal, Quebec, Canada

Academic background
- Education: Art History
- Alma mater: Concordia University (BFA & MA)
- Thesis: The politics of belonging: Positioning black identity in contemporary African-Canadian Art (2007)

Academic work
- Institutions: McMaster Museum of Art, McMaster University
- Website: www.pe-curates.space

Pamela Edmonds is a Canadian visual and media arts curator focused on themes of decolonization and the politics of representation. She is considered an influential figure in the Black Canadian arts scene. Since 2022, Edmonds has been the Director and Curator of the Dalhousie Art Gallery in Halifax, Nova Scotia.

== Career ==
Pamela Edmonds is a visual and media arts curator concerned with the politics of representation and influential in the Black Canadian arts scene. She is the former Senior Curator of the McMaster Museum of Art, in Hamilton, Ontario. Originally from Montreal, Quebec, she earned both her BFA and MA in Art History from Concordia University.

Edmonds began her career in Halifax in 1998 with the exhibition Skin: A Political Boundary, co-curated with Meril Rasmussen at Nova Scotia College of Art and Design. Since, Edmonds has remained a key player in the Black Canadian art scene. In 2019, she joined forces with other prominent Black Canadian curators Julie Crooks, Associate Curator of Photography at the Art Gallery of Ontario, Montreal based independent curator Dominique Fontaine and Gaëtane Verna, then Director of The Power Plant Contemporary Art Gallery to organize the inaugural Black Curators Forum. After working many years in Toronto, Ontario at the Thames Art Gallery of the Chatham Cultural Centre, Edmonds was promoted to senior curator at McMaster Museum of Art, becoming one of the few Black curators working in senior curatorial positions in Canadian museums and galleries.

Her collaborative curatorial work has yielded some of the most important exhibitions of Black Canadian art in the 2000s. Working with the Sister Visions collective Edmonds organized Through Our Eyes at the Art Gallery of Nova Scotia in Halifax. She subsequently worked at A Space Gallery in Toronto, Ontario where she was the exhibitions coordinator, and in the Art Gallery of Peterborough where she became the curator/director. In 2009, Edmonds co-founded Third Space Art Projects, a curatorial collective which she co-directs with Sally Frater.

In 2014, Edmonds served as mentor in the Ontario Association of Art Galleries (OAAG). Her work continues to focus on decolonialism and Black Canadian art practices.

== Curated exhibitions ==
New-Found-Lands, Eastern Edge Gallery, St. John's, 2016

Liminal: Lucie Chan & Jerome Havre Robert McLaughlin Gallery, Oshawa, Ontario, 2016

Skin Deep: Reimaging the Portrait, Project Gallery, Toronto, 2015

Confluence: Shifting Perspectives of the Caribbean, Artist in Transit, 2014

Tracings: Recent Work by the W5Art Collective, Women's Arts Resource Centre Gallery, Toronto, 2014

Bounty: Chikonzero Chazunguza, Gallery 101, Ottawa 2013

Erika DeFreitas: Deaths/Births/Memorials, Centre 3 for Print and Media Arts, Hamilton, 2013

Screening Alterity, Art Gallery of Peterborough, 2012

28 Days: Reimagining Black History Month, Justina M. Barnicke Gallery/Georgia Scherman Projects, Toronto, 2012

== Publications ==
Throughout her career, Edmonds has published texts about Black Canadian art histories. She has also served as editor for cultural publications, including MICE Magazine (Moving Image Culture Etc.) with Mark V. Campbell, and the Black cultural journal Kola (based in Montreal).
