= Brittney Bear Hat =

First Nations artist

- Born: Calgary, Alberta, Canada, on Treaty 7 land
- Education: Alberta College of Art and Design, 2011

Brittney Bear Hat is a half Blackfoot, half Cree artist. She makes work in a variety of media, including photography, installation and video, as a means to explore how memory and personal identity construct her Native identity.

== Biography ==
Brittney Bear Hat is from the Treaty 7 territory. She is a half Blackfoot, half Cree artist born and raised in Calgary, Alberta, Canada. Her mother was from the Siksika First Nation, and her father is from the Blueberry First Nation in Northern British Columbia, near Fort St. John. Brittney Bear Hat frequently collaborates with her sister Richelle Bear Hat.

Based in Calgary, her work focuses on identity and belonging. As described by curator Kristy Trinier, her work "involves the process of taking her own family photos or personal items and combining them with text, retelling stories and memories" related to her Native heritage.

== Major exhibitions ==
- In the Shadows of the individual, curated by Yasmin Nurming-Por, Walter Phillips Gallery, The Banff Centre, Banff AB, 2017.
- Horse Camp, in collaboration with Richelle Bear Hat, curated by Ociciwan Contemporary Art Collective, AKA Artist Run Centre, Saskatoon, 2017.
- Future Station: 2015 Alberta Biennial of Contemporary Art, curated by Kristy Trinier. Art Gallery of Alberta. Edmonton, AB. 2015.

== Education ==
In 2011, Brittney Bear Hat graduated with a BFA in Painting from the Alberta College of Art and Design.
