= Anique Chantal Kembazanany =

Malagasy politician

Anique Chantal Kembazanany is a Malagasy politician. A member of the National Assembly of Madagascar in the 2007 Malagasy parliamentary elections. She was elected as a member of the Tiako I Madagasikara party; she represents the constituency of Farafangana.
