= Cyndra MacDowall =

Canadian photographer

- Born: April 20, 1953 (age 73); Toronto, Ontario
- Education: BAE at Queens University and MFA at Concordia University
- Notable work: Eclipse (1991) was purchased by the National Gallery of Canada for the Canadian Photography Institutes' collection.
- Website: http://cyndramacdowall.com

Cyndra MacDowall (born April 20, 1953) is a Canadian visual artist known for her photography and writing.

== Biography ==
Cyndra MacDowall was born on April 20, 1953, in Toronto, Ontario. She has lived and worked in Toronto, Montreal, and currently Windsor, Ontario. She maintains studios in Toronto and Windsor, Ontario. Her work has been exhibited since 1987.

== Career ==
MacDowall received a Bachelor of Art Education from Queen's University in 1977 and a Master of Fine Arts in Photography from Concordia University in 1995. She was a photography professor at the University of Windsor's School of Creative Arts (SoCA). Her work is included in various public and private collections, including the Art Gallery of Windsor and the Ryerson Image Centre.

=== Style, technique, and reception ===
MacDowall's work focuses on questions related to relationships of space (architectural and/or geographical), history, memory, gender, and identity. Her work often combines sculptural forms with photography.

=== Significant works ===
- Eclipse (1991) was acquired by the National Gallery of Canada for the Canadian Museum of Contemporary Photography's collection.
