= Camille Turner =

Canadian artist

- Born: 11 March 1960 (age 66); Kingston, Jamaica
- Education: York University; OCAD University; McMaster University; Sheridan College
- Known for: Performance artist, video artist, new media artist, interactive artist, installation artist, sonic artist
- Notable work: Miss Canadiana: Red, White, and Beautiful Tour (2002–present); The Final Frontier (2007); TimeWarp (2014); The Afronautic Research Lab (2016)
- Movement: Afrofuturism, feminism, Black Canadians, new media art
- Awards: Chalmers Arts Fellowship, Ontario Arts Council (2013), Ontario Graduate Scholarship (2016), Paavo and Aino Lukhari Fellowship, CERLAC York University (2016)
- Website: camilleturner.com

Camille Turner (born 11 March 1960) is a Black Canadian media and performance artist, curator, and educator. She has exhibited nationally and internationally, particularly concerning the subject of Black Canadian Identity.

== Early life ==
Born in Kingston, Jamaica, Turner immigrated to Canada when she was nine, first to Sarnia, and then Hamilton, Ontario. Her childhood experience of living in Canada was marked by a feeling of otherness; other children's racial taunts created a sense that she didn't belong. Turner has said, "no matter how long I live in Canada, no matter that I've lived here most of my life, when will I ever be Canadian? The feeling of otherness is so common." Simultaneously, Canada was the place where she and her mother and sister became reunited with her father, a boilermaker who made his living working in Hamilton's steel industry. Turner notes, "for me, my father was always somewhere else. And so home was always this mythical place that was going to happen when he would get settled. Then he would send for us, and we would be a family together. That's why a lot of the work that I do is about belonging and home, because it has always been this thing that was out there."

== Education ==
Turner is a graduate of the Ontario College of Art, and has also attended McMaster University and Sheridan College. She earned a Master of Environmental Studies and a doctorate in Environmental Studies at York University.

== Artistic career ==
Turner's work investigates diasporic identity and intercultural exchange through interventions, installations, performances, media works, and public engagements, and her most recent work investigates hidden or erased histories through place-based exploration. She is best known for her glamorous alter-ego Miss Canadiana, a hometown beauty queen on an ambassadorial Red, White, and Beautiful Tour, who has been calling out contradictions since 2002 of the Canadian mythology of multiculturalism across the globe.

Frequently employing new media art and mobile technologies in her interactive performance projects, several of Turner's projects imagine black futures through afrofuturistic narratives. A series of performances—The Final Frontier (2010), TimeWarp (2013), and The Afronautic Research Lab (2016)—proposes the return of a group of space travelers, the Afronauts, descendants of the Dogon people of West Africa who have come home after 10,000 years to save the planet. Using the detailed iconography of [science fiction|Science fiction], Turner investigates the mythic Canadian landscape. Not letting Canadians sit comfortably with the self-satisfied narrative that their country was often at the end of the Underground Railroad, The Afronauts most recently confronted the country's amnesia around its own histories of slavery by inviting visitors to pore over ads posted in 18th-century newspapers by Canadian slave owners. Through these performances, Turner builds on stories of the Dogon's extensive astronomical knowledge dating back to 3200 BC - in regards to this research and creation, Turner has said "You know, to cavort with the ghosts is what I think about, because these things haunt the present, and sci-fi is a great language for connecting with the ghosts."

Turner was Artist-in-Residence at the Art Gallery of Mississauga, 2012–2014. In 2013–2014, she held a residency through the Neighbourhood Spaces Program of the Broken City Lab artist-run centre in Windsor, Ontario. In the summer of 2015, her interactive project "Big Up Barton" focused on a neglected neighbourhood in Hamilton, Ontario. Mounted in a neglected store front on Barton Street, the work presented recorded audio narratives of local residents' memories and invited visitors to share written responses. Turner's project Wanted, a collaboration with Camal Pirbhai, took the form of contemporary photo portraits paired with notices of runaway slaves from eighteenth-century Canada. During the summer of 2017, elements of the work were installed as billboards in prominent locations in Toronto.

Turner's three channel video installation, Nave, which focused on Canada's past involvement in the trans-Atlantic slave trade was awarded the $10,000.00 Artist Prize at the Toronto Biennial of Art in 2022.
