= Ayqa Khan =

Pakistani-American artist

- Born: May 14, 1995 (age 31); United States, New York, New York City
- Education: Cooper Union
- Known for: photography, illustration
- Website: www.ayqakhan.com

Ayqa Khan is a Pakistani-American photographer and digital illustrator. She is known for work that depicts South Asian women openly displaying body hair.

== Biography ==
Khan is a first-generation Pakistani-American who was born and raised in New York City. She identifies as Muslim. Raised in a predominantly white area, Khan felt pressure to fit in with her peers and described herself in a 2018 interview with Allure as "somebody who had to prepare two hours to wake up early to make sure I had no hair on my face." She continued removing unwanted hair until college. Between 2016 and 2017 she stopped removing any body hair at all and struggled with the reactions of the general public and her family. After beginning to reject societal expectations about body hair for herself, she began painting artwork featuring women with facial and body hair.

As of 2020, Khan is a student at Cooper Union, and was selected to participate in a study abroad program at Central Saint Martins.

== Career ==
Khan's work features traditional South Asian motifs and symbols of American youth culture and focuses on brown women with visible body hair they have decided not to remove. The women are often seen in casual, personal or social settings because, as she explained in a 2016 interview, "body hair is a natural thing and so it makes sense for me to want to project it into my drawings of people." Lia McGarrigle argued that the appeal of Khan's work is tied to how it challenges the inherent shame of traditional beauty standards toward body hair.

Khan uses Tumblr and Instagram to connect and engage with her audience. In a 2016 profile, WNYC's Studio 360 explained her online presence has been well received by young women who identify with the imagery she creates and who have, in turn, confided their own stories of navigating two cultural experiences. Creators echoed that sentiment explaining that she has created spaces for people to discuss and share their own relationships and experiences with body hair.

In 2017 Khan contributed art for one of a series of Mother's Day greeting cards created by the California nonprofit Forward Together that aimed to promote awareness about different types of motherhood. Her piece depicted a mother on a Pakistani rug next to a saucer of tea, embracing her gender ambiguous child.

Khan is the founder of SouthAsia.Art, an online collective that promotes the work of South Asian artists.

== Exhibitions ==
=== Solo ===
- 2016 - SUBMERGING - Cooper Union, Manhattan, New York
- 2016 - Take Me Home Tonight - Alt Space, Brooklyn, New York

=== Group ===
- 2018 - The Third Muslim - SOMArts, San Francisco, California
