= Alberta Biennial of Contemporary Art =

Art exhibition in Alberta, Canada

The Alberta Biennial of Contemporary Art is a contemporary art exhibition which has been held at various locations in Alberta, Canada, every two years from 1996 to 2012, then on a two or three year basis since then. Its purpose is "to foster a dialogue between artists and communities across the province."

Two artists withdrew from the planned show in 2020 due to the complete exclusion of Black artists throughout the biennial's history.

== History ==
- 1996
- 1998
- 2000 by Edmonton Art Gallery curator Catherine Crowston and Banff’s Allan Harding Mackay
- 2002
- 2004
- 2006
- 2007 - "Living Utopia and Disaster" Curated by Catherine Crowston and Sylvie Gilbert
- 2010 - “Timeland” guest curator Richard Rhodes
- 2013 - "The News From Here" guest curated by award-winning critic and independent curator Nancy Tousley
- 2015 - "Future Station" curated by Kristy Trinier
- 2017 - "for the time being:" Curated by Peta Rake and Kristy Trinier
