= Ludovic Booz =

Haitian painter and sculptor

Ludovic Booz (16 June 1940 – 2 February 2015) was a Haitian painter and sculptor. Born in Aquin, Booz sculpted bronze busts of several Haitian presidents. His work has been exhibited in France, Israel, and Suriname.

Grand Mother

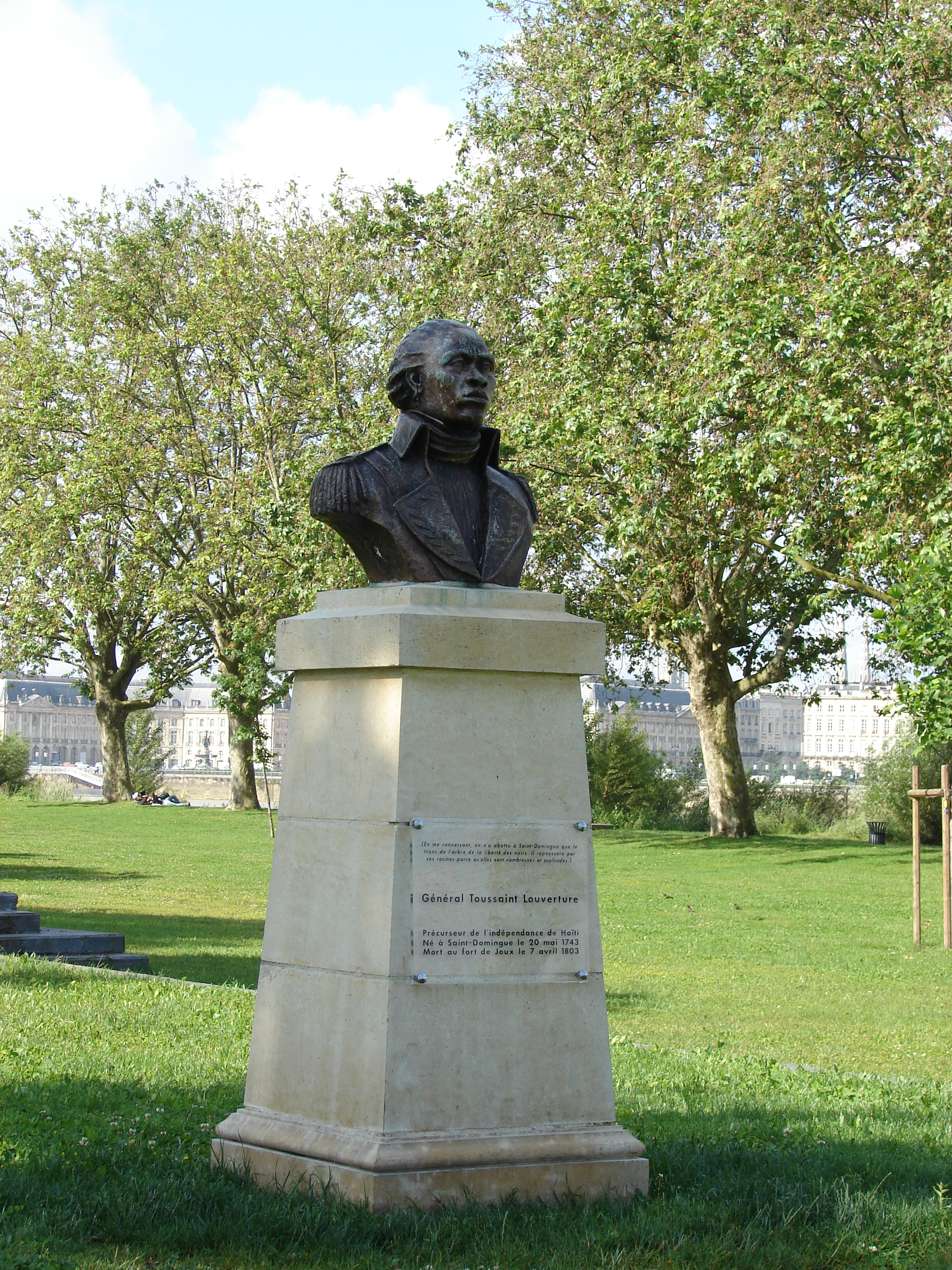
Bronze bust of Toussaint Louverture, Bordeaux.
