= Richmond Art Gallery =

- Established: 1980; 46 years ago
- Location: 180-7700 Minoru Gate, Richmond, British Columbia, Canada V6Y 1R9
- Coordinates: 49.164144°N 123.140929°W
- Type: Art museum
- Director: Shaun Dacey
- Chairperson: Allison Liu
- Curator: Zoë Chan
- Website: www.richmondartgallery.org

The Richmond Art Gallery (abbreviated as RAG) is a non-profit contemporary art museum located in Richmond, British Columbia, Canada. Established in 1980, the gallery is situated within the Richmond Cultural Centre at Minoru Park and serves as a primary hub for visual arts in the city of Richmond.

== History and governance ==
The gallery was founded in 1980 to support and showcase Canadian, Indigenous, and international contemporary artists. It is operated through a partnership between the City of Richmond and the Richmond Art Gallery Association (RAGA), an independent, non-profit society formed to manage the gallery's educational programming, outreach events, and fundraising efforts.

Financial operations are sustained through municipal funding alongside support from the British Columbia Arts Council, the Province of British Columbia, and the Canada Council for the Arts.

== Collection and Exhibitions ==
The gallery curates a rotating schedule of contemporary exhibitions that address cultural issues and narratives unique to Richmond, frequently drawing parallels to global socio-cultural themes.

=== Permanent Collection ===
RAG maintains a permanent collection consisting of over 300 works of art, primarily acquired between the early 1980s and 2000. Their focus is on works about the City of Richmond by artists primarily from the Lower Mainland. The collection highlights diverse mediums by notable West Coast and Canadian artists, including:

- Susan Point
- Bill Reid
- Greg Girard
- Toni Onley
- Anna Wong

=== Representation of the Chinese-Canadian Community ===
Reflecting the high demographic concentration of Chinese-Canadians in Richmond, the gallery frequently commissions and exhibits contemporary works exploring the intersection of Chinese cultural heritage and local history. These initiatives include solo exhibitions, collaborative regional history projects, and public art installations that document shifts in the local urban landscape.

Notable exhibitions focusing on these themes include:

- Hong Wo 同和 (Marlene Yuen): A collaborative archival exhibition detailing the history of the 19th-century immigrant-owned Hong Wo general store in Steveston, a vital social hub for early Chinese cannery workers.
- Empty Spaces that Fill My Heart (Chad Wong): A project documenting the fading cultural iconography, restaurants, and shopping centres built by Hong Kong and Mainland Chinese immigrants in Richmond since the 1990s.
- The Roaming Peach Blossom Spring (Qiu Anxiong and Howie Tsui): A two-person exhibition blending traditional Chinese ink painting aesthetics with contemporary themes of migration, industrialization, and urban development.

=== Off-site Programming ===
In addition to its main exhibition space inside the Richmond Cultural Centre, the gallery programs The Annex Gallery, an offsite outreach space located inside the Richmond Cultural Centre Annex. This space is dedicated exclusively to featuring work by artists based in Richmond.

The art gallery also curates pieces for the Richmond City Hall galleria and photo-based installations on and around Canada Line stations throughout the city.

== Programs and Accessibility ==
RAG hosts multilingual guided tours in English, French, Cantonese, and Mandarin to reflect the demographic diversity of Richmond. The gallery also facilitates artist talks, workshops, youth mentorship programs, and panel discussions throughout the year.
