= Charmaine Nelson =

Canadian art historian

- Born: Charmaine Andrea Nelson; 1971 (age 54–55)
- Occupation: Art history professor
- Years active: 2001–present

Academic background
- Education: Concordia University (BFA, MFA); University of Manchester (PhD)

Academic work
- Discipline: Art History
- Institutions: University of Massachusetts Amherst (2022–present); NSCAD University (2020–2022); McGill University (2003–2020); University of Western Ontario
- Main interests: Visual culture of slavery, race and representation; Black Canadian studies; African Canadian history; Black Feminist scholarship; Transatlantic Slavery Studies; Black Diaspora Studies

Charmaine Andrea Nelson (born 1971) is a Canadian art historian, educator, author, and independent curator. Nelson was a full professor of art history at McGill University until June 2020 when she joined NSCAD University to develop the Institute for the Study of Canadian Slavery. She is the first tenured Black professor of art history in Canada. Nelson's research interests include the visual culture of slavery, race and representation, Black Canadian studies and African Canadian history as well as critical theory, post-colonial studies, Black feminist scholarship, Transatlantic Slavery Studies, and Black Diaspora Studies. In addition to teaching and publishing in these research areas, Nelson has curated exhibitions, including at the Robert McLaughlin Gallery in Oshawa, Ontario, and the Leonard and Bina Ellen Art Gallery at Concordia University in Montreal, Quebec.

== Education ==
- BFA Art History 1994, Concordia University
- MFA Art History 1995, Concordia University
- PhD Art History 2001, the University of Manchester (UK)

== Career ==
After completing her BFA and MFA degrees at Concordia University, Nelson worked at the Canadian War Museum in Ottawa, Ontario. She then began her PhD at Queen's University which she completed at the University of Manchester (UK) in 2001. Before obtaining her position at McGill University, Nelson was an assistant professor at University of Western Ontario.

Throughout her career, Nelson has held several fellowships and research chairs including a Caird Senior Research Fellowship, National Maritime Museum, Greenwich, UK (2007), a Fulbright Visiting Research Chair, University of California – Santa Barbara (2010) as well as a visiting professorship in the Department of Africology at the University of Wisconsin, Milwaukee (2011).

In 2015, she was an Associate Member of the Gail and Stephen A. Jarislowsky Institute for Studies in Canadian Art at Concordia University. From 2015 to 2017, Nelson was a Faculty Fellow at McGill's Institute for Public Life of the Arts and Ideas. In 2016, she was named as a Fellow of the Royal Society of Canada, College of New Scholars, Artists, and Scientists. From 2017 to 2018, Nelson was the William Lyon Mackenzie King Visiting Professor of Canadian Studies at Harvard University.

In June 2020, Nelson was named as NSCAD University's Tier 1 Canada Research Chair, a funded, seven-year (renewable) position where she will continue her research on Transatlantic Black Diasporic Art and Community Engagement. In addition, Nelson will use the seven-year position to work with NSCAD to develop the Institute for the Study of Canadian Slavery.

As of October, 2022, Nelson has left NSCAD, citing experiences of racism where she felt "undermined and as though she was being questioned about her ability to run an institute." She has re-developed the Institute for the Study of Canadian Slavery into the Slavery North Initiative, a project that she currently leads at the University of Massachusetts Amherst.

== Public speaking ==
Nelson regularly offers public presentations of her research. Some of these include:

- McCready Lecture on Canadian Art at the Art Gallery of Ontario, "From African to Creole: Examining Creolization through the Art and Fugitive Slave Advertisements of Eighteenth- and Nineteenth-Century Canada and Jamaica" (2016).
- Walker Cultural Leader Series and Canada 150 at Brock University, "Colonial Print Culture and the Limits of Enslaved Resistance: Examining the Late Eighteenth and Early Nineteenth-Century Fugitive Slave Archive in Canada and Jamaica" (2017).
- Slavery and human rights: struggles of representation Lectures presented by Réseau art actuel, "Mining a Colonial Archive: Fugitive Slave Advertisements – An Untapped Resource in the Study of Slavery in Canada" (2017).
- Lecture at University of Toronto Scarborough, "Slavery, Race & Representation: Charmaine A. Nelson and Andrew Hunter in Conversation" wherein Nelson discussed her "research on fugitive slaves in Canada and its role in understanding the experiences of Black communities in 18th and 19th centuries in the regions that became Canada" (April 2018).
- Lecture at the National Gallery of Canada, "Fugitive Slave Advertisements and/as Portraiture in late Eighteenth- and early Nineteenth-Century Canada" (February 2019).
- ECI Mandela Lecture at Ryerson University, "True North: Unmasking Slavery in Canada Ft. Dr. Charmaine Nelson" (October 2019).
- J. Fred Weintz & Rosemary Weintz Art Lecture Series at Stanford University's Department of Art & Art History, "Weintz Art Lecture Series presents Charmaine Nelson" (November 2019).
- Guest lecture at Concordia University with the Concordia Undergraduate Journal of Art History's Black History Month Speaker Series, "Introduction to Canadian Slavery" (February 2024).

== Select publications ==
Nelson has published articles in academic journals and popular sources, including the Journal of Transatlantic Studies, The Walrus Magazine, Frieze, RACAR: Revue d'art canadienne / Canadian Art Review, American Art, Topia: Canadian Journal of Cultural Studies, and HuffPost. She is author and editor of several books and has contributed chapters to numerous scholarly publications.

=== As author ===
- Through an-other's eyes: white Canadian artists, Black female subjects (Oshawa, Ontario: Robert McLaughlin Gallery, 1998). ISBN 0921500238
- The Color of Stone: Sculpting the Black Female Subject in Nineteenth-Century America (Minneapolis: University of Minnesota Press, 2007). ISBN 9780816646500
- Representing the Black Female Subject in Western Art (New York: Routledge, 2010). ISBN 9780415871167
- Slavery, Geography, and Empire in Nineteenth-Century Marine Landscapes of Montreal and Jamaica (London, UK: Routledge/Taylor and Francis, 2016). ISBN 9781409468912

=== As editor ===
- Racism Eh?: A Critical Inter-Disciplinary Anthology of Race and Racism in Canada (Concord, Ontario: Captus Press, 2004). ISBN 9781553220619
- Ebony Roots, Northern Soil: Perspectives on Blackness in Canada (Newcastle upon Tyne, UK: Cambridge Scholars Press, 2010). ISBN 9781443825641
- Legacies Denied: Unearthing the Visual Culture of Canadian Slavery (Montreal: Printed for author by McGill Copy Service, 2013).
- Towards an African-Canadian Art History: Art, Memory, and Resistance (Concord, Ontario: Captus Press, 2018). ISBN 9781553223658

=== As contributing author ===
- "Vénus africaine: race, beauty and African-ness," [chapter] Black Victorians: black people in British art, 1800–1900, ed. Jan Marsh (Aldershot, Hampshire; Burlington, VT: Lund Humphries, 2005). ISBN 9780853319306
- "Edmonia Lewis's Death of Cleopatra: White Marble, Black Bodies, and Racial Crisis in America," Local/Global: Women Artists in the Nineteenth-Century, eds. Deborah Cherry and Janice Helland (Aldershot, UK: Ashgate Publishing Limited, 2006). ISBN 9780754631972
- "Speculations on the Visual: Culture, Race and Diaspora," [chapter] Multiple Lenses: Voices from the Diaspora Located in Canada, ed. David Divine (Newcastle-upon-Tyne: Cambridge Scholars Publishing, 2007). ISBN 9781847181107
- "Sugar Cane, Slaves, and Ships: Colonialism, Geography and Power in Nineteenth-Century Landscapes of Montreal and Jamaica," [chapter] Living History: Encountering the Memory of the Heirs of Slavery, ed. Ana Lucia Araujo (New Castle upon Tyne, UK: Cambridge Scholars Publishers, 2009). ISBN 9781443809986
- "Buried in a Watery Grave: Art, Commemoration and Racial Trauma," [chapter] The Black Body: Imagining, Writing, and (Re)reading, eds. Michelle Goodwin, Sandra Jackson, Fassil Demisse (University of South Africa Press, 2009). ISBN 9781868884780
- "Blacks in White Marble: Interracial Female Subjects in Mid-Nineteenth-Century Neoclassicism," [chapter] Blackberries and Redbones: Critical Articulations of Black Hair/Body Politics in Africana Communities, eds. Regina E. Spellers and Kimberly R. Moffitt, (Cresskill, NJ: Hampton Press, Inc., 2010). ISBN 9781572738805
- "The 'Hottentot Venus' in Canada: Modernism, Censorship and the Racial Limits of Female Sexuality," [chapter] Queerly Canadian: An Introductory Reader in Sexuality Studies, eds. Maureen Fitzgerald and Scott Rayler (Toronto, ON: Canadian Scholars Press, 2012). ISBN 9781551304007
- Wanted (Toronto, ON: Art Gallery of Ontario, 2017). ISBN 9781894243995
- "Servant, Savage or Sarah: Enslaved Black Female Subjects in Canadian Art and Fugitive Slave Advertisements," [chapter] Women in the "Promised Land" essays in African Canadian history, eds. Wanda Bernard, Boulou Ebanda and Nina Reid-Maroney (Toronto; Vancouver: Women's Press, 2018). ISBN 9780889616066
- "Remembering Canadian Slavery. Black Subjects in Historical Quebec Art.," [chapter] Engaging with diversity: multidisciplinary reflections on plurality from Québec, eds. Stephan Gervais, Mary Anne Poutanen and Raffaele Iacovino (Bruxelles; New York: Peter Lang, 2018). ISBN 9782807607675
- "Ran away from her master... a negroe girl named Thursday": examining evidence of punishment, isolation, and trauma in Nova Scotia and Quebec fugitive slave advertisements," [chapter] Legal violence and the limits of the law, eds. Joshua Nichols and Amy Swiffen (Abingdon, Oxon; New York, NY: Routledge, Taylor & Francis Group, 2018). ISBN 9781138814141

== Recognition ==
Charmaine Nelson has received a Woman of Distinction Award from the Montreal's Women's YWCA in 2012 (Arts and Culture Category) as well as a Teaching Award from The Arts Undergraduate Society of McGill University (2016), and McGill's Faculty Award for Equity and Community Building (2016).
