= Christopher Cozier =

Trinidadian multidisciplinary artist (born 1959)

Cristopher Cozier
- Born: 1959 (age 66–67); Trinidad and Tobago
- Education: BFA, Maryland Institute College of Art; MFA, Rutgers University
- Occupations: Multidisciplinary artist and cultural critic
- Awards: Prince Claus Fund (2013); Pollock-Krasner Foundation (2004); Pérez Prize (2023)

Cristopher Cozier (born 1959, Port of Spain, Trinidad and Tobago) is a multidisciplinary, contemporary artist and cultural critic based in Trinidad. He left Trinidad to study in the United States in 1983, and has been exhibiting in and outside of the Caribbean since. Cozier is the co-director of Alice Yard, an arts initiative in Trinidad and Tobago.

== Early life and education ==
Cristopher Cozier grew up in Port of Spain, where he lives and works. Cozier studied painting at the Royal Victoria Institute with M. P. Alladin. Cozier studied graphic design at the John S. Donaldson Technical Institute. In 1983, he relocated to the United States to earn his BFA in painting from the painting at the Maryland Institute College of Art, Baltimore. Soon after, he acquired an MFA from the Mason Gross School of the Arts at Rutgers University, New Jersey. In 1988, he returned to Trinidad and Tobago.

== Work ==
Cozier works with drawing, prints, sculpture, video, and installation to comment on the impact of colonial economies and transatlantic histories around the world from a Caribbean perspective. He has been investigating and basing his practice on the writings and perspectives of Trinidadian historian C. L. R. James.

In 2005, filmmaker Richard Fung released the documentary Uncomfortable: The Art of Cristopher Cozier. He was an artist-in-residence at Dartmouth College in the fall of 2007. As a cultural critic, Cozier has written about the work of Nicole Awai (2004) and video artist Maksaens Denis (2005) for BOMB Magazine.

Cozier's first solo show in the United States was held at David Krut Projects, a South African gallery in Chelsea, in which he shown drawings and prints of the colonial architecture in the West Indies that speaks to the colonial heritage in the Caribbean. In 2024, Cozier returned to the gallery for a solo presentation that integrates works on paper, sound and vision.

Cozier has participated in the Havana Biennial, Cuba; 10th Berlin Biennale (2018), Germany; 14th Sharjah Biennial (2019), in the United Arab Emirates; the Liverpool Biennial (2021); United Kingdom; 6th Prospect New Orleans, on view at the Contemporary Art Center (2024), Louisiana; among others.

=== Tropical Night series (2006–2014) ===
Tropical Nights is a large series of 268 works on paper that reflect on post-colonial histories in the Caribbean and its relation to the artists' own life experience. The work is in the holdings of the Museum of Modern Art, New York.

== Collections ==
Cozier works are featured in the collections of the MCA , Chicago, and the Museum of Modern Art, New York; among others.

== Awards and recognition ==
Cozier is the recipient of the Pollock-Krasner Foundation Grant (2004), he is a Prince Claus Fund Laureate (2013), a winner of the Pérez Prize (2023). and the Roy Lichtenstein Award 2026.
