= Barbara Prézeau-Stephenson =

Haitian artist and art historian (born 1965)

Barbara Prézeau-Stephenson (born December 1965) is a Haitian artist and art historian.

She was born Barbara Prézeau in Port-au-Prince and was educated at the Ecole Nationale Des Arts, studying with Ludovic Booz, Rose-Marie Desruisseau and Frank Louissaint. Her mother operated an art gallery in Pétion-Ville. Prézeau-Stephenson also studied dance with Lavinia Williams and attended drama workshops organized by the Institut Français in Haiti. In 1985, she traveled to Canada, where she studied visual arts and art history at the University of Ottawa. She also lived and worked in Dakar and France. She completed a MA in management of cultural organizations at the Université Paris-Dauphine.

Prézeau-Stephenson returned to Haiti in 1995. She established the Africamerica Foundation and the Transcultural Forum for Contemporary Art. In 2007, the Museum of Haitian Art held a retrospective of her work from the period 1986 to 2000. Her work has appeared in exhibitions in New York City, Montreal, Ottawa, Paris, Seville, San Diego, Brussels, Chicago, San Francisco and Quito. Prézeau-Stephenson has created paintings, sculptures and art installations; she was one of the first female Haitian artists to create land art.
