= Jade Nasogaluak Carpenter =

Inuvialuk artist

Jade Nasogaluak Carpenter (also known as Kablusiak, their name in the Sallirmiutun dialect of Inuvialuktun) is an Inuvialuk artist and curator based in Calgary, Alberta, Canada. They (Note: Nasogulak Carpenter uses they/them pronouns.) serve on the Indigenous Advisory Circle at the Winnipeg Art Gallery and is a guest curator tasked with programming the inaugural exhibitions of the WAG Inuit Art Centre. It was originally intended to open in 2020, but instead opened in 2021. They create soap stone carvings of every day and unexpected items to challenge the traditional ideas of Inuit art.

== Early life ==
Jade Nasogaluak Carpenter was born in Yellowknife, Northwest Territories. Their mother is from Tuktoyaktuk, Northwest Territories and their father is from Sachs Harbour, Northwest Territories.

== Education ==
Nasogaluak Carpenter holds a Bachelor of Fine Arts in Drawing from the Alberta University of the Arts and a diploma in Fine Art from MacEwan University. In 2018, they completed the Indigenous Curatorial Research Practicum at the Banff Centre.

== Accomplishments ==
In 2018, Jade Nasogaluak Carpenter was awarded the inaugural Primary Colours/Couleurs primaires Emerging Artist Award. Their soap stone carvings were displayed at Art Mûr in Montreal, Canada as part of the 4th edition of the Contemporary Native Art Biennial and their photographic work entitled (That’s A-Mori) featured as part of Resilience:The National Billboard Exhibition Project, a billboard exhibition organized by Mentoring Artists for Women's Art (MAWA) in response to Call to Action #79 of the Truth and Reconciliation Commission Report.

They were also selected to participate in the Canadian Art TD North/South Artist Exchange.

Kablusiak was named the 2023 recipient of the Sobey Art Award.
