= Latitude 53 =

Artist-run centre in Edmonton, Canada (1973–)

Coordinates: 53.541881°N 113.490709°W

Latitude 53 Contemporary Visual Culture, more commonly known as Latitude 53, is an artist-run centre in Edmonton, Alberta, Canada.

Founded in 1973 by a collective of Edmonton artists. As far back as 1991, Latitude 53 has been heralded as "consistently been the most interesting, risk-taking public gallery in town for years." In 2013, they relocated from their main floor space in the Great West Saddlery Building to their current home at 10242 - 106 Street in Edmonton. Latitude 53 is a member of Alberta Association of Artist-run centres.

Artexte Information Centre in Montreal, Quebec holds 69 of their exhibition catalogues in their collection.

Latitude 53 has two co-executive directors, Michelle Campos Castillo and Hannah Quimper-Swiderski.

== Notable exhibitions ==
- Lyndal Osborne (1974)
- Rita McKeough (1980)
- Janet Cardiff (1989)
- George Bures Miller (1989)
- Micah Lexier (1989)
- Diana Thorneycroft (1991)
- Kent Monkman (1994)
- Luis Jacob (2002)
- Jon Sasaki (2009)
- Brenda Draney (2010)
- Jason de Haan (2011)
- Luther Konadu (2018)
- Bridget Moser (2019)
- Lauren Crazybull (2020)
