= Anique Jordan =

Canadian artist

- Born: Anique Jordan; Toronto, Ontario
- Education: B.A. International Development, York University, Toronto, (2011); Masters of Environmental Studies, York University, Toronto (2015); Latin America and Caribbean Studies Graduate Diploma, York University, Toronto (2015); Business and the Environment Graduate Diploma, Schulich School of Business, Toronto (2015); Entrepreneurship Certificate, Schulich Centre for Executive Education, Toronto (2015)
- Known for: multi-disciplinary artist, writer, curator and entrepreneur
- Awards: Toronto Arts Foundation Emerging Artist of the Year (2017); Ontario Association of Art Galleries Award for Migrating the Margins (2017); Toronto Friends of the Visual Arts Artist Prize (2020).
- Website: www.aniquejjordan.com

Anique Jordan is a Canadian multi-disciplinary artist, writer, curator and entrepreneur known for her work in photography, sculpture, and performance. Her artwork challenges historical narratives, reinterpreting the past in order to develop a vision of the future. Among her themes are black history in Canada, working-class communities, the relationship between the country's black and Indigenous peoples, and the work black people have put into explaining and fighting against racism.

== Biography ==
Anique Jordan's family immigrated from Trinidad. She was born and grew up in Scarborough. She received a B.A. in International Development at York University, Toronto (2011) and a Masters of Environmental Studies at York University (2015), a Latin America and Caribbean Studies Graduate Diploma, again from York University (2015) and a Business and the Environment Graduate Diploma from the Schulich School of Business, Toronto (2015) as well as an Entrepreneurship Certificate, at the Schulich Centre for Executive Education, Toronto (2015).

In 2012, she was gifted a family archive from a cousin which told of her family's Caribbean roots. She used it as the basis for her Masters thesis at York (2015) titled Possessed: A Genealogy of Black Women, Hauntology and Art as Survival and is writing a book with that title. Possessed was based on the family history of a particular group of Black loyalists, who became freed people of colour, in the twin islands of Trinidad and Tobago. It is an autobiographical account that reflects a larger historical context. In the thesis, she said that at a young age, she learned to document and archive.

Although she had no formal art training, Jordan made her first photographic art work by asking the question, "How did we survive as Black people through transatlantic slavery?" All that she knew were the stories she found on television in the form of a joke or as being enslaved as in the violent program Roots. She found that in order to speak about history, she had to become an archivist, but used as a model, carnival celebrations where anything can happen along the parade route. She also has found her voice in describing the intersection of community economic development and art. She wants her practice to stem from and return to the communities that inform it.

In 2015, Jordan was invited to be one of 10 black artists accompanying a Jean-Michel Basquiat show at the Art Gallery of Ontario. The work she created was of her mother and elder aunts wearing uniforms for the war of 1812. In 2016, she created work to accompany the Lawren Harris show Idea of the North at the Art Gallery of Ontario by addressing the black communities active in the Ward area of Toronto in the early 1900s where Harris painted in his early career. In that area, behind Toronto City Hall, she found there was once a historic Black church and two homes owned by one black family. To avoid bounty hunters, the name of this church (as well as others) was changed from the African Methodist Episcopal church to the British Methodist Episcopal Church. The work she created had two parts: a woman at the crossroads and a photograph re-enacting a congregation in the church as well as orchestrating a performance on the subject in its wider implications. Her work was praised as offering an alternate view to Harris's version.

In 2017, she was included in a panel discussion accompanying the opening of Position as Required, a show at the Art Gallery of Windsor and in a show titled The Arts Against Post-Racialism: Strengthening Resistance Against Contemporary Canadian Blackface, spearheaded at McGill University, Montreal, for which she created Scream Café, a performance in which audience members were invited to participate and witness an act of audible or silent screaming. In 2020, she curated an exhibition called Three-Thirty for the Contact Photography Festival in Toronto about cultural landmarks in Scarborough’s Malvern neighbourhood and ideas of power, land and agencies that define it. She titled the exhibition Three-Thirty to play off the after-school programs on which many kids in Scarborough rely. In the summer of 2020, inspired by a social media post following the murder of George Floyd by Minneapolis Police officers, she created We Have Done Enough, a 21-foot (6.4 m) installation for the Nia Centre for the Arts that challenged the viewer to consider the significant work that Black people have put into explaining and fighting against racism.

As well as being part of the curatorial team at the Art Gallery of Ontario (she was the co-curator of Every. Now. Then: Reframing Nationhood, along with Andrew Hunter), Jordan was the Executive Director of Whippersnapper Gallery, Toronto. She has had residencies at the University of West Indies (Trinidad and Tobago) (2017–2018) and was the Artist-In-Residence, Osgoode Hall Law School, Toronto (2017–2018). She is a member of the collective Black Wimmin Artists (BWA) which she founded, a network and resource sharing platform of Black women artists and arts workers across Canada, begun in 2016. A 2015 photo work by Jordan, Sixth Company Battalion – The Aunties (1/3) is in the collection of the Art Gallery of Guelph. Mas' at 94 Chestnut is in the collection of the Art Gallery of Ontario.

In 2024, Anique Jordan presented a solo exhibition of new work at Patel Brown Gallery in Toronto, Ontario, titled Underbelly. The solo exhibition closed with a conversation between Jordan and Fred Moten, moderated by Dr. Evelyn Amponsah.

== Private life ==
In 2019, she was mentioned as one of five Canadians bringing diversity to Pop culture in "Fashion magazine".
