= Art Gallery of Mississauga =

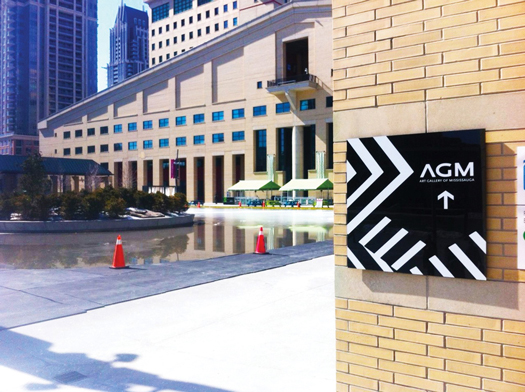
- Established: 1987
- Location: 300 City Centre Drive, Mississauga, Ontario, Canada
- Coordinates: 43°35′20.07″N 79°38′37.96″W
- Type: Public Art gallery
- Director: Anna Gulbinski
- Website: www.artgalleryofmississauga.com

The Art Gallery of Mississauga (AGM) is a public, not-for-profit art gallery in Mississauga, Ontario, Canada. It is located at the Mississauga Civic Centre right on Celebration Square across from Square One Mall. The Gallery is open six days per week (closed Mondays) and offers free admission and guided exhibition tours in addition to regular art social events, workshops for adult learners, and youth programmes for schools, universities and community groups.

The Gallery holds approximately 18 exhibitions a year on a rotating basis.

== History ==
In 2013, the AGM hired artist Camille Turner to be Mississauga's first ever Artist in Residence. Turner was interested in the hidden histories of Mississauga. Her projects for the AGM included the (un)settler Community Journal Project and the 5&Dime walking tour, exploring strip malls as cultural spaces.

In 2014, the AGM launched an extensive re-branding campaign, characterized by a new design created by The White Room in Toronto. This campaign has received international recognition in design magazines, and a finalist in the Graphis 2015 annual design competition.

== Permanent Collection ==
The AGM's Permanent Collection numbers over 500 works by regional and national artists. In 2013, the AGM launched a digital archiving project, funded by the Museums Assistance Program and the Museums and Technology Fund, which created an accessible online database launched on the AGM website in 2014.

Because of space limitations, the Gallery had a moratorium on collecting since 2008. In 2014, the AGM presented a new collections policy, focusing on digital and lens-based works, with a particular focus on regional artists, iconic Canadian works and works by artists representing the social fabric of Mississauga. The AGM's Permanent Collection was made accessible on an online archive in December 2014.

== Expansion ==
Long considered "the best kept secret in Mississauga" due to the lack of visibility of its location inside the Civic Centre, in 2011 the AGM commissioned Lord Cultural Resources to conduct a facility expansion plan, with the objective of potentially moving the gallery into a new building to increase visibility and exhibition space. The Lord Cultural study reported that, despite being in the sixth largest city in Canada, the AGM was the smallest public art gallery. In June 2014, past AGM Director | Curator Stuart Keeler and Board President Mike Douglas appeared before Mississauga City Council to request support for a facility expansion. Gallery visitors grew from just under 19,000 in 2011 to over 30,000 in 2013. Options presented include an expansion of the AGM's current facility in City Hall and a new home in the Living Arts Centre across the street. City Council was supportive of the request, and asked staff to examine feasibility.

== Roots and Branches | Education ==
The AGM acquired a grant from the Ontario Trillium Foundation to fund educational and engagement programming from 2013 – 2014. Roots and Branches is a comprehensive, hands-on approach to learning that facilitates free visits by Artists in Residence, who collaborate with Teachers to deliver lesson plans and visual art-inspired activities that extend standardized curriculum, while exposing students to critical processes in contemporary artistic practice.

The program as well provides free Tours of the Gallery with free Bus Transit to and from the school site and the Art Gallery of Mississauga.

Beyond the Art Trail | Artist Professional Practices Programme (APP)

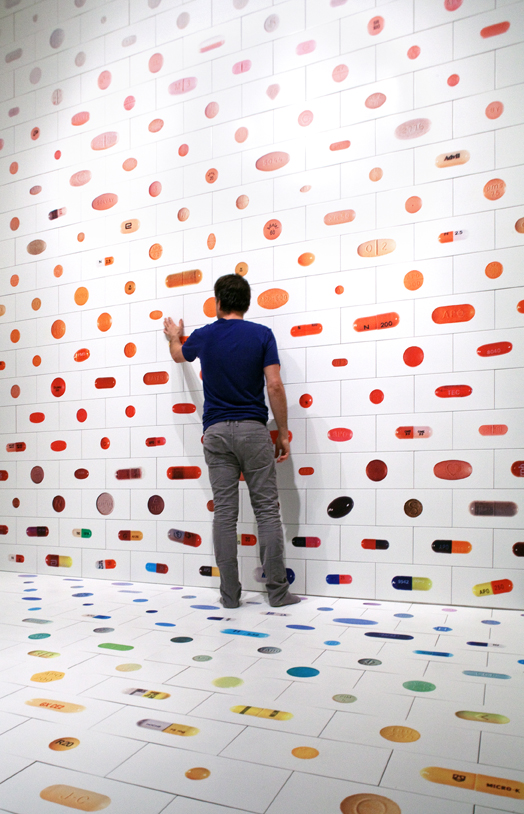
Cindy Blazevic: PillBilly Fantasia, 2012. XIT-RM, AGM

== Living Waters ==
Living Waters is an interdisciplinary arts and environment project in collaboration with Corsair Public School and artist Christopher McLeod. Teaching artist Christopher McLeod will facilitate student projects that look at the centrality of water to all environmental and sustainability issues. Students will learn about the importance of water to the travel, trade and survival of Indigenous peoples of this region; the Anishinaabe, the Wendat and the Haudenosaunee. Projects and field trips will emphasize the location of communities in relation to water to maintain food cultivation and survival.

== XIT-RM ==
In 2012, the AGM opened the XIT-RM Project Space, an exhibition space sponsored by the RBC Foundation that is dedicated to emerging regional artists. Notable exhibitions include: Contemporary Jamaican Art circa1962 | circa2012, Lise Beaudry: Sur la glace | Standing on Ice (Winner, BMW Exhibition Prize 2012), Genius Loci, 011+91 | 011+92, F'd Up!, The Sahmat Collective: Art and Activism in India Since 1989 (from The Smart Museum of Art, University of Chicago), Fausta Facciponte: Six Characters in Search of a Photograph, and Joy and Sorrow: Photographs and Films by Elisa Julia Gilmour and Ben Freedman

Six artists are selected annually by the gallery's curatorial team to exhibit work that honours the mission and mandate of the AGM, with an emphasis on contemporary art and critical engagement. Each exhibition features its own opening and is accompanied by a published catalogue with a curatorial essay.
