= A Space Gallery =

Canadian artist-run centre

Coordinates: 43.6478139°N 79.3945565°W

A Space is a Canadian artist-run centre located in Toronto, Ontario.

== Background ==
The gallery originated as the Nightingale Arts Council in 1970, and was founded in 1971. The name A Space Gallery was first used when the gallery established itself at 85 St. Nicholas Street. It was the first gallery in Toronto committed to the "urgent and emergent" in art. A Space was exactly what it was - "a space to fill...the scene of some pioneering efforts in the field of camera art, video and sound technology as put to work in artistic applications".

The first exhibition, Concept 70, was organized by Robert Bowers and Chris Youngs. It included works by Ian Carr-Harris, Stephen Cruise, John McEwen, Dennis Oppenheim and General Idea.

Today, the gallery focuses on political and social art work, such as the 2015 Detention exhibition.

A Space Gallery is one of the most well respected artist run centres in Canada, both for its history and the current exhibitions and public programs led by curator Vicky Moufawad-Paul.

A Space Gallery receives funding from the Canada Council for the Arts, the Ontario Arts Council, and the Toronto Arts Council.

== See also ==
- List of museums in Toronto
