= John Hall (Canadian artist) =

Canadian modernist painter from Alberta (born 1943)

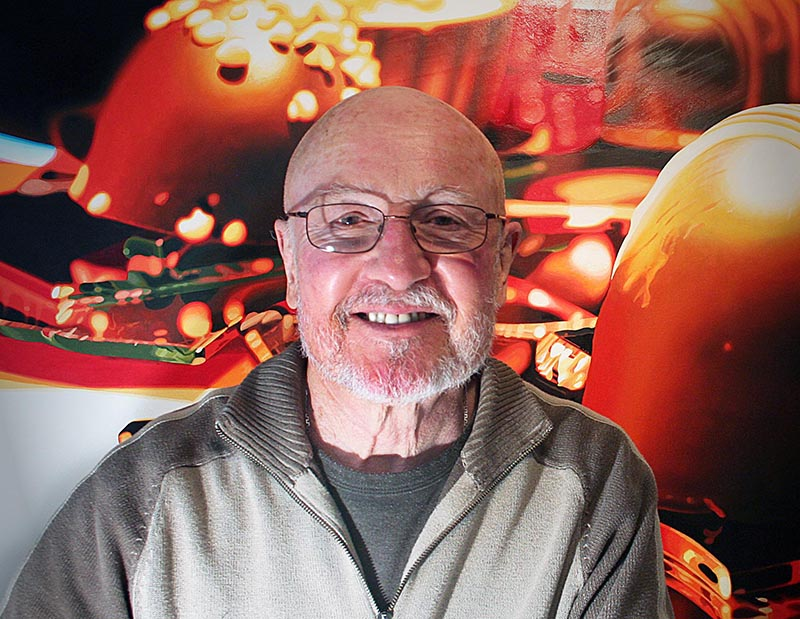
- John Hall in 2011
- Born: January 17, 1943 (age 83); Edmonton, Alberta, Canada
- Education: Alberta College of Art, Calgary (1960–1965), Instituto Allende, Mexico (1965–1966)
- Known for: Painter
- Spouse(s): Joice M. Hall, née Hanak (married 1964)
- Awards: member of the Royal Canadian Academy of Arts (1975)

John Hall RCA (born January 17, 1943) is a Canadian modernist painter from Alberta, known for his highly realistic painting style.

== Life ==
He has taught fine art at Ohio Wesleyan University, the Alberta College of Art and Design, and the University of Calgary (1971–1998) (since 1998, he has been Professor Emeritus of the Department of Art). Currently, he is based in West Kelowna, British Columbia.

== Career ==
Throughout his career, Hall has focused on painstakingly accurate still-life paintings of everyday objects. He has said in the past that he chooses the objects both for their symbolism and for their formal relationships. In 2016, curator Liz Wylie suggested that he is moved and inspired by the effects of light on objects.

In 1969, he taught at Ohio Wesleyan University and while there travelled to nearby American museums and New York to see American Pop art of the 1960s. As Wylie points out, such art had a huge role in allowing artists to pursue representational painting, especially in the face of the dominant art forms in their ascendancies at the same time – Minimalism and the various forms of conceptual art. Hall felt confirmed by American New Realist painters in his choice of still-life subject, though what he painted varied. He chose grungy subject matter and painted on a huge scale. The result was fascinating and unique.

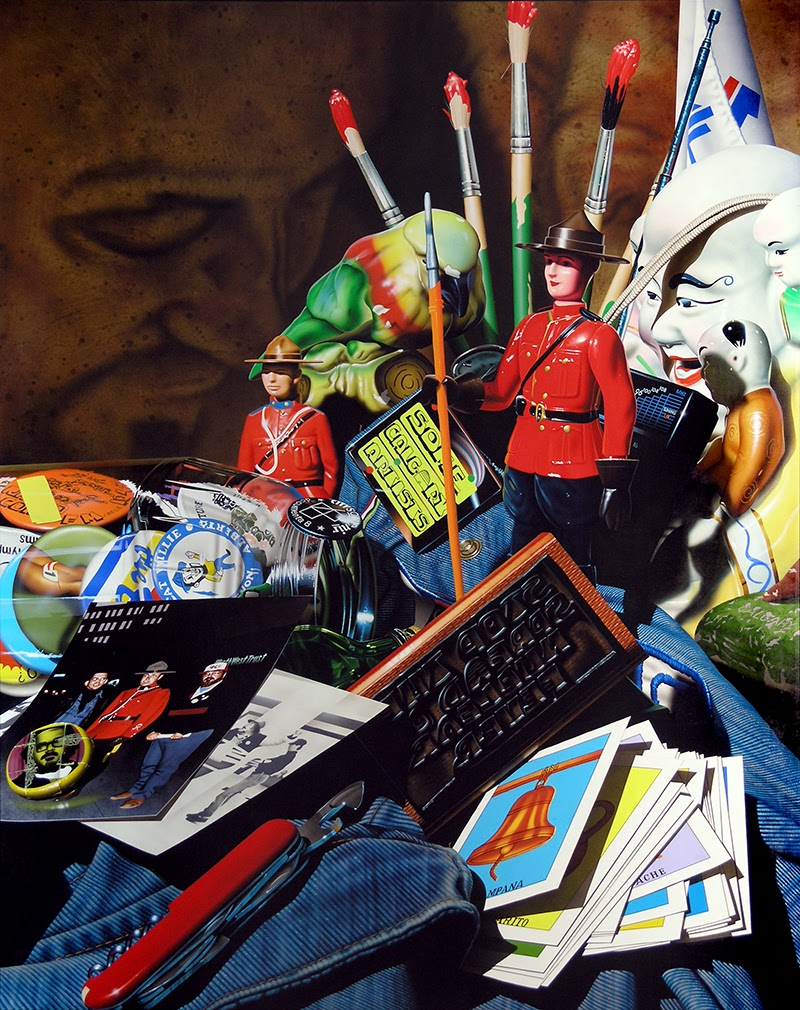
Nuclear Fever (1994), acrylic on canvas

While in Ohio, Hall created a gigantic Garbage triptych measuring six metres long, which is now in the collection of the Nickle Galleries at the University of Calgary. He continued to paint this series when he moved back to Canada to Calgary, though over time, varied his practice to encompass new themes.

He spent a year painting in New York in 1979/80, the same time that he painted his canvas Harry (1980) and was given a touring one-person show by the National Gallery of Canada. In the 1980s, Hall created his Tourist Series and his Toys series, followed by his Still-Life Portrait series, begun in 1984. These last works were featured in a one-person touring show organized by the Agnes Etherington Art Centre at Queen’s University in Kingston, Ontario, in 1989. Mixed in between all these series were his Mexican-themed paintings, done during his annual six-month stays there between 1988 and 1999, which culminated in a retrospective exhibition at Mexico City's Museo de Arte Moderno in 1994.

In the 1990s, Hall began to exploit the information and results possible by using digital photography and Adobe Photoshop. Since moving to West Kelowna in 1999, Hall has completed several series of work, many of domestic still-life subjects such as tea cups and food, followed by a series on vegetables and fruit.

Hall has also participated in group exhibitions in Canada, the United States, Great Britain, Europe and Japan. He has received commissions from Calgary's Foothills Hospital, the Royal Bank of Canada, and Cineplex Odeon. Hall was also perhaps the first artist in Canada to publish a selection of his work on a CD-ROM.

In 2009, Hall and Calgary-based artist Alexandra Haeseker, a long-time collaborator and colleague of Hall's, showed together in Pendulum/ Pendula. The exhibition consisted of collaborative realistic paintings which both had done in Canada and Mexico from 1992 to 1998. Each painted half of the canvas. These paintings were seen in many public galleries – four in Mexico and four in British Columbia.

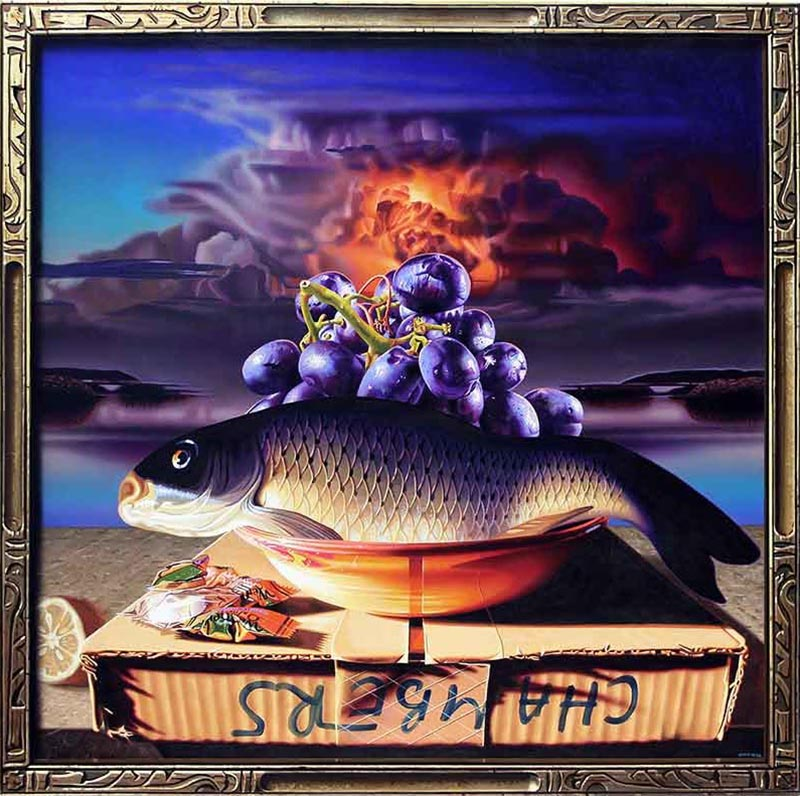
Chambers (2020), acrylic on canvas

In 2016, the Kelowna Art Gallery organized John Hall: Travelling Light: A forty-five-year survey of paintings curated by Liz Wylie. The exhibition traveled to the Nickle Art Museum at the University of Calgary in 2017. It was accompanied by a book, published by Black Dog Publishing in the United Kingdom, which included colour reproductions of all of the works in the show and also texts by Wylie and by Alexandra Haeseker.

In 2016, he began the series he called Framed. In 2020, he based the composition and some of the elements of his paintings on art history, using still-life painting done in past centuries as a springboard. In 2025, he and Ron Moppett did a show working together to create paintings on which both collaborated, one doing the frame, the other the canvas or vice versa, titled Framed: John Hall and Ron Moppett at Loch Gallery, Calgary, Alberta.

== Selected public collections ==
- Alberta Foundation for the Arts, Calgary
- Art Gallery of Hamilton, Hamilton, Ontario
- Art Gallery of Nova Scotia, Halifax, Nova Scotia
- Art Gallery of Ontario, Toronto (own Ricochet, 1980s)
- Canada Council Art Bank, Ottawa
- Confederation Art Gallery & Museum, Charlottetown
- Edmonton Art Gallery
- Glenbow Museum, Calgary, Alberta
- Kitchener/Waterloo Art Gallery, Kitchener, Ontario
- MacKenzie Art Gallery, Regina (own Harry (1980))
- Memorial University Art Gallery, Newfoundland
- Mendel Art Gallery, Saskatoon
- National Gallery of Canada, Ottawa
- University of Calgary
- University College of Cape Breton Art Gallery
- Winnipeg Art Gallery

== Personal life ==
He is married to painter Joice M. Hall.

== Bibliography ==
- Devonshire Baker, Suzanne (1980). Artists of Alberta. Edmonton: University of Alberta. ISBN 0888640307.
- Wylie, Liz (2016). John Hall: Travelling Light: A 45-Year Survey of Paintings. Kelowna: Black Dog Publishing/Kelowna Art Gallery. ISBN 978-1-910433-86-7.
