= Derek Michael Besant =

Canadian artist (born 1950)

- Born: 1950 (age 75–76); Alberta, Canada
- Education: BFA (1969–1973) and Graduate Studies (1974), University of Calgary
- Known for: graphic artist, installation artist
- Spouse: Alexandra Haeseker
- Elected: Royal Canadian Academy of Arts (1978) Society of Austrian Artists (2016)

Derek Michael Besant RCA (born 1950) is a Canadian artist living in Calgary, Alberta who, since the 1980s, has created prints, watercolours and large-scale art, shown in exhibitions and as public art projects in Canada and abroad. Since the mid-1990s, he has developed working with the new technology available in photographic imaging to create experimental prints and print installations.

== Career ==
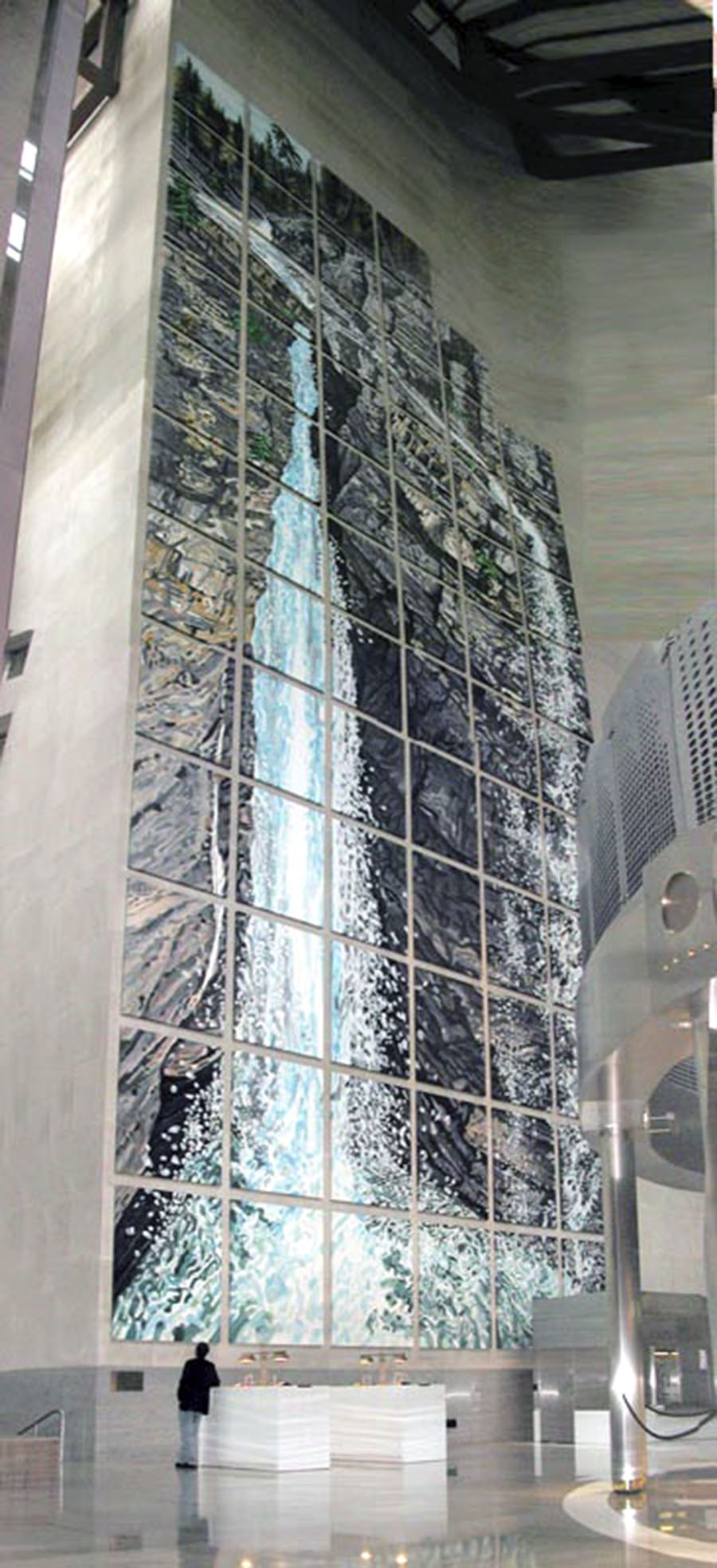
Waterfall (1989), Scotia Plaza, Toronto. UV epoxy on canvas grid.

Besant studied at University of Calgary, where he received a BFA Honours in 1973 and continued with Graduate Studies in 1974. He was the Exhibitions Designer for the Glenbow Museum between 1973–1977. He designed exhibitions throughout the art gallery and museum spaces, along with catalogues and travelling exhibitions. The Alberta University of Art and Design invited him to teach in the Drawing and Fine Arts Department in 1977. He taught there for forty years and retired from teaching in 2017. He was the Head of the Drawing Department between 1979–1993. Since 1980, he has also been a lecturer at Texas State University in San Marcos.

== Commissions ==
Some of his public commissions include: The Flatiron Mural in 1980 behind Toronto's landmark Gooderham flatiron building on Front Street, Waterfall at 15 storeys high inside the atrium of Scotia Plaza at King & Bay in 1989, two murals for Worldwide Centre at 58th and 8th Manhattan Cineplex New York City in 1989, and Train of Thought, a series of portraits at the uOttawa station of the Ottawa O-Train in 2018.

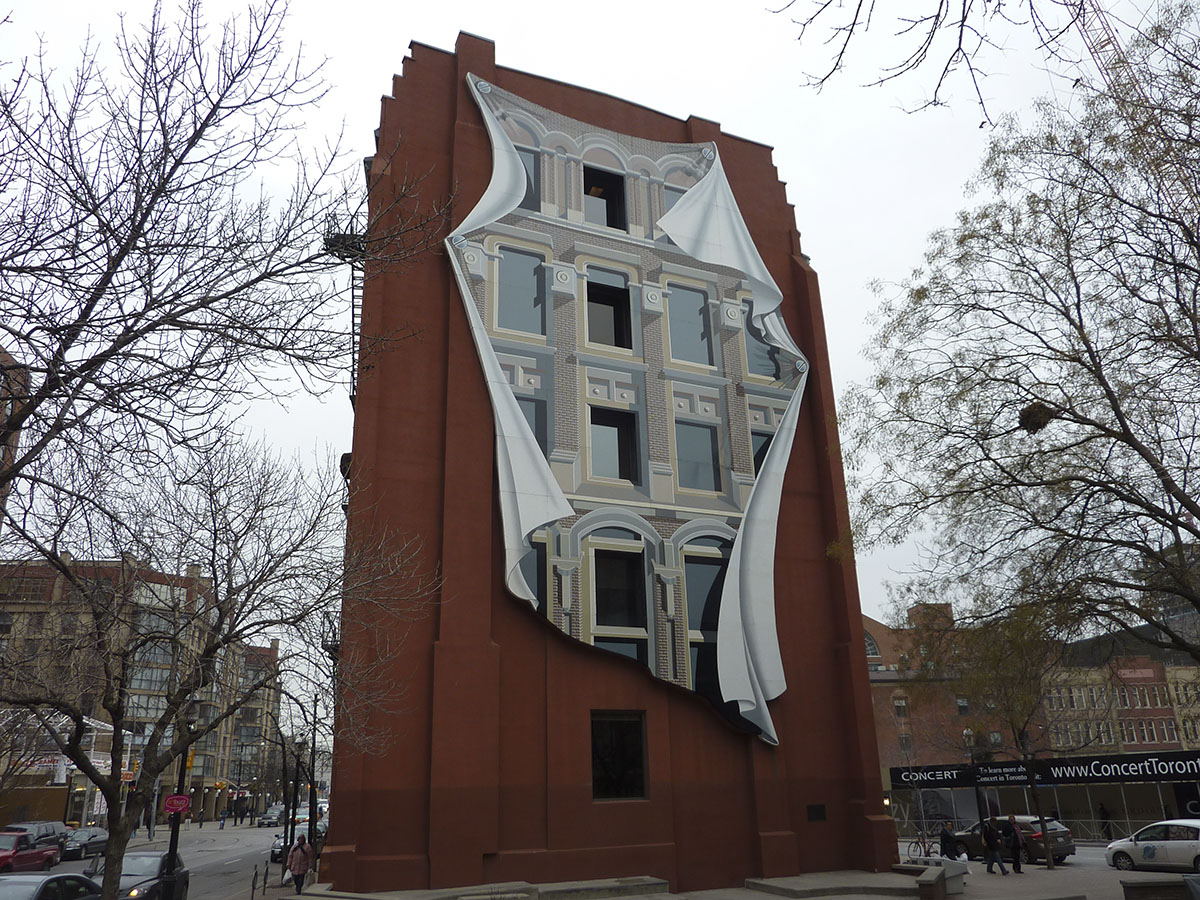
Flatiron Mural (1980), Gooderham Building, Toronto.

== Selected public exhibitions ==
Besant's exhibitions have included: representing Canada in the Sharjah Biennial in 2003, United Arab Emirates, University of London Goldsmiths College, Tokyo Media-Art Festival, Metropolitan Museum of Photography in Japan, the 2004 SIGGRAPH International Conference on Computer Imaging + Interactive Technologies, Los Angeles in 2004, and in many other international exhibitions since then, including one-person shows such as 15 Restless Nights (2008), Body Of Water (2008), and The End Of Language (2011) which have been shown in various galleries in Canada, and in Edinburgh, Madrid, Tokyo and Cambridge, UK, among other places.

In 2018, for the exhibition The Dark Woods (Revisited), curated by Lubos Culen for the Vernon Public Art Gallery, Vernon, British Columbia, he created large scale (though deliberately slightly out-of-focus) images using UV thermal transfer printing which contained embedded fragments of text from a book by Alberto Pérez-Gómez, accompanied by a video projection of dark woods environments. In 2020, his exhibition Drawing Conclusions in which he used lenticular and latex UV ink technologies to record architectural construction sites was shown at the International Duoro Printmaking Biennial held at the Côa Museum in northern Portugal. He has continued, despite Covid, to participate in international projects such as, in 2021, developing five large-scale shaped engraved images that echoed his earlier work from unmade hotel beds as landscape which were installed at La Boverie Musée, Liège, Belgium in its Engraving Triennial exhibition. In 2022, The 3rd International Müvészeti Digital Triennial premiered his new video production Faultline in Budapest, Hungary and he was among 16 international artists commissioned to produce new in-situ art installations on the theme of Das Paradies liegt vors Uns (Paradise in front of us) for the "125th Anniversary of The Bruerei Clemens Härle" at Bodensee on Lac Constance in Southern Bavaria, Germany.

Also in 2022, he curated ANTHEM / Expressions of Canadian Identity of new artist book works which premiered at The Bibliotheca Alexandrina in Egypt and opened in Toronto at the Canadian Language Museum in 2023. In 2023, he exhibited a video installation titled Homeless, at the Council of the City of Sydney Libraries, Australia.

== Critical response ==
Besant's Flatiron Mural (1980) on Toronto's Gooderham Building has been called "a symbol of the liveliness of Toronto's contemporary art scene" (Boston Globe) and along with the building itself, "a landmark in its own right" (Toronto Star). Writing about its unveiling in the Globe and Mail, John Bentley Mays called it an "engineering masterpiece and an artistic triumph."

A 1985 review in the Edmonton Journal described Besant's images of "structures in the midst of diagrammatic environments" as "unusual and highly individual", and "dramatic enough to transcend the ordinary and encourage a thorough visual investigation."

== Controversy ==
In 2017, an investigation was ordered by the City of Calgary into allegations that Besant had plagiarized the content of a temporary public art installation. Besant apologized and the mural was removed.

== Awards and honours ==
- Member of the Royal Canadian Academy of Arts (1978)
- Alberta Governor General's Award in Art (1980)
- World Culture Prize in Research Arts & Letters from Milan, Italy (1983);
- Signature Sculpture Competition ($100,000), Mount Royal College (1989)
- Lieutenant Governor of Alberta's Art Achievement Award (1999)
- Distinguished Alumni Award from University of Calgary (1999)
- Special Award for remarkable contribution in graphic art of the world, Bitola, Macedonia (2018)
- Member of the Society of Austrian Artists, Künstlerhaus, Vienna, Austria
- Member of the Editorial Board of PRINTMAKING TODAY, London UK.
