= Ron Moppett =

Canadian painter (born 1945)

- Born: Ron Benjamin Moppett; March 12, 1945 (age 81); Woking, Surrey, England
- Education: Alberta College of Art and Design, Calgary (1963 to 1967); Instituto de Allende, San Miguel Allende, Mexico (1968)
- Known for: painter, curator, gallery director, teacher
- Awards: Canada Council grants; Victor Martyn Lynch-Staunton Award (1986); Gershon Iskowitz Prize (1997); Alberta Centennial Medal, 2005
- Elected: 2002 Member, Royal Canadian Academy of Arts

Ronald Benjamin Moppett RCA (born March 12, 1945) is an English-born Canadian painter, and former curator, gallery director, and teacher. He is known primarily for abstract paintings and for works in which he combines paint and collage, along with non-traditional materials. Moppett is based in Calgary, Alberta.

== Biography ==
Moppett was born in England on March 12, 1945, the eldest of four children, and immigrated to Calgary with his family in 1957. He has worked at different times as a curator, gallery director and teacher while pursuing a career as a painter.

== Selected exhibitions ==
Moppett has been exhibiting since 1966. In 1982, a retrospective of his work was shown at the Walter Phillips Gallery at The Banff Centre. In 1988, he showed recent work with the 49th Parallel Centre for Contemporary Art, New York and in 1990, Katharine Ylitalo for the Glenbow Museum in Calgary organized Painting Nature with a Mirror; Ron Moppett, 1974-1989, a travelling exhibition. In 2010, Moppett showed his work in two group exhibitions, Triumphant Carrot: The Persistence of Still Life, at the Contemporary Art Gallery, Vancouver, British Columbia, and Roadmap: Starting Points and Side Roads in Building a Collection, the Nickle Arts Museum, Calgary, Alberta. In 2015, his sculpture and installation work was exhibited in a large survey at the Nickle Arts Museum titled Ron Moppett: Sculptur(al). In 2016, the Art Gallery of Alberta exhibited Damian Moppett + Ron Moppett: (every story has two sides). In 2017, the National Gallery of Canada curated a two-person show of Moppett and his son Damian Moppett, in its Masterpiece in Focus series.

In 2020, curator Mark Lanctôt in an exhibition titled Painting Nature with a Mirror (he used the name of Moppett`s earlier show) at the Musée d'art contemporain de Montréal created a portrait of Canadian painting in the 1980s which included Moppett among its artists.

Moppett has also created a mural, THESAMEWAYBETTER/READER, made of more than 950,000 mosaic tiles for Calgary's East Village (2012). Commissioned by the Calgary Municipal Land Corporation, the mural is 110 feet long. It is the largest free-standing mosaic mural in Canada.

In 2025, he and John Hall did a show working together to create paintings on which both collaborated, one doing the frame, the other the canvas or vice versa, titled Framed: John Hall and Ron Moppett at Loch Gallery, Calgary, Alberta.

== Awards ==
- 1986 Victor Martyn Lynch-Staunton Award;
- 1997 Gershon Iskowitz Prize;
- 2005 Alberta Centennial Medal;
- 2022 Honorary MFA recipient from AU;

== Collections ==
- The Canada Council Art Bank Collection
- Edmonton Art Gallery
- Glenbow Museum, Calgary
- MacKenzie Art Gallery, Regina
- Musée d'art contemporain, Montreal
- National Gallery of Canada, Ottawa
- Nickle Galleries, University of Calgary
- University of Lethbridge

== Sources ==
- MacDonald, Colin (1967). A Dictionary of Canadian Artists, vol. 4 (Third ed.). Canadian Paperbacks Publishing Ltd. ISBN 0-919554-13-X.
