= Charlottetown Boulder Park =

Boulder park in Prince Edward Island

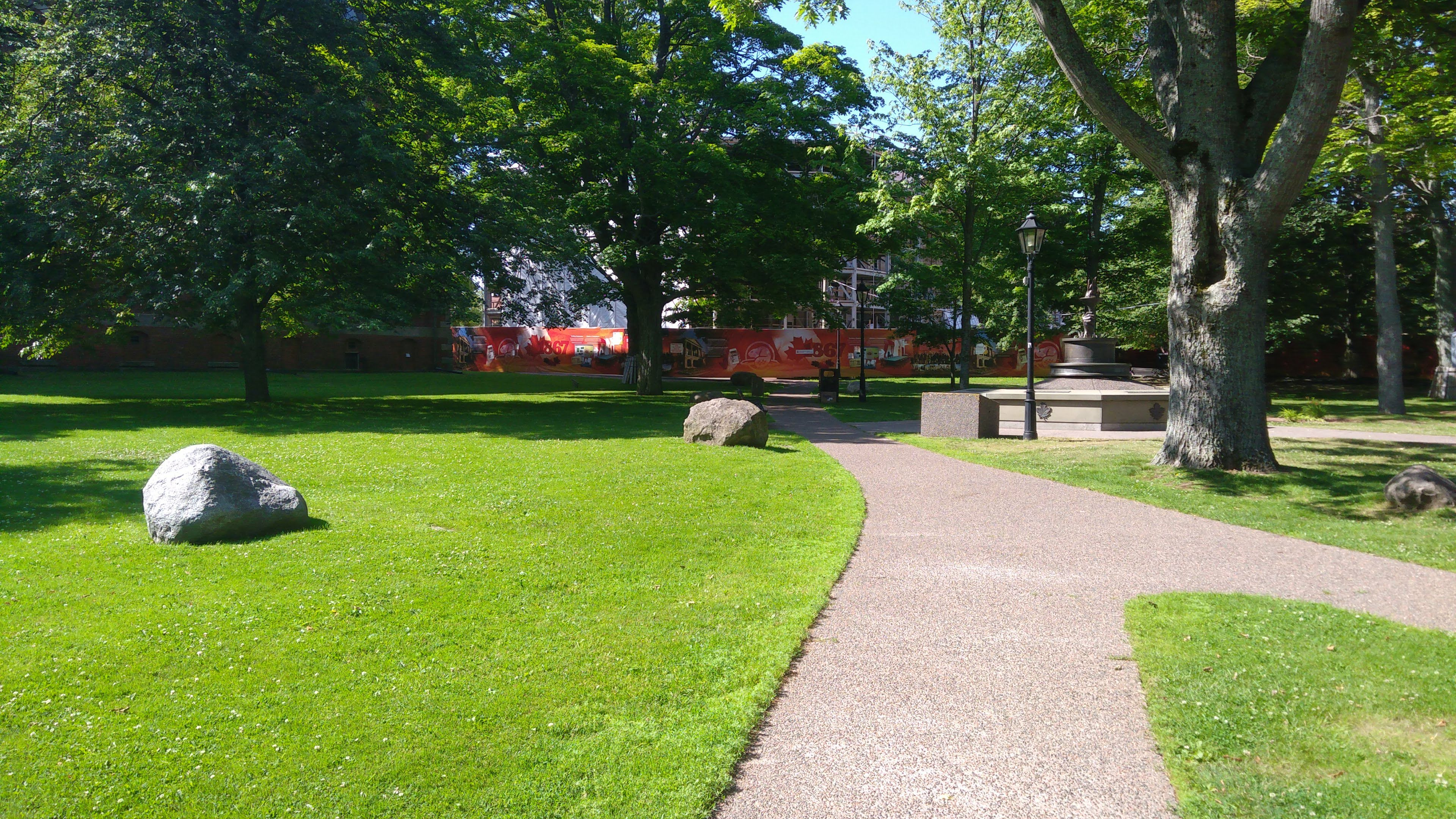
- Interactive map of Charlottetown Boulder Park
- Type: Boulder Park
- Location: Charlottetown, Prince Edward Island
- Coordinates: 46.2355°N 63.12587°W
- Opened: 1966
- Founder: Dr. Eric Harvie
- Operator: Confederation Centre of the Arts
- Open: All year

Charlottetown Boulder Park is an outdoor boulder park located in Charlottetown, Prince Edward Island. The park is located on the northern side of the Honourable George Coles Building, adjacent to Province House.

== History ==
The park was the idea of Dr. Eric Harvie, chairman of the Fathers of Confederation Memorial Citizens Foundation, and includes boulders from each of the Canadian provinces; each boulder includes a plaque that identifies the provinces from which the boulder came, along with the geological name of the rock formation. Harvie intended the park to commemorate the contribution of people from across Canada to the creation of the Confederation Centre of the Arts.

== Opening ==
The park opened in a ceremony on September 1, 1966, the 102nd anniversary of the start of the Charlottetown Conference. The landscaping for the park was funded by the Bank of Nova Scotia; Graham Scott, manager of the Charlottetown branch, and Dr. Frank MacKinnon, Chair of the Fathers of Confederation Memorial Trust, cut the ribbon.

== Transfer to City of Charlottetown ==
On March 26, 2025, the City of Charlottetown announced that it would purchase the Boulder Park for $4.8 million from the Confederation Centre of the Arts.

== Boulders ==
Province	Boulder Type	Photo	Plaque	Location
Alberta	Devonian Dolomite			46.235768°N 63.12575°W
British Columbia	Quartz Diorite			46.235814°N 63.125654°W
Manitoba	Tyndall Limestone			46.235511°N 63.126098°W
New Brunswick	Limestone Containing Archaeozoon acadiense			46.2354°N 63.125661°W
Newfoundland	Lower Ordovician Limestone			46.235426°N 63.126028°W
Nova Scotia	North Mountain Basalt			46.235686°N 63.12572°W
Ontario	Biotite Hornblende Gneiss			46.235606°N 63.125415°W
Prince Edward Island	Sandstone			46.235583°N 63.12599°W
Quebec	Anorthosite			46.235556°N 63.125732°W
Saskatchewan	Granite			46.235337°N 63.125816°W
Canada	Jasper Conglomerate			46.235469°N 63.125855°W

=== Map of boulder locations ===
Boulders are sited over 1,000 square metres (0.25 acres) site between Church Street and Province House, just south of Grafton Street.

Map showing location of boulders in Charlottetown Boulder Park
1 Alberta
2 British Columbia
3 Manitoba
4 New Brunswick
5 Newfoundland
6 Nova Scotia
7 Ontario
8 Prince Edward Island
9 Quebec
10 Saskatchewan
11 Canada
