= Joice M. Hall =

Canadian artist (born 1943)

- Born: Joice Marlene Hanak; 1943; Edmonton, Alberta
- Education: Alberta College of Art (now Alberta University of the Arts) in Calgary, graduated in 1965
- Known for: painter of landscape panoramas
- Spouse: John Hall (m. 1964)

Joice M. Hall RCA (born 1943) is a Canadian artist from Alberta, now based in British Columbia. She is known primarily as a landscape painter of large panoramas.

== Life ==
Hanak was born in Edmonton, Alberta. She married John Hall in 1964 and earned a diploma from the Alberta College of Art (now the Alberta University of the Arts) in Calgary in 1965. At the school, she was taught painting techniques by Illingworth Kerr and appreciated that through him, she learned of the Group of Seven.

Hall lived in Calgary for almost 40 years. She and her husband, artist John Hall, also owned a home in San Miguel de Allende in central Mexico, where they spent half of the year during the 1990s. In 1999, they moved to West Kelowna, in the Okanagan region of British Columbia.

== Career ==
Hall has earned recognition for her landscape paintings, often using a panoramic format. A 2001 review in the Calgary Herald wrote that Hall's work appears to explore "the representation of male and female in nature and culture".

Hall's work has been featured in group exhibitions since 1969 in such galleries as the Mendel Art Gallery in Saskatoon, Saskatchewan (1976); the Agnes Etherington Art Centre in Kingston, Ontario (1977); and the Whyte Museum in Banff, Alberta (1979). Hall's first solo exhibition was held at the Off Centre Centre in Calgary in 1981. The exhibit featured paintings of male nudes.

In 2000, Hall was elected to membership in the Royal Canadian Academy of Arts. In 2010, Patricia Ainsley curated for the Kelowna Art Gallery in British Columbia a 40-year retrospective exhibition of her work, titled Surreal, Real, Ideal: The Art of Joice M. Hall.

Hall was in Gwaii Haanas for the Artists in Gwaii Haanas Residency Program in 2016, a two week residency held in Gwaii Haanas by the Haida Gwaii Museum and Parks Canada. In 2017 there was an exhibition titled, Artists in Gwaii Haanas, at the Haida Gwaii Museum of the work created by the 3 artists in the 2016 residency. In 2018 she had an exhibition at the Kelowna Art Gallery of her large painting installation inspired by that residency. The exhibition was titled GWAII HAANAS:Islands and Sacred Sites.

In 2024, Wallace Galleries in Calgary held a show of 15 of her paintings titled Joice M. Hall - Nocturnal Light.

== Selected public commissions ==
- 1978: Alberta Panorama, Government of Canada Building;
- 1982: Floral Landscape #3, Foothills Hospital, Calgary;

== Selected public collections ==
- Alberta Art Foundation, Edmonton;
- Canada Council Art Bank;
- Glenbow Museum, Calgary;
- Illingworth Kerr Gallery, Alberta College of Art and Design, Calgary;
- Remai Modern, Saskatoon;
- University of Calgary;
- University of Lethbridge;
