= Alexandra Haeseker =

Canadian painter, printmaker and installation artist (born 1945)

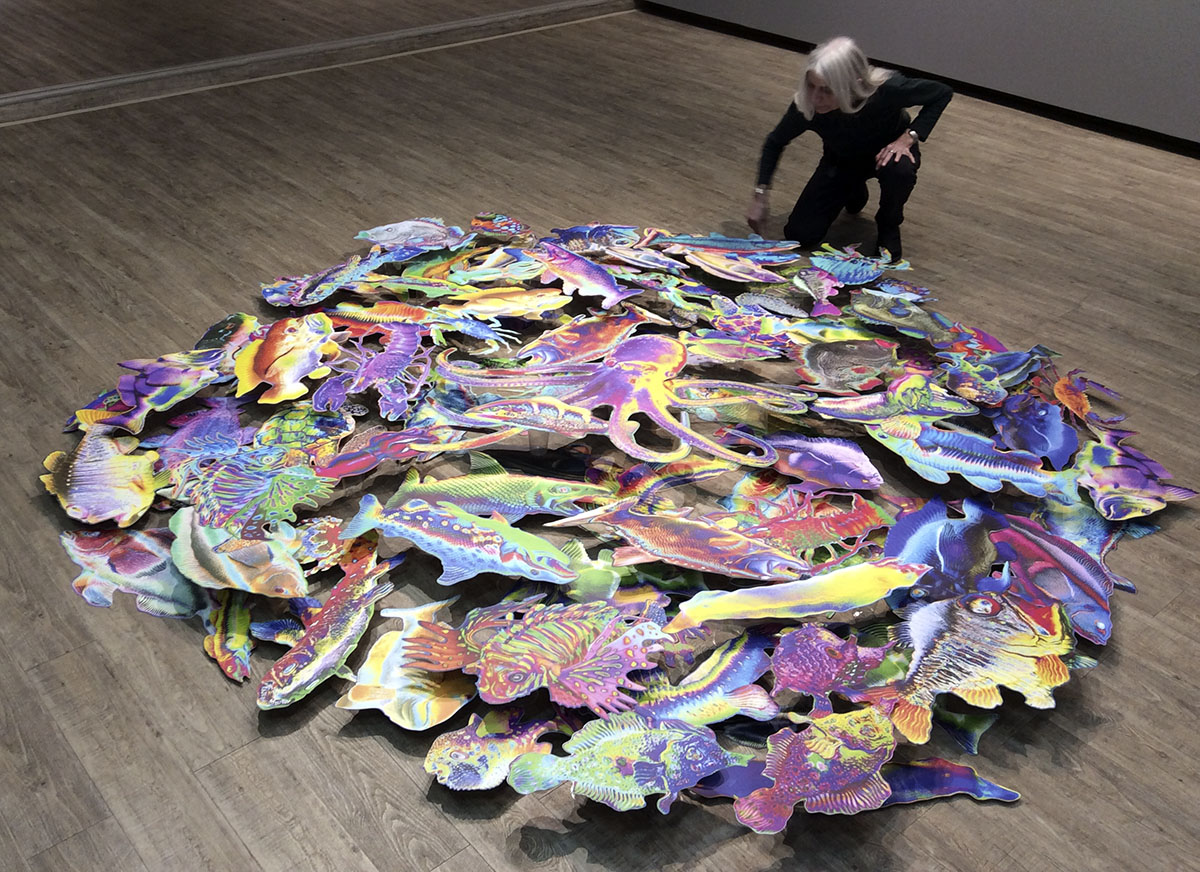
- Haeseker with her work Red Tide (2017). The Ardel Gallery of Modern Art, Bangkok, Thailand.
- Born: Alexandra Haeseker; 1945 (age 80–81); Breda, Netherlands
- Education: University of Calgary; Alberta University of the Arts
- Known for: Painter, graphic artist, installation artist
- Partner: Derek Michael Besant
- Elected: Member in 2004, Royal Canadian Academy of Arts

Alexandra Haeseker RCA (born 1945) is a Canadian painter, print maker, and installation artist, based in Calgary, Alberta. She is a professor emerita at Alberta University of the Arts. Her works can be found in public collections in Canada and internationally.

== Biography ==
Haeseker was born in Breda, Netherlands, in 1945 and moved to Calgary, Alberta, Canada with her family in 1955. She studied painting at the University of Calgary, earning bachelor's (1966) and master's (1972) degrees. She earned a diploma in fine arts from Alberta College of Art (now Alberta University of the Arts) in 1968. Haseker taught painting, drawing, and watercolor at the Alberta College of Art from 1973 to 2003. She was awarded professor emeritus status in 2004.

Haeseker was in her early years a print maker and painter in acrylic and watercolour. She also made three-dimensional painted constructions in a representational style. She used images found in family archives and her own photographs in collage. In the 1970s and 1980s, she became known for paintings of dogs, and from the mid-1980s, of behind-the-scenes at dog shows, based upon her involvement in such shows, along with other themes that evolved from her experiences with dogs.

In the 1980s, influenced by Edweard Muybridge's studies of a young amputee, she used the image of a legless boy hovering over a landscape in which dogs were tethered. The figures emerged as realistic fragments suspended in semi-abstract space. These figurative images sometimes were considered puzzling but such images developed steadily and with a personal form and content. In 1992, a retrospective titled Alexandra Haeseker: Twenty Years was held at the Illingworth Kerr Gallery, Alberta University.

In 2021, a detail of a work by Haeseker was included in chapter five, Specimens from Another Time, in Future Possible: an Art History of Newfoundland and Labrador, by Mireille Eagan and other authors, published by The Rooms Corporation and Goose Lane editions, New Brunswick. The work was inspired by a visiting artist residency at Memorial University by Haeseker in 1978.

== Commissions and installations ==
Haeseker has had several large commissions. The city of Calgary Business Revitalization Zone commissioned her mural Big Catch in 1990, located at 17th Avenue at Mount Royal Village. Her brightly coloured mural, West Ride Story (2004), is at the Calgary International Airport. She also created outdoor installations such as Spinner in Quebec at the Foundation Derouin in 2005 with the title The Library of The PreCambrian. In 2009, she was commissioned to create The Dark, an outdoor installation, by the Danish Arts Council in Denmark and in 2013, she was commissioned for the Savage Trailhead Mural by the Edmonton Arts Council, Alberta Canada as well as by the City of Airdrie Alberta, for the Genesis Place Sports Complex murals in 2017. In 2018, she created THEM for the city of Public Art Calgary Transit, BRT Stations, which showed 20 wild creatures found near urban centres in larger-than-life installations on metal utility boxes.

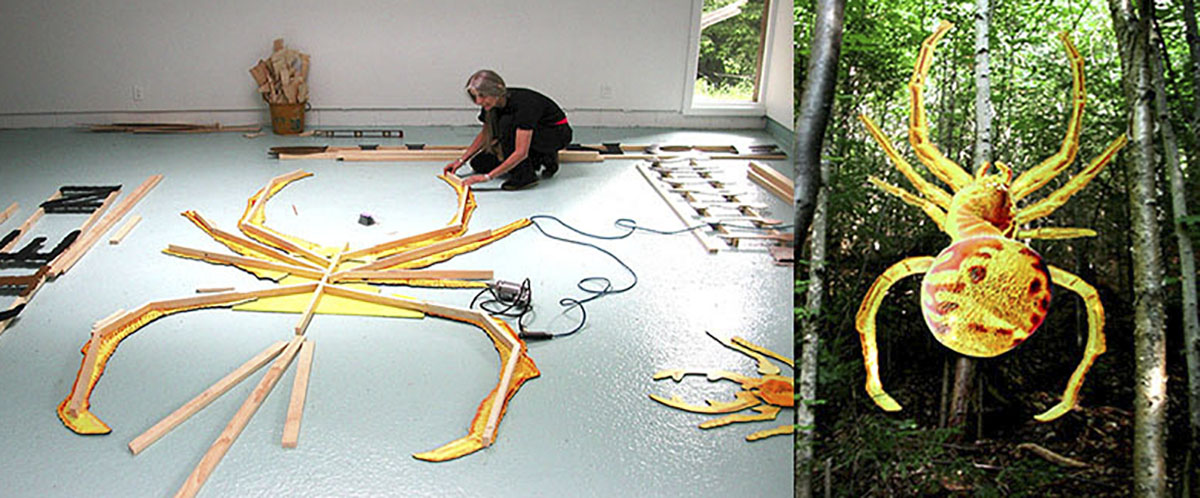
Haeseker working on her piece Spinner (2005; left). The public art installation created for Fondation Derouin in Val-David, Québec, Canada (right).

Haeseker began making her experimental prints and installations for a show at the Shanghai Art Museum, China in 2008. Her exhibitions of these works has been numerous and varied. They sometimes involve her researching Swarm behaviour in which she is deeply interested or the relationship of the exhibiting venue's site with the geography and ecology of the surrounding area, thus demonstrating her knowledge and concern for the eco-system in huge, brightly-colored experimental print installations. At other times, she creates installations that concern the area's collective past or future or even are something of a self-portrait.

To create her installations, Haeseker combines traditional methods and the latest adaptations of technology, teaming with one of her longtime Corporate partnerships, The PattisonOutdoor Group (Canada's largest billboard company). She experiments with continual developing ink technologies, recycled material, and hybrid methods to construct experiences for museum settings and public art projects.

In 2008, for the show at the Shanghai Art Museum, she was invited to represent Canada in Another Voice: We: International Woman Artists Exhibition:另一種聲音: 我們: 國際女性藝術展, a show of 12 international women artists (the first exhibition that the Shanghai Art Museum had ever undertaken for the art of gender) for which she created I Am in Your Blood, a wall installation (her first) depicting 125 women, with a black and white layer of figures with text fragments based upon emotional identity or employment roles in the workplace. The installation became part of the Shanghai Art Museum collection. Other versions of it reside in the collections of museums such as the Alberta Foundation of the Arts, Edmonton; La Boverie Musée, Liège, Belgium; and the Kunsterhaüs Museum, Vienna. (In 2010, she had a solo exhibition, a version of the Shanghai concept in Belgrade, Serbia at The Akademija Centar for Graphic Research. In 2011, with the female figures from Shanghai, she won the Second Prix at the 8th International Biennial in Belgium.)

In 2009, she was invited to show new work for The Otpechatki International Triennial of Visual Arts, Petrozavodsk, Russia. The theme was the White Sea. Art & Science. (The White Sea which is near the Arctic Circle.) Again, a select number of international artists were invited to work with researchers exploring the White Sea. She chose Ichthyology and produced imagery drawn from deep sea lifeforms that were fitted to the windows of the Russian Academy of Science (where fish fossils are displayed).

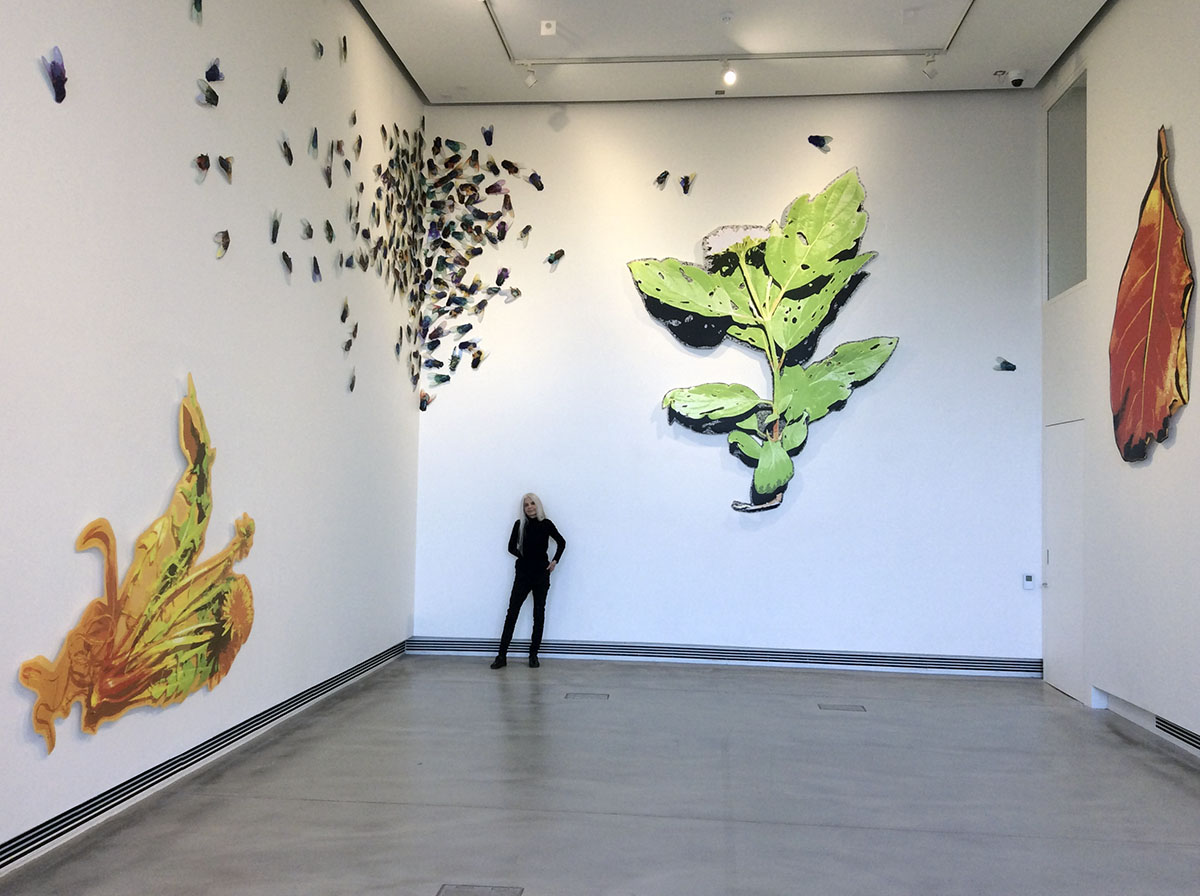
Haeseker with her work Botanist's Daughter (2020). EP Castle Millworks, Edinburgh, Scotland.

In 2009, Haeseker also participated in Pendulum/ Pendula with her long-time friend and colleague John Hall, a show of collaborative realistic paintings which they had done both in Canada and Mexico from 1992 to 1998. Each painted half of the canvas and used Mexican street trinkets and other images drawn from that part of the world. The exhibition of these paintings was seen in many public galleries – four in Mexico and four in British Columbia.

== Exhibitions ==
She has had numerous shows in Canada at the Glenbow Museum in Calgary and in other places, such as at the International Biennial Contemporaine, Trois-Rivières, Quebec in 2013.

Some of the international exhibitions in which she participated are as follows: Center for Book Arts (New York; 2013); Brighton Phoenix Contemporary Art Centre (Brighton, UK; 2013); The MODEM Museum of Contemporary Art (Hungary; 2013); the Centro de Arte Moderno (Madrid; Spain, 2014); Musée des Beaux-Arts (Liège, Belgium; 2015); The Elisabeth Anna-Palais (Oldenburg; Germany, 2015); The Lamego Art Museum (Lamego; Portugal, 2016); the Ardel Museum (Bangkok; Thailand, 2017); and The Taoxichuan Art Museum (Jingdezhen, China, 2018). In 2019, as well, her work, Dogwalk: the Dunes (1980), was included in REBELLIOUS/ Alberta Women Artists in the 1980s (Art Gallery of Alberta, Edmonton).

In 2020, at the Edinburgh Printmakers at Castle Mills Contemporary in Scotland, she installed The Botanist's Daughter, large experimental print works which looked at nature close-up and took inspiration from the resources of hand-pulled engravings found in Museum and Library collections, illustrating botanical and entomological themes. A Studio International review called the resulting effect "eerie, threatening, and yet somehow moving." The Scotsman called it a "very striking installation." As Alexandra Haeseker wrote the "disturbing nature of the everyday lurks in my work".

Anthem: Expressions of Canadian Identity, a catalogue published for a show curated by Derek Michael Besant which premiered at The Bibliotheca Alexandrina in Egypt in 2022 and opened in 2023 at the Canadian Language Museum in Toronto, included her work. In 2022, the Vernon Public Art Gallery held her exhibition Fleurs du Mal: Alexandra Haeseker, which as in her Edinburgh Printmakers show, recorded her concern about the environment through large-scale images of the insect and plant world, with an added video and artist's books. In 2023, she exhibited Wingspan, 3 outdoor sculptures in Ephemera 2023 in the Northern Australia Festival of the Arts, Queensland.

== Public collections ==
- Alberta Art Foundation, Edmonton
- Bibliotheca Alexandrina, Egypt
- Canada Council Art Bank
- Edmonton Art Gallery
- Glenbow Museum, Calgary
- Montreal Museum of Fine Arts
- Museum of Modern Art, Seoul
- National Art Gallery, Varna, Bulgaria
- Shanghai Art Museum, China
- Queensland College of Art Gallery, Australia.

Her work is included in many other galleries and museums.
