= Old Women's Buffalo Jump =

Historic site in Alberta, Canada

Coordinates: 50°28′50″N 113°53′37″W

- Aakíípisskan (Blackfoot)
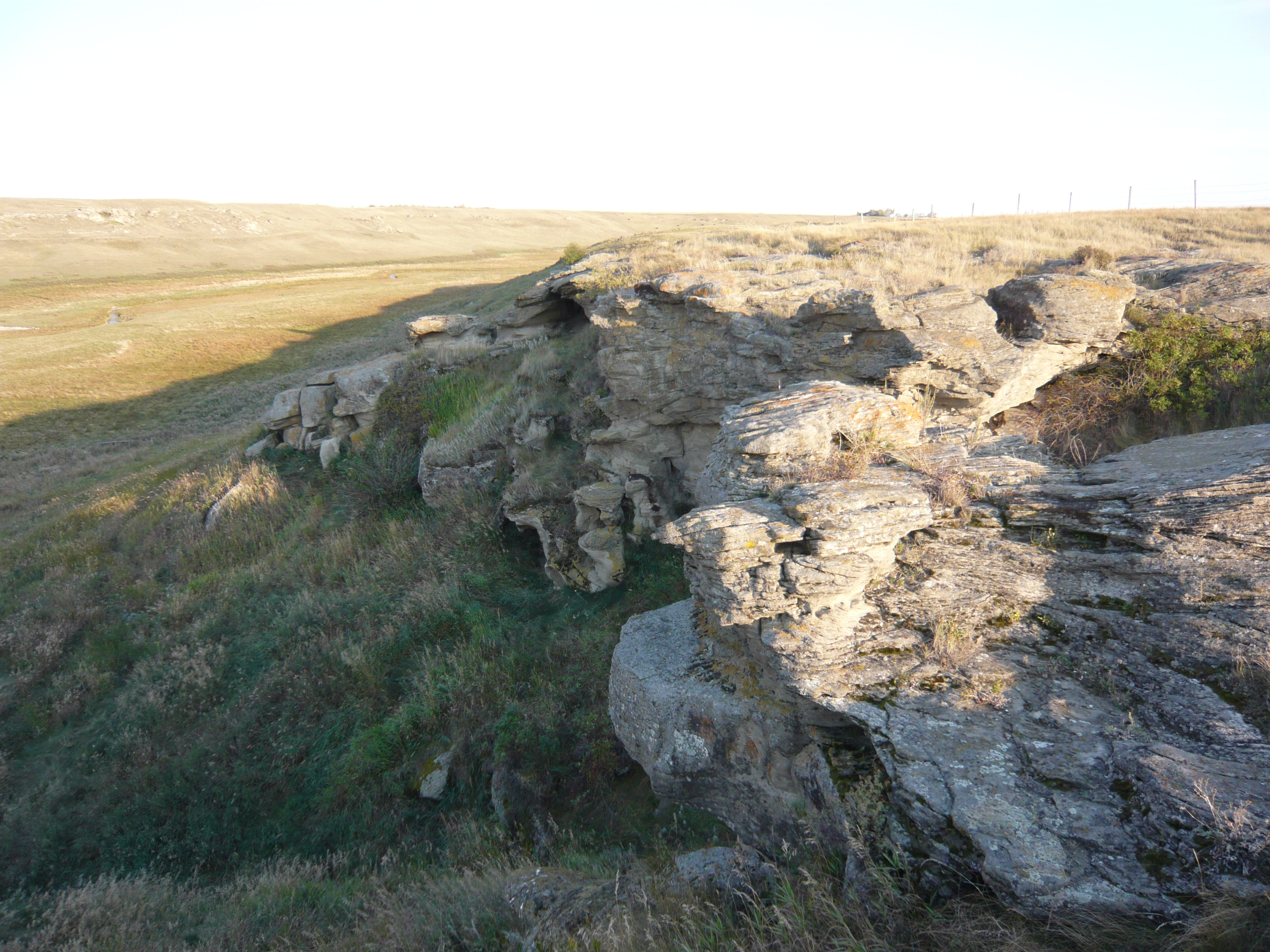
- A photo of Old Woman's Buffalo Jump, an aboriginal bison drive near Cayley, Alberta. It is a National Historic Site of Canada

- Location within Alberta
- Location: near Cayley, Alberta

National Historic Site of Canada
- Designated: May 30, 1960

Alberta Historic Resources Act
- Designated: October 15, 1979

Old Women's Buffalo Jump is a historic site and former aboriginal buffalo jump near present-day Cayley, Alberta. It is known by the Blackfoot name Aakíípisskan.

== History ==
The cliff is believed to have been in use as a buffalo jump for approximately 2000 years, up to the late 1790s. It was used repeatedly as a site for hunting buffalo by stampeding them over a cliff. Archeological remains at the site show a build up of evidence at least six metres deep at the base of the cliff. The jump itself consists of Paskapoo sandstone cliffs.

The site is significant in Blackfoot mythology as the origin location for the story of the first marriage between men and women, with the deity Napi as a key figure.

== Designation as historic site ==
Old Women's Buffalo Jump was remembered in 1952 after the base of the cliff was eroded by flash flood, revealing remains of a buffalo jump. The site was recognized as a national historic site of Canada in 1960 because of its importance as an example of a buffalo jump. Official designation of the site includes 3.3 hectares around the jump, as well as the archeological remains at the site.

== Archeological excavation ==
The first archeological excavation at Old Women's Buffalo Jump was conducted by Richard Forbis in 1958–1959, in conjunction with the Glenbow Foundation. In the first year, work at the site was directed by David H. Quapp and D. R. King, and in the second year by Tyler Bastien and D. R. King. This excavation revealed stone tools and arrowheads that had previously been undisturbed, and that give evidence to use of the site at various times back to at least 100 CE, and possibly as early as 1000 BC. Many types of arrowheads were found, including Besant, Washita, Pekisko, Paskapoo and Nanton points. The site also includes pottery, beads, and shells.
