= Mike Robinson (Alberta politician) =

Canadian museum administrator and politician

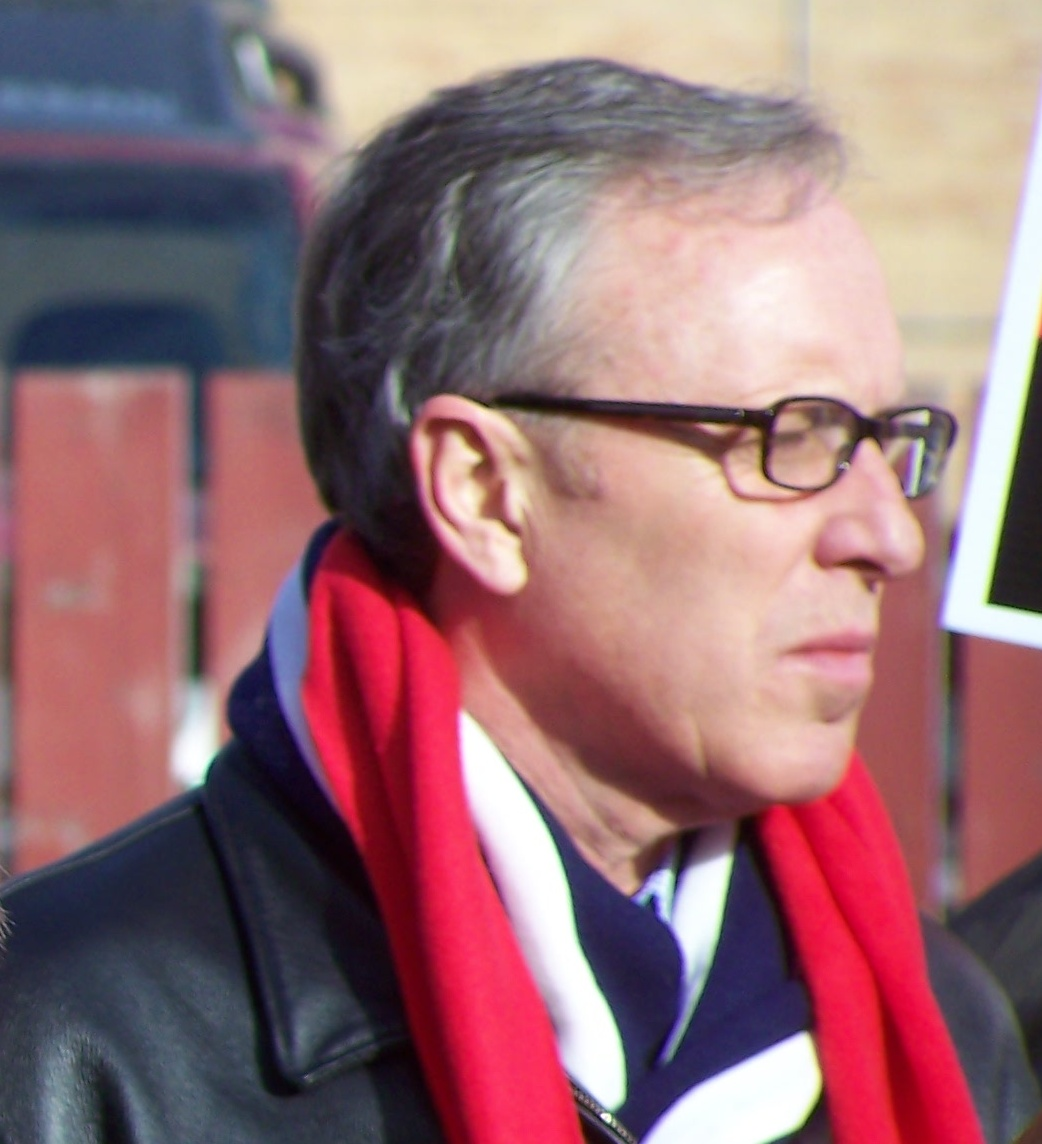
Mike Robinson (2008)

Mike Robinson, CM is the former president and CEO of Glenbow Museum in Calgary, Alberta, Canada.

From 1979 to 1986, Robinson worked in the Calgary oil patch for Petro-Canada and Polar Gas as one of the first generation of environmental and social impact assessment professionals. From there, he went to the University of Calgary and the Arctic Institute of North America. In 2000, Robinson became the president and chief executive officer of Glenbow Museum, Canada's largest non-governmental museum.

Robinson worked with Friends of the Earth Canada, the Canadian Polar Commission, the Alberta Rhodes Scholarship Selection Committee, imagineCALGARY, the Calgary Olympic Plaza Cultural District and the Royal Canadian Geographical Society. He has served on the board of the David Suzuki Foundation and is a founding board member of the Alberta Natural Capital Association.

In 2004, Robinson was awarded the Order of Canada. The award recognizes outstanding achievement, dedication to the community and service to the nation. Robinson also received the 1998 Prix Weaver-Tremblay Award for exceptional contributions to Canadian applied anthropology and was a British Columbia Rhodes Scholar in 1973.

Robinson is a frequent contributor to television and radio programs, including CBC's Wildrose Country. During his time at Glenbow, Robinson also wrote regular editorials for the Calgary Herald.He retired from that job in December 2007 and ran unsuccessfully for the Alberta Liberal Party in Calgary Foothills in the 2008 Alberta general election. Robinson was labeled by some as a "star candidate" for the Alberta Liberal Party in a key electoral district in Calgary.
