= Damian Moppett =

Canadian artist (born 1969)

- Born: 1969; Calgary, Alberta
- Education: BFA, Emily Carr College of Art and Design (now University) (graduated 1992); MFA, Concordia University (graduated 1995)
- Known for: multidisciplinary artist

Damian Moppett (born 1969), is an artist whose practice spans sculpture, painting, drawing, photography and video and who often uses one medium as the starting-point for another. In a similar way, he uses movements in art history or what are for him, iconic sculptures which he wants "to fold into his work", such as Anthony Caro's Early One Morning (1962) or an artist he considers his alter ego Hollis Frampton. He has been a Vancouver resident since 1990.

== Career ==
Moppett was born in Calgary. His mother is Carroll Moppett (now Taylor-Lindoe) and his father is Ron Moppett, artists who taught him painting and drawing. He received his BFA at the Emily Carr College of Art and Design (now University) (graduated 1992), with artists such as Steven Shearer and Geoffrey Farmer, and an MFA from Concordia University (graduated 1995). He teaches at the Emily Carr University of Art and Design and has had residencies at the International Residences Program in the Visual Arts, SPACE, London, UK (2009) and elsewhere.

== Work ==
Damian Moppett's work is diverse with a wide range of media. In the 1990s he made photographs as art and photography is the basis for much of his work but he also finds essential the transfer process of one medium to another. Around 2017, he took a two-year break, and mostly stopped making art. On his return, he used photography as a source for paintings, selecting images from his own photographs and that of photographers such as Lee Friedlander and others. He titled his show of these works in 2021 at Catriona Jeffries Gallery, Vancouver, Damian Moppett: Vignettes. Moppett also transforms paintings or drawings into large-scale public sculptures as in Untitled Abstract Drawing in Space (2019-2020), made of stainless steel, aluminum plate, copper pipe and enamel, which is approximately 200" x 190" x 96" and hangs in the lobby of the Art Gallery of Alberta.

He said of his work in 2016:

"There`s a launching point where I`m looking at a moment or author or a specific work and then using that as a point of departure for creating something else that then uses it as a specific historical reference, or has a material connection, or is speaking to my ideas of authorship and my practice."

== Selected exhibitions ==
Moppett’s solo exhibitions include shows at the Contemporary Art Gallery, Vancouver (2005); Carleton University Art Gallery, Ottawa (2006); Temple Gallery, Tyler School of Art, Philadelphia (2007); Yvon Lambert, Paris (2007); Catriona Jeffries, Vancouver (2010); Rennie Collection at Wing Sang, Vancouver (2011); Vancouver Art Gallery Off-site (2012); Simon Fraser University Gallery, Burnaby (2014); and Catriona Jeffries, Vancouver (2021). Moppett has also been included in numerous group exhibitions at Fruitmarket Gallery, Edinburgh (2002); Power Plant Contemporary Art Gallery, Toronto (2002); Galerie Kunstbuero, Vienna (2004); White Columns, New York; Museum Van Hedendaagse Kunst Antwerpen, Antwerp (2005); Yvon Lambert, New York (2006); Witte de With, Rotterdam, the Netherlands (2006); Vancouver Art Gallery (2010); Satellite Gallery, Vancouver (2011); Art Gallery of Alberta, Edmonton (2016); the National Gallery of Canada, Ottawa (2017); and Griffin Art Projects, North Vancouver (2018). Moppett is represented by Catriona Jeffries Gallery, Vancouver.

In 2023, Catriona Jeffries Gallery held a show of Moppett's work titled Half Life of Moppett's free-standing paintings which resembled a "giant pop-up book or diorama through which viewers can wander at will".

== Selected public collections ==
Moppett's work is in such collections as the National Gallery of Canada, the Art Gallery of Alberta and MOCA.
