= Eric Harvie =

Canadian oilman, philanthropist

Eric Harvie OC, QC
- Born: Eric Lafferty Harvie; 2 April 1892; Orillia, Ontario
- Died: 11 January 1975 (age 82); Calgary, Alberta
- Education: University of Alberta (1916)
- Spouse: Dorothy Jean Southam (m. 1919)

Eric Lafferty Harvie (2 April 1892 – 11 January 1975) was a Canadian lawyer and oilman. Holding mineral rights to large tracts of land in the Edmonton area, Harvie made a fortune after the oil discoveries at Leduc in 1947 and Redwater in 1948. After 1955 Harvie devoted himself primarily to cultural and philanthropic endeavours, and was a major translator of Maya civilization. He is best remembered as the founder of the Glenbow Museum and Devonian Gardens in Calgary, which opened in 1966.

== Biography ==
=== Early life and education ===
Eric Lafferty Harvie was born on 2 April 1892 in a house at 136 Matchedash Street in Orillia, Ontario, to William Mcleod Harvie and Elizabeth Cecile "Cicely" Lafferty. Eric was the fourth of five children: Alan, Ruth, and Jean his elders, and Dane his junior. William Harvie (1856–1919) was a dentist in Orillia who served as they town mayor from 1891 to 1892, and Cicely Harvie (1859–1940) was a school teacher. Eric Harvie was a fourth-generation Canadian. His great-grandfather, John Harvey (1788–1872), had immigrated to Canada from Caldermill, Scotland, in 1832 with his wife Agnes Miller (1790–1863). The Harveys landed in Montreal and ended up settling in the Orillia area. Eric Harvie's parents married in 1883. For an unknown reason, Cicely demanded that William – whose last name at this time was spelled "Harvey" – change the spelling to "Harvie" prior to their marriage. Eric Harvie first visited Calgary in 1905, travelling with his mother to visit her siblings Janet and James Delamere Lafferty, both of whom had moved west. James was a doctor and served on Calgary's first city council, and Janet was married to the lawyer James Short. Harvie graduated high school in 1911 and entered into the Articles of Clerkship with John Thomas Mulcahy. Shortly thereafter Harvie was admitted into the Law Society of Upper Canada. Not long after joining Mulcahy, however, Harvie had decided to move to Calgary, and wrote a letter to the Law Society of Alberta asking to be admitted as a student. On 25 January 1912 Harvie was accepted. In Calgary, Harvie lived with James Lafferty and began articling at James Short's office, Short, Ross and Selwood. Harvie completed his intermediate examinations in the springs of 1913 and 1914 and his finals in the spring of 1915. On 30 June 1915, Harvie was granted his interim certificate, and received his Bachelor of Laws from the University of Alberta on 10 May 1916, in absentia. Harvie was also an officer of the 103rd Regiment (Calgary Rifles).

=== World War I ===
Following Canada's entry into the First World War on 4 August 1914, Harvie enlisted in the 15th Alberta Light Horse, a Militia unit. He later joined the Canadian Expeditionary Force and the 56th Battalion and left for training in England on 20 March 1916. By that fall Harvie was in France. On 8 October 1916 Harvie was injured in the Battle of Ancre Heights. Fighting with the 49th Battalion (Edmonton Regiment) under the command of William Antrobus Griesbach, Harvie participated in an assault on the Regina Trench in the early hours of that morning. The attack lasted most of the day and was largely unsuccessful. During the attack Harvie was injured and was forced to hide himself in shell holes until the evening, at which time stretcher bearers were able to evacuate the wounded. Harvie was sent back to England to recover, and on 1 February 1917 returned to Canada on sick leave, staying with his parents in Barrie. Fully recovered, on 2 August 1917 Harvie entered into the Royal Flying Corps Canada, training at Camp Borden and Deseronto. Following his training he was sent to Fort Worth, Texas, United States, to supervise the development of the synchronized machine gun. During his stay in Texas Harvie became friends with Vernon Castle. Following this assignment Harvie returned to Beamsville, Ontario, where he stayed, acting as a temporary captain of the 49th Battalion, until 17 December 1918, at which time he returned to Calgary and was demobilized.

=== Marriage and early career ===
In June 1918, while on leave in Hamilton Harvie met Dorothy Jean Southam, the granddaughter of newspaper publisher William Southam. Dorothy Southam (1895–1988) was born and raised in Montreal growing up at 57 Belvedere Road, and had attended finishing school in New York City. After a short courtship, Harvie asked Southam to marry him. After spending the early part of 1919 in Calgary the couple returned to Montreal where they married on 29 September 1919, and afterwards spent a two-week honeymoon at Loon Lake. Returning to Calgary following the honeymoon, the Harvies sought to establish themselves in the city, building a home at 301 36th Avenue (now Elbow Park Lane) South West. At this time Harvie became the junior partner in the firm Ford, Miller and Harvie, with partners Clinton Ford and Leo Miller.

Harvie's law practice flourished throughout the 1920s and 1930s, as he built an extensive clientele. This clientele included many oil companies, as well as wealthy businessmen such as Chester de la Verge, who was living in Calgary, and Errett Cord, who was hunting for oil in Alberta. In 1935 Harvie left his partners and formed his own practice, and from 1936 to 1939 had Ted Manning as a partner. Later in 1939 Harvie took on George Crawford as a partner, and then in 1940 Ted Arnold, at which time the firm became known as Harvie, Arnold and Crawford, which it would remain until Harvie's retirement from law.

From a young age Harvey developed a keen interest in oil exploration. The young law student had been living in Calgary for two years when the Dingman No. 1 gas well blew in Turner Valley on 14 May 1914, starting Calgary's first boom period. Upon establishing his law practice in 1920, Harvie became active in the oil and gas business as well, being involved with numerous exploration ventures, most of which were unsuccessful. Between 1925 and 1933 Harvie served as the director of W. S. Herron's Okalta Oils, and in 1933 he became the solicitor for the British American Oil Company's ventures in Turner Valley. British American and Harvie were both involved in the financing of the Royalite No. 1 well, which blew in on 16 June 1936, becoming Alberta's first major oil discovery.

=== Leduc discovery ===
In the summer of 1941 Harvie purchased for $2,840.64 the mineral rights to a portion of land in the Edmonton area. The mineral rights had been owned by Anglo-Western Oils, a subsidiary of the British Dominion Land Settlement Corporation, and both companies had been bankrupted and needed to sell off the rights. In 1943, Harvie purchased the rights to the remaining portion for $10,000. The area totalled 487,967.99 acres (1,974.7364 km^{2}). Harvie was initially nervous about the investment and concluded that he would have to make $100,000 for the investment to pay off after taxes. Although he initially used the rights to extract gravel, in 1946 he leased oil rights to Shell Oil Company, with an option for three additional years. Shell's seismographs did not detect oil, and the company backed out after a year. In 1947, Harvie leased oil rights on a portion of land to the Imperial Oil Company, with a five-year option. On 13 February 1947 Imperial's Leduc No. 1 blew in, tapping into a large Devonian reef. Harvie became a millionaire overnight. A year later Harvie leased oil rights in the Redwater region to a consortium of companies – Barnsdall Oil Company, Honolulu Oil Corporation, Seaboard Oil Company, and Los Nietos Company – going by the name of the Barnsdall Group. In September 1948 Barnsdall's "Discovery Well" in Redwater blew in, tapping into another Devonian field, making it the second major strike on Harvie's land.

In 1949 Harvie retired from law and dedicated his time exclusively to oil. Following the Leduc and Redwater discoveries he remained active in the oil business for several years. His company, Western Leaseholds, went public in 1951, and in 1955 Harvie sold his control of the company to Petrofina for the price of $20,000,000. In the ensuing years Harvie continued to explore for oil with his company Western Minerals.

Harvie continued his association with the military as first the honorary lieutenant-colonel, and later honorary colonel, of the Calgary Highlanders from 1948 to 1962.

=== Philanthropy and the Glenbow ===
Following the sale of Western Leaseholds in 1955, Harvie dedicated increasing time to his collecting hobby, which he had had since a young age. Now able to travel, Harvie acquired an eclectic array of antiquities from across the world. In 1964 he first displayed his collection in the temporary location of Calgary's "second" courthouse. In 1966 he officially founded the Glenbow Alberta Institute with an endowment of over $10 million. Although the museum has objects from a wide range of cultures, its primary focus is Western-Canadian culture and heritage. Harvie joked that he wanted to die broke, and thus turned the majority of his wealth back to the province in the form of gifts. Other projects paid for by Harvie's Devonian Foundation include the Confederation Centre of the Arts, Maritime Museum of the Atlantic, Devonian Gardens, and the Buffalo Nations Luxton Museum. In 1962 Harvie was made an honorary chief of the Blackfoot Nation, and in 1967 he was made an officer of the Order of Canada.

=== Personal life ===
Harvie lived in Calgary until his death in 1975. He and his wife Dorothy had three children: Joy (1922–2014), Donald (1924–2001), and Neil (1929–1999). In 1934 Harvie acquired the Glenbow Ranch near Cochrane, Alberta, comprising 2,200 acres (8.9 km^{2}) of land. The ranch had belonged to his client Chester de la Vergne since 1905, and had originally been purchased by Matthew Cochrane in 1880. After de la Vergne had gotten into financial trouble following the Wall Street crash of 1929, a deal was worked out that saw the land turned over to Harvie. The Harvie family spent extensive time at the ranch, which was eventually taken over by Neil. Eric Harvie died on 11 January 1975 at the age of 82. Harvie's papers are held at the Glenbow Museum as the Eric Harvie fonds.

== Bibliography ==
- Diehl, Fred M. (1989). A Gentleman from a Fading Age: Eric Lafferty Harvie. Calgary: Devonian Foundation. ISBN 978-0-919869-02-8.
