= Glenbow Museum =

Art and history museum in Calgary, Canada

The Glenbow Museum
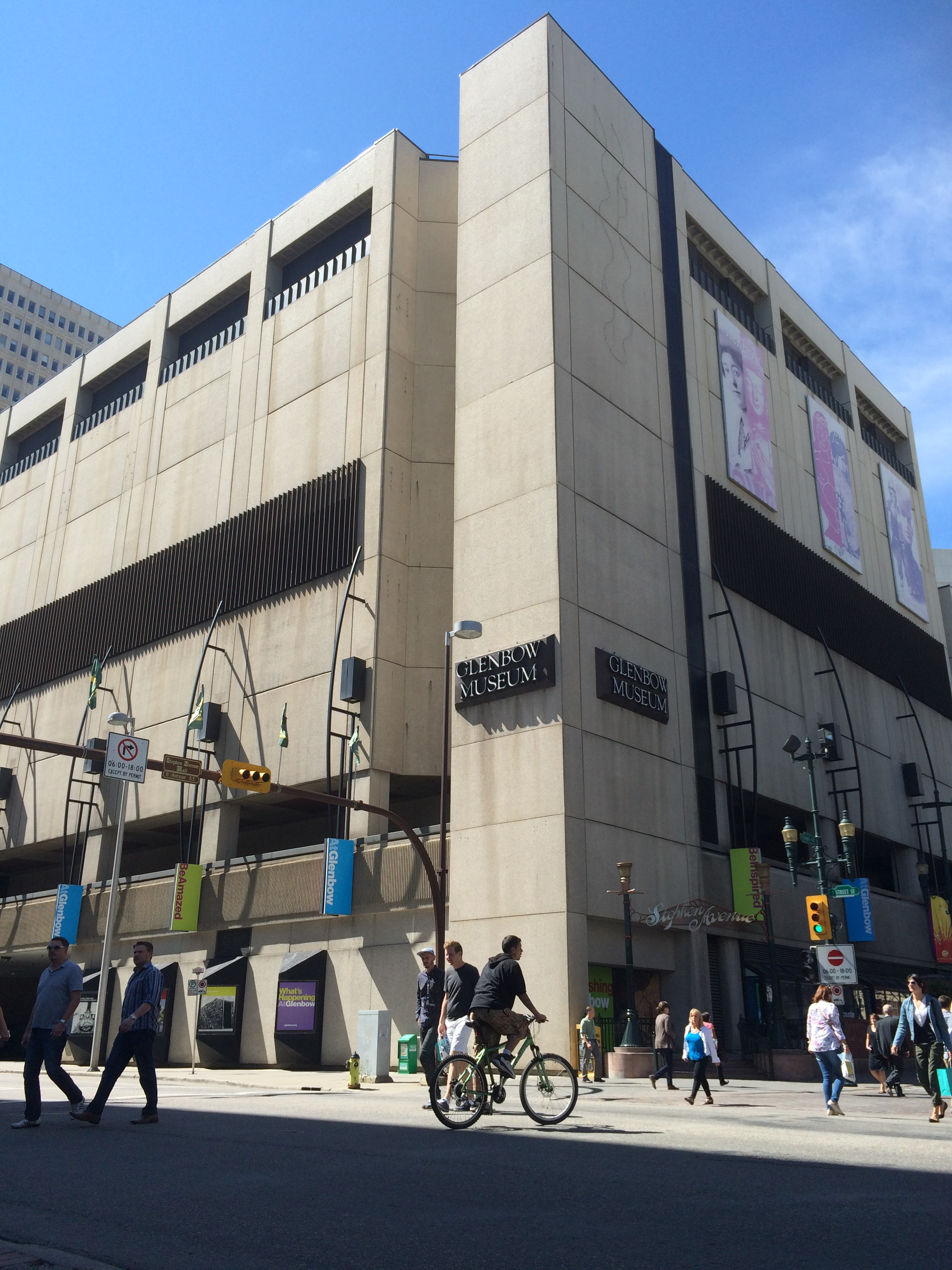
- Established: 1966
- Location: Calgary, Alberta, Canada
- Coordinates: 51°2′41.92″N 114°3′40.08″W
- Type: Anthropology, art, history, mineralogy
- Visitors: 148,668 (2019)
- Founder: Eric Lafferty Harvie
- Director: Nicholas R. Bell
- Public transit access: City Hall C-Train station
- Website: www.glenbow.org

The Glenbow Museum is an art and history regional museum in the city of Calgary, Alberta, Canada. The museum focuses on Western Canadian history and culture, including Indigenous perspectives. The Glenbow was established as a private non-profit foundation in 1955 by lawyer, businessman and philanthropist Eric Lafferty Harvie with materials from his personal collection.

The museum moved to a facility in downtown Calgary in 1976, and is funded by the governments of Calgary, Alberta, and Canada, private donors, as well as an endowment provided by Harvie. In 2019, the Glenbow had a total of 148,668 visitors. The museum closed for renovations in 2021 and is scheduled to re-open in 2027.

Admission to the museum is free as of February 2022, due to a $25 million donation by the Shaw Family Foundation. $15 million of the donation was placed in an endowment fund for admissions, and $10 million is earmarked for the new JR Shaw Institute for Canadian Art.

== History ==
=== Early history ===
The Glenbow Museum's origin begins with Alberta lawyer and businessman Eric Lafferty Harvie. Harvie was active in the oil and gas industry in the 1920s–30s serving as director of the W. S. Herron's Okaita Oils, and solicitor for British-American Oil's operations in Turner Valley. Beginning in 1941, Harvie purchased mineral rights in the Edmonton region and leased the rights to the Imperial Oil Company which drilled Leduc No. 1, a major oil discovery. Harvie became a millionaire overnight, and after other strikes on his mineral rights in Redwater, Harvie's fortune continued to grow.

Harvie founded the Glenbow Foundation, named after Harvie's ranch and the Canadian Pacific Railway station 1.9 miles east of Cochrane, in 1955 with the goal of promoting a better understanding of the history and heritage of Western Canada, primarily through collecting and preserving art, documents and artifacts. The original goal of the organization was to collect artifacts and rely on partnerships and other museums to exhibit the collection. The foundation was headquartered in the William Roper Hull Ranche House, the former home of prominent businessman and meatpacker William Roper Hull. The early foundation consisted of a library, archives, art collection, Historical research division and the Luxton Museum in Banff, but later expanded to include photography, archaeology, ethnology and a museum division. As the Foundation, the institution funded archeological projects including that of Richard Forbis in 1958–59 at Old Women's Buffalo Jump.

Harvie sought to collect elements of Western Canadian culture and history, which were not highly sought after at the time, allowing the collection to grow quickly with donations deemed by their owners to be "junk", and low cost purchases for the foundation. The foundation's collection quickly outgrew the Hull Ranche House, and collections were moved offsite, including the archaeology division to the University of Calgary when the school founded an archaeology department. Harvie was especially interested in collecting artifacts from Indigenous peoples of North America, which was reflected in his choice of first director of the foundation Douglas Leechman. While the foundation focused on collecting Western Canadian artifacts, Harvie continued to collect artifacts that interested him from all around the world, leading to the foundation to describe two types of collections, Canadiana and Harvieana. After meeting German-American wildlife artist Carl Rungius, Harvie sought to acquire as many of his works as he could, purchasing his entire studio in Banff, and sending employees to New York to purchase any other works they could find, eventually reaching a size of 2,600 works by Rungius. Harvie used his fortune to commission works and bring artists to Alberta from across the world, including John Gilroy and Pilkington Jackson.

=== Creating the Glenbow–Alberta Institute ===
In 1964, with the assistance of the Government of Alberta, the Glenbow Foundation - Alberta Government Museum opened with the foundation supplying the exhibits, personnel and expertise, and the Government of Alberta providing the old Calgary courthouse and maintenance costs. The courthouse was found to be too small for the foundation and the exhibits, so later in 1965 the archives and library portion of the foundation moved to the Calgary Public Library Building.

The next major milestone occurred in 1966, when Harvie, who had been experiencing health issues, donated his collection to the people of Alberta as a centennial gift. The gift was finalized when the Legislative Assembly of Alberta passed An Act to Establish the Glenbow–Alberta Institute on April 15, 1966. The new institute was operated with a volunteer board, with one-third of the board appointed by the Government of Alberta, one-third by the Devonian Foundation, and one-third elected by members of the institute. The institute was initially funded by matching $5 million donations from Harvie and the Alberta government. On March 15, 1973, the institute was vested with the responsibility of being the City of Calgary's archivists, and all records no longer required in normal civic operations were to be made available and held by the institute.

In 1973, plans were finalized for the Glenbow to construct a new CA$8.775 million facility to hold the institute's growing collection. The Government of Alberta funded most of the new centre, with the Government of Canada contributing $1.6 million, and the City of Calgary underwrote annual maintenance costs. An eight-story, 23,225-square-metre (249,990 sq ft) structure was built by the Government of Alberta across from the Calgary Tower. The building was completed and opened to the public on September 22, 1976.

During the 1980s as the price of oil dropped, the Glenbow Museum came under significant financial pressure. In 1983, the museum noted it had a $400,000 deficit and noted the museum would close in Summer 1983 if it was unable to raising the funds. Since the opening of the new building in 1976, the organization had outspent its annual endowment creating the shortfall, and lower corporate donations with the economic downturn further reduced operating funds. The Government of Alberta provided a one time grant of $150,000 to keep the library and archives open, and Albertans donated over $240,000 within a month, but the total was still short of what was necessary for the continued operation of the museum at the same level of service.

=== Modern history ===
As of 2025, the president and CEO is Nicholas R. Bell. Former presidents and CEOs include Mike Robinson and Jeff Spalding.

In 2021, the Glenbow Museum secured a total of $94 million from government sources including $40 million from each of the Government of Canada and Alberta, and $14 million from the City of Calgary to redesign and renovate the eight-story downtown space. The museum will seek an additional $40 million from private sources for the renovation. The project is set to total $115 million for capital costs, and remaining funds going towards operational costs and future programs. Construction closed the museum for three years starting on August 29, 2021. It is currently (as of June 2026) targeting a 2027 reopening.

Admission to the museum is free permanently as of February 2022, due to a $25 million donation by the Shaw Family Foundation. $15 million of the donation will be placed in an endowment fund for admissions, and $10 million is earmarked for the new JR Shaw Institute for Canadian Art, named in honor of JR Shaw, founder of Shaw Communications and Corus Entertainment.

== Archives ==
The Glenbow archives are one of Canada's largest non-governmental repositories and a major research centre for historians, writers, students, genealogists, and the media. They comprise an extremely large collection of archival records of individuals, families, organizations and businesses from Western Canada and includes 3,500 metres of textual records, over a million photographs, 350 hours of film footage, and 1,500 sound recordings. The archives range from the 1870s to the 1990s, documenting the social, political and economic history of Western Canada, particularly Calgary and southern Alberta. Areas of specialty include First Nations, Métis genealogy, the Royal Canadian Mounted Police, ranching and agriculture, the petroleum industry, politics, labour, women, and business. Unique collections in the archives include catalogs, cookbooks, records of land sales by the Canadian Pacific Railway, maps, school yearbooks, extensive genealogical resources, and an excellent collection of resources for the study of Métis genealogy.

== Art collection ==
The Glenbow's art collection comprises 33,000 works, mainly dating from the 19th century to the present, primarily historical, modern, and contemporary work from or pertaining to the northwest of North America. The collection contains a selection of landscape painting, a Canadian prints collection including works from Walter J. Phillips and modernist printmaker Sybil Andrews, First Nations and Inuit Art, American illustration, and wildlife Art. Works from other parts of the world provide a broader national and international frame of reference.

Selected works

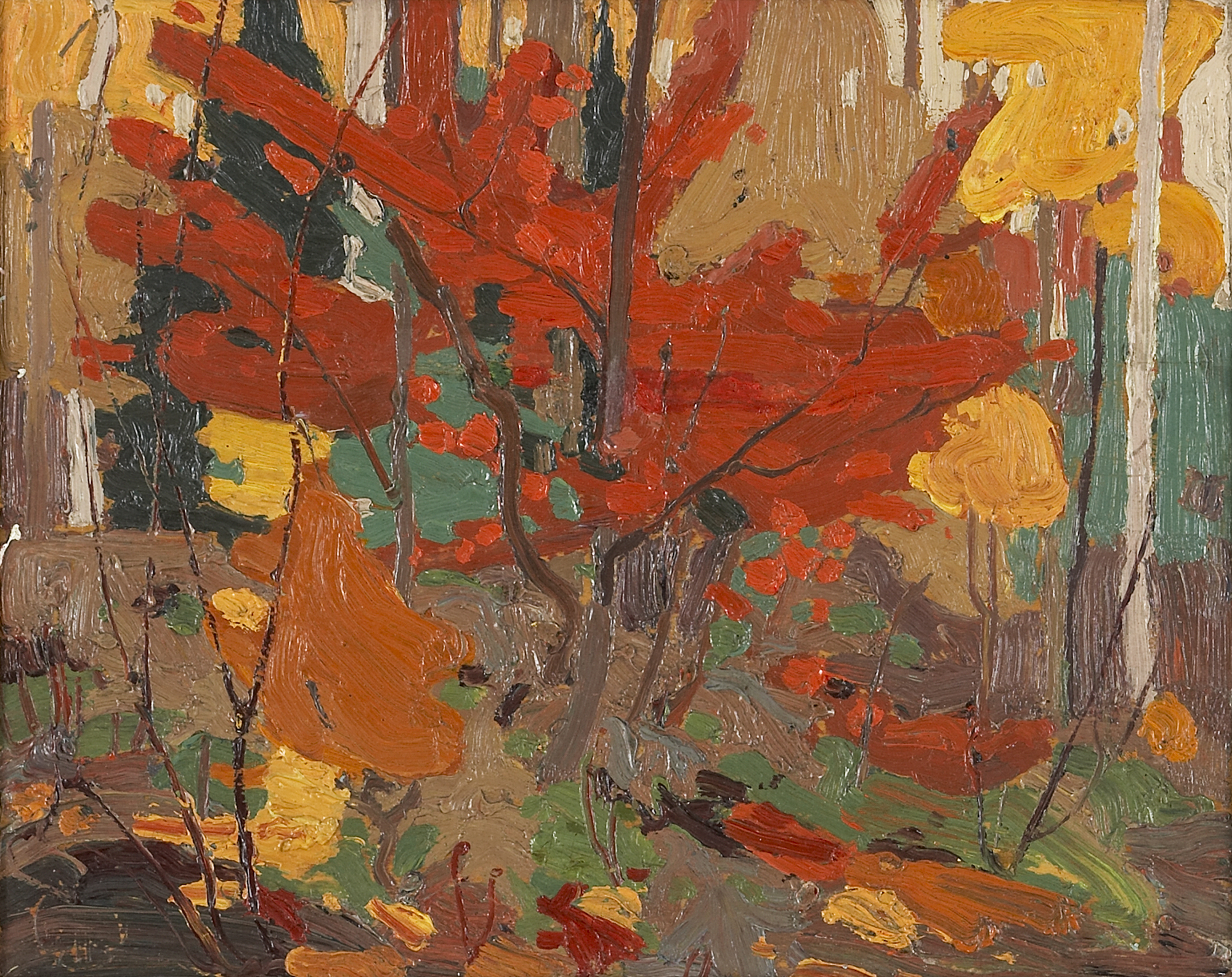
Tom Thomson, Autumn, Fall 1916

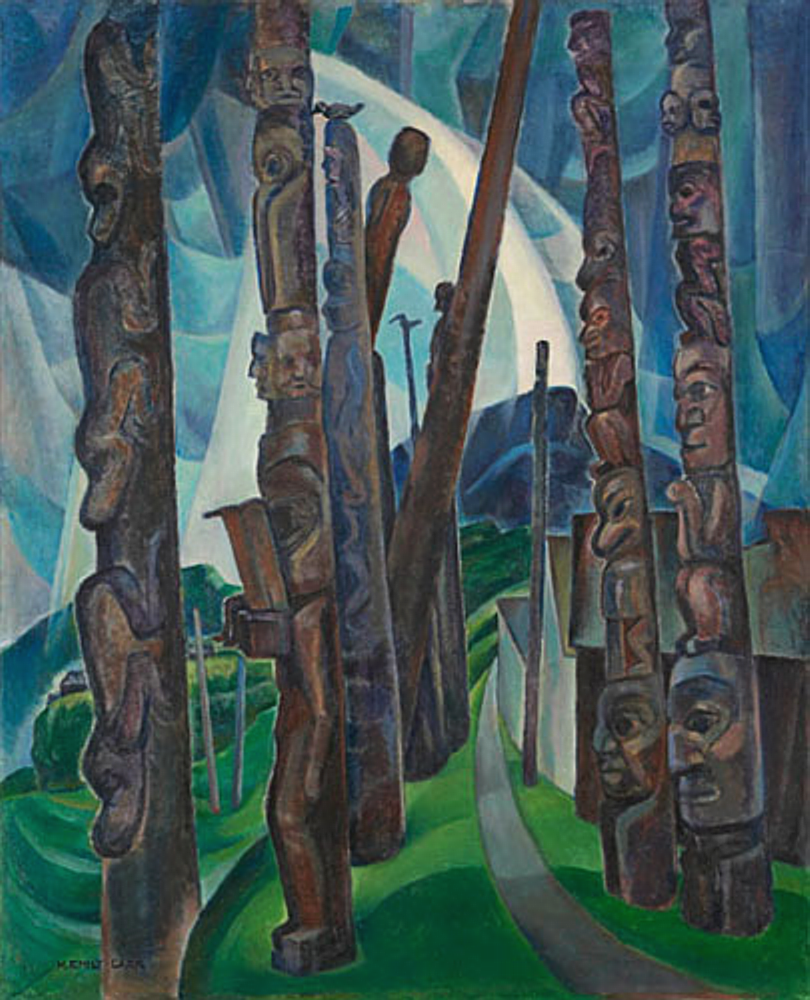
Emily Carr, Kitwancool, 1928

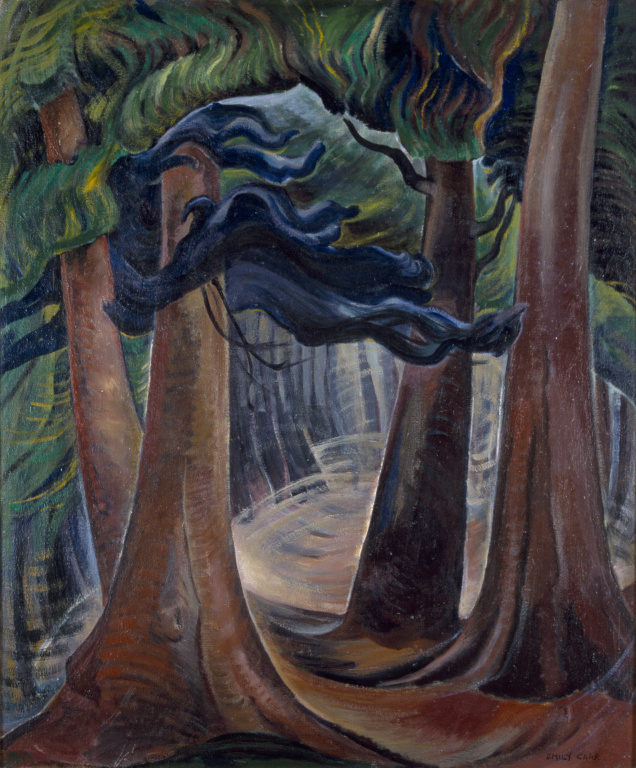
Emily Carr, Among the Firs, c. 1931

== Library ==
The Glenbow's library contains 100,000 books, periodicals, newspapers, maps, and pamphlets with relevance to Western Canada, from the time buffalo roamed the plains, to the coming of the railroad and settlement of the West, to political, economic and social events in Alberta today. The collection includes rare illustrated equestrian literature from the 15th century, school books from one-room school houses, and numerous volumes and other material related to the museum's collections of military history, ethnology, mineralogy and art.

== Museum ==
The museum's collection includes artifacts from Western Canada, and various other cultures around the world. In addition, the museum houses a collection of gems and minerals.

=== Community History ===
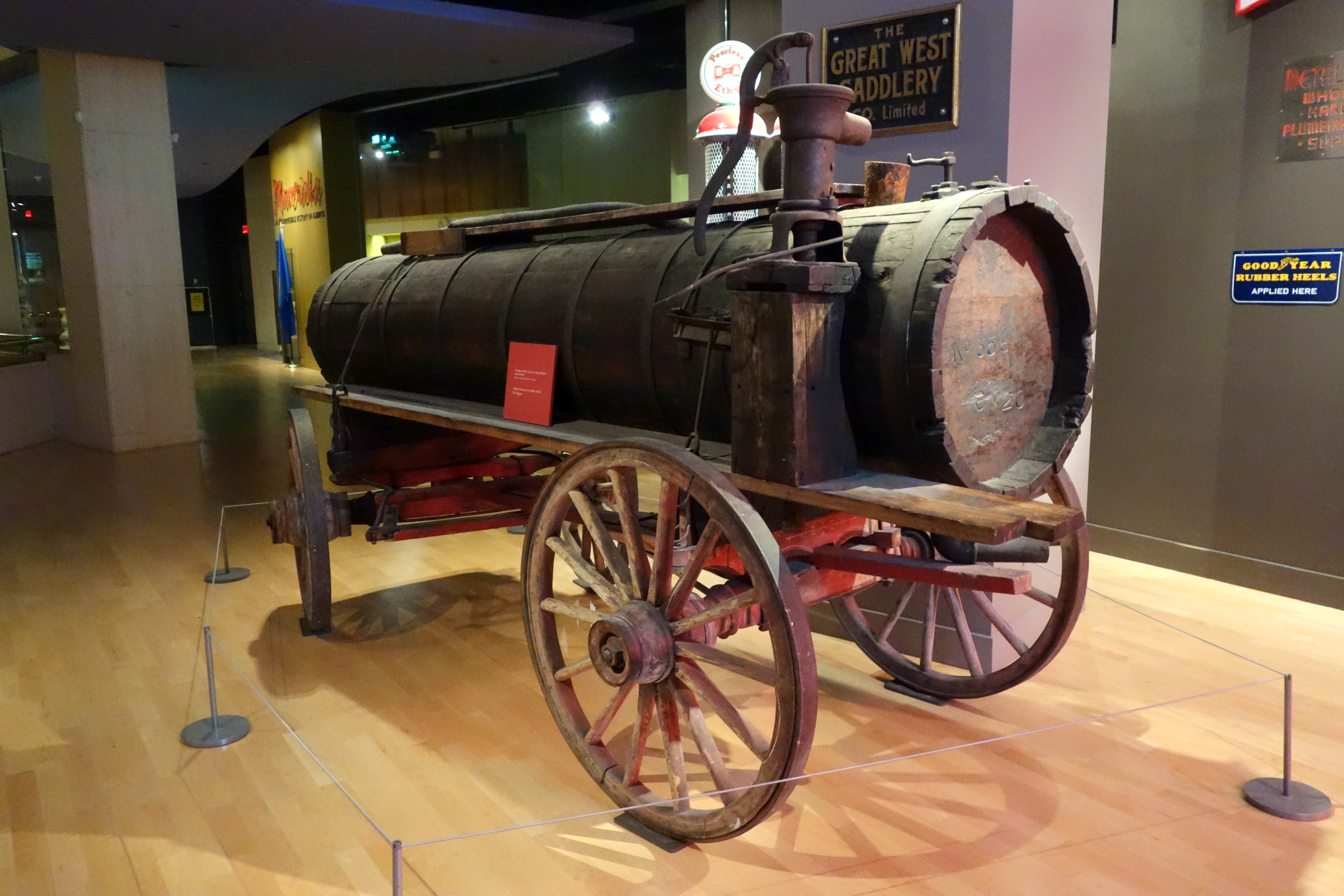
An oil wagon used at the Turner Valley oilfields, c. 1920, on display at the Glenbow Museum

The museum's Community History collection includes a number of artifacts, exploring the lives of southern Albertans from 1880 to 1970. The collection includes important holdings of Albertan pottery, Western Canadian folk studies, northern explorations, numismatics, pressed glass, and textiles. The museum sorts its Community History collection in the following manner, Community and Ceremonial Life, Daily Life, Ethnic Cultures, Leisure and Play, and Work and Industry.

The collection contains over 100,000 objects originating from many corners of the world, providing insight into the life in Western Canada from the late 19th century to the present day. Included in the Community History collection are artifacts from the Doukhobor and Hutterite communities of Western Canada, and the Calgary Stampede. The museum also holds several items from the search parties for Franklin's lost expedition.

Several items from this collection are featured in the Mavericks: An Incorrigible History of Alberta exhibition. The permanent exhibit tells the history of Alberta through the stories of 48 individuals, or "mavericks".

=== Military and Mounted Police ===
The Military and Mounted Police collection includes an extensive collection of artifacts relating to Canadian military history, with an emphasis on southern Alberta. In addition, the museum's collection also includes a number of European and Japanese armour, arms, and firearms and other weapons from around the world. The Military and Mounted Police collection has been sorted into the following categories, Arms and Armour, Canada at War, Famous People and Battles, Firearms, and Mounted Police.

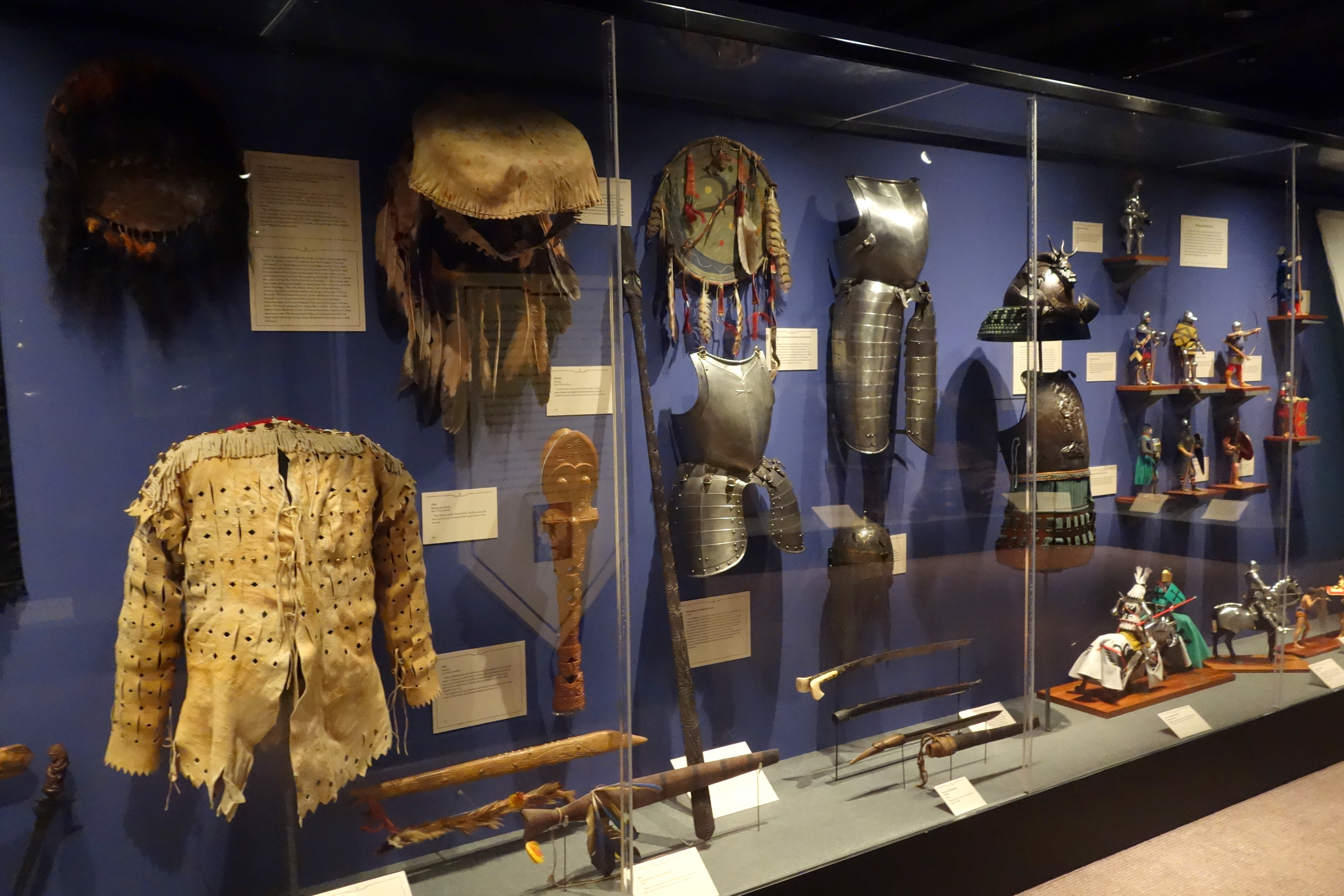
An exhibit of arms and armour from the museum's military collection

The Arms and Armour portion of the collection features a number of European and Japanese arms and armour. In particular, the museum's collection of Japanese armour and arms is the largest collection of its kind in Canada. The collection sorted under Canada at War primarily focuses on the role of Canada, and Alberta, during the North-West Rebellion, World War I, World War II, and the Korean War. The Mounted Police section includes a number of artifacts relating to the development of the North-West Mounted Police, and its successor, the Royal Canadian Mounted Police.

The Glenbow's military collection is the most diverse in Western Canada, with 26,000 items. This includes 2,100 firearms, ranging from the 16th century to present day, in the Firearms section of the Military and Mounted Police collection. Most of the artifacts from the museum's Famous People and Battles section were artifacts acquired from the Royal United Services Institute. In June 2008, the Glenbow Museum and the University of Alberta acquired a number of artifacts from Sam Steele, an officer of the North-West Mounted Police, and the commanding officer of the Strathcona's Horse in the Boer War. 60 objects from the Sam Steele collection are on display at the Glenbow Museum.

Many items from the museum's Military and Mounted Police collection are on display at the Warriors: A Global Journey Through Five Centuries exhibition. The exhibition is a permanent exhibit at the museum which compares cultural approaches to war throughout history.

=== Minerals ===
The museum's Minerals collection includes minerals and precious and semi-precious stones from around the world, particularly Western Canada. The exhibit includes minerals that glow in the dark, a display of fool's gold, a piece of the Earth's oldest rock, and rock crystals in every colour of the rainbow. Specimens were selected for exhibition value as well as mineralogical significance.

A number of items from the museum's Mineral collection may be viewed at the Treasures of the Mineral World exhibition, a permanent exhibit at the Glenbow Museum.

=== Native North America ===
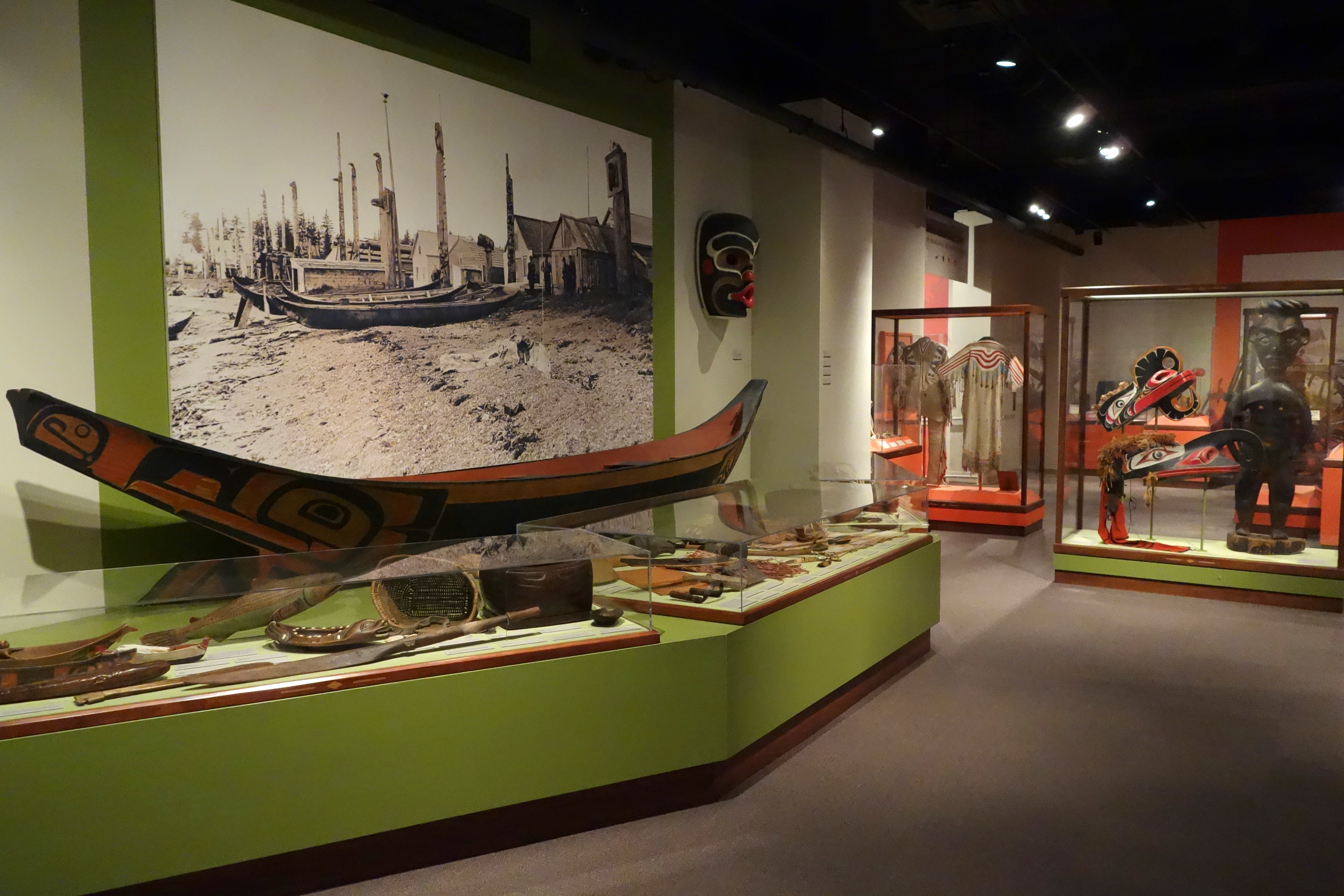
Artifacts from the indigenous peoples of North America on display at the Glenbow Museum

The Native North America collection is a large collection of artifacts from various indigenous peoples of North America, particularly the Plains Indians. The museum sorts its Community History collection in the following manner, Inuit, Métis, Northwest Coast, Plains, and Other First Peoples.

The Plains section places a particular emphasis on the indigenous peoples of the northwestern Plains, including the Anishinaabe, the Niitsitapi, Cree, and Tsuut'ina Nation. The Northwest Coast section of the Native North America collection focuses on the Indigenous peoples of the Pacific Northwest Coast, most notably the Kwakwaka'wakw, and the Nuu-chah-nulth. The Other First Peoples section includes artifacts from other Canadian First Nations groups, including the Dene, Iroqouis, and Mi'kmaq.

The Glenbow ethnology collection contains approximately 48,000 items. Niitsitapiisinni: Our Way of Life, a permanent exhibit centred around the Niitsitapi, features a number of items from the museum's Native North America collection.

=== World Cultures ===
The Glenbow Museum's collection includes a number of artifacts from around the world. Its collection is sorted into Africa, Asia, Latin America, and Oceania. The museum's African collection contains over 5,000 artifacts, most of which was acquired in the 1960s. The collection has a particular focus on West Africa, with a number of artifacts from the Akan, Bamileke, Yoruba, and the Kingdom of Bamum. The museum's Latin American collection was also acquired in the 1960s. Its collection primarily focuses on the Amazon Basin, with artifacts from the Bororo, Karajá, Tapirapé, and Urubu peoples. The museum's Oceania collection is primarily made up of artifacts from Papua New Guinea, although the collection also includes artifacts from areas throughout Oceania.

"Many Faces, Many Paths: Art of Asia" houses more than 80 statues, sculptures and other Buddhist and Hindu relics dating as far back as the first century. The Bumper Development Corporation Ltd., a private oil and gas company headquartered in Calgary, donated nearly all the pieces in this gallery, which is the museum's oldest exhibit. The Asian collection consists of Buddhist and Hindu art from Cambodia, China, India, Indonesia, Japan, Korea, Nepal, Pakistan, Thailand, and Tibet.

Where Symbols Meet: A Celebration of West African Achievement, is a permanent exhibition at Glenbow, featuring a number of items from the museum's West African collection.

== See also ==
- List of art museums
- List of museums in Alberta
