= VIVA Awards =

Visual art award

- Description: Awards for British Columbian mid-career artists
- Country: Canada (British Columbia)
- Presented by: Jack and Doris Shadbolt Foundation

The VIVA Awards are $15,000 prizes, granted annually to British Columbian mid-career artists chosen for "outstanding achievement and commitment" by the Jack and Doris Shadbolt Foundation. The awards are presented by the Shadbolt Foundation in conjunction with the Alvin Balkind Curator's Prize.

== Award winners ==
- 1988 Stan Douglas, Carel Moiseiwitsch
- 1989 Carole Itter, Neil Wedman
- 1990 Terry Ewasiuk, David Ostrem
- 1991 Persimmon Blackbridge, Gary Pearson
- 1992 Award of Honour Alvin Balkind
- 1993 Elspeth Pratt, Henry Tsang
- 1994 Mike MacDonald, Chick Rice
- 1995 Kati Campbell, Alan Storey
- 1996 Lorna Brown, Phillipe Raphanel
- 1997 Award of Honour Joan Lowndes, Ian Wallace
- 1998 Cornelia Wyngaarden, Lawrence Paul Yuxweluptun
- 1999 Myfanwy MacLeod, Judy Radul
- 2000 Haruko Okano, Jerry Pethick
- 2001 Dana Claxton, Brian Jungen
- 2002 Award of Honour Jeff Wall
- 2003 Geoffrey Farmer, Kelly Wood
- 2004 Rebecca Belmore, Ron Terada
- 2005 Hadley+Maxwell, Stephen Shearer
- 2006 Damian Moppett, Marianne Nicolson
- 2007 Luanne Martineau, Isabelle Pauwels
- 2008 Tim Lee, Kevin Schmidt
- 2009 Kathy Slade, Mark Soo
- 2010 Germaine Koh, Marina Roy
- 2011 Reece Terris, Althea Thauberger
- 2012 Beau Dick, Ron Tran
- 2013 Elizabeth McIntosh
- 2014 Skeena Reece, Mina Totino
- 2015 Elizabeth Zvonar
- 2016 Kelly Lycan, Raymond Boisjoly
- 2017 Lyse Lemieux
- 2018 Hannah Jickling and Helen Reed, Charlene Vickers
- 2019 Krista Belle Stewart
- 2020 Lucie Chan, Cindy Mochizuki, Tania Willard
- 2021 Diyan Achjadi, Samuel Roy-Bois
- 2022 Charles Campbell, Jan Wade
- 2023 Hazel Meyer, Laiwan
- 2024 Gabrielle L'Hirondelle Hill, Tʼuyʼtʼtanat-Cease Wyss
- 2025 Justine A. Chambers
