= Forge Project =

Nonprofit in New York

- Formation: 2021; 5 years ago
- Founder: Becky Gochman and Zach Feuer
- Type: Nonprofit
- Tax ID no.: EIN: 93-2518698
- Purpose: Indigenous art and culture
- Headquarters: Taghkanic, New York, United States
- Executive Director: Candice Hopkins
- Website: forgeproject.com

Forge Project is a nonprofit organization dedicated to contemporary Indigenous art and culture, located in Taghkanic, New York. Originally founded as an LLC in 2021 by a philanthropist and a former art dealer to champion Indigenous artists through purchases and financial support, the organization formally transitioned to an Indigenous-led nonprofit in 2024.

Forge Project hosts programs to support Indigenous artists and communities, including annual fellowships and on-site events. The organization also owns a lending collection of contemporary art by Indigenous artists that provides artwork to other institutions for exhibitions. Forge Project's headquarters are located in the historical homelands of a group of Mohican people, including those whose descendants formed the Stockbridge–Munsee Community, and the property features several buildings designed by the artist Ai Weiwei.

== History ==
=== Early 2020s: Development, founding, and early programs ===
Becky Gochman, an American philanthropist, art collector, and equestrian based in New York and Florida, was seeking in the early 2020s to launch an art-focused social justice initiative with her family. In particular, she had been inspired by the publication of and reaction to an opinion article her daughter Sophie wrote for the magazine The Chronicle of the Horse in June 2020, shortly after the murder of George Floyd, which decried white privilege in the equestrian community. Gochman's husband, David Gochman, is a member of the family that founded and previously owned Academy Sports + Outdoors before selling their ownership stake.

After meeting and partnering with art dealer Zach Feuer, Becky Gochman found and purchased a 38–acre property in New York's Hudson Valley, which features the only residential buildings in the United States designed by Chinese artist Ai Weiwei, originally built for art collector Christopher Tsai. They also learned that the site was on the historical homelands of a group of Mohican people, whose descendants were eventually displaced and formed the Stockbridge–Munsee Community, a federally recognized tribal nation in Wisconsin. In light of the property's history and after realizing that few arts organizations existed specifically to support contemporary Indigenous artists, Gochman and Feuer decided to focus the project on Indigenous art and artists, launching Forge Project in 2021.

The organization was originally formed as an LLC, which Gochman said was a decision she made so as not to personally benefit from the tax advantages of funding a nonprofit. Gochman and Feuer said they believed the project would not be successful or meaningful without Indigenous leadership, so they invited Carcross/Tagish First Nation curator Candice Hopkins to serve as the organization's executive director.

Among the first programs launched by the project was a lending collection of contemporary art by Indigenous artists for other institutions to use in exhibitions. Gochman had collected a significant amount of contemporary Indigenous art by this point and donated the majority of it to Forge Project before hiring Feuer as the director of her new, separate, Gochman Family Collection.

Forge Project launched its first artist fellowship, funded by Gochman, in August 2021, awarding grants and studio residencies to four Indigenous artists and cultural practitioners. The organization expanded its fellowship cohort in 2022 to six recipients. Also in 2022, Forge Project partnered with nearby Bard College to develop the school's Indigenous studies degree program and launch the Center for Indigenous Studies at Bard. Funded by two $25 million grants from Gochman and the Open Society Foundations, the partnership also created a new Indigenous curatorial fellowship at Bard, with Hopkins named as the first recipient. A third cohort of six Forge Project fellowship recipients was announced in May 2023.

=== 2024–present: Transition to Indigenous–led nonprofit ===
In Spring 2024, Forge Project announced that the organization would transition from an LLC to a nonprofit organization, governed by a steering council of Indigenous artists and leaders overseeing a board of directors. The decision to adopt a nonprofit structure was made in order to access more sources of funding and to allow for a more direct, Indigenous-led governance model.

As part of the transition process, Forge Project commissioned the Indigenous artist collective New Red Order to create a humorous short film, titled Forge Reciprocal Relations, announcing the new nonprofit status and encouraging donors to support the project. The organization also announced a multi-year memorandum of understanding with the Stockbridge–Munsee Community to address tribal access to their homelands, wealth redistribution to the tribe, and tribal autonomy over representations of their cultural history. The fourth cohort of six Forge Project fellowship recipients was announced soon after the organization transitioned to nonprofit status.

== Collection and programs ==
One of Forge Project's primary goals is to support Indigenous artists through art purchases as well as the public exhibition of their art through a permanent lending collection available to other institutions. The organization's art collection includes works by Native American (including Alaska Native), Native Hawaiian, First Nations, Métis, and Inuit artists, the majority of whom are living. Artists with works in the collection include Natalie Ball, Judy Chartrand, Dana Claxton, Demian Dinéyazhi', Nicholas Galanin, Raven Halfmoon, Edgar Heap of Birds, Faye HeavyShield, Sky Hopinka, Matthew Kirk, Wendy Red Star, Eric-Paul Riege, Jaune Quick-to-See Smith, and Charlene Vickers, among others. (Note: These names are sourced from articles in The New York Times, Observer, frieze magazine, and Hudson Valley magazine.)

In addition, Forge Project sponsors an annual fellowship program for Indigenous artists, creatives, and cultural practitioners. The fellowship is limited to enrolled citizens of federally recognized tribes or First Nations, as well as members of Alaska Native corporations and individuals of Native Hawaiian descent, and the program includes slots permanently set aside for applicants who are enrolled citizens of the Stockbridge–Munsee Community. Past fellows have included Hopinka, musician Laura Ortman, curator and artist Tania Willard, composer Brent Michael Davids, and choreographer Emily Johnson.

Forge Project also hosts workshops and programs supporting other aspects of Indigenous culture including meals centered on Indigenous foodways and land remediation events to support the organization's strategy of repopulating the property with native plant species.

== Structure and leadership ==
In 2024, the Forge Project Association incorporated as a 501(c)(3) nonprofit organization in Ancram, New York.

Upon transitioning to a nonprofit organization in 2024, Forge Project established a new Indigenous steering council made up of seven Indigenous artists and leaders serving three-year terms. Steering council members have included artists G. Peter Jemison, Jeffrey Gibson, and Hopinka, as well as scholar Jolene Rickard. The steering council has ultimate authority over the organization's board of directors to ensure Indigenous leadership in decision-making.
