= Lyse Lemieux (artist) =

Canadian artist

- Born: Ottawa, Ontario
- Known for: Artist
- Awards: 2017 VIVA Award
- Website: www.lyselemieux.com

Lyse Lemieux is a Canadian contemporary visual artist based in Vancouver. She has exhibited nationally and internationally since 1976. Her art practice focuses primarily on drawing, painting and installation work.

== Biography ==
Lyse Lemieux was born in 1956 in Ottawa, Canada. She studied at the University of Ottawa (1973–75) and received a BFA from the University of British Columbia (1976-1978). Lemieux was appointed and served for eight years (2002-2010) as a part-time member of the Canadian Artist and Producers Professional Relations Tribunal, a quasi-judicial tribunal in Ottawa, responsible for the interpretation and administration of the Status of the Artist Act (SAA). She also worked on contract as a radio producer and television journalist in Vancouver for La Société Radio-Canada in Vancouver (1987-2013). She currently lives and works in Vancouver, British Columbia, Canada. Lemieux was the winner of the 2017 VIVA Award.

== Artistic practice ==
Lemieux's practice focuses on expanded drawing and drawing installation. Her materials vary, but have included textiles, ink on paper, and wool felt. Her content is mostly abstract, but she often employs ovoids. Robin Laurence has said that Lemieux uses these "lopsided ovals to suggest either human heads or bodies, part of an experimental drawing practice that dodges between abstraction and figuration. She has also claimed unexpected materials such as fabric, found clothing, even medical tape as drawing materials, confounding our understanding of medium and process." Her work is known for a sensitive, lyrical line which Marina Roy details, "the viewer attempts to pinpoint what it is about a particular combination of line quality, ink wash and fabric collage that evokes such humour, absurdity and pathos." Her abstractions fragment the subject by separating heads and torsos, Robin Laurence sees this as a moment "created out of disjointed parts are reminiscent of the surrealist practice of 'Exquisite Corpse'." Her work has been curated alongside Vikky Alexander, Nadia Myre, Beth Stuart, Meryl McMaster, Shary Boyle, Carol Wainio and Luanne Martineau in Aujourd'hui Encore at Trépanier Baer in Calgary, and more recently curated by Daina Augaitis and Jesse McKee for the Vancouver Art Gallery show Vancouver Special: Ambivalent Pleasures which contextualized emerging artists like Jeneen Frei Njootli, and Krista Belle Stewart with established artists like Mina Totino, Gary Neil Kennedy, and Elizabeth McIntosh.

=== Selected exhibitions ===
2021: Trespassers/Intrus (solo), Burnaby Art Gallery, Burnaby

2021: Holding a line in your hand, Kamloops Art Gallery, Kamloops

2020: Enceinte (solo), Wil Aballe Art Projects, Vancouver

2020: No Fixed Abode (solo), Simon Fraser University, Burnaby

2019: Painted Drawings (solo), Wil Aballe Art Projects, Vancouver

2019: Some Kind of Behaviour (solo), Terminal Creek Contemporary, Bowen Island

2018: Full Frontal (solo), Contemporary Art Gallery, Vancouver

2018: 13 Ways to Summon Ghosts Gordon Smith Gallery, North Vancouver

2016-17: Vancouver Special: Ambivalent Pleasures, Vancouver Art Gallery

2016-17: Kitchen Midden, Griffin Art Projects, Vancouver

2016: A Girl's Gotta Do What a Girl's Gotta Do, (solo) Richmond Art Gallery, Richmond

2015: Out of Line, Oakville Galleries, Oakville, Ontario

2015: Black is the Size of My New Dress (solo), Republic Gallery, Vancouver

2015: In-Between-In-Between (with Meryl McMaster), Katzman Contemporary, Toronto

2014: Shaped Drawings, Something Wrong About the Mouth (solo), Republic Gallery, Vancouver

2014: Beside Yourself, AHVA Gallery, Audain Art Centre, University of British Columbia, Vancouver

1982: Festival Francophone 1982, Salon de printemps : Exposition d’arts visuels. Centre Culturel Columbien( Vancouver, B.C)

1978: An exhibition of works in transparent media: Sandy Arthur, Garry Cullen, Anna Gustafson, D’Arey Henderson, Lyse Lemieux, Lynn Vardenan, Surrey Art Gallery

== Selected bibliography ==
- Jennifer Cane, Robin Laurence, Otoniya J. Bitek, Lyse Lemieux: Trespassers/Intrus, Burnaby Art Gallery, 2021
- Kevin Griffin, Lyse Lemieux turns black felt into leaning bodies, Vancouver Sun, June 8, 2016
- Robin Laurence, Lyse Lemieux; A Girls Gotta Do What A Girls Gotta Do, Georgia Straight, May 12, 2016
- Michèle Smolkin, Les Corps Feutrés de Lyse Lemieux, La Source, 19 avril, 2016
- Anaïs Elboujdaïni, Fille fait ce que fille doit: Dans l'entrelacs de la feutrine, La Source, April 2016
- Kevin Griffin, Lyse Lemieux uses scissors to draw in black felt, Vancouver Sun, November 12, 2015
- Terence Dick, Lyse Lemieux at Katzman Contemporary, Akimblog, March, 2015
- Dion Kliner, Vancouver Report: Lyse Lemieux, Two Coats of Paint; A New York Blog, February, 2014
- Marina Roy, Lyse Lemieux at Republic Gallery, Border Crossings, March, 2014
- Raissa Alvero, In conversation with Lyse Lemieux, The Portefolio.com, February, 2013
- Robin Laurence, Lyse Lemieux; New Work, Georgia Straight, November, 2012
- Robin Laurence, Cut and Paste, Georgia Straight, August, 2012
- Robin Laurence, Soldiers and Vesperers, Georgia Straight, April, 2009
- Robin Laurence, Lemieux weaves ideas into artful dresses, Georgia Straight, March, 2004
