= Candice Hopkins =

First Nations curator

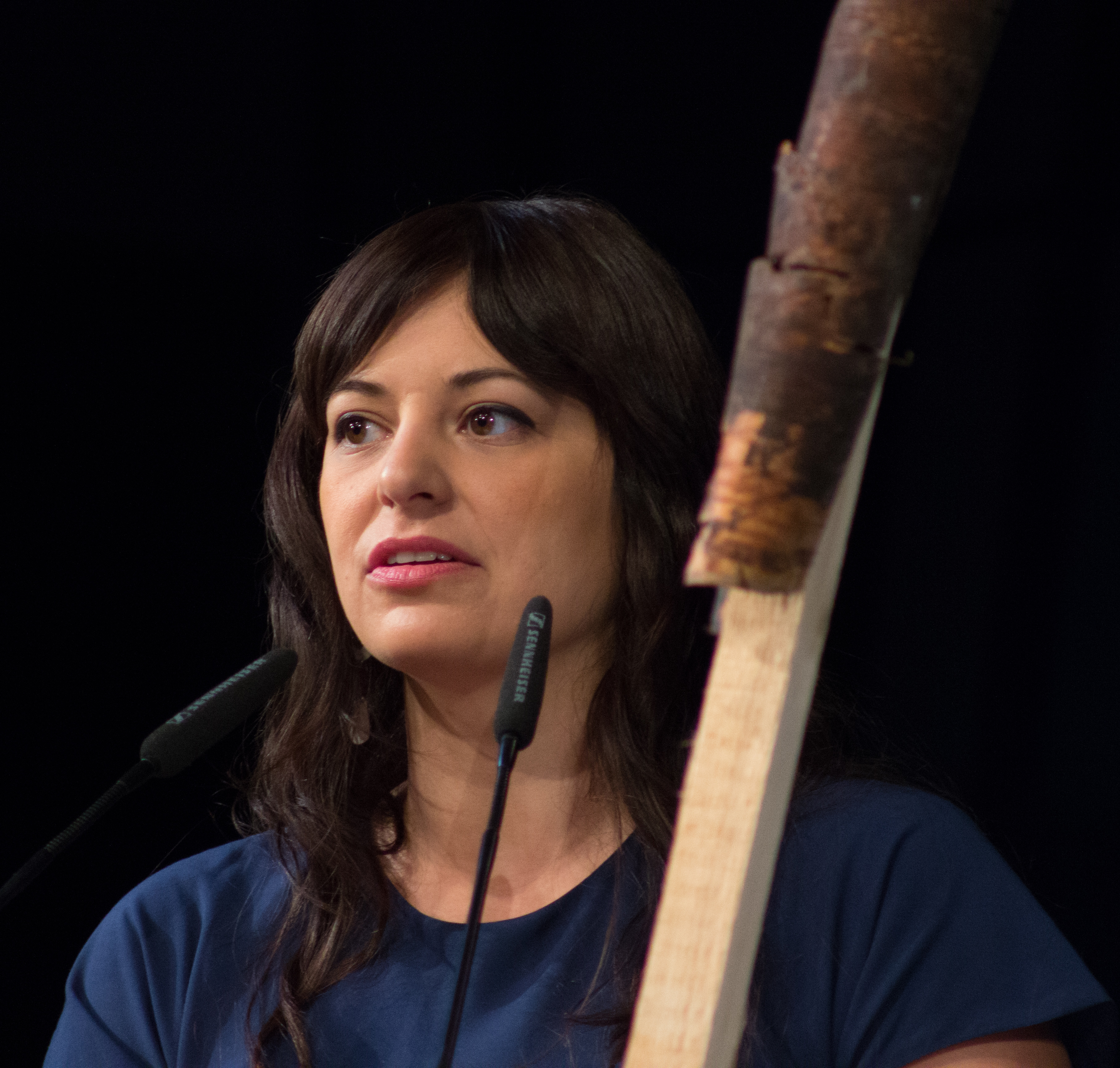
- Born: 1977 (age 48–49); Whitehorse, Yukon, Canada
- Citizenship: Carcross/Tagish First Nation
- Education: Bard College (MA, 2003)
- Known for: Curator, writer, researcher
- Spouse: Raven Chacon

Candice Hopkins (born 1977) is a Carcross/Tagish First Nation independent curator, writer, and researcher who predominantly explores areas of art by Indigenous peoples. She is the executive director and chief curator at the Forge Project in New York.

== Early life and education ==
Candice Hopkins was born 1977 in Whitehorse, Yukon, Canada. Hopkins is a citizen of Carcross/Tagish First Nation. Hopkins was raised in Whitehorse and Fort St. John, British Columbia. Hopkins attended school for her undergraduate degree in Calgary, Alberta at the Alberta University of Art (BFA, 1999) and completed a one-year exchange program at Margaret Street at the University of Birmingham. Following her BFA, she was a contract archivist with Treaty 8 Tribal Association in Fort St. John, and an assistant cultural programmer at the Native Friendship Centre, it was there where she learned about and later participated in an 8-month internship for Indigenous youth with Wainimate in Suva, Fiji, working with local medicine practitioners in recovering Indigenous knowledge of traditional medicine sponsored by the South Pacific Peoples Foundation. With Wainimate, she helped organize the organization's representation in Expo 2000 in Hannover, Germany. This experience shifted her interest from working as an artist to curatorial practice.

She attended the masters program at the Center for Curatorial Studies, Bard College (MA, 2003). She funded her BFA and MA studies by working as a horse trainer on her family's ranch in Baldonnel and as a lab technician at a pulp and paper mill in Taylor, BC.

Between 2000 and 2005 she held various positions at The Banff Centre, including as Aboriginal Curatorial Fellow at the Walter Phillips Gallery, where she organized some of her earliest projects, performances and exhibitions including with Cheryl L'Hirondelle and Minerva Cuevas and was mentored by the influential Mohawk curator Lee-Ann Martin and writer and museum director, Anthony Kiendl.

== Curation ==
Hopkins is co-curator of the 2018 SITE Santa Fe biennial, Casa Tomada and was named senior curator for the 2019 and 2021 editions of the Toronto Biennial of Art and on the curatorial team of the Canadian Pavilion of the 58th Venice Biennale, featuring the work of the media art collective Isuma. She was a co-curator for documenta 14, including for projects by Beau Dick, Rebecca Belmore, Agnes Denes, Guillermo Galindo, Iver Jåks, Britta Marakatt-Labba, Máret Ánne Sara, Mataaho Collective, Joar Nango, Elle-Hánsa (Hans Ragnar Mathisen), Synnøve Person, Ralph Hotere, and Nomin Bold, among others. She has held curatorial positions at prestigious institutions including the Walter Phillips Gallery, Western Front Society, the National Gallery of Canada, and The Institute of American Indian Arts Museum of Contemporary Native Arts in Santa Fe, New Mexico. She has been published widely and lectured internationally and is the recipient of the 2015 Hnatyshyn Foundation Award for Curatorial Excellence in Contemporary Art.

== Writing ==
Her recent essays include "The Appropriation Debates" for Mousse magazine, "Outlawed Social Life", on the ban of the potlatch ceremony and the work of the late artist Beau Dick (Kwakwaka'wakw, 1955–2017) for the documenta 14 edited issue of South as a State of Mind (2016) as well as the chapter "The Gilded Gaze: Wealth and Economies on the Colonial Frontier," in the documenta 14 Reader.

In 2016, as part of the run-up to 2017's Documenta 14 in Kassel, Germany, and Athens, Greece, Hopkins co-organized the School of Listening, a summer intensive program in Kassel for students from both cities. In September, 2016 Hopkins quickly responded to the untimely death of artist Annie Pootoogook in the article "An Elegy for Annie Pootoogook (1969–2016)", featured in the online art criticism publication Momus. For the conclusion of the article Hopkins draws similarities between Pootoogook's generous character and her unbridled genius and Sedna, an Arctic folkloric character who met an untimely death by drowning, and through death evolved to become the mother of the sea.

For the 13th edition of Fillip released in the Spring 2011, Hopkins wrote "The Golden Potlatch: Study in Mimesis and Capitalist Desire". In this text, Hopkins introduces the interconnectedness between Indigenous lands, prospectors interests, and monetary desires catalyzed by the Klondike Gold Rush.

Other writings and articles include "Fair Trade Heads: A Conversation on Repatriation and Indigenous Peoples with Maria Thereza Alves and Jolene Rickard" for South As a State of Mind; "Inventory" for C Magazine on sound, harmonics and Indigenous pedagogies; "Native North America," a conversation with Richard William Hill for Mousse Magazine, and, also in Mousse, an interview with artist and architect Joar Nango, "Temporary Structures and Architecture on the Move."

== Curatorial projects ==
A select list of curation projects by Hopkins follows.

- Before the Internet: Networks and Art (2007), Western Front, Vancouver, British Columbia, Canada
- Close Encounters: The Next 500 Years (2011), Plug In Institute of Contemporary Art, Winnipeg, Manitoba, Canada
- Sakahàn: International Indigenous Art (2013), National Gallery of Canada, Ottawa, Ontario, Canada
- Unsettled Landscapes: SITELINES (2014). Hopkins worked with a team of three other individuals: Lucía Sanromán, Curator;Janet Dees, Curator of Special Projects; and Irene Hofmann, SITElines Director.
- documenta 14, Kassel, Germany and Athens, Greece (2017)
- 2018 Sitelines Biennial (2018), SITE Santa Fe
- 58th Venice Biennial (2019), Canadian Pavilion
- Soundings: An Exhibition in Five Parts (2020), curated by Candice Hopkins and Dylan Robinson, and featured newly commissioned scores, performances, videos, sculptures, and sound by Indigenous and other artists who respond to this question. Organized by Agnes Etherington Art Centre, Queen's University, Canada. The traveling exhibition is organized by Independent Curators International (ICI).
- Indian Theater: Native Performance, Art, and Self-Determination since 1969 (2023), Hessel Museum of Art, Bard College, New York

== Publications ==
=== Books ===
- Hopkins, Candice; Swanson, Kerry (2008). Shapeshifters, Time Travellers, and Storytellers (exhibition). Royal Ontario Museum. Royal Ontario Museum. ISBN 9780888544551.
- Jahn, Marisa; Hopkins, Candice; Golonu, Berin, eds. (2009). Recipes for an Encounter. Vancouver, Canada: Western Front. ISBN 9780920974476.
- Hill, Greg A.; Hopkins, Candice; Lalonde, Christine (2013). Sakahàn: International Indigenous Art (exhibition). National Gallery of Canada. National Gallery of Canada. ISBN 9780888849120.
- Hopkins, Candice (2014). "If History Moves at the Speed of its Weapons". In Loft, Steven; Swanson, Kerry (eds.). Coded Territories: Tracing Indigenous Pathways in New Media Art. Jackson 2Bears (contributor), Archer Pechawis (contributor), Jason Edward Lewis (contributor), Stephen Foster (contributor), Cheryl L’Hirondelle (contributor). University of Calgary Press. ISBN 978-1-55238-706-1.
- Besaw, Mindy N.; Hopkins, Candice; Well-Off-Man, Manuela (2018). Art for a New Understanding: Native Voices, 1950s to Now (exhibition). Crystal Bridges Museum of American Art. Fayetteville, AR: University of Arkansas Press. ISBN 9781682260807.

=== Articles ===
- Hopkins, Candice (April 25, 2017). "The Appropriation Debates". Mousse Magazine. 60.

== Other Roles ==
On November 10, 2026, the Andy Warhol Foundation for the Visual Arts announced that Cheryl Hopkins had been appointed to the board.
