= Cheryl L'Hirondelle =

Canadian artist (born 1958)

- mihko-pîyêsiw iskwêw
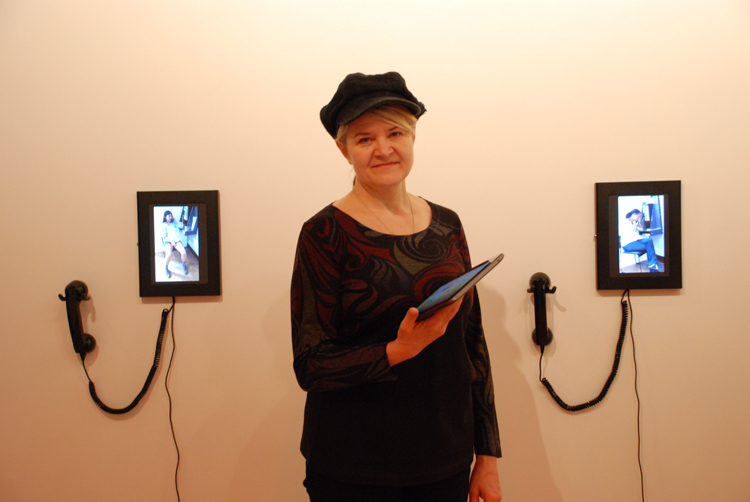
- Cheryl L'Hirondelle at the Art Gallery of Algoma the Cage Bird Sings exhibition
- Born: Cheryl Lynn Koprek; September 20, 1958; Edmonton, Alberta, Canada
- Known for: Music, Performance Art, New Media
- Website: www.cheryllhirondelle.com, www.treatycard.ca, www.wepinasowina.net, www.artinjun.ca, www.ndnspam.com

Cheryl L'Hirondelle (also Waynohtêw, Cheryl Koprek; born September 20, 1958) is a Canadian multidisciplinary media artist, performer, and award-winning musician. She is of Métis/Cree (non-status/treaty), French, German, and Polish descent. Her work is tied to her cultural heritage. She explores a Cree worldview or nêhiyawin through body, mind, emotions, and spirit; examining what it means to live in contemporary space and time.

== Life ==
External videos
- “Cheryl L'Hirondelle @ The Calgary Spoken Word Festival 2010“
- “Access Ignites! / Accès allume ! - Cheryl L'Hirondelle", Ontario Arts Council
- “Shapeshifters - Cheryl L'Hirondelle”, Ontario Arts Council

L'Hirondelle was born in Edmonton, Alberta (amiskwaciy-wâskahikan), Canada. Her mother's family is from Papaschase First Nation, Alberta, and they also lived at Kikino Metis settlement for several years. L'Hirondelle's father emigrated from Germany as a young man shortly after WWII, and initially worked as an inventor for CIL and then later, in the oil industry moving the family around the western provinces to be near many of his gas plant startups. The family eventually moved to Calgary in 1964, where she attended St. Margaret's Elementary and Junior High School. Her last name (L'Hirondelle, her mother's maiden name) means swallow, a "migratory swift-flying songbird."

She spent a year at the Alberta College of Art from 1980-1981, and immediately afterwards attended a 2D course at the University of Calgary for one summer session. She attended the Royal Conservatory of Music in Toronto, Ontario in 1990 and also studied voice, theory and composition privately for several years previous to that. She also studied to be a yoga teacher through Calgary Yoga Centre and Herbalism at Wild Rose College of Natural Healing in Calgary. In 2015 she graduated with an MDes in Inclusive Design, from OCAD University, receiving the OCAD University President's medal. In 2016 she became a PhD candidate with SMARTlab at University College Dublin (UCD) and where she was awarded an Irish Research Council Enterprise scholarship grant in collaboration with Irish world music group's record label Kíla Records.

Since the early 1980s, L'Hirondelle has performed nationally and internationally. She has sung in a wide variety of styles ranging from punk rock to world music and choral ensembles. Her projects include performance art, storytelling, spoken word, audio art, site-specific installations, public art, interactive projects and new media. Her work has appeared in venues including artist-run galleries, public art galleries and museums, and festivals. In 2001, she performed for Prince Charles and the Lieutenant Governor of Saskatchewan, Lynda Haverstock, at the Prince of Wales dinner in Saskatoon, Saskatchewan. Her audiences have also included the Governor General of Canada Michaëlle Jean.

== Music ==
L'Hirondelle studied music as a child. She first became seriously involved in musical performance as the lead singer in Vile, an all-female punk band in Calgary. In the 1990s, in Toronto, she sang with Anishnawbe Quek an intertribal women's group. Around 1995, she formed the duo Nikamok with Joseph Naytowhow. She self-produced Nikamok's self-titled album in 2000, and it was nominated for a Prairie Music Awards (now known as the Western Canadian Music Awards).

L'Hirondelle was also part of the group M'Girl (pronounced ma-girl), an Aboriginal Women's Ensemble with Renae Morriseau, Sheila Maracle and Tiare Laporte. Their first album, Fusion of Two Worlds, won the 2006 Canadian Aboriginal Music Award (CAMA) for Best Female Traditional Roots Album of the Year Award. In 2007, they won the Best Group Award.

L'Hirondelle released her first solo EP, Giveaway, in 2009. Musicologist Brian Wright Mcleod included it in the Encyclopedia of Native Music (2nd ed.) She was also nominated for a KM Hunter Music Award in 2012.

She has worked on an ongoing project with incarcerated women and men in federal prisons and provincial correctional centres and with youth in municipal detention centres, entitled Why the Caged Bird Sings. In 2016, she was awarded an artistic residency at Queen's University with Dylan Robinson, Canada Research Chair in Indigenous Arts. His project titled "Not too few to forget: developing a public art memorial for Kingston's Prison for Women" afforded L'Hirondelle time to begin with a group of former inmates and program staff on a future song-centred memorial project.

== Artwork ==
L'Hirondelle's practice is multi- and inter-disciplinary, with a performative focus. Her work is described as blurring the boundaries between art and activism; memory and forgetting; mind and body; and artist and the broader community.

Early work such as the performance work dearth (by means of the senses), was a collaboration with Mark Dicey at the Walter Phillips Gallery at the Banff Centre in Alberta in 1992. It worked to disconcert personal rituals and myths, as they perform using staging codes observed by young children who are playing at being adults (playing house) to enact family roles and tensions.

With the support of a Toronto Arts Council grant, L'Hirondelle composed four round dance songs from an urban Aboriginal perspective. This led to her consultancy and eventual co-storyteller in residence role, along with other projects with the Meadow Lake Tribal Council. L'Hirondelle received another Toronto Arts Council grant in 2015, this time to return to the idea of composing using traditional song forms for Indigenous language retention.

She and Andrew Lee were part of the First Nations / Second Nature exhibit at the Audain Gallery in Vancouver in 2012. Their work was a reflection on property law, once defined as "everything up to the sky and down to the center of the earth." Organic materials were collected from a city block and organized in a display of plexiglass tubes.

She was a participating artist in the critically acclaimed exhibition Beat Nation, curated by Kathleen Ritter, inspired by a show which originated at grunt gallery by Tania Willard, expanded at the Vancouver Art Gallery in 2012, and traveled across Canada.

In 2014, L'Hirondelle was one of five Indigenous artists selected by the Assembly of First Nations to design commemorative markers to be placed on all 139 sites of former residential schools.

== New Media ==
In 2004, L'Hirondelle was one of two Aboriginal from Canada (with Candice Hopkins) to be invited to Dakar Biennale for Contemporary African Art in Dakar, Senegal. They were the first Canadian Aboriginal artists/curators to present their work there.

L'Hirondelle received imagineNATIVE's Best New Media award in 2005 and again in 2006, for projects including treatycard, 17:TELL, and wêpinâsowina.

L'Hirondelle has incorporated traditional Aboriginal ideas of singing the lane in a number of her project beginning in 2007s. Through current-day cities, she traces Indigenous trails, walking along traditional hunting paths, visiting ceremonial locations, and singing and recording. She has walked through Vancouver Toronto and Sydney, Australia. Her five-song Giveaway EP, produced by Gregory Hoskins, incorporates samples from the 2008 Vancouver version of her sonic mapping songwriting project. In 2009, L'Hirondelle's "nikamon ohci askiy" (Vancouver songlines) project was recognized as an Honoree in the Net.Art category from the Webby Awards.

== Visual Art ==
L'Hirondelle's art has taken a variety of forms, including performance, public programming, storytelling, and curation. In the mid-1980s, she worked as a program coordinator for the artist-run centres Second Story and Truck in Calgary, and has subsequently been involved in a number of arts consulting projects. She curated the exhibition Codetalkers of the digital divide (or why we didn't become "roadkill on the information superhighway") at A Space gallery in Toronto in 2009.

== Exhibitions ==
L'Hirondelle was one of four artists in the exhibition Wild Fire on the Plains: Contemporary Saskatchewan Art held at the Mendel Art Gallery, Saskatoon, in 2003. She participated in the three-person exhibition Object Lessons, held March 24-April 15, 2006 at Paved Art + New Media, Saskatoon. In 2008, curator Richard William Hill featured L'Hirondelle's work in the exhibition The World Upside Down, held at the Walter Phillips Gallery and three other art museums. L'Hirondelle had a solo exhibition, êkâya-pâhkaci (don't freeze up) at Toronto Free Gallery in 2008.

Her work has been included in Caught in the Act: An Anthology of Performance Art by Canadian Women (2012) and Making a Noise: Aboriginal Perspectives on Art, Art History, Critical Writing and Community (2006).

== Awards ==
- Governor General's Award in Visual and Media Arts (2021)
