= Marian Penner Bancroft =

Canadian artist and photographer

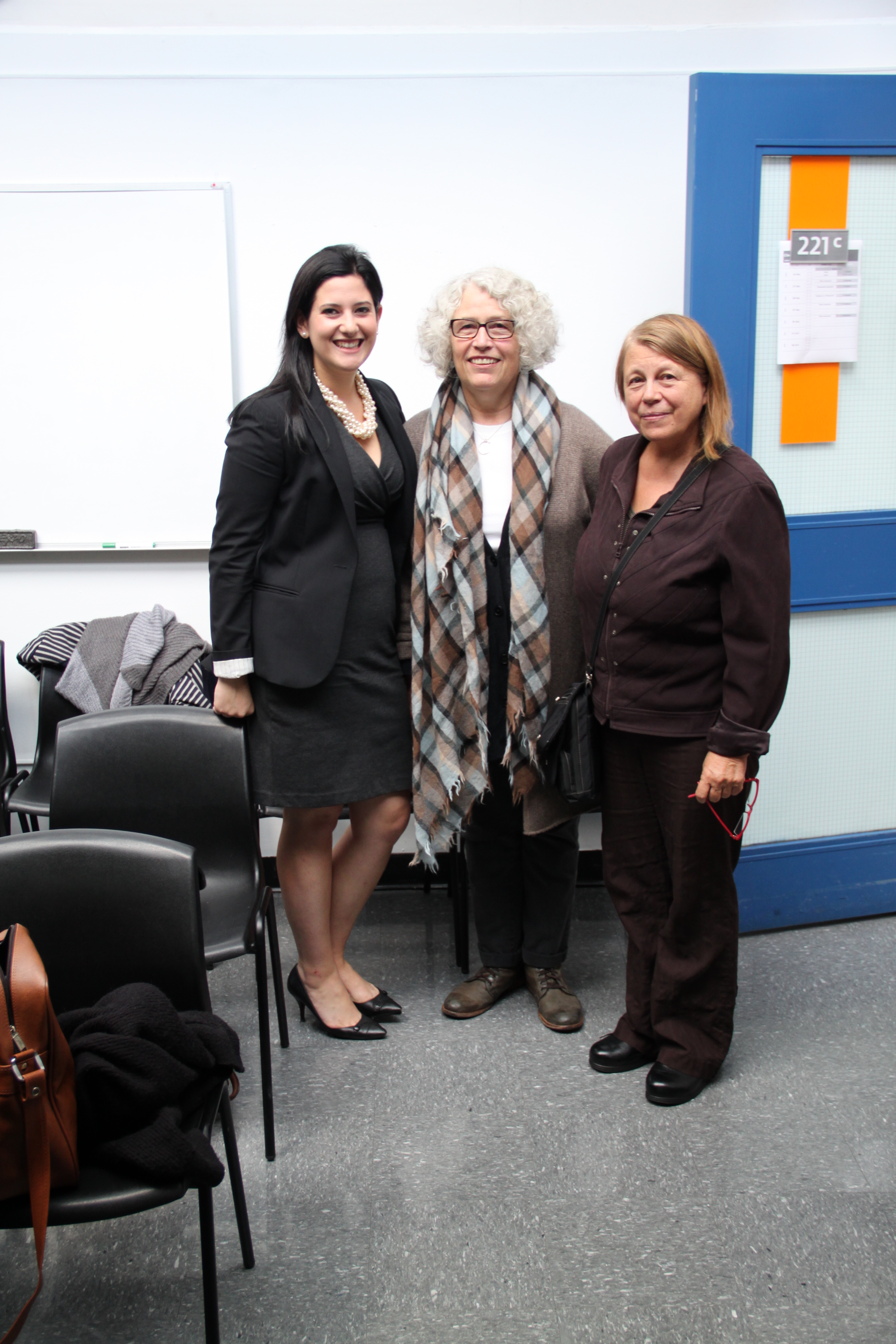
- Donna DiDomenico with Associate Professors Marian Penner-Bancroft and Sandra Semchuk
- Born: 1947 (age 78–79); Chilliwack, British Columbia
- Known for: artist, educator
- Website: http://www.republicgallery.com/artists/bancroft.html#

Marian Penner Bancroft RCA (born 1947) is a Canadian artist and photographer based in Vancouver. She is an associate professor at the Emily Carr University of Art and Design, where she has been teaching since 1981. She has previously also taught at Simon Fraser University and the Nova Scotia College of Art and Design. She is a member of the board of Artspeak Gallery and is represented in Vancouver by the Republic Gallery.

== Life ==
Marian Penner Bancroft was born in Chilliwack, British Columbia, and currently lives and works in Vancouver. She studied at the University of British Columbia, the Vancouver School of Art (now Emily Carr University of Art and Design) and Ryerson Polytechnical Institute in Toronto.

National and international exhibitions include those at the Vancouver Art Gallery and at the Centre Culturel Canadien in Paris. In addition to photography, her work has included text, sound, drawing, sculpture and more recently, video.

In 2019, Bancroft was featured in the film, Is There a Picture. The documentary discusses photographers and their practice in Vancouver.

== Work ==
Her work considers the intersections of the photographic image with history, music and mapping strategies in relation to representations of landscape and nature. In addition to photography, her work has included text, sound, drawing, sculpture and more recently, video.

In 2014, Marian Penner Bancroft installed a site-specific public art installation at the Vancouver Yaletown-Roundhouse Skytrain Station. The project was supported by the Contemporary Art Gallery. The photographic work was installed on the windows of the station, creating abstract images of branches and shapes creating a kaleidoscope effect. The trees were a referential homage to the earliest plantings of elms and sequoias in Vancouver.

== Publications ==
Two Places at Once: Transfigured Wood Part 4 (1986) Western Front Society publications, Vancouver, British Columbia.

== Selected exhibitions ==
the poets have always preceded: art and poetry in Vancouver, 1960 – present, Griffin Art Projects (2019)

Radial Systems, Republic Gallery (2017)

Pictures From Here, Vancouver Art Gallery (2017)

Sites of Assembly, Morris and Helen Belkin Art Gallery, University of British Columbia, Vancouver (2017)

Unsettled Sites: Marian Penner Bancroft, Wanda Nanibush, Tania Willard, SFU Gallery, Vancouver (2016)

Silvia Part II: Booming Grounds, (2015–2016)

By Land and Sea (Prospect and Refuge), (solo), The Reach Gallery Museum, Abbotsford (2014)

Auto-Motive, Oakville Galleries, Oakville, Ontario (2013)

Spiritlands: t/here: Marian Penner Bancroft, Selected Photo Works 1975-2000 Vancouver Art Gallery (2012)

By Land and Sea (Prospect and Refuge), Southern Alberta Art Gallery (2001)

By Land and Sea (Prospect and Refuge) Presentation House Gallery (1999)

== Public art ==
Boulevard at Yaletown-Roundhouse (2014) Canada Line Subway Station, Vancouver

Root System, Pipeline Road, Stanley Park (2007–2008, 6 month installation), Davie and Pacific Boulevard, commissioned by TransitBC and the Canada Line

Lost Streams, Kitsilano (1995–1996), City of Vancouver Park Board, permanent site-specific installation

== Selected collections ==
- The National Gallery of Canada
- Contemporary Art Gallery (Vancouver)
- Vancouver Art Gallery
- Government of Canada, Department of Foreign Affairs
- Canadian Museum of Contemporary Photography

== Selected awards ==
- Higashikawa Award for photographic achievements, Japan, 2018
- Audain Prize for Lifetime Achievement in the Visual Arts, 2012
- Mayor's Arts Award (Visual Arts), Vancouver, 2009
- Canada Council Paris Studio Residency Award 2005
- Canada Council Grant to Established Artists 2001, 1996

== Selected bibliography ==
- Laurence, Robin. "Excavating the city’s roots." Georgia Straight. January 2008.
- Bancroft, Marian Penner, Ed. "UBC in the Sixties: A conversation with Audrey Capel Doray, Gathie Falk, Donald Gustein, Karen Jamieson, Glenn Lewis, Jamie Reid, and Abraham Rogatnick." Ruins in Process: Vancouver Art in the Sixties. 2009.
