= Carole Itter =

- Born: September 29, 1939 (age 86); Vancouver, Canada
- Known for: Sculptor, writer, performance artist, filmmaker, photographer
- Awards: VIVA Award (1989); Audain Prize in Visual Art (2017); Governor General’s Awards in Visual and Media Arts (2026)

Carole Itter (born September 29, 1939) is a Canadian artist, writer, performer and filmmaker.

== Life ==
Itter attended the Vancouver School of Art in 1961. She later became an instructor at the university. She attended the Accademia di Belle Arti di Roma in 1964. Itter lived with her partner, Al Neil, in a structure known as the Blue Cabin, which was originally built in 1932 and located near Cates Park in North Vancouver. The Blue Cabin was restored and moved to False Creek to serve as a floating artist residency in 2019.

== Career ==
Itter's sculptures, assemblages, collages, installations, performances and writings are strongly influenced by the people and places where she has lived and frequently reflect social and political issues. She is represented in the collections of the Vancouver Art Gallery, the Vancouver Public Library, and the Canada Council Art Bank.

=== Art ===
Itter's 1972 piece Personal Baggage has been described as a key work in Vancouver art. This piece acted to shift art from the gallery setting into the physical world by removing a cedar log from Roberts Creek, British Columbia, disassembling it, and then transporting it to Lockeport, Nova Scotia, where it was reassembled. This process was documented by Itter and published in a book entitled The Log's Log.

Her 1979 photo series Euclid documents her partner, Al Neil, tracing geometric figures in the sand of Cates Park in North Vancouver. These photographs were then projected onto one of Neil's live piano performances and used as cover art for his album Fog and Boot.

In 1994, Itter collaborated with Luke Blackstone and Al Neil on her installation of found objects emerging from an antique organ that were painted and gilded for her exhibit Where the Streets are Paved with Gold: A Tribute to a Canadian Immigrant Neighbourhood. Itter claimed she was inspired by immigrants in her Vancouver community who shared their experiences of Canada with her, calling it "a place where the streets were paved with gold."

=== Writing ===
In 1972, Itter had a daughter, Lara, with Vancouver poet Gerry Gilbert. After battling depression for many years, Lara Gilbert died by suicide in 1995. Itter edited Lara's extensive journals and published them under Lara's name in I Might Be Nothing. Between 1978 and 1979, with Daphne Marlatt, Itter compiled and edited a history of Vancouver's Strathcona neighbourhood titled Opening Doors: Vancouver's East End. Their book was republished as Opening Doors in Vancouver's East End: Strathcona in 2011. Other works by Itter include The Log's Log and Whistle Daughter Whistle. Her writing has also been featured in literary magazines such as Room of One's Own.

== Awards ==
In 1989, Itter received a VIVA Award.

In 2017, she received the Audain Prize for the Visual Art.

In 2026, she received the Governor General's Award in Visual and Media Arts from the Canada Council.

== Selected exhibitions ==
- 1984: Rattles, Western Front
- 1991: Where the Streets are Paved with Gold: A Tribute to a Canadian Immigrant Neighbourhood, Vancouver Art Gallery
- 1994: Desolate Combination of Objects, Pitt Gallery
- 1995: The Float, Or Gallery
- 1999: The Pink Room, grunt gallery
- 2007: Metallic: A Fish Film, grunt gallery
- 2008: WACK! Art and the Feminist Revolution, Vancouver Art Gallery
- 2013: The Piano, Art Gallery of Alberta
- 2015: The Poetics of Space, Vancouver Art Gallery
- 2015: Between Object and Action: Transforming Media in the 1960s and 70s, Vancouver Art Gallery
- 2019: Beginning with the Seventies: Radial Change, Morris and Helen Belkin Art Gallery
- 2020: Art at Home Live, Vancouver Art Gallery
- 2023: Only When I’m Hauling Water Do I Wonder if I’m Getting Any Stronger, Morris and Helen Belkin Art Gallery
