= Paul Sepuya =

American photographer and artist

Paul Mpagi Sepuya
- Born: 1982 (age 43–44); San Bernardino, California, U.S.
- Education: Tisch School of the Arts, New York University (BA); UCLA (MFA)
- Known for: Portraiture
- Movement: Contemporary studio portraiture

Paul Mpagi Sepuya (born 1982) is an American photographer and artist. His photographic work focuses heavily on the relationship between artist and subject, often exploring queerness and the nude in relation to the intimacy of studio photography. Portraiture is the foundation of Sepuya's work.

== Early life ==
Sepuya was born in San Bernardino, California. He attended private schools. He came out in 1995, while in middle school. The summer before his junior year of high school, he took an introduction to photography course at the University of California, Riverside.

He received a Bachelor in Fine Arts in Photography & Imaging from the New York University Tisch School of the Arts in 2003. He earned a Master of Fine Arts in Photography from the University of California, Los Angeles (UCLA) Department of Art in 2016. His thesis work was presented at the UCLA MFA Exhibition #3.

== Career ==
Sepuya is known for his portraiture. He often depicts his subjects in fragments—torsos, arms, legs, or feet—rather than showing the entire body. His photographs are sometimes ripped apart and rearranged. His work also shows his interest in the history of portraiture. He often photographs in a studio.

Sepuya's series Studio Work (2010–11) reflects his interest in portraiture and the intimacy between sitter and photographer in a studio environment. His work examines the subject's personality and character, as well as the "private performance that exists within the photographic studio". He draws inspiration from the works of Robert Mapplethorpe and Brian O'Doherty. He has been an artist-in-residence at the Studio Museum in Harlem, and his work is in the collection of the Leslie-Lohman Museum of Gay and Lesbian Art.

Sepuya has published artist's books and editions with Printed Matter, Inc. He has shot editorial features for publications including I.D., Kaiserin Magazine, and Butt. He self-published the periodical Shoot starting in 2005. In 2010, he co-created the publication The Accidental Egyptian and Occidental Arrangements with artist Timothy Hull.

Sepuya's work has been exhibited at venues including the Museum of Contemporary Art, Los Angeles; the Studio Museum in Harlem; Franklin Art Works, Minneapolis; the Artist Institute in New York; and the Center for Photography at Woodstock. He has had solo exhibitions at venues such as DOCUMENT in Chicago, the Platform Centre for Photography and Digital Arts in Winnipeg, the Clough-Hanson Gallery at Rhodes College in Memphis, Artspeak Gallery in Vancouver, and the Blaffer Art Museum in Houston. He is represented by DOCUMENT, Chicago, and Yancey Richardson Gallery, New York.

Four of his photographs are held in the collection of the Museum of Modern Art, New York, and he was included in its Spring 2018 exhibition New Photography. In 2018, he was represented by Team Gallery, where his solo exhibition The Conditions debuted in March 2019. Sepuya's work was included in the 79th Whitney Biennial in 2019. His Darkroom Mirror (_2070386) (2017), from the series Darkroom Mirrors, was featured on the cover of the March 2019 issue of Artforum.

Sepuya began his teaching career at the California Institute of the Arts; he was referred to the job by Catherine Opie. Later, Fia Backström and Pradeep Dalal invited Sepuya to teach for two summers at Bard College. Sepuya is a professor in visual arts at the University of California, San Diego (UCSD). He was recruited to UCSD by Amy Adler.

== Critical reception ==
Critics have noted Sepuya's use of fragmentation in his portraiture. A contributor to The Brooklyn Rail discussed Sepuya's Mirror Study (2016), writing about how "the photographer captures himself photographing a cut-up portrait of a man taped to a mirror, hiding the camera and all but his arms behind what remains of the printed image". Barry Schwabsky in The Nation wrote that Sepuya's photographs "almost too perfectly encapsulate the current tendency to see photography as a game of mirrors" and that his "conceptually self-questioning strategies and fastidious-almost-to-the-point-of-finicky aesthetics account, in part, for why he seems to be a must-have artist of the moment".

== See also ==
- AA Bronson
- George Platt Lynes
- Robert Mapplethorpe
- Slava Mogutin
- Richard Bruce Nugent
