= Lyse Lemieux =

Lyse Lemieux may refer to:

- Lyse Lemieux (judge)
- Lyse Lemieux (artist)
