= Elspeth Pratt =

Canadian sculptor (1953)

- Born: 1953 (age 72–73)
- Known for: Sculptor

Elspeth Pratt (born 1953) is a Canadian contemporary artist based in Vancouver, British Columbia. Pratt is best known for her colorful sculptures using "poor" materials such as cardboard, polystyrene, balsa wood and vinyl, and for her interest in leisure and consumerism in domestic and public spaces. Her use of humble, crude, unusual materials has sometimes been compared to the Arte Povera movement.

== Early life and education ==
Pratt earned her BFA from the University of Manitoba in 1981 and her MFA from the University of British Columbia in 1984. She is currently an Associate Professor and Director of the School for the Contemporary Arts at Simon Fraser University.

== Awards ==
In 2014 Pratt was the recipient of a Vancouver Mayor's Arts Award for Visual Arts. In 1993 she was the recipient of a VIVA Award from the Jack and Doris Shadbolt Foundation.

== Collections ==
Pratt's work is in the collections of the City of Richmond's collection of public art, the Glenbow Museum, the Art Gallery of Nova Scotia, and the Vancouver Art Gallery.

== Select exhibitions ==
- 3 Sculptors: Samuel Roy-Bois, Elspeth Pratt, Jack Jeffrey, Trapp Projects, Vancouver, BC (2019)
- Out of Sight: New Acquisitions, Vancouver Art Gallery, Vancouver, BC (2014)
- Nonetheless (solo), Cooley Art Gallery, Reed College, Portland, Oregon, USA (2011)
- Second Date (solo), Vancouver Art Gallery Offsite, Vancouver, BC (2011).
- Silent as Glue, Art Gallery of Greater Victoria, Victoria, BC (2011)
- Silent as Glue, Southern Alberta Art Gallery, Lethbridge, Alberta (2010–11)
- Haptic, Helen Pitt Gallery, Vancouver, BC (2011)
- SLOW: Relations + Practices, Centre A, Vancouver, BC (2011)
- Enacting Abstraction, Vancouver Art Gallery (2009)
- Two-person show with Elizabeth MacIntosh, Diaz Contemporary (2008)
- Nonetheless (solo), Charles H. Scott Gallery, Vancouver, BC (2008)
- Bluff (solo), Contemporary Art Gallery, Vancouver, BC (2007)
- Doubt (solo), Artspeak, Vancouver, BC (2002)

== Publications ==
In 2011, the Charles H. Scott Gallery and Douglas F. Cooley Memorial Art Gallery co-published a monograph on Pratt's work, with essays by Lorna Brown, Lisa Robertson, Matthew Stadler, Sabine Bitter and Helmut Weber, Oliver Neumann, and Stephanie Snyder.
