= Luanne Martineau =

Canadian multimedia artist

Luanne Martineau (born 1970) is a contemporary, multimedia Canadian artist best known for her hand-spun and felted wool sculptures. Her work engages with social satire as well as feminist textile practice.

== Life ==
Martineau was born in Saskatoon, Saskatchewan. She earned a fine art diploma from the Alberta College of Art & Design in 1993, and a Masters of Fine Art from the University of British Columbia in 1995. She was previously an associate curator at the Art Gallery of Calgary, and later a professor of theory and curatorial studies at the University of Victoria. She is now based in Montreal, where she is an associate professor of painting and drawing at Concordia University.

== Work ==
Martineau has been exhibiting across Canada and internationally since the mid-1990s. Her work blurs the boundaries between craft and fine art, combining labour-intensive female handwork with questions about the politics of the body, style and ideology. Her "drulptures" are three-dimensional felt assemblages that are not literal interpretations of the human form, but which have bodily shapes and grotesque fleshy resemblances. In 2010–2012, the Musée d'art contemporain de Montréal organized a touring exhibition of Martineau's work. This exhibition was accompanied by a catalogue that included essays by Lesley Johnstone, Dan Adler, and Shirley Madill.

== Awards ==
In 2007, Martineau with the winner of the Jack and Doris Shadbolt Foundation's VIVA Award for the Visual Arts. In 2005 she was long-listed for the Sobey Art Award, and in 2009 she was shortlisted.

== Collections ==
Martineau's work is in the collections of the Art Gallery of Nova Scotia, Halifax, the Art Gallery of Greater Victoria, the National Gallery of Canada, Ottawa, the Musée d'art contemporain de Montréal, the Vancouver Art Gallery, and the Alberta Foundation for the Arts, amongst others.

== Select exhibitions ==
- Displacement, Vancouver Art Gallery (2019)
- Women's Work: Anne Low, Luanne Martineau, Olga Abeleva, L’INCONNUE, Montreal (2019)
- COMPRESSION: Elama Herzog + Luanne Martineau, Western Exhibitions, Chicago (2018)
- Fait Main / Hand Made, Musée national des beaux-arts du Québec, Québec City (2018)
- Beyond the Edges: Art & Geometry, Art Gallery of Greater Victoria (2017–18)
- The Green of Her, Oakville Galleries, Oakville, Ontario (2016)
- All Membranes are Porous, Kamloops Art Gallery (2016)
- Luanne Martineau (solo), Art Gallery of Windsor (2012)
- Luanne Martineau (solo), Rodman Hall Arts Centre, Brock University, St. Catherine's Ontario (2011)
- Luanne Martineau (solo), Musée d'art contemporain de Montréal, Québec (2010)
- How Soon is Now, Vancouver Art Gallery (2009)
- Peculiar Culture: The Contemporary Baroque, Art Gallery of Greater Victoria (2006–07)
- Bed Sitter (solo), Contemporary Art Gallery, Vancouver (2004)
