= Marina Roy =

Canadian visual artist and educator

- Born: Quebec City, Quebec, Canada
- Known for: Artist, Educator Writer
- Awards: VIVA
- Website: http://www.marinaroy.ca/

Marina Roy is a visual artist, educator and writer based in Vancouver, British Columbia.

== Life ==
Roy was born in Quebec City, and moved to Vancouver, British Columbia in her youth. She obtained a B.A. in French Literature at Université Laval, a B.F.A. from the Nova Scotia College of Art and Design, and an M.F.A. from the University of British Columbia. She has shown nationally and internationally, including the Vancouver Art Gallery, the Contemporary Art Gallery, Centre A, Malaspina, and Or Gallery. She is an Associate Professor at the University of British Columbia, Department of Art History, Visual Art and Theory.

== Artistic practice ==
Roy's practice is cross disciplinary, with a focus on drawing, painting and animation. Her work investigates material intelligence in a post-humanist perspective. The evolution of her practice draws upon Freud and Bataille, demonstrating modes of fantasy, eroticism, and compulsion by way of changed symbols and recognized icons. The Canadian artist's use of cartoons also aligns her with the domain of the death drive: According to Žižek, characters like Wile E. Coyote occupy a libidinal space where one can live through any catastrophe.

=== Collaborations ===
Roy has collaborated with artist Natasha McHardy as the group "Roy & McHardy", in video performance productions of a DIY ethos. Roy has also collaborated on a web-site project with David Clark and Graham Meiser, creating an online extension of her book Sign After the X. She has also collaborated with artist Abbas Akhavan in artworks, such as the video installation Victoria Day (Bombay Sapphire), wherein they update Manet, with a performance titled "liquid luncheon on the grass", as well as duo exhibitions such as Neighbours and Fire/Fire.

=== Select exhibitions ===
- 2018: Leaning Out of Windows, Michael O'Brian Exhibition Commons, Emily Carr University, Vancouver
- 2017: Landfall and Departure: Prologue, Nanaimo Art Gallery
- 2017: Becoming Animal/Becoming Landscape, Kamloops Art Gallery
- 2016: Becoming Animal/Becoming Landscape, Morris and Helen Belkin Art Gallery, University of British Columbia
- 2016: Your Kingdom to Command, Vancouver Art Gallery (Offsite)
- 2015: The Floating Archipelago, Connexion ARC, Fredericton, New Brunswick
- 2015: Screen Play: Print and the Moving Image, Open Studio, Toronto
- 2013: Once things are reduced to nothing, Artspeak
- 2012: Fire Fire (in collaboration with Abbas Akhavan), Malaspina Printmakers & Centre A
- 2011: What's Pushed out the door, Comes back through the window, (part 2) La Central
- 2011: New Work, Contemporary Art Gallery
- 2011: Unreal, Vancouver Art Gallery
- 2009: How soon is now, Vancouver Art Gallery
- 2008: When the Mood Strikes Us, Platform Gallery
- 2008: Neighbours (in collaboration with Abbas Akhavan; curated by Joni Murphy and Kika Thorne), AMS Gallery
- 2006-08: Trappings (participant in the public art library project Group Search (Art in the Library), Vancouver Public Library)
- 2006: Beauty and the Beast, Alternator Gallery
- 2006: Everyday Every Other Day, Art Gallery of Mississauga
- 2004-06: Roy and McHardy (in collaboration with Natasha McHardy). Or Gallery, Concordia University VAV Gallery
- 2002: Greener Pastures (in collaboration with Abbas Akhavan): Open Space Gallery, Artspeak

=== Bibliography ===
- Kathleen Ritter, How soon is now, exhibition catalogue, Vancouver Art Gallery
- Julie Tremble, Marina Roy/Abbas Akhavan: Menagerie, exhibition catalogue, AXENEO7/DAIMON
- Joni Murphy, Better Homes and Gardens, VIVO Media Arts Centre
- J.J. Kegan McFadden, When the Mood Strikes Us..., Platform Gallery
- Lorna Brown, "Marina Roy: Trappings", Vancouver Public Library
- Seamus Kealy, "The King and I," Morris and Helen Belkin Art Gallery
- Seamus Kealy, "A Few Notes on an Everyday Exhibition," Blackwood Gallery
- Sydney Hermant, "Roy and McHardy," in d'Or (Goin' Solo), Vancouver: Or Gallery
- Jeremy Todd, "Some errant thoughts" in d'Or: Explorations in Psychic Geography, Vancouver: Or Gallery

=== Reviews ===
- Claer, José "Menage a trois: entre l'humain, l'animal et l'art,"
- Dahle, Sigrid "When the Mood Strikes Us..."
- Milroy, Sarah "Pictures are out—experience is in"
- Witt, Andrew "Contemporary Public Art at Vancouver Library"
- Tomic, Milena "Everyday Every Other Day"

== Writing ==
Marina Roy's art practice and writing inform and intersect in their investigation of material, language, history and ideology. She published Sign after the x (Artspeak/Arsenal Pulp Press) in 2001. She contributes reviews and critical essays, for artists such as Lyse Lemieux and Abbas Akhavan, in various magazines and catalogues.

=== Select publications ===
- Roy's first book, Sign After the x (with Artspeak Gallery) was published in 2002.
- Her second book Queuejumping, was published in 2022 with Information Office.
- In Haguenau Forest (short story), in there's something I want to show you
- Holy Shit C Magazine, December 2010

== Honours ==
- VIVA Award, 2010
