= Elizabeth McIntosh =

Elizabeth McIntosh may refer to:

- Lisa McIntosh (born 1982), Australian Paralympian athlete
- Elizabeth McIntosh (artist) (born 1967), Canadian painter
- Elizabeth Peet McIntosh (1915–2015), undercover agent with the OSS during World War II
