= Ron Tran =

Visual artist (b. 1972)

Ron Tran (born 1972) is a visual artist based in Vancouver, British Columbia, Canada.

== Background ==
Tran was born in Saigon, Vietnam and currently lives and works in Vancouver. He studied Integrated Media Arts at Emily Carr University of Art and Design. Tran’s practice involves sculpture, photography, video, performance and installation. His work concerns itself in relation to public and private space, and addresses ideas of individual ownership. He has been featured in articles by Canadian Art. His work has been exhibited in galleries and museums including the Vancouver Art Gallery, the Morris and Helen Belkin Art Gallery and the Vancouver Contemporary Art Gallery.

== Career ==
Tran integrates performance in many of his artworks in various forms. His practice explores the ways chance and coincidence influence daily life. He often removes himself from his art and inserts art into public life. Tran’s work often involve personal investment and occasional voyeuristic cruelty. The performative quality of such work signal his ongoing interest in social interactions both as subject and medium. Tran is a former member of Norma art collective, which started in collaboration with other fellow Emily Carr University art students.

=== Photography ===
The photography series Fruit Tree (2017) is a collaboration between Ron Tran and Mathew Sawyer. Without a clear purpose in mind or the intention to travel in the most efficient manner, the two artist went on a short road trip exposing themselves to random opportunities that comes in their way. The work consists of performative actions and subtle interventions that were conducted resulting in the form of photo documentation.

=== Performance ===
Tran integrates performance in many of his artwork. His practice explores the ways chance and coincidence influence daily life. He often removes himself from his art and inserts art into public life. Apartment #201 (2008) is a piece Tran created for “Everything Should Be Made as Simple as Possible, but Not Simpler”, an exhibition focusing on minimalist and conceptualist strategies by young artists. Tran removes his apartment door and displays it in the gallery for the duration of the exhibition. Apartment #201 takes place both in the gallery and in Tran’s apartment where his private life is suddenly exposed and thus vulnerable. Property was stolen during the happening of this piece.

During the sixth Berlin Biennale in 2010, Tran relocated several park benches previously situated on the opposite side of the Oranienplatz in Berlin, Germany, into closer proximity across the square’s main path. Used most commonly by the area’s large Turkish population and with strict gender division. The newly conversational distance incited a rage of new uses. Tran’s re-positioning transforms bench into auratic object of its prior uses while creating new, although temporary, situation.

It Knows Not What It Is (2011) by Ron Tran is a collaborative installation by a collective of 11 artists and writers, including Angus Ferguson, Angus Ferguson, Pietro Sammarco, Kevin Chong, Erica Stocking, and Paul Kajander. In this work, Tran invited the group of artists to create artworks based on the stick’s form and to be mounted along with Tran’s. Here, each artist remain anonymous as if they are Tran’s silent objects, being placed in a place of collective worship.

== Awards ==
In 2012, Ron Tran was named recipients of the $12,000 2012 VIVA Awards, granted annually by the Jack and Doris Shadbolt Foundation.

In 2015, Ron Tran was named emerging artist in visual arts in the 2015 Mayor’s Arts Awards.

== Selected exhibitions ==
=== Solo exhibition ===
- Ron Tran: It Knows Not What It Is, Charles H. Scott Gallery, Emily Carr Institute of Art and Design, 2011, Vancouver, British Columbia, Canada

=== Group exhibitions ===
- Goodbye Charles, Charles H. Scott Gallery, Emily Carr Institute of Art and Design, 2017, Vancouver, British Columbia, Canada
- Vancouver Special: Ambivalent Pleasures, Vancouver Art Gallery, 2016, Vancouver, British Columbia, Canada
- A View Believed To Be Yours, Catriona Jeffries, Vancouver, British Columbia, 2015, Canada
- Soleil Politique: The museum between light and shadow, Museion, Museo d'Arte Moderna e Contemporanea, 2014, Bolzano, Italy
- The Intellection of Lady Spider House, Art Gallery of Alberta, Edmonton, Alberta, Canada
- Special Collection: Acquisitions and Archives, the Morris and Helen Belkin Art Gallery, University of British Columbia, 2013, Vancouver, British Columbia, Canada
- 6th Berlin Biennale for Contemporary Art, Alte Nationalgalerie, Berlin, Germany
- Triumphant Carrot: The Persistence of Still Life, Contemporary Art Gallery, 2010, Vancouver, British Columbia, Canada
