= Charlene Vickers =

Canadian Ojibwe artist

- Born: 1970 (age 55–56); Kenora, Ontario, Canada
- Citizenship: Wauzhushk Onigum First Nation and Canada
- Education: Emily Carr Institute of Art and Design and Simon Fraser University
- Known for: Artist
- Website: charlenevickersvisualartist.blogspot.ca

Charlene Vickers (born 1970) is an Anishnabe, specifically Ojibwa, artist from Kenora, Ontario currently living and working in Vancouver, British Columbia. She creates political work and, in one work, she responds to "the plight of missing and murdered Indigenous women in British Columbia".

== Education and career ==
She graduated from the Emily Carr Institute of Art and Design and received an MFA from Simon Fraser University. She is on the board of directors at grunt gallery in Vancouver, BC. Her work Sleeman Makazin is in the permanent collections at the Museum of Anthropology at University of British Columbia (UBC) in Vancouver, BC.

== Select solo exhibitions ==
- Brown Skin Before Red. Richmond, BC: Richmond Art Gallery, 2008.
- Ominjimendaan/ to remember. Vancouver, BC: grunt gallery, 2012.
- Ominjimendaan/ to remember. Winnipeg, MB: Urban Shaman Contemporary Aboriginal Art Gallery, 2012.
- Asemaa/Tobacco. Vancouver, BC: Artspeak, 2015.

== Select group exhibitions ==
- Charlene Vickers and Judy Chartrand : Two/many Tribulations. Vancouver, BC: grunt gallery, 2004. Curated by Warren, Daina.
- Charlene Vickers, Deborah Koenker, Mae Leong, and Femke van Delft : Tracking Absence. Toronto, BC: A Space, 2006.
- Charlene Vickers and Maria Hupfield : Vestige Vagabond. Brooklyn, NY: Panoply Performance Lab, 2014.
- (Upcoming) Vancouver Special: Ambivalent Pleasures. Curated by: Daina Augaitis and Jesse McKee. Vancouver Art Gallery, 2017.

== Awards ==
- 2018: VIVA Award (alongside with Hannah Jickling and Helen Reed
