= Rebecca Belmore =

Canadian Anishinaabekwe artist (born 1960)

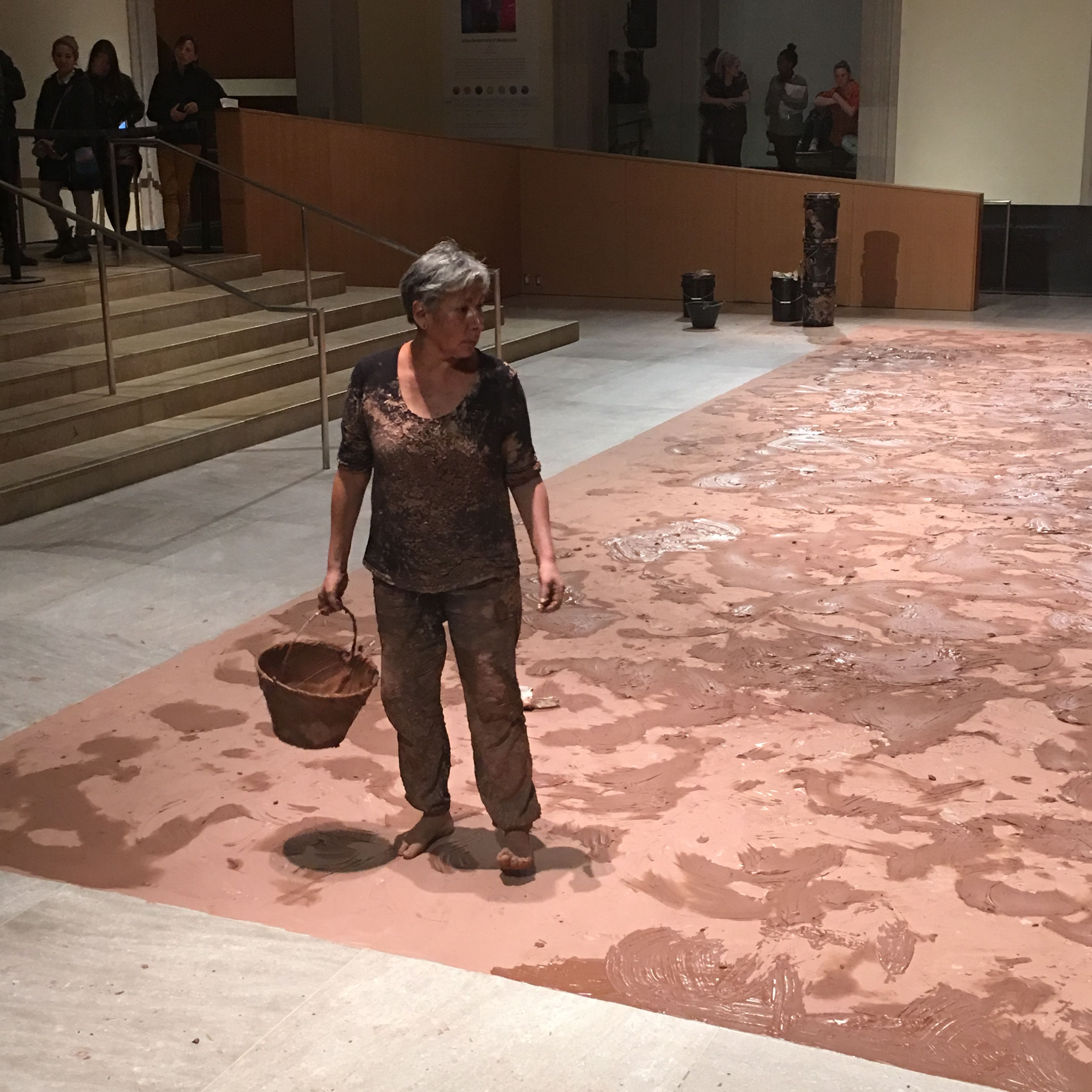
- Rebecca Belmore performing at Nuit Blanche 2016 in the Art Gallery of Ontario
- Born: March 22, 1960 (age 66); Upsala, Ontario, Canada
- Known for: installation artist, Performance artist
- Awards: Governor General's Award 2013
- Website: rebeccabelmore.com

Rebecca Belmore RCA (born March 22, 1960) is an interdisciplinary Anishinaabekwe artist from Canada who is notable for politically conscious and socially aware performance and installation work. She is Ojibwe and a member of Obishikokaang (Lac Seul First Nation). Belmore lives in Toronto, Ontario.

Belmore has performed and exhibited nationally and internationally since 1986. Her work focuses on issues of place and identity, and confronts challenges for First Nations People. Her work addresses history, voice and voicelessness, place, and identity. Her work, be it sculpture, video, or photographic in nature, is performance-based. To address the politics of representation, Belmore's art strives to invert or subvert official narratives, while demonstrating a preference for the use of repetitive gestures and natural materials. Belmore's art reveals a long-standing commitment to politics and how they relate to the construction of identity and ideas of representation. She has exhibited across Canada, the US, Mexico, Cuba and Australia.

== Life ==
Belmore was born on March 22, 1960, in Upsala, Ontario, Canada. Until the age of 16, Belmore spent her summers in Northwestern Ontario with her grandparents. During these summers, her grandmother taught her about harvesting native foods from the land. Author Jessica Bradley describes Belmore's adolescence as difficult due to "the custom ingrained through the [Canadian] government imposed assimilation, she was sent to attend high school in Thunder Bay and billeted with a non-Native family." Bradley adds that as a result of her experience as an adolescent, notions of displacement and cultural loss are "reformed into acts or objects of reparation and protest [within her various works]." Belmore attended the Ontario College of Art and Design in Toronto in 1988.

Belmore's mother was born on a small island in Northern Ontario and her journey to visit her mother's birthplace has had a significant impact on her work.

== Career ==
ishkode (fire) (2021) at the Whitney Biennial in 2022

Belmore has presented work in biennial exhibitions throughout her career. In 1991, she exhibited at the IV Bienal de la Habana, Havana, Cuba. She has twice represented Canada at the Sydney Biennale; in 1998 in the exhibition Every Day, and in 2006 in the exhibition Zones of Contact. In 2005 her work Fountain was shown at the Canadian Pavilion of the 51st Venice Biennale, as the first Indigenous artist ever to represent Canada at the event. In the same year she exhibited as part of Sweet Taboos at the 3rd Tirana Biennale, Tirana, Albania.

Jolene Rickard's Venice Biennale Catalogue essay describes Belmore's work:

As a First Nations or Aboriginal person, Belmore's homeland is now the modern nation of Canada; yet, there is reluctance by the art world to recognize this condition as a continuous form of cultural and political exile. The inclusion of the First Nations political base is not meant to marginalize Belmore's work, but add depth to it. People think of Belmore as both Canadian and Anishinabe—l think of her as an Anishinabe living in the continuously colonial space of the Americas.

Belmore has had two major solo touring exhibitions, The Named and the Unnamed, a multi-part installation that commemorates women missing from Vancouver's Downtown Eastside, at the Morris and Helen Belkin Art Gallery, Vancouver (2002); and 33 Pieces, Blackwood Gallery, University of Toronto at Mississauga (2001). In 2008, the Vancouver Art Gallery hosted Rising to the Occasion, a mid-career survey of Belmore's artistic production. In 2014, Belmore was commissioned to create an original work for the Canadian Museum for Human Rights The work consists of a blanket of hand pressed clay beads, engaging the community in Winnipeg to help produce them.

In 2010, Belmore was involved in a legal dispute with the Pari Nadimi Gallery of Toronto, that sued her for punitive damages and for lost future revenues to $750,000. The lawsuit was settled out of court in 2013; however, inspired her 2010 performance WORTH.

In 2017, Belmore's work was exhibited at documenta 14 in Athens, Greece and in Kassel, Germany.

In 2018, the Art Gallery of Ontario staged a touring retrospective of Belmore's work, Facing the Monumental. Curated by Wanda Nanibush, Facing the Monumental incorporates sculptures, installations, photography and videos spanning 30 years of Belmore's career. It has been the largest exhibition of her work to date, and shown at galleries in Canada and the United States.

Belmore participated in the 2022 Whitney Biennial in New York. Her sculptural installation ishkode (fire) (2021), a clay sculpture of a figure shrouded in a sleeping bag and surrounded by empty bullet shell casings, was included in the exhibition. Journalist Gabriella Angeleti described the piece in The Art Newspaper as "a critique of the historic genocide and ongoing disproportionate violence against Indigenous people," calling the work "a centerpiece" of the exhibition.

=== Artworks ===
==== Descriptions of important works ====
Belmore's interactive installation Mawa-che-hitoowin: A Gathering of People for Any Purpose (1992), featured a circle of chairs from Belmore's kitchen and kitchen chairs owned by other women close to her, arranged in a circle. Each chair had a pair of headphones resting on it. Visitors were invited to sit in each chair, put on the headphones, and listen to the stories of the struggles and triumphs of different indigenous women in Canada, told in their own voices. The work was commissioned for an exhibition of Indigenous art on the 500th anniversary of Columbus's arrival in Hispaniola. As such, it used Indigenous traditions of storytelling and passing on wisdom from elders as a way to push back against Native stereotypes and victimization.

==== Select works ====
- Twelve Angry Crinolines (1987), parade and video performance, Thunder Bay, Ontario, Canada. Collaboration with Ana Demetrakopoulos, Kim Erickson, Lori Gilbert, Joane Lachapelle-Bayak, Glenn McLeod, Karen Maki, Sandy Pandia and Lynne Sharman; organized by Lynne Sharman
- Artifact #671B (1988), protest in support of the Lubicon Cree and against the Olympic Flame celebrations, Thunder Bay, Ontario, Canada
- High-tech Teepee Trauma Mama (1988), performance installation, Indian Days Native Student Association Winter Carnival, Lakehead University, Thunder Bay Ontario, Canada
- HOWUH! (1988), music based performance project with Allen De Leary, Definitely Superior Art Gallery and Thunder Bay Indian Friendship Centre, Thunder Bay, Ontario, Canada
- Nah-doe-tah-moe-win: Means an Object That You Listen To (1989), Niagara Artists Centre, Saint Catharines, Ontario, Canada; Galerie SAW Gallery, Ottawa, Ontario, Canada; Multi-media Works: A Native Perspective, AKA Gallery, Saskatoon, Saskatchewan, Canada
- August 29, 1990 (1990), performance, Première Biennale d'art actuel de Québec, Le Lieu, Quebec City, Quebec, Canada
- Ayum-ee-aawach Oomama-mowan: Speaking to Their Mother (1991), performance, Walter Phillips Gallery, The Banff Centre, Banff, Alberta, Canada; toured to numerous locations across Canada (1991–1996)
- Creation or Death: We Will Win (1991), performance, IV Bienal de la Habana, Havana, Cuba
- Mawa-che-hitoowin: A Gathering of People for Any Purpose (1992), mixed-media installation, "Land/Spirit/Power" exhibition, National Gallery of Canada, Ottawa, Ontario, Canada
- I am not a Fucken Squaw! (1993), performance, Distance education program student graduation banquet, Sioux Lookout, Ontario, Canada
- Affiliation/Affliction (1994), collaboration with Reona Brass, Rencontre internationale d'art performance (RIAP) de Quebec, Le Lieu, Quebec, Canada
- Tourist Act #1 (1995), participatory performance, Institute of American Indian Arts, Santa Fe, New Mexico, U.S.A
- Interview with the Ghost of Luna (1997), performance, "Apocalypso" artist's residency, The Banff Centre, Banff, Alberta, Canada
- Garden of Eden (1998), performance, Five New Works (untitled), Canadian Performance Art Tour, Germany
- Manifesto (1999), performance, TIME TIME TIME performance art festival, Fado Performance, Inc., Zsa Zsa Gallery, Toronto, Ontario, Canada
- The Indian Factory (2000), performance making an installation, High-tech Storytellers: An Interdisciplinary Aboriginal Art Project, Tribe/AKA Gallery, Saskatoon, Saskatchewan, Canada
- Wild (2001), House Guests: Contemporary Artists in the Grange, Art Gallery of Ontario, Toronto, Ontario, Canada
- Vigil (2002), performance, Talking Stick Aboriginal Art Festival, Full Circle First Nations Performance, Vancouver, British Columbia, Canada
- Tongue River (2003), performance collaboration with Bently Spang, Fado Performance, Inc., Toronto, Ontario, Canada
- Back to the Garden (2006), performance, Urban Shaman/ Ace Art, Inc., Winnipeg, Manitoba, Canada
- "Freeze" with Osvaldo Yero (2006), Nuit Blanche, Toronto, Ontario, Canada
- Painted Road (2007), performance, gravel road behind the Art Gallery of Sudbury, Laurentian University, Sudbury, Ontario, Canada
- Making Always War (2008), performance, performance assistant: Daina Warren, Morris and Helen Belkin Art Gallery, University of British Columbia, Vancouver, British Columbia, Canada

=== Exhibitions ===
==== Select solo exhibitions ====
- Artifact #671B (1988), Thunder Bay, Ontario, Canada
- Crazy Old Woman Child (1988), Indian Friendship Centre, Thunder Bay, Ontario, Canada
- I'm a High-Tech Teepee Trauma Mama (1988), Native Student Council, Lakehead University, Thunder Bay, Ontario, Canada
- Mushkegokwe/Swampwoman (1988), Women Against Military Madness, Minneapolis, Minnesota, USA
- Nah-doe-tah-moe-win (1989), Galerie Saw, Ottawa, Ontario, Canada
- Ayumee-aawach Oomama-Mowan: Speaking to Their Mother with Marjorie Beaucage (1992), XYZ, Toronto, Ontario, Canada
- Wana-na-wang-ong (1993), Contemporary Art Gallery, Vancouver, British Columbia, Canada
- I Wait for the Sun (1994), Faret Tachikawa Art Project, Art Front Gallery, Tokyo, Japan
- Tourist Act #1 (1995), Institute of American Indian Art, Santa Fe, New Mexico, USA
- Dreamers (1999), Keyano College Art Gallery, Fort McMurray, Alberta, Canada
- Many/One (1999), Optica, Montreal, Quebec, Canada
- on this ground (2000), Rhode Island School of Design Museum of Art, Providence, Rhode Island, USA
- Private Collection (2001), Pari Nadimi Gallery, Toronto, Ontario, Canada
- 33 Pieces (2001), organized by Blackwood Gallery, University of Toronto at Mississauga, Mississauga, Ontario, Canada; toured to Dunlop Art Gallery, Regina, Saskatchewan, Canada (2002); Parry Sound Station Gallery, Parry Sound, Ontario, Canada (2002); Definitely Superior Gallery, Thunder Bay, Ontario, Canada (2003); W.K.P. Kennedy Public Art Gallery, Capitol Centre, North Bay, Ontario, Canada (2003)
- The Named and the Unnamed (2002), organized by Morris and Helen Belkin Art Gallery, Vancouver, British Columbia, Canada; toured to Art Gallery of Ontario, Toronto, Ontario, Canada (2003); Kamloops Art Gallery, Kamloops, British Columbia, Canada (2004); Confederation Art Centre, Charlottetown, Prince Edward Island, Canada (2004); McMaster Museum of Art, McMaster University, Hamilton, Ontario, Canada (2006)
- Extreme (2003), Pari Nadimi Gallery, Toronto, Ontario, Canada
- Temperance (2004), Tribe, Saskatoon, Saskatchewan, Canada
- Untitled 1, 2, 3 (2005), grunt gallery, Vancouver, British Columbia, Canada
- The Capture of Mary March, Pari Nadimi Gallery, Toronto, Ontario, Canada`
- Parallel (2006), Urban Shaman/ Ace Art, Inc., Winnipeg, Manitoba, Canada
- cosi in cielo, cosi in terra (2006), Franco Soffiantino Arte Contemporanea, Turin, Italy
- Rebecca Belmore: Rising to the Occasion (2008), Vancouver Art Gallery, Vancouver, British Columbia, Canada
- March 5, 1819 (2008), The Rooms Provincial Art Gallery, St. John's, Newfoundland, Canada
- Rebecca Belmore: Facing the Monumental (2018), Art Gallery of Ontario, Toronto, Ontario, Canada

==== Selected group exhibitions ====
- 1988: Souvenir from the Northern Front, Mayworks, Toronto, Ontario, Canada
- 1988: See Jane Sew Strontium, Definitely Superior, Thunder Bay, Ontario, Canada
- 1988: The New Traditionalists, Definitely Superior, Thunder Bay, Ontario, Canada
- 1989: Changers: A Spiritual Renaissance, National Arts and Crafts Corporation, Ottawa, Ontario, Canada
- 1989: Broadcast, Definitely Superior, Thunder Bay, Ontario, Canada
- 1990: Biennale d'art actuel, Quebec City, Quebec, Canada
- 1990: Multi-Media Works: A Native Perspective, AKA, Saskatoon, Saskatchewan, Canada
- 1990: Telling Things, Art Metropole, Toronto, Ontario, Canada
- 1990: Young Contemporaries 90, London Regional Art Gallery, London, Ontario, Canada
- 1991: Bienal de la Habana, Havana, Cuba'
- 1991: Okanata, A Space, Toronto, Ontario, Canada
- 1991: Between Views, Walter Phillips Gallery, Banff, Alberta, Canada
- 1991: Interrogating Identity, Grey Art Gallery, New York, New York, USA'
- 1991: A Likeness, Agnes Etherington Art Centre, Kingston, Ontario, Canada
- 1992: Enduring Strength, Intermedia Arts and Two Rivers Gallery, Minneapolis, Minnesota, USA
- 1992: Land, Spirit, Power, National Gallery of Canada, Ottawa, Ontario, Canada
- 1992: Princesses, Indiennes, et Cowgirls: Stereotypes de la Frontiere, Oboro, Montreal, Quebec, Canada
- 1993: Stand, Erie, Pennsylvania, USA
- 1993: Margins of Memory, Art Gallery of Windsor, Windsor, Ontario, Canada
- 1994: Rencontre internationale d'art performance de Quebec, Le Lieu, Quebec City, Quebec, Canada
- 1994: Sixth Native American Fine Arts Invitational, The Heard Museum, Phoenix, Arizona, USA
- 1994: Faret Tachikawa Art Project, Tokyo, Japan
- 1995: Longing and Belonging: From the Faraway Nearby, Santa Fe, New Mexico, USA
- 1995: History 101: The Re-Search for Family, St. Louis, Missouri'
- 1996: Liaisons, The Power Plant, Toronto, Ontario, Canada
- 1996: Metissages, Galerie Optica, Montreal, Quebec, Canada
- 2012: Shapeshifting: Transformations in Native American Art, Peabody Essex Museum, Salem, Massachusetts, USA
- 2018-2019: Art for a New Understanding: Native Voices, 1950s to Now, Crystal Bridges Museum of American Art, Bentonville, Arkansas, USA
- 2019: Hearts of Our People: Native Women Artists, Minneapolis Institute of Art, Minneapolis, Minnesota, USA
- 2022: Quiet As Its Kept: Whitney Biennial, Whitney Museum, New York City, New York, USA

=== Awards, honours and residencies ===
Belmore has been awarded membership in the Royal Canadian Academy of Arts. In 2004, Belmore completed a residency with MAWA (Mentoring Artists for Women's Art) in Winnipeg, Manitoba. In 2005, she won the Victor Martyn Lynch-Staunton Award from the Canada Council. and she was the first Indigenous woman representing Canada at the Venice Biennale. Also in 2005, OCAD University conferred an honorary doctorate. She is a Governor General's Award in Visual and Media Arts (2013), as well as the recipient of the 2016 Gershon Iskowitz Prize and an honorary doctorate from Emily Carr University in 2018. In 2024 Belmore was the recipient of the Audain Prize for the Visual Arts.

=== Further reading ===
- Belmore, Rebecca . "Five Sisters." In Indian Princesses and Cowgirls: Stereotypes from the Frontier. Burgess, Marilyn and Guthrie Valaskakis, Gail, Montreal: Oboro, 1995. ISBN 2-9800725-9-31
- Augaitis, Daina; Ritter, Kathleen (2008). Rebecca Belmore: Rising to the Occasion. Vancouver: Vancouver Art Gallery. ISBN 9781895442687.
- Bradley, Jessica; Jolene Rickard; Scot Watson (2005). Rebecca Belmore: Fountain. Kamloops Art Gallery, Morris and Helen Belkin Art Gallery, Biennale di Venezia. Vancouver: Morris and Helen Belkin Art Gallery, University of British Columbia. ISBN 9780888656346.
- Blondeau, Lori, et al. "On the Fightin’ Side of Me: Lori Blondeau and Lynne Bell in conversation with Rebecca Belmore." Fuse Magazine, Vol. 28, No. 1. pp. 25–34.
- Luna, James; Townsend-Gault, Charlotte (2003). Rebecca Belmore: The Named and the Unnamed. Morris and Helen Belkin Art Gallery, University of British Columbia. ISBN 0-88865-628-9.
- Bradley, Jessica. "Rebecca Belmore: Art and the Object of Performance." In Caught in the Act: An Anthology of Performance Art by Canadian Women. Tanya Mars and Johanna Householder, eds. Toronto: YYZ Books, 2004.
- Bailey, Jann LM Bailey; Watson, Scott (2005). Rebecca Belmore: Fountain. Kamloops Art Gallery, Morris and Helen Belkin Art Gallery, University of British Columbia. ISBN 0-88865-634-3.
- Enright, Robert. “The Poetics of History: An Interview with Rebecca Belmore”, Border Crossings, Vol. 24, No. 3, 2005.
- Burgess, Marilyn. "The Imagined Geographies of Rebecca Belmore." Parachute, No. 93, Jan/Feb/March, 1999. pp. 12–20.
- Fisher, Barbara (2001). 33 Pieces. University of Toronto at Mississauga, Blackwood Gallery. ISBN 0-77278203-2.
- Hill, Richard William. "It’s Very Interesting if it Works: In Conversation with Rebecca Belmore and James Luna." Fuse Magazine, Vol. 24, No. 1, 2001. pp. 28–33.
- "Built on Running Water: Rebecca Belmore's Fountain." Fuse Magazine. Vol. 29, No. 1, 2006. pp. 49–51.
- Martin, Lee-Anne. “The Waters of Venice: Rebecca Belmore at the 51st Biennale.” In Canadian Art, vol. 22, 2005.
- Mayrhofer, Ingrid (2006). Ephemeral Monuments: The Interventions of Rebecca Belmore and César Saez. Ottawa: Galerie SAW Gallery.
- Townsend-Gault, Charlotte and James Juna (2002). Rebecca Belmore: The Named and the Unnamed. Vancouver: Morris and Helen Belkin Art Gallery. ISBN 9780888656285.
- Laurence, Robin (August 2002). Racing Against History: The Art of Rebecca Belmore. Canada: Border Crossing Magazine, Volume 21, Number 3. Figures and Faces (#83). Pages 42-48.
- Nanibush, Wanda (2018). Rebecca Belmore: Facing the Monumental. Toronto: Art Gallery of Ontario; Fredericton, Goose Lane Editions. ISBN 978-1-988788-03-6.
- Belmore, Florene ed. (2019). Wordless: The Performance Art of Rebecca Belmore Vancouver, Grunt Gallery; Whistler, Audain Art Museum. ISBN 978-1-988860-06-0
- Ahlberg, Yohe J, and Teri Greeves. Hearts of Our People. Native Women Artists. Seattle: University of Washington Press, 2019. Print. http://www.worldcat.org/oclc/1105604814
- Belmore, Florene; Martin, Lee-Ann (1994). Wawa-na-wang-ong: Rebecca Belmore. Vancouver: Contemporary Art Gallery. ISBN 0-920751-49-0.
- Beard, Laura. "Playing Indian in the works of Rebecca Belmore, Marilyn Dumont, and Ray Young Bear." American Indian Quarterly, no. 4 (2014): 492–511. https://doi.org/10.5250/amerindiquar.38.4.0492.
- Kalbfleisch, Elizabeth. "Women, House, and Home in Contemporary Canadian Aboriginal Art: Hannah Claus, Rebecca Belmore, and Rosalie Favell." Frontiers: A Journal of Women Studies 33, no. 3 (2012): 1-30. https://doi.org/10.5250/fronjwomestud.33.3.0001
