= Whess Harman =

Canadian First Nations artist

- Born: 1990 (age 35–36); Prince Rupert, BC
- Education: Bachelor of Fine Arts
- Alma mater: Emily Carr University of Art and Design
- Known for: drawing, beadwork, textiles, curation, writing
- Website: https://www.whessharman.com

Whess Harman (born 1990) is a multidisciplinary Indigenous artist, curator, writer, and activist based in Vancouver, British Columbia.

== Biography ==
Whess Harman (he/they) was born in Prince Rupert, British Columbia and is a member of the Carrier Wit'at Nation (known under the Canadian government as part of the Lake Babine Nation). In 2014, he obtained a Bachelor of Fine Arts in Visual Arts from Emily Carr University of Art and Design. From January 2021 to March 2025, Harman was grunt gallery's curator, having previously worked there as curatorial assistant.

== Artistic and curatorial practice ==
Harman's artistic practice includes drawing and illustration, beadwork, textiles, humour, zines, and wordplay. He often references his identity as a queer, trans member of Carrier Wit’at nation living away from his territories and his involvement in the punk music scene. His work explores the ways in which art can be used as a tool of resistance, to interpret questions of identity and relation, and to prioritize internal community dialogue over colonial frameworks. His work is held in numerous collections, including at the Morris and Helen Belkin Art Gallery at the University of British Columbia.

Harman's curatorial practice prioritizes emerging queer and BIPOC cultural workers and artists.

== Select Artworks ==
In spring 2019, Harman developed the These Ones (formally Together Apart) zine series following the Together Apart, Queer Indigeneities 2S/Indigiqueer Symposium.

In 2020, Harman designed a "Land Back" sewn patch that was used in a collaboration with musical group The Halluci Nation as the cover for a song with the same title.

Harman's text-based works, including his 2020 mural Body as Vessel/Body as Blockade, are often intentionally difficult to read, forcing the viewer to slow down and put in the labour to decipher what is being said. This work is a response to the frequent question of anyone doing land defense work being asked why they do it.

== Select Exhibitions ==
=== Solo Exhibitions ===
- Potlatch Punk World Tour, Neutral Ground, Regina, April 5 - May 31, 2025
- chew the bones, they’re soft, Open Space, Victoria, February 5 - April 30, 2022
- Lossy: How to Save File for Future Transmission, Fina Gallery, University of British Columbia Okanagan, Kelowna, June 11 - September 10, 2021

=== Group Exhibitions ===
- Somewhere We Have Travelled: Indigenous Alumni Exhibition, Emily Carr University of Art and Design, Vancouver, February 20 - March 20, 2026
- Land Back Rewind, Vines Den, Vancouver, April 19 - 29, 2025
- XIÁM, Bill Reid Gallery, Vancouver, February 7 - May 19, 2024
- Gutters are Elastic, Nanaimo Art Gallery, Nanaimo, July 15 - September 24, 2023
- Start Somewhere Else, Morris and Helen Belkin Art Gallery, University of British Columbia, Vancouver, June 16 - August 14, 2022
- Sensing of the Wound, Or Gallery, Vancouver, March 5 - April 30, 2022
- Distortions and Echo, Vancouver Art Gallery, Vancouver, May 29, 2021 - January 3, 2022
- Exploring Care, Part 2: Holding Space, Campbell River Art Gallery, Campbell River, June 1 - August 28, 2021
- LAND BACK, Open Space, Victoria, October 9, 2020 - January 16, 2021

== Select Bibliography ==
- "Body as Blockade," c magazine, Issue 161, August 2025
- BEING GOOZ!, Catalogue published by UBC Okanagan Gallery, 2021
