= Cornelia Wyngaarden =

Canadian artist (born 1942)

- Born: The Hague, Netherlands
- Known for: Mixed media artist, new media artist

Cornelia Wyngaarden (born 1942) is a Canadian media artist based in Vancouver, British Columbia. She creates works in video, sculpture, and installation, and has played a significant role in the development and institutionalization of new media in Vancouver.

== Artistic career ==
Wyngaarden has worked in various artist-run centres in Vancouver as a bookkeeper, editor, grant writer, administrator, photographer, fundraiser, and artist. Her video-based installations and single channel videotapes explore feminist themes, issues of gender, sexuality, technology, and the ways in which history and social conditions have complicated women's rights. She juxtaposes technological media with human subject matter to extend the interpretive possibilities of her work.

Wyngaarden's work also addresses cross-dressing either overtly or subtextually, in order to deconstruct stereotypes and power relations. Employing lived experience, queer theory, and "forgotten" history and cultural mythology, her video installations also create an arena for queer representation.

== Artworks ==
=== As A Wife Has A Cow ===
Originally installed in 1985 and remastered in 2015, the work is a video portrait of the life of a rancher named Keely Moll. Exploring her confidence and life through her perspective, this work shifts the Western gender paradigm of a man in the landscape by restituting female imagery. Her view is accompanied by a complex network of family relations, the land, labour and community; aspects that the Western Front Gallery has considered "facets of a life well lived."

=== Apollo's Kiss/Matricide: An Allegorical Landscape ===
Originally installed in 1991 and remastered in 2015, Apollo's Kiss/Matricide: An Allegorical Landscape is a lightbox photograph taking inspiration from Aeschylus's Oresteia, spotlighting the tragic fate of Cassandra. Her representation of the female protagonist challenges the dominant male order. The market value of this work is estimated at $2,500.

=== Forged Subjectivity ===
Forged Subjectivity is an exhibition employing multiple screens, photo-transparencies, paintings, medical artifacts, and text to expose the compulsory nature of identifying and institutionalizing sexual difference, and the consequent perpetuation of gender roles. Constructing a fictional biography of a cross-dressing Member of Parliament named John White, née Eliza McCormick, Wyngaarden erodes masculine and heterosexual influences in the writing of history. John White's life is used as an entry point into the examination of the omission of cross-dressed women and lesbians from collective history.

=== The Fragility of Origins ===
The Fragility of Origins is a 1994 video-based installation focusing on women's bodies in relation to art, historical practice, and other theoretical discourses. Through the combination of video, baroque painting allusions, photography, and text, Wyngaarden critiques many postmodern positions at a moment where marginalized subjects are becoming authors themselves.

== Notable exhibitions ==
- 1985 - As A Wife Has A Cow, Time Based Arts, The Hague & Kunstuitleen-Delft, The Netherlands.
- 1986 - As A Wife Has A Cow, Luminous Sites, Vancouver, BC.
- 1988 - Blurred Lines In The Vernacular, Arts Science and Technology Centre/ Or Gallery, Vancouver, BC.
- 1988 - As A Wife Has A Cow, A Space, Toronto, ON.
- 1989 - As A Wife Has A Cow, Kamloops Art Gallery, Kamloops, BC.
- 1991 - Apollo's Kiss/Matricide: An Allegorical Landscape, UBC Fine Arts Gallery, Vancouver, BC.
- 1993 - Forged Subjectivity, Presentation House, North Vancouver, BC.
- 1994 - The Fragility of Origins, Western Front Society, Vancouver, BC.

== Awards ==
She received the VIVA Award in 1998, from the Jack and Doris Shadbolt Foundation for the Visual Arts.

== Permanent collections ==
Wyngaarden has work in the permanent collections of The National Gallery of Canada, The Canada Council Art Bank, 49th Parallel Gallery in New York, and The California College of Art.
