= Elizabeth McIntosh (artist) =

Canadian painter (born 1967)

Elizabeth McIntosh (born 1967, Simcoe, Ontario) is a Canadian painter. Her work explores geometric abstraction. Her work is in the permanent collection of the National Gallery of Canada and Art Gallery of Ontario. She lives and works in Vancouver.

== Education ==
McIntosh received her Honors BFA from York University in Toronto, and her MFA from Chelsea College of Art, London, UK.

== Work ==
McIntosh has exhibited widely in Canada and the United States including solo exhibitions at Diaz Contemporary (2008, 2010, 2012, 2014), Contemporary Art Gallery (Vancouver) (2010), Blanket Contemporary Gallery in Vancouver (2008), and Parisian Laundry in Montreal (2007). Group exhibitions include Two Women: Elizabeth McIntosh and Mina Totino, Model, Vancouver (2014), Persian Rose, Chartreuse Muse, Vancouver Grey, Equinox Gallery, BC PAINT at the Vancouver Art Gallery, and Spell: A Travelling Exhibition of Contemporary Abstraction at the Mendel Art Gallery in Saskatoon. She is represented by Diaz Contemporary. Her work is primarily characterized by large scale abstract and figurative compositions that draw from modern, art historical sources and often blur the border between abstraction and representation.

McIntosh is an associate professor in the Faculty of Visual Art + Material Practice at the Emily Carr University of Art and Design.

== Selected collections ==
- National Gallery of Canada
- Art Gallery of Ontario

== Selected awards ==
- International Residency Program in Visual Arts] (2014/15)
- VIVA Award (2013)
- Canada Council for the Arts Project Grant to Visual Artists (2009)
- Steam Whistle Arts Award: Best Painting Exhibition (2003)

== Selected exhibitions ==
- "Elizabeth McIntosh : Fairy Bread," Diaz Contemporary (2014)
- Violet's Hair, Elizabeth McIntosh, Contemporary Art Gallery, Vancouver (2011)
- Cut Out, Goodwater, Toronto (2009)
- Fire at Full Moon, Blanket Contemporary Art, Vancouver (2007)
- Young Night Thought, Diaz Contemporary, Toronto (2006)
