= Samuel Roy-Bois =

- Born: September 30, 1973 (age 52); Quebec City, Quebec
- Occupations: Artist; Musician; Performer

Samuel Roy-Bois (born September 30, 1973) is a Quebecois artist, musician, and performer. Roy-Bois is interested in the deconstruction of space, questioning and redefining the boundaries between art and exhibition spaces.

== Career ==
Roy-Bois holds a BFA from Université Laval, and in 2001, he received his MFA from Concordia University. Roy-Bois lives in Vancouver, British Columbia, Canada and is an assistant professor of sculpture at the University of British Columbia Okanagan Campus in Kelowna.

== Exhibitions ==
- 2020 Samuel Roy-Bois: Presences at Kamloops Art Gallery, Kamloops, BC.
- 2015 La pyramide at Œil de Poisson, Quebec City.
- 2010 Candid at Republic Gallery.
- 2008 Contemporary Art Gallery, Vancouver.
- 2006 Improbable and Ridiculous at the Musée d'art contemporain de Montréal, Montreal.
- 2003 j'ai entendu un bruit, je me suis sauvé (I heard a noise and I ran) at Or Gallery, Vancouver.
