= Skeena Reece =

Canadian First Nations artist (born 1974)

- Born: 1974 (age 51–52); Tsimshian Territory, Canada
- Known for: Performance art, songwriting, and video art
- Movement: Pacific Northwest Art, First Nations art, Performance art
- Awards: REVEAL Indigenous Art Award, VIVA Award

Skeena Reece (born 1974) is a Cree, Tsimshian, Gitksan, and Métis artist based in Canada whose multi-disciplinary practice includes such genres as performance art, "sacred clowning," songwriting, and video art.

== Background ==
Skeena Reece was born in 1974 to Red Power movement activist Cleo Reece and internationally renowned carver Victor Reece. She studied at Freda Diesing School of Northwest Coast Art and later at the Emily Carr University of Art and Design for media arts. She has been working in the arts since 1996 and is currently based out of Vancouver Island. She has also worked in administrative capacities at arts institutions such as the grunt gallery, where she worked as a curatorial practices intern. Reece is the founder of the Native Youth Artists Collective, and was Director of the Indigenous Media Arts Group from 2005 to 2007.

== Artistic practice ==
"I wanted to create this thing that was spiritually intangible and could only be seen as something if you were here right now. And nobody can take it, or even think about it or write about it or read about it later, you’ve kinda gotta be in it. It was just so magical I was like ‘that’s enough. It doesn’t have to go anywhere from here." - Skeena Reece, 2012

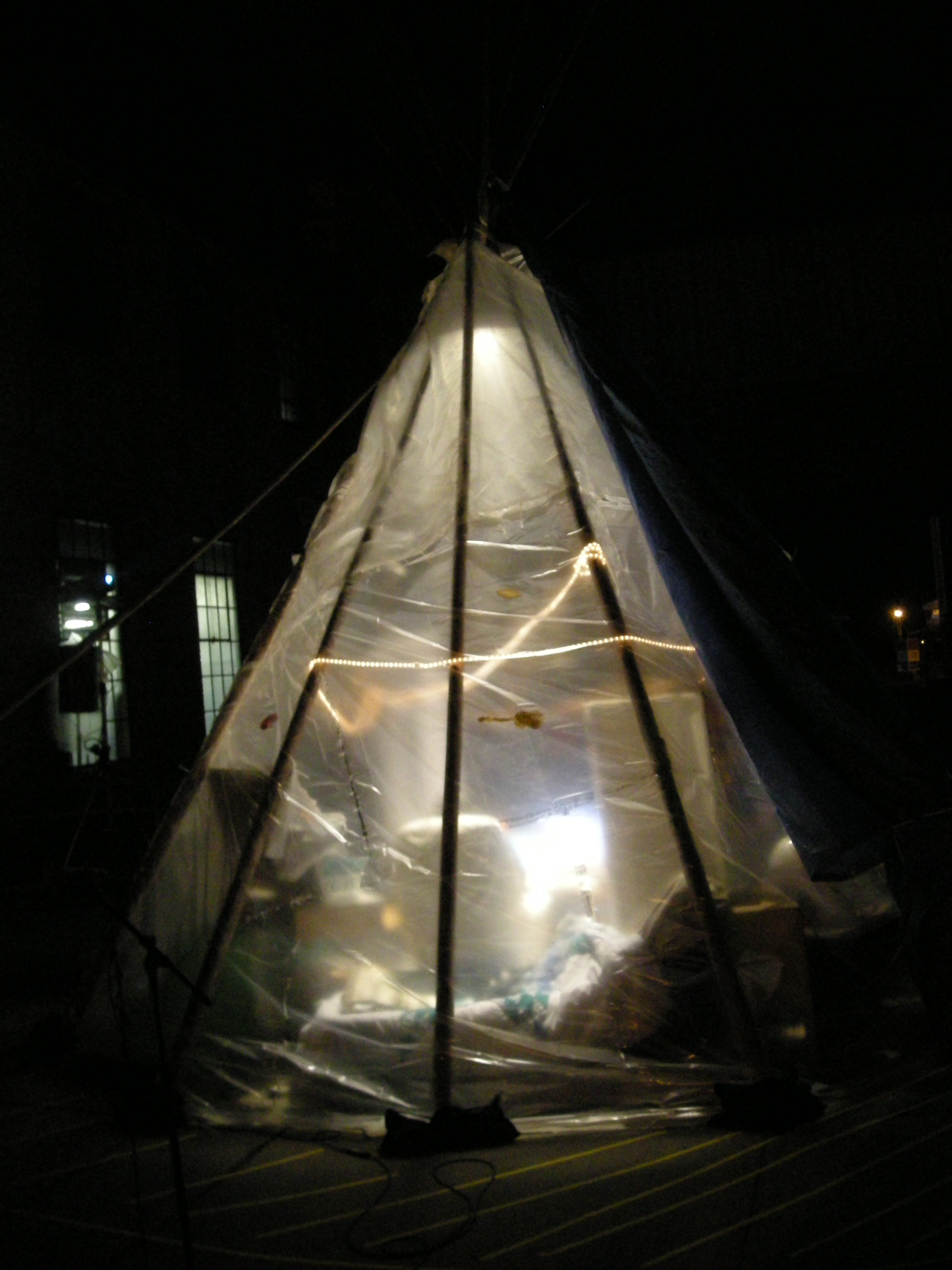
Please Do Not Disturb (2009) by Skeena Reece

Reece is known for making works that deal with issues surrounding settler colonialism and its consequences on Indigenous peoples, especially women. Often these works unsettle and challenge their audiences. She also closely aligns herself and her artistic practice with the figure of the “sacred clown”, a Hopi Indian figure who teaches lessons in uncouth ways. She bases her work on trickster figures such as Coyote and Raven, who is seen as both a prankster, but also as wise. For example, in her performance, Raven on the Colonial Fleet (2010), she “wears a corset, skirt and blanket designed with reference to traditional Northwest Coast Aboriginal Art and a feathered headdress referencing the Plains cultures.” Reece uses such regalia to make a political statement and to overturn Indigenous gender roles, for example by wearing a headdress that is usually reserved for men. Images of grenades, arms, and mythological figures cover her clothing to represent her as a “fe/male warrior” and as a mythological figure, like Raven, coming to help fight against colonial violence. In 2010, she also performed this piece at the 17th Biennale in Sydney, Australia. As well, in a 2008 performance for the National Museum of the American Indian based on an episode of the television show, Moesha, she dressed up as a nurse and asked the audience, "Does anyone want to share any feelings you have about being a colonizer?" She proceeded to have another artist bring out a bucket of red paint in which he begins to paint “one of Columbus's ships on a large board as Reece speaks about sexual fetishes, fear of government and the inaccurate portrayal of Indians on television.” Reece saw this “as a metaphor for white people taking the blood of her people and painting their own history of them.” One song in her album Sweetgrass and Honey was created to honor carvers like her father and the Nuu-chah-nulth carver John T. Williams in Seattle that was shot by a police officer.

On these issues, her work also deals with the act of caring and reconciliation. Such themes can be seen in her work Touch Me (2013), a video work made specifically for the 2013 exhibition, Witnesses: Art and Canada’s Indian Residential Schools. The fourteen minute video consists of Reece bathing Ukrainian-Canadian artist Sandra Semchuk. In the video, Reece washes Semchuk with a soap and cloth. Semchuk begins to tear up as Reece says “It’s okay, it’s okay.” The film is influenced by her distant relationship with her parents, who were both Canadian Residential School survivors. The film is meant to be an act of reconnection between mother and daughter, child and elder, “wanting to create a space in which touch, intimacy, and connection were animated, as well as a desire to perform a nurturing and loving act of bathing an elder inspired Reece to create this performance.” She also starred in a prominent role in the short film Savage (2009) about residential schools, along with Ta’kaiya Blaney, Doug Blamey, and Jennifer Jackson. The video won several awards including 2010 Genie award for Best Short Film, a Golden Sheaf Award for Best Multicultural Film, the ReelWorld Outstanding Canadian Short Film, and the Leo Awards for Best Actress and Best Editing. Recently, she has also made adult-sized moss bags, similar to swaddle bags meant to carry babies. They are meant to symbolize the care that families and communities give to new members and they are also a reminder that we always need care in our lives.

== Exhibitions and performances ==
- 2025 – Touch Me, National Gallery of Canada, Ottawa, Ontario, Canada
- 2025 – Curve! Women Carvers on the Northwest Coast, Audain Art Gallery, Whistler, British Columbia, Canada
- 2024 – 1:1 Artists Select: Gabrielle L’Hirondelle Hill | Skeena Reece, Vancouver Art Gallery, Vancouver, British Columbia, Canada
- 2021 – Honey and Sweetgrass, Duke Hall Gallery of Fine Art, Harrisonburg, Virginia, USA
- 2020 – Àbadakone | Continuous Fire | Feu continuel, National Gallery of Canada, Ottawa, Ontario, Canada
- 2019 – Second Skin, Glenbow Museum, Calgary, Alberta, Canada
- 2019 – Surrounded: Skeena Reece, Morris and Helen Belkin Art Gallery, Vancouver, British Columbia, Canada
- 2018 – Sweetgrass and Honey, Plug In ICA, Winnipeg and at the Comox Valley Art Gallery, Winnipeg, Manitoba, Canada
- 2017 – Moss, Oboro Gallery, Montreal, Canada
- 2015 – The Sacred Clown and Other Strangers, Urban Shaman Contemporary Aboriginal Art, Winnipeg, Manitoba, Canada
- 2013 – Witnesses: Art and Canada’s Indian Residential Schools, Morris and Helen Belkin Art Gallery, Vancouver, British Columbia, Canada
- 2012 – BEAT NATION: Art, Hip Hop and Aboriginal Culture, Vancouver Art Gallery, British Columbia, Canada
- 2012 – Like a Boss, The Power Plant, Toronto, Ontario, Canada
- 2011 – Acting Out, Claiming Space, Modern Fuel Artist-Run Centre, Kingston, Ontario, Canada
- 2010 – The Beauty of Distance: Songs of Survival in a Precarious Age, 17th Biennale of Sydney
- 2009 – Please Do Not Disturb, Nuit Blanche, Toronto, Ontario, Canada
- 2009 – Vampyre Love Ball, LIVE Biennale, Vancouver, British Columbia, Canada
- 2008 – We Are All One, UBC Museum of Anthropology, Vancouver, British Columbia, Canada
- 2008 – It’s not TV, It’s Indians!, National Museum of the American Indian, Washington DC, United States

== Filmography ==
=== Acting roles ===
| Year | Title | Role | Notes |
|---|---|---|---|
| 2009 | Savage | Mother | Short film. Winner of 2010 Genie award for Best Short Film, a Golden Sheaf Award for Best Multicultural Film, the ReelWorld Outstanding Canadian Short Film, and the Leo Awards for Best Actress and Best Editing. |
| 2024 | Petroglyphs to Pixels | Self | Featured in a single episode of a 13-episode TV documentary series broadcast on APTN featuring multiple Indigenous artists and their work. |

== Awards ==
- 2017 – The Hnatyshyn Foundation, REVEAL: Indigenous Arts Award
- 2014 – VIVA Award, 2014
- 2012 – British Columbia Creative Achievement Foundation, Award for First Nations Art
