= Mina Totino =

Canadian painter (born 1949)

Mina Totino (born 1949) is a Canadian painter currently based in Vancouver, British Columbia. Totino's work has appeared in solo and group exhibitions in Montreal, Toronto and Berlin. She first came to prominence in the 1985 Young Romantics exhibition at the Vancouver Art Gallery. Totino's work is informed by contemporary criticism, especially literary and film criticism that have analyzed the position of the imaginary spectator.

== Life and education ==
Mina Totino was born in Greater Sudbury, Ontario. She obtained her BFA from Emily Carr Institute of Art and Design in 1982.

== Solo exhibitions ==
- Mina Totino: Flirt, Monica Reyes Gallery, 2023
- Twisting, Mónica Reyes Gallery, 2020
- Charles H. Scott Gallery, 2010
- Mina Totino, Morris and Helen Belkin Art Gallery, 1997
- Mina Totino – PAINTINGS, Contemporary Art Gallery, 1994

== Group exhibitions ==
- The Eyes Have Walls: Nicole Ondre and Mina Totino, West Vancouver Art Museum, 2020
- Vancouver Special: Ambivalent Pleasures, Vancouver Art Gallery, 2017
- Readymades, Gordon Smith Gallery of Canadian Art, 2016
- Young Romantics, Vancouver Art Gallery, 1995

== Curatorial work ==
In 2014, Mina Totino curated Persian Rose Chartreuse Muse Vancouver Grey at Equinox Gallery, Vancouver, BC. The exhibition proved significant in marking shifting attitudes and discussions around painting and abstraction.

== Writings ==
Mina Totino has an artist book, I Look Up, Volume One, 1997 – 2000, co-published by Charles H. Scott Gallery and Publication Studio Vancouver.

== Awards ==
Mina Totino alongside Skeena Reece received the Jack and Doris Shadbolt Foundation VIVA awards on April 11, 2014.

== Collections ==
Mina Totino's work is found in the collections of the Walter Phillips Gallery, Banff, AB; the Vancouver Art Gallery; and the Morris and Helen Belkin Art Gallery, Vancouver, BC.

== Publications ==
- Catherine M. Soussloff. Mina Totino: Colour Figurations in Mina Totino's Monochromes. Vancouver: Monica Reyes Gallery, 2023
- Scott Watson, et al. Mina Totino. Vancouver: Morris and Helen Belkin Art Gallery, 1997
