= Janet Dees =

American curator

Janet Dees is an American curator and art historian who is serving as the Assistant Director of Arts of the Smithsonian National Museum of African American History and Culture. Dees is an expert on African, African-American, and Spanish colonial art, having researched and taught the subjects in positions at the Metropolitan Museum of Art, the Rosenbach Museum and Library, and the Brooklyn Museum.

== Education ==
Dees received a BA in art history and African and African American studies from Fordham University and a MA in art history from the University of Delaware. Prior to her graduate studies, she worked as a museum educator for the Metropolitan Museum of Art and the African Burial Ground National Monument as well as assistant director for a contemporary art gallery in New York.

== Career ==
Dees held various curatorial positions at SITE Santa Fe beginning in 2008, and she was a PhD candidate at the University of Delaware, where she specialized in 18th–20th century American art history. At SITE, she was part of a four-member team that organized a Pan-American exhibition series on contemporary art named "SITElines: New Perspectives on the Art of the Americas". For SITE's twentieth anniversary, she helped to organize a series of projects featuring SITE's previous artists. Her work has been featured in publications of the Minneapolis Institute of Art, the National Museum of the American Indian, Radius Books, and SITE. Contemporary artists she has curated for include Janine Antoni, Gregory Crewdson, Amy Cutler, Ann Hamilton, Linda Montano, Sarah Oppenheimer and Rose B. Simpson.

In 2015, Dees joined the Mary and Leigh Block Museum of Art at Northwestern University in Illinois, where she served as the Steven and Lisa Munster Tananbaum Curator of Modern and Contemporary Art. Dees received a Curatorial Research Fellowship from the Andy Warhol Foundation for the Visual Arts for the fall of 2018, which was awarded to support new scholarship on contemporary artistic practice. She joined her current role at the Smithsonian National Museum of African American History and Culture in 2024.
