= Krista Belle Stewart =

First Nations visual artist

Krista Belle Stewart is a First Nations visual artist from Canada. Stewart works in a variety of formats, using archival materials, photographs, and collage.

== Early life ==
Stewart is from the Upper Nicola Band in the British Columbia interior region. Stewart's mother Seraphine was the first First Nations public health nurse in British Columbia; she was the subject of a Canadian Broadcasting Corporation documentary in 1967.

== Career ==
Stewart works with combinations of archival items, such as photographs and video, and various types of collage techniques and fiber art. One of her earlier projects, Self Portrait on a Canning Lid, worked with older photographic techniques, such as tintype, to create images referencing her cultural history and ethnography practices.

Her 2014 installation piece, Motion and Moment Always, reproduced a historical image of chiefs from the Nisga'a First Nations on the British Columbia coast as a weaving, working with Vancouver weaver Ruth Scheuing. This piece is combined with items such as a bucket containing soil from Douglas Lake, where Stewart was raised, as well as other archival items highlighting women's roles in First Nations cultures.

Stewart has had solo exhibitions at the SFU Galleries, Burnaby (2018–19), Nanaimo Art Gallery (2019), Kelowna Art Gallery (2016), and Contemporary Art Gallery, Vancouver (2015). Group exhibitions include In Search of Expo 67, Musée d'Art Contemporain, Montreal (2017), Vancouver Special: Ambivalent Pleasures at the Vancouver Art Gallery (2016–17), Where Does it Hurt?, at Artspeak, Vancouver (2014), Music from the New Wilderness, Western Front, Vancouver (2014), and Fiction/Nonfiction, Esker Foundation, Calgary (2013).

In 2019, Stewart's work Earthbound Mnemonic was featured on the BC Hydro Dal Grauer Substation in Vancouver as a feature of the Capture Photography Festival. Also in 2019, she was the recipient of the VIVA Award from the Jask and Doris Shadbolt Foundation.
