= Judy Chartrand =

Cree artist

Judy Chartrand (born 1959) is a Manitoba Cree artist, born in Kamloops, British Columbia, Canada. She is an artist who grew up in the Downtown Eastside neighbourhood of Vancouver, British Columbia. Her works frequently confront issues of postcolonialism, Indigenous feminism, socio-economic inequity, and Indigenous knowledge expressed through the mediums of ceramics, found objects, archival photography, and traditional Indigenous techniques of beadwork, moose hair tufting and quillwork.

== Life and work ==
Chartrand is a self-taught ceramicist. She was initially inspired by the Pueblo San Ildefonso potter Maria Martinez, whose instructional videos she initially learned from. Her early works were autobiographical, focussing on the tension between Indigenous and European culture in Vancouver. In her formative years, she was influenced by trips to the Vancouver Museum located at the Carnegie Community Centre in downtown Vancouver where she developed an awareness of the design and painting of ceramics.

An early motif utilized in her work was referencing Mimbres bowl forms and surface decoration, which is a design language she has referenced back to frequently in her work from renditions of historical Mimbres pots, to public art installation like the one done for the Olivia Skye Public Housing Building which featured illustrations of women in the style of Mimbres surface decoration.

Her series "If This is What You Call, 'Being Civilized', I'd rather go back to Being a 'Savage'" is an evolution of the Mimbres pots, keeping the same bowl form but adding more personalized surface decoration from the artist. It currently exists in the private collection of contemporary art collector Bob Rennie and the permanent collection of the Surrey Art Gallery.

Works have also been collected by the Glenbow Museum, the AMOCA in Pomona, California, the Gardiner Museum, the Museum of Anthropology, the Crocker Art Museum, and the Saskatchewan Arts Board. Her work has been included in anthologies on arts and crafts, including Utopic Impulses: Contemporary Ceramics Practice.

=== Education ===
Chartrand studied for her Diploma in the Fine Arts Program at Langara College before being accepted to the Emily Carr University of Art and Design where she graduated with her BFA in 1998. She continued on to finish her master's degree in Fine Arts in Ceramics at the University of Regina (2003).

=== Exhibitions ===
- Hot Clay: Sixteen West Coast Ceramic Artists, Vancouver, British Columbia: Surrey Art Gallery, 18 January – 28 March, 2004
- Playing With Fire, Vancouver, British Columbia: Museum of Anthropology, 2019
- the poets have always preceded, North Vancouver, British Columbia: Griffin Art Projects, 2019
- Bad Stitch: Audie Murray, Judy Chartrand, and Jeneen Frei Njootli Vancouver, British Columbia: Macaulay & Co. Fine Art, 2018
- What a Wonderful World, Vancouver, British Columbia: Bill Reid Gallery 2016–2017
- Métis Soup, Vancouver, British Columbia: Macaulay & Co. Fine Art, 2016
- Judy Chartrand 1999–2013, Saskatoon, Saskatchewan: AKA Artist Run, 2013
- Malaysia-Canada Indigenous Communities Applied Arts Exhibition, Vancouver, British Columbia: Pendulum Gallery, 2012
- Lost & Found: Haruko Okano, Judy Chartrand, and Wayde Compton Vancouver, British Columbia: Access Gallery, 2006
