= Jolene Rickard =

Tuscarora artist, curator and visual historian in New York, U.S. (born 1956)

- Born: 1956 (age 69–70)
- Citizenship: Tuscarora Nation
- Education: B.F.A., Rochester Institute of Technology; M.F.A., Buffalo State College
- Alma mater: Ph.D., University of Buffalo (SUNY)
- Known for: Curation at Smithsonian National Museum of the American Indian; Photography
- Awards: Ford Foundation Research Grant; Cornell University Society of the Humanities Fellowship

Jolene Rickard (born 1956) citizen of the Tuscarora Nation, Turtle clan, is an artist, curator, and visual historian at Cornell University, specializing in Indigenous peoples issues. Rickard co-curated two of the four permanent exhibitions for the Smithsonian's National Museum of the American Indian.

== Biography ==
Rickard, granddaughter of Tuscarora chief Clinton Rickard, was born in 1956 at Niagara Falls, New York. In 1977 Jolene Rickard attended the London College of Printmaking. She received her BFA from the Rochester Institute of Technology and in 1991 she graduated with an MA from Buffalo State College. Rickard earned her Ph.D. in American Studies with a Native component from the University at Buffalo (SUNY) in 1996. After her education and having worked as a television art director and graphic designer, she moved back to the Tuscarora Reservation in upstate New York.

Well known pieces by the artist include 3 Sisters, a 1989 black-and-white photograph and color xerox (the artist's sleeping face interposed with squash, beans and corn, the Three Sisters staple crops); and I See Red in the 90's, a 1992 six-panel photograph series in protest of the quincentenary of Columbus' landing in America, also including a self-portrait. Her ...the sky is darkening (2018), which incorporates beadwork by older traditional and contemporary artists, considers "deep reclamation of land by the Cayuga..." She sees her photography as ultimately linked to "the manipulations of light and texture and the representations of cosmological space and spirituality of earlier generations of Iroquois beadwork artists".

== Academic career ==
Rickard is currently an associate professor in the Department of Art History and American Indian and Indigenous Studies at Cornell University, and serves as the director of the American Indian and Indigenous Studies Program. She also served as interim chair for the Art Department at Cornell between 2009 and 2010.

== Curatorial projects ==
- Deskaheh in Geneva, 1923-2023: Defending Haudenosaunee Sovereignty (2023), Geneva Switzerland
- Smithsonian National Museum of the American Indian, inaugural exhibitions: Our Peoples (2004–2014) and Our Lives (2004–2015), Washington, DC.
- Across Borders: Beadwork in Iroquois Life. Co-Curator. Collaboration with Dr. Ruth Phillips, Kanataka, Kanien'kehaka Raotitiohkwa Cultural Center and McCord Museum, Quebec, 1995–99.

== Selected exhibitions ==
- Red River Crossing, visiting curator, Gary Sholette, The Swiss Institute, New York City, November 1996
- Reservation X, curated by Gerald McMaster, Curator of Contemporary Art, Canadian Museum of Civilization, QC, April 1998
- Native Nations, curated by Jane Allison, Barbican Art Center, London, U.K., October 1998
- New Voices/New Visions, curated by Janeen Antone, Ansel Adams Center for Photography, San Francisco, California, October 1998
- Lifeworlds – Artscapes: Contemporary Iroquois Art, curated by Sylvia S. Kasprycki and Doris I. Strambrau, Museum Der Weltkulturen, Germany, February 2004
- Western New York and Beyond Exhibition, Albright Knox, curated by Louis Grachos, Buffalo, New York, June 2005
- The American West, curated by Jimmie Durham and Richard W. Hill, Compton Verney Gallery, Warwickshire, U.K., June through August, 2005
- Oh So Iroquois, curated by Ryan Rice, The Ottawa Art Gallery, Ontario, June 2007
- Hearts of Our People, Minneapolis Institute of Art, Minnesota, June-Aug 2019; Frist Museum, Nashville, Tennessee, Sept. 2019 – Jan. 2020; Renwick Gallery, Washington, D.C., Feb. – May 2020; and Philbrook Museum of Art, Tulsa, Oklahoma, June – Sept, 2020.
- Speaking with Light: Contemporary Indigenous Photography, Amon Carter Museum of American Art, Fort Worth, Texas, Oct 2022-Jan 2023.

== Awards ==
- Ford Foundation Research Grant
- Cornell University Society of the Humanities Fellowship on the thematic topic of "Global Aesthetics"; 2010-2011

== Bibliography ==
- Lynda Jessup, ed. (2002), "Indigenous is the Local", On Aboriginal Representation In The Gallery, Hull, Quebec: Canadian Museum of Civilization, OCLC 49352352
- "The Local and the Global", Vision, Space, Desire: Global Perspectives and Cultural Hybridity, National Museum of the American Indian (Smithsonian), 2006 Proceedings of conference held in Venice, Italy, December 2005
- Francesco Pellizzi; Ivan Gaskell, eds. (2007), Crossing Boundaries: Art Museums and Anthropology Museums in Search of Common Ground, Peabody Museum Press, OCLC 888596367
- J. C. H. King; Christian F. Feest, eds. (2007), "Haudenosaunee Art: 'In the Shadow of the Eagle.'", Three Centuries of Woodlands Indian Art: A Collection of Essays, Altenstadt: ZKF Publishers
- "Skin Seven Spans Thick", Hide: Skin as Material and Metaphor, Washington DC: National Museum of the American Indian, 2010

== See also ==
- Native American women in the arts
- Visual arts by indigenous peoples of the Americas
