= Tania Willard =

Indigenous Canadian multidisciplinary artist, graphic designer, and curator

- Born: 1977 (age 48–49); Kamloops, British Columbia, Canada
- Citizenship: Canadian Secwépemc
- Known for: Artist and Curator
- Website: https://www.taniawillard.ca/

Tania Willard (born 1977) is an Indigenous Canadian multidisciplinary artist, graphic designer, and curator, known for mixing traditional Indigenous arts practices with contemporary ideas. Willard is from the Secwepemc nation, of the British Columbia interior, Canada.

Willard was the co-curator for the art exhibition, Beat Nation: Art, Hip Hop and Aboriginal Culture, which toured in major galleries across Canada.

== Biography ==
Willard was born in 1977 and grew up in Armstrong, British Columbia, as well as back and forth to her father's Indian reserve. A formative moment in her life happened when she was 16 and selling fruit for her aunt at a powwow; while there she saw a group of kids breakdancing.

== Career ==
"Interconnectedness is the root system of my work as an artist. Land-based art, community engaged practice, printmaking, painting are the mediums I most often work in, these ways of working are tied to me, I am tied to my ancestors, we are tied to the land." - Tania Willard

Willard is an artist, graphic designer, and curator who focuses on mixing traditional Indigenous arts practices with contemporary ideas, often working with bodies of knowledge and skills that are conceptually linked to her interest in intersections between Aboriginal and other cultures. In the opening essay to Willard's exhibition, Claiming Space, at the Kamloops Art Gallery, Acting Director Beverley Clayton writes: "...inspired by geological landforms on traditional Secwépemc land and by other aspects of the place, Tania Willard's art work acts as a conduit between generations and cultures."

She works with oil and acrylic painting, printmaking, pen and ink drawing, watercolour, mixed media, and collage. She also makes public art, including a collaborative community mural with the artist Guillermo Aranda and the Secwépemc Native Youth Network entitled Neskonlith Mural, in 2013. Willard is a member of the artist collective New BC Indian Art and Welfare Society.

From 2013 to 2015, Willard was the Aboriginal Curator in Residence at the Kamloops Art Gallery. She is the recipient of the Hnatyshyn Foundation Visual Arts Awards for Curatorial Excellence in Contemporary Art. In 2017, Willard had a solo exhibition at the Burnaby Art Gallery entitled dissimulation. Tania Willard has also worked as an artist in residence at Gallery Gachet. In 2026, she was appointed Director of the Morris and Helen Belkin Art Gallery at the University of British Columbia in Vancouver.

== Curatorial work ==
=== Beat Nation: Art Hip Hop and Aboriginal Culture ===
Willard curated the exhibition project Beat Nation, which started as an online project for grunt gallery. It features visual art, videos, music, and writing.

Beat Nation the Exhibition toured starting in Vancouver to Toronto, Kamloops, Montreal, Halifax and Saskatoon. Willard states that, "it was a really important journey to take this exhibit to different places; the context of the exhibition is to present indigenous artists today who respond to both socio-political states of Indigenous peoples and struggles, as well as use a mix of quite contemporary mediums and ancestral ideas."

=== BUSH gallery ===
BUSH gallery is an experimental, land-based, and Indigenous-led artist residency that takes place on Willard's land in Secwépemc Nation in interior British Columbia.

In an issue of C Magazine guest-edited by Willard and Peter Morin the editors state: "BUSH gallery is a series of on-going gatherings of like-minded folks united under questions concerning art making, land, Indigenous art history and interventions into the colonial." This issue also included the BUSH Manifesto.

=== #callresponse ===
#callresponse is a multifaceted project, co-organized by Tarah Hogue, Maria Hupfield and Willard, and in partnership with grunt gallery, supported by the {Re}conciliation initiative of the Canada Council for the Arts, the J.W. McConnell Family Foundation, and The Circle on Philanthropy and Aboriginal Peoples in Canada. It includes a website, social media platforms, touring exhibition, and catalogue, which aim to strategically centre the vital presence of Indigenous women across multiple platforms. The project features five commissions from Indigenous women around Canada, including Willard, Christi Belcourt, Hupfield, Ursula Johnson, and Laakkuluk Williamson-Bathory. Each artist invited a guest, including Isaac Murdoch, IV Castellanos and Esther Neff, Cheryl L'Hirondelle, Marcia Crosby and Tanya Tagaq, to respond to their work.

== Exhibitions ==
=== Select artist exhibitions ===
- 2009 – Lore, group exhibition with Willard, Duane Linklater, and Jason Lujan at Foreman Art Gallery of Bishop's University & Gallery 101, Quebec
- 2009 – Claiming Space, solo exhibition, Kamloops Art Gallery, Kamloops, British Columbia
- 2013 – Witnesses: Art and Canada's Indian Residential Schools, Morris and Helen Belkin Art Gallery, Vancouver, British Columbia
- 2016 – Unsettled Sites, Simon Fraser University Gallery, Burnaby, British Columbia
- 2017 – Tania Willard: Dissimulation, Burnaby Art Gallery, Burnaby
- 2018 – The Shape of the Middle, Open Studio Contemporary Printmaking Centre, Toronto, Ontario
- 2019 – Hexsa'am: To Be Here Always, Morris and Helen Belkin Art Gallery at the University of British Columbia
- 2025 – Town + Country: Narratives of Property and Capital, Morris and Helen Belkin Art Gallery, Vancouver

=== Select curation exhibitions ===
- 2012 – Beat Nation: Art Hip Hop and Aboriginal Culture, travelling exhibition with the first show at the Vancouver Art Gallery, Vancouver, British Columbia, Canada (as co-curator).
- 2014 – unlimited edition, Kamloops Art Gallery.
- 2015 – CUSTOM MADE / Tsitslem te stem te ck'ultens-kuc, Kamloops Art Gallery.
- 2016 – Unceded Territories: Lawrence Paul Yuxweluptun, the Museum of Anthropology at UBC (as a co-curator)
- 2016 – Nanitch: Early Photographs of British Columbia from the Langmann Collection (as co-curator), Presentation House Gallery, renamed The Polygon Gallery, North Vancouver, Canada.
- 2016 – Work to Rule: Krista Belle Stewart, Kelowna Art Gallery.
- 2017 – Maureen Gruben: Stitching My Landscape, for Landmarks/Repères2017.
- 2026 – The Structure of Smoke, Morris and Helen Belkin Art Gallery (as co-curator with Melanie O'Brian).
