= Artspeak Gallery =

Coordinates: 49°16′58″N 123°06′16″W

Artspeak Gallery is an artist-run centre located in the Gastown neighbourhood in Vancouver, Canada. Founded in 1986, the stated aim of the gallery is to "explore visual art at the intersection of text and language." The name refers ironically to ‘artspeak,’ the insider terminology of artists, while aiming to create a welcoming and inclusive space. The Vancouver Sun called it one of Canada's leading artist-run galleries.

== History ==
Artspeak was founded in 1986 at the Kootenay School of Writing, a writer's collective in Vancouver. The artist run centre's founders were Jeff Derksen, an instructor at the Kootenay School; Cate Rimmer, a student at Emily Carr University of Art and Design; and artist Kay Higgins. Rimmer and Higgins initially ran the gallery as volunteers. The first collaboration between the gallery and Kootenay School was called Artists/Writers/Talks; and several of the other early exhibitions were themed around art books, papermaking, bookbinding, and related techniques. In 1987, the gallery became independent from the Kootenay School and moved to 311 West Hastings in downtown Vancouver.

In 1996, Artspeak Gallery purchased its current location at 233 Carrall Street, eventually becoming one of the few artist-run centres in Vancouver to own their space. The area around the gallery changed and gentrified significantly in the decades since they made the purchase, but they have so far refused offers to sell the space. Between 1999 and 2004, Lorna Brown was the director-curator of the gallery.

== Programming ==
Artspeak has run public programming since its founding, with a particular focus on books, language, publication and writing. An early exhibition on these themes was Behind the Sign, staged in 1988, featuring collaborations between artists and writers.

In 2004, Artspeak Gallery held a runway show fundraiser titled Fashionista. The gallery commissioned local artists for fashion items modelled on a runway, which were then auctioned with the proceeds benefiting the gallery.

In 2006, Marianne Nicolson exhibited her work Bakwin-a`tsi: The Container for Souls.

In 2008, an exhibition featured was titled Learn to Read Art: The History of Printed Matter. The exhibition featured artist's books from Printed Matter, a New York City based non-profit organization founded in 1976.

In the winter of 2025, Artspeak exhibited the works of Tiona Nekkia McClodden and Karice Mitchell in an exhibition titled A Rose into an Omen.

== Selected publications ==
- Domicile (by Susan Schuppli, Vancouver 1996)
- Shirin Neshat "Women of Allah", (Vancouver, 1997)
- Territory (Vancouver, 2008)
- Other Conundrums: Race, Culture, and Canadian Art (by Monika Gagnon, Vancouver, 2000)
- Tapetum lucidum (Vancouver, 2014)
- [The greatest stories ever told] (by Ho Tam, Vancouver 2021)
