= Grunt gallery =

grunt gallery

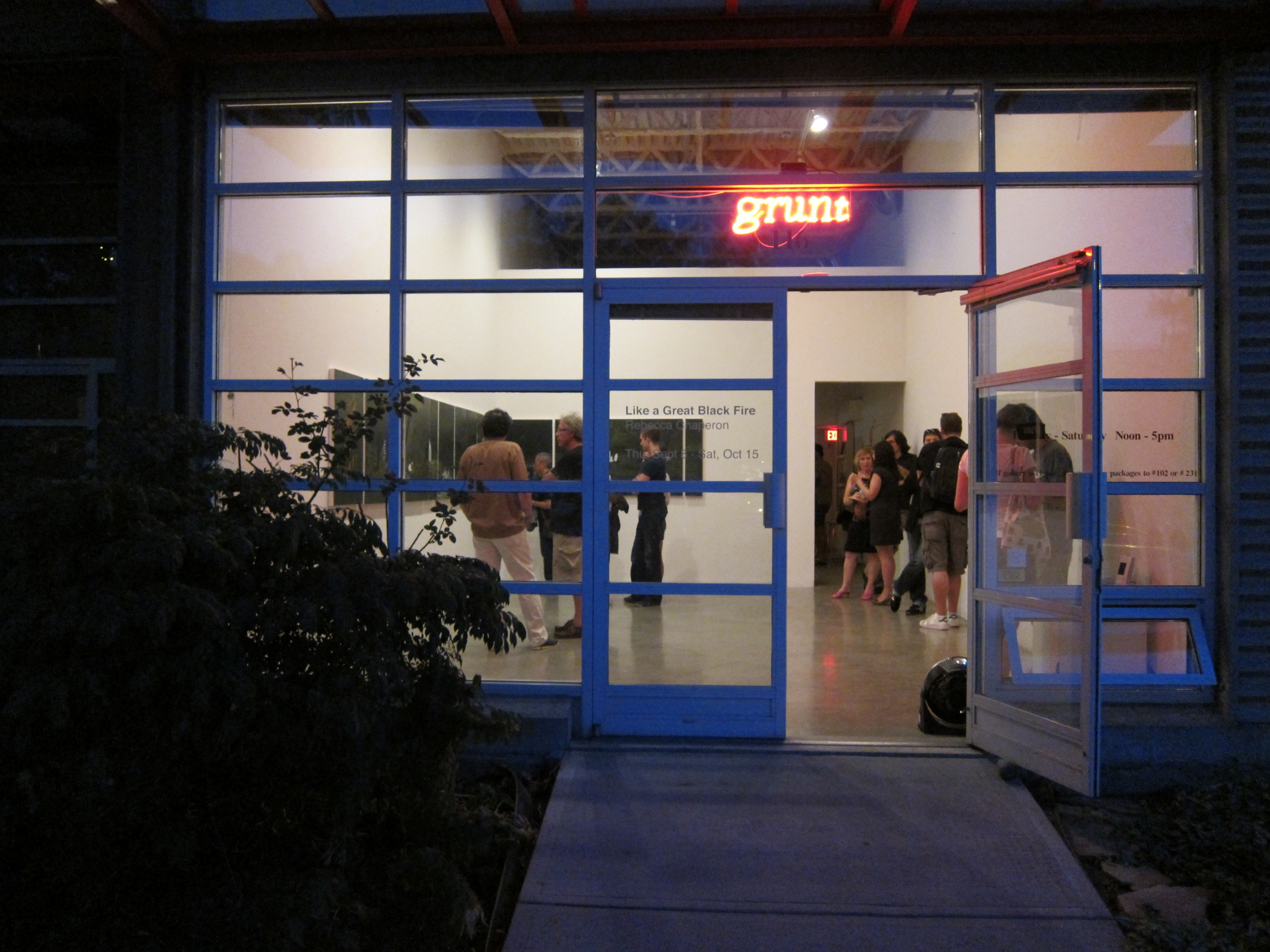
- Established: 1984
- Location: Mount Pleasant, Vancouver, British Columbia, Canada
- Type: art gallery
- Director: Vanessa Kwan
- Curator: Whess Harman
- Website: www.grunt.ca

The grunt gallery is a Canadian artist-run centre, founded in 1984 and located in Vancouver, British Columbia. They show work by both Indigenous and non-Indigenous artists.

== History ==
Established in 1984, and founded by Glenn Alteen, Kempton Dexter, Danielle Peacock, Susan MacKinley, Garry Ross, Dawn Richards, Billy Gene, Hillary Wood, and Daniel Olson. The grunt gallery was part of the second generation of Vancouver’s artist-run centres, such as Main Exit (1980–84), Unit/Pitt (1980-), Reflections (1982–83), Or Gallery (1983-), (N)on Commercial (1984–1985), the Convertible Showroom (1984–86), Artspeak (1986-), Clochard (1987-) and Gallery T.O.O (1988–89).

The first meetings for the Vancouver Fringe Festival happened at grunt gallery in 1985 and grunt was a venue for the festival until 1989. From 1987 until 1994 singer Kate Hammett Vaughan and guitarist Ron Samworth produce a weekly jazz improv series called Jazz in the Gallery. After 1990 grunt developed a number of Performance Series that ran at the same time as the Vancouver Fringe Festival including the 1990 Vancouver Performance Art Series, 1991 The Chicago Series, Performance Poets Series Masque of the Red Death and 1992 First Nations Performance Series. In 1993 Queer City Festival and Two Spirit Performance Series were produced. In 1994, grunt and artist Pat Beaton produced the Mount Pleasant Community Fence, one of Vancouver’s first engaged public art projects. In 1995, grunt produced the series Halfbred, that focused on issues of miscegenation, bisexuality and transgender communities with the Pitt Gallery. This is also the year when grunt obtained its own space. In 1996, production of the Mattering Map by Pia Masse, another engaged community public art focused on the working class diners of East Vancouver. In 1999, grunt produced Live at the End of the Century, a six-week performance festival celebrating the 20th Anniversary of the Living Art Festival in 1979. Thanks to this event’s success, grunt created "Live Biennial of Performance Art" in 2001, which still exists today. In 2008, grunt produced the Medicine Project, a website by Dana Claxton and Tania Willard. In 2009, the Vancouver Art in the 60’s web site was produced by Lorna Brown with the Morris and Helen Belkin Art Gallery at UBC. In 2010, grunt launched Media Lab Campaign and Activating The Archive Project begins. In 2011, the Media lab opened and ATA series of web site projects were developed. grunt gallery has exhibited artists such as Rebecca Belmore, Syrus Marcus Ware, Derya Akay, Aileen Bahmanipour, and Paul Wong.

== Involvement in First Nations Art ==
With over 20 years work with the First Nations artists’ communities, grunt’s archive contains documentary reproduction of many works: performances on video, black and white photography and exhibitions on slides, more recently accompanied by digital photography. The gallery specialized throughout the 1990s in First Nation’s artists of all levels of experience and media could exhibit their works. Among the important of the events developed by grunt gallery is, the 1997 computer generated performance "An Indian Act Shooting the Indian Act" by Lawrence Paul Yuxweluptun.

In 2002, grunt gallery produced the conference, Indian Acts - Aboriginal Performance Art with TRIBE. In 2005, as a part of LIVE Biennial, grunt created the community project Nova Library and also its first archival Website First Nations Performance. In 2006, grunt gallery launched the First Visions Project with three websites, this is also the year when Grunt Gallery Legacy Endowment was set up through the Vancouver Foundation. In 2007, Live In Public- The Art of Engagement Conference and Aboriginal Creators Project with websites by Lawrence Paul Yuxweluptun, Rebecca Belmore and Dana Claxton were created.

=== Beat Nation project ===
Working with a diverse group of artists and musicians, grunt gallery director Glenn Alteen initiated a project for an online gallery in 2008 and invited Tania Willard and Skeena Reece, Aboriginal artists and curators, both with ties to Aboriginal youth communities, to curate an online exhibition. Beat Nation took off, and continues to grow, from an art exhibition and performance at SAW Gallery as part of British Columbia art scene in Ottawa, Ontario to performance art events with Beat Nation artists in Saskatoon and co-curator Skeena Reece’s performance as part of the 2010 Sydney Biennale in Australia.
