= Contemporary Art Gallery (Vancouver) =

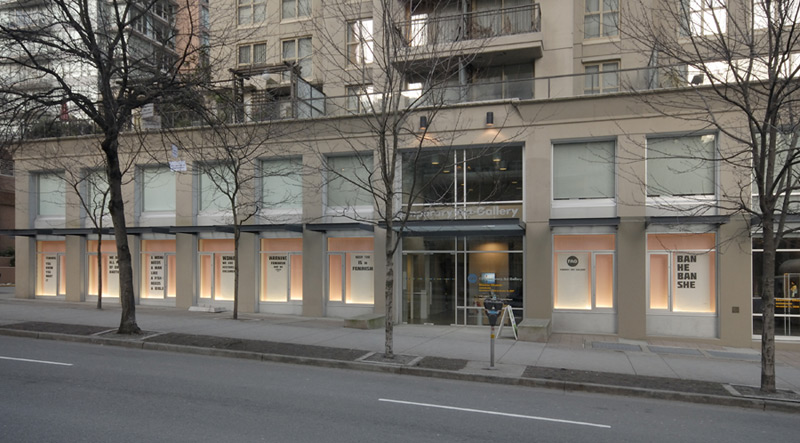

- Location in Metro Vancouver
- Established: 1971
- Location: Yaletown in Vancouver, British Columbia, Canada
- Coordinates: 49.279676°N 123.121547°W
- Type: Art gallery
- Director: Matthew Hyland
- Curator: Kimberly Phillips
- Website: www.contemporaryartgallery.ca

The Contemporary Art Gallery (CAG) is a non-profit public contemporary art gallery in downtown Vancouver. The CAG exhibits local, national, and international artists, primarily featuring emerging local artists producing Canadian contemporary art. It has exhibited work by many of Vancouver's most acclaimed artists, including Stan Douglas, Ian Wallace, Rodney Graham, Liz Magor, and Brian Jungen, and it continues to feature local artists such as Damian Moppett, Shannon Oksanen, Elspeth Pratt, Myfanwy MacLeod, Krista Belle Stewart and many others. International artists who have had exhibitions at the CAG include Dan Graham, Christopher Williams, Rachel Harrison, Hans-Peter Feldmann and Ceal Floyer. Other notable people that have curated or written for the CAG include Douglas Coupland, Beatriz Colomina, Roy Arden, and John Welchman. The gallery offers free admission to all visitors.

== History ==
Established in 1971, the Contemporary Art Gallery (originally called the Greater Vancouver Artist's Gallery) began as an outgrowth of the Social Planning Department of the City of Vancouver, in which Vancouver artists were hired for a six-month period to produce art for exhibition at the gallery, and for inclusion in the City of Vancouver Art Collection. In 1976, the CAG was incorporated as a registered federal charity and a non-profit society under the Societies Act of British Columbia. In 1984, the Contemporary Art Gallery became an artist-run centre. It was widely recognized for providing initial solo exhibitions and catalogues for many of Vancouver's now well-known artists. By the early 1990s, the exhibition program had expanded to include artists of national and international origin. In 1996, the Contemporary Art Gallery was transformed from an artist-run centre into an independent public art gallery, fulfilling the need for a contemporary visual arts institution with programming positioned between the vibrant experimentalism of Vancouver's artist-run centres and the more popular programs of large general-interest institutions. In May 2001, the Contemporary Art Gallery moved to a new purpose-built facility.

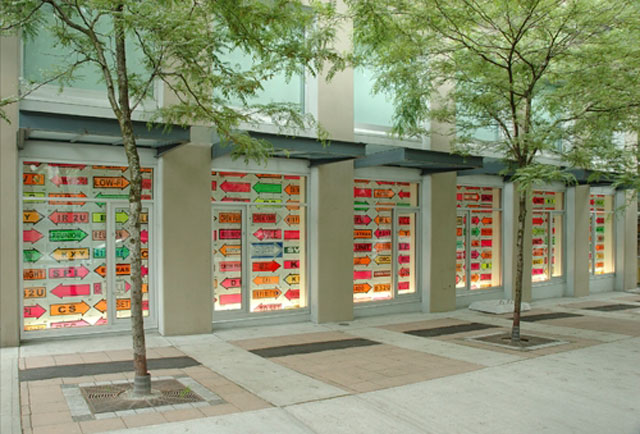
Production Postings exhibit by Christian Kliegel, at the gallery in 2006

In 2006, Vancouver artist Christian Kliegel's exhibit, "Production Postings," featured hundreds of signs that film and television production units had used to direct their casts and crews to filming locales; "the general design and style of these brightly coloured signs are formulaic and a ubiquitous part of Vancouver's urban landscape," reads the exhibit description. Film production companies claimed these signs as stolen property, the Vancouver police were contacted, and gallery officials were forced to take down some of the signs and replace them with photocopies. "If anything," Kliegel claimed, "the movie companies themselves practice location theft by setting a film in Vancouver and making it look like another city." Christina Ritchie, the gallery's Director, posted a letter addressed to Off-Set Rentals on the gallery's front door, telling the company's officials that she found it "sad and disappointing" that they could not appreciate Kliegel's "unique and insightful image of Vancouver."

== Building ==
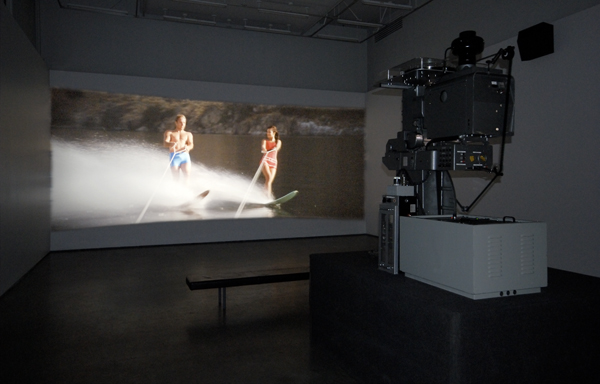
Shannon Oksanen's exhibit Summerland in one of the two galleries at the exhibition facility

The Contemporary Art Gallery is located in the ground floor and mezzanine of a residential condominium building at 555 Nelson Street, at the corner of Nelson and Richards, just on the edge of Yaletown, in Vancouver, British Columbia, Canada. In 2001, Martin Lewis, a UBC Professor and Noel Best Architect AIBC designed the facility the CAG now occupies. The exhibition facility consists of two galleries and a series of window vitrines on the façade that provide an additional opportunity for exhibition. The B.C. Binning Gallery is 1,040 square feet (97 m^{2}) and the Alvin Balkind Gallery is 676 square feet (62.8 m^{2}). A reception area adjoins the reading room, in which visitors can access information on current and past exhibitions. The Abraham Rogatnick Library, which participates in an international catalogue exchange with other galleries and museums, is located on the second floor and is open to the public by appointment. The building was awarded an AIBC Architectural Award of Excellence, Lieutenant Governor Medal in 2002. The Contemporary Art Gallery operates on the ancestral and unceded lands of the xʷməθkwəy̓əm (Musqueam), Sḵwx̱wú7mesh (Squamish) and səlilwətaɬ/Selilwitulh (Tsleil-Waututh) Nation.

== Programming ==
In 2018 the gallery began a five-year contract to curate art in the London Canada Gallery at the Canadian High Commission, London. In 2019 the gallery launched the How far do you travel? program, placing contemporary art on the side of Vancouver Translink buses.

== Notable publications ==
- Christopher Williams: Archäologie Beaux Arts Ethnography Théâtre-Vérité by Claudia Beck and John Miller. Contemporary Art Gallery, Vancouver, BC, 2005. (ISBN 0-920751-96-2)

== See also ==
- Canadian contemporary art
  - Vancouver School
- Centre A
- Morris and Helen Belkin Art Gallery
- Vancouver Art Gallery
- Western Front Society
