= Association des galeries d'art contemporain =

Association to promote culture in Quebec

The Association des galeries d'art contemporain (AGAC, English: Contemporary Art Galleries Association) is a non-profit organization created in 1985, whose head office is located in Montréal.

== Members ==
AGAC regroups galleries in Halifax, Montréal, Québec, Ottawa, Toronto, Edmonton, Calgary and Vancouver.

Members:

- Art Mûr (Montréal)
- Art45 (Montréal)
- Beaux-arts des Amériques (Montréal)
- Blouin Division (Montréal)
- Bradley Ertaskiran (Montréal)
- Christie Contemporary (Toronto)
- DURAN | MASHAAL (Montréal)
- ELLEPHANT (Montréal)
- Equinox Gallery (Vancouver)
- Feheley Fine Arts (Toronto)
- Galerie 3 (Québec)
- Galerie Bernard (Montréal)
- Galerie C.O.A. (Montréal)
- Galerie d'art Yves Laroche (Montréal)
- Galerie D'Este (Montréal)
- Galerie Éric Devlin (Montréal)
- Galerie Hugues Charbonneau (Montréal)
- Galerie Jean-Claude Bergeron (Ottawa)
- Galerie Michel Guimont (Québec)
- Galerie Robert Poulin (Montréal)
- Galerie Robertson Arès (Montréal)
- Galerie Simon Blais (Montréal)
- Galerie Youn (Montréal)
- Galerie.a (Québec)
- Galeries Roger Bellemare et Christian Lambert (Montréal)
- General Hardware Contemporary (Toronto)
- La Castiglione (Montréal)
- Lacerte art contemporain (Montréal)
- Laroche/Joncas (Montréal)
- McBride Contemporain (Montréal)
- Patel Brown (Toronto)
- Patrick Mikhail (Montréal)
- Paul Petro Contemporary Art (Toronto)
- Pierre-François Ouellette art contemporain (Montréal)
- Projet Pangée (Montréal)
- Stephen Bulger Gallery (Toronto)
- Studio 21 Fine Art (Halifax)
- TrépanierBaer Gallery (Calgary)
- VIVIANEART (Calgary)

== Awards ==
AGAC also presents the following awards in association with the Ville de Montréal: Prix Louis-Comtois and Prix Pierre-Ayot.

=== Prix Louis-Comtois ===
The Prix Louis-Comtois was created in 1991 to recognize excellence in visual arts and craft. The award, which is overseen jointly by AGAC and the Ville de Montréal, supports and promotes the work of an artist who has distinguished himself or herself in Montreal's contemporary art scene throughout the past 15 years.

Recipients of the Prix Louis-Comtois:

  - 2020: Chih-Chien Wang
  - 2019: Milutin Gubash
  - 2018: Cynthia Girard-Renard
  - 2017: Sophie Jodoin
  - 2016: Aude Moreau
  - 2015: Nicolas Baier
  - 2014: Patrick Bernatchez
  - 2013: Manon LaBrecque
  - 2012: Jean-Pierre Gauthier
  - 2011: Marie-Claude Bouthillier
  - 2010: Valérie Blass
  - 2009: Daniel Olson
  - 2008: Massimo Guerrera
  - 2007: François Morelli
  - 2006: Alexandre David
  - 2005: Claire Savoie
  - 2004: Stephen Schofield
  - 2003: Richard-Max Tremblay
  - 2002: Alain Paiement
  - 2001: Roberto Pellegrinuzzi
  - 2000: Guy Pellerin
  - 1999: Sylvie Laliberté
  - 1998: Rober Racine
  - 1997: Pierre Dorion
  - 1996: Marie-France Brière

=== Prix Pierre-Ayot ===
The Prix Pierre-Ayot was created in 1996 by the Ville de Montréal, in partnership with the Contemporary Art Galleries Association, to promote excellence among Montreal's new visual arts creators, to foster the dissemination of the work of young artists in the city's galleries and artist-run spaces, and to recognize the efforts of presenters to support up-and-coming artists. This award is intended for artists who are in the early stages of their career. It honours their exceptional workmanship and original contribu¬tion in painting, printing, drawing, illustration, photography or other mediums.

Recipients of the Prix Pierre-Ayot:

  - 2020: Caroline Monnet
  - 2019: Nadège Grebmeier-Forget
  - 2018: Adam Basanta
  - 2017: Celia Perrin Sidarous
  - 2016: Nicolas Grenier
  - 2015: Jon Rafman
  - 2014: Julie Favreau
  - 2013: Kim Waldron
  - 2012: Jacynthe Carrier
  - 2011: Olivia Boudreau
  - 2010: Alana Riley
  - 2009: Gwénaël Bélanger
  - 2008: Étienne Zack
  - 2007: Patrick Coutu
  - 2006: Raphaëlle de Groot
  - 2005: Emmanuelle Léonard
  - 2004: Jérôme Fortin
  - 2003: Pascal Grandmaison
  - 2002: Michel De Broin
  - 2001: Nathalie Grimard
  - 2000: Nicolas Baier
  - 1999: Emmanuel Galland
  - 1998: Marc Séguin
  - 1997: Stéphanie Béliveau
  - 1996: Nadine Norman
