= Adam Basanta =

Canadian artist (born 1985)

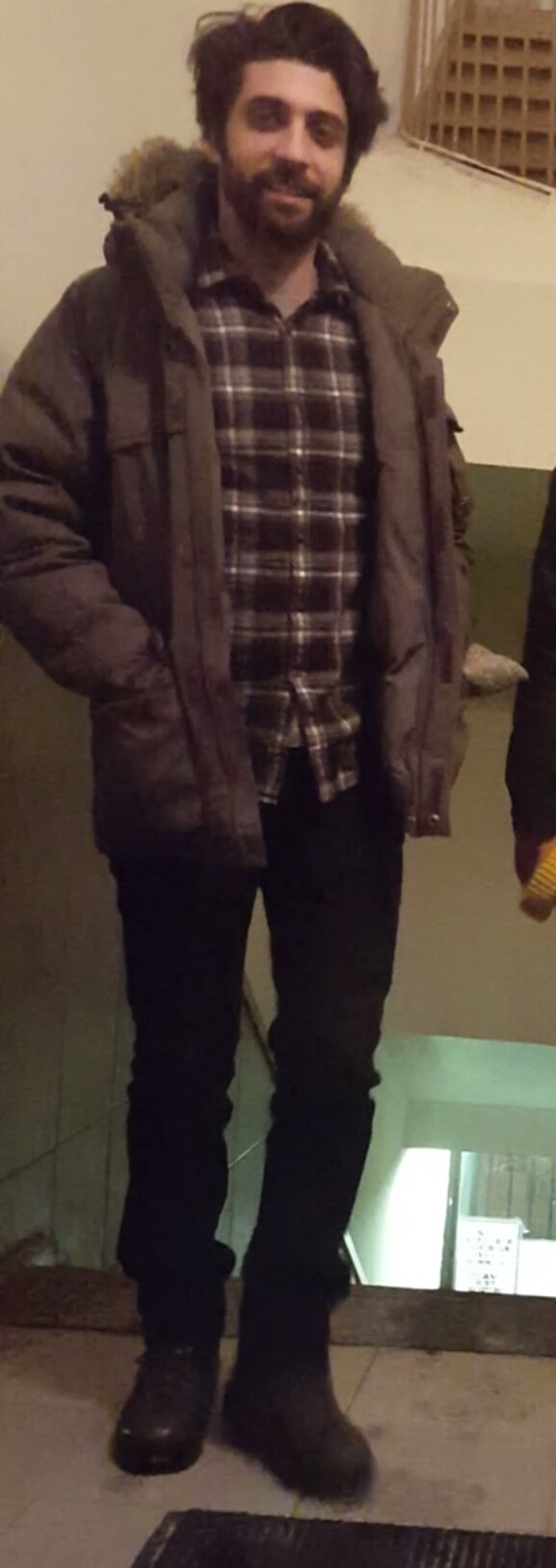
Adam Basanta

Adam Basanta (born 1985) is a Montreal-based artist and experimental composer whose practice investigates manifestations of technology as a meeting point of concurrent and overlapping systems. He uses various media (installation, kinetic sculpture, sound, computational image-making) and creates participatory and multi-sensory performances.

== Biography ==
Adam Basanta was born in Tel-Aviv in 1985. He was raised in Vancouver and lives and works in Montreal since 2010. He holds a BFA in music composition from Simon Fraser University (Vancouver) and an interdisciplinary Research-Creation Master in fine arts from Concordia University (Montreal).

Since 2015, his works have been exhibited in galleries and institutions internationally. He is represented by ELLEPHANT Gallery, Montreal, and his work can be found in the institutional collections of the Musée d’art contemporain de Montréal, the Musée national des beaux-arts du Québec, the Musée des beaux-arts de Montréal, and the Ville de Montréal, amongst others.

Remaining active as an experimental composer and performer, his concert music, live performances, and sound recordings are presented worldwide. His music has been released on Kohlenstoff Records (Canada), Farmacia901 (Italy), Important Records/Cassauna (USA), and Kasuga Records (Germany).

Adam Basanta is the recipient of numerous awards, including the Sobey Art Award in 2020, one of the most prestigious awards in Canadian art. In 2018, he received the Pierre-Ayot Prize for the best contemporary artist under 35 years of age working in Montreal.

== Work ==
Basanta is known for his sound sculptures and sound installation works. His artistic process is intuitive and relies on finding a poetic union between the technical and the conceptual. He focuses on the organisation of changeable choreographies using found technologies, including microphones, speakers, kinetic systems and customised software.

=== Art Survival Station (2020) ===
Artist Survival Station is a 60-day performance and a series of YouTube videos created in response to the financial, social, and emotional context of the COVID19 pandemic in 2020. It is a living sculpture that pays tribute to the process of DIY microgreens from building, seeding, harvesting, and even personal bicycle deliveries to members of Montreal's artistic community. This project, as a long-term performance, is an exercise of “re-commitment to sustainability in an era of late capitalism, knowledge gathering, and sharing in the atmosphere of online saturation, and to care and exchange with people in a moment where physical contact is not possible”. The system uses a capitalistic logic in terms of efficiency, growth, and sustainable production while letting go of profit and power.

=== Landscape Past Future (2019) ===
Landscape Past Future offers a new perspective to landscape paintings. Each artwork is created from the pixels of existing digitized landscape paintings or photographs sourced from the online permanent collections of major Museums. The collected pixels are then arranged as a mosaic by means of custom software and machine learning to recreate the aura of an artistic period. This process reveals “specific details of historically significant works as well overarching statistical features” in the new image. In an era of overflowing digital images, Landscape Past Future highlights the pressing digital preservation of a disappearing natural world. Basanta's impressions are summaries of artworks made into art.

=== All We’d Ever Need is One Another (Trio) (2018) ===
All We’d Ever Need is One Another (Trio) is a mixed-media installation composed of three flatbed scanners laid on their side and facing each other. The trio generates digital images independently of human input by scanning each other's surface. The ambient light and shadows produced by the environment or the audience impacts the scanning result. A software then randomizes contrasts, luminosity, saturation, and colors (cyan, magenta, and yellow).

Every newly generated image is studied by a series of deep-learning algorithms and compared to 1.5 million artworks issued from the database of Artsy, the Metropolitan Museum of Art, and the Museum of Modern Art of New York. When it matches an existing artwork beyond an 80% match, it is uploaded to a Twitter page and a dedicated website. This experimental photographic installation touches on issues of copyright because the protection is granted according to justifications that cannot be applied to machines or AI.

=== Curtain (White) (2016) ===
Curtain (White) is a sound installation made of 240 pairs of white earbud headphones arranged as a 3 meters high curtain or waterfall. Patterns of white noise move across the curtain evoking “organic memories of waves, wind, rain, and insects.” In this sound installation Basanta reorganises the ubiquitous earbuds, without altering their materiality, and creates a context where ready-made technologies allow the audience to retreat from the external world into a single sound instance of temporality.

== Career ==
=== Major solo exhibitions ===
2019

- The Unknown Future Rolls Towards Us. HBK Braunschweig, Braunschweig, Germany.
- All We’d Ever Need Is One Another (Trio). Arsenal Contemporary Art Toronto, Canada.
- Landscape Past Future. ELLEPHANT Gallery, Montreal, Quebec, Canada.
- Ballet Pathétique. Galerie Sans Nom. Moncton, New Brunswick, Canada.
- A Large Inscription, A Great Noise. Optica Centre d’Art Contemporain. Montreal, Quebec, Canada.

2018

- All we’d ever need is one another. ELLEPHANT Gallery, Montreal, Quebec, Canada.
- Variations on a Theme. Galerie Bon Accueil, Rennes, France.

2017

- Variations on a Theme. FOFA Gallery. Montreal, Quebec, Canada.
- Five Lines, Crossing. Galerija SC. Zagreb, Croatia.

2016

- A Room Listening to Itself. Gallery 1C03, Winnipeg, Manitoba, Canada.
- Inversion as literary device. Galeria Skolska28. Prague, Czech Republic.
- Principle of Distance. Museum of Transitory Art. Ljubljana, Slovenia.

2015

- The sound of empty space. Carroll/Fletcher Gallery. London, UK.
- Louder than a beating heart. Titanik Galerie. Turku, Finland.
- A room listening to itself. Centre for Contemporary Arts - Santa Fe, New Mexico, USA.
- The sound of empty space. Galerie B-312, Montreal, Quebec, Canada.

=== Significant group exhibitions ===
2021–2022

- Possible Futures. Maison des arts de Laval, Salle Alfred-Pellan. Laval, Quebec, Canada.
- A Truly Magical Moment. "Data Dating" curated by Valentina Peri. IMAL, Brussels, Belgium.

2021

- Écran Total. Centre de Design de l'UQAM, Montreal, Quebec, Canada.
- Artist Survival Station. Parallel Lines, Phi Centre, Montreal, Quebec, Canada.

2019

- Joueuses / Joueurs. Musée des beaux-arts de Montréal. Montreal, Quebec, Canada.
- Nemo Biennial. Cité Internationale des Arts, Paris, France.

2018

- Robot Love. Van Abbemuseum, Eindhoven.
- Post-Fail. Fotomuseum Winterthur, Switzerland.

=== Collections ===
- Collection of the Musée des beaux-arts de Montréal (MBAM), Quebec, Canada.
- Collection of the Musée d’art contemporain de Montréal, Quebec, Canada.
- Collection of the Musée national des beaux-arts du Québec (MNBAQ), Quebec, Canada.
- Collection Majudia, Montreal, Quebec, Canada.
- Collection of the Ville de Montréal, Quebec, Canada.
- Munich Re: Art Collection.
- Collection of the Museum of Transitory Art (MoTA), Ljublijana, Slovenia.

=== Awards ===
- Winner ex-aquo, Sobey Art Awards 2020 (Quebec region), Ottawa, Canada.
- Winner, Prix Pierre Ayot 2018. Ville de Montréal - Association des Galeries d’Art Contemporain, Montreal, Quebec, Canada.
- Longlisted (Quebec region), Sobey Art Awards 2018, Ottawa, Canada.
- Winner, Aesthetica Art Prize 2017, Aesthetica Magazine, York, UK.
- Excellence Prize, 19th Japan Media Arts Festival. Tokyo, Japan, 2016.
- Winner, Edith-Russ-Haus Awards for Emerging Media Artists 2014, Oldenburg, Germany.
- Finalist, Stephen and Claudine Bronfman Fellowship, Montreal, Quebec, Canada.
- Honourable Mention. Prix Ars Electronica 2013, Hybrid Art category.
