= Jodoin =

Jodoin is a surname. Notable people with the surname include:

- Amable Jodoin (1828–1880), Canadian businessman and politician
- Claude Jodoin (1913–1975), Canadian trade unionist and politician
- Clément Jodoin (born 1952), Canadian ice hockey player
- Florent Jodoin (1922–2008), Canadian cyclist
- France Jodoin (born 1961), Canadian artist
- Guy Jodoin (born 1966), Canadian comedian
- Jean-Baptiste Jodoin (1809–1884), Canadian politician
- Mariana Beauchamp Jodoin (1881–1980), Canadian politician
- René Jodoin (1920–2015), Canadian animator and film producer
- Sophie Jodoin (born 1965), Canadian artist
