= Centre A =

Public art gallery in Vancouver, British Columbia

Coordinates: 49°16′53″N 123°06′17″W

Centre A: Vancouver International Centre for Contemporary Asian Art
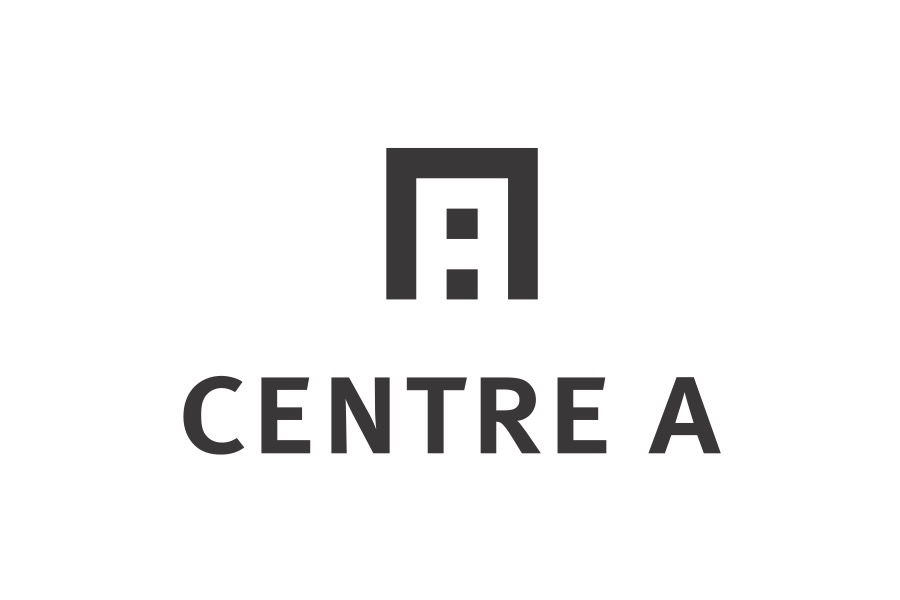
- Centre A's logo

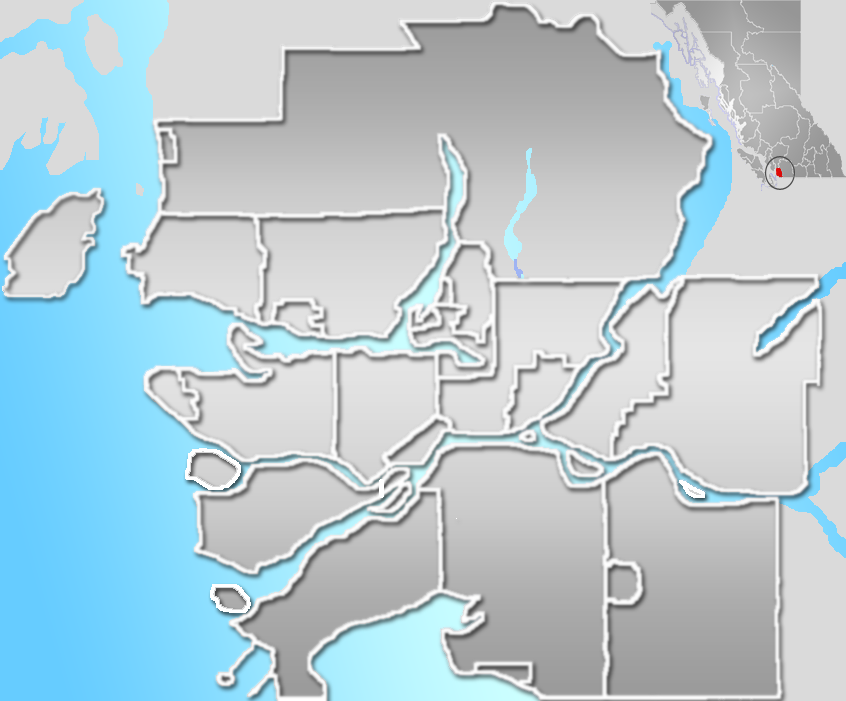
- Location within Vancouver
- Former name: Vancouver Centre for Contemporary Asian Art
- Established: February 23, 1999
- Location: 205-268 Keefer Street, Vancouver, British Columbia, Canada V6A 1X5
- Type: Public Art Gallery
- Website: www.centrea.org

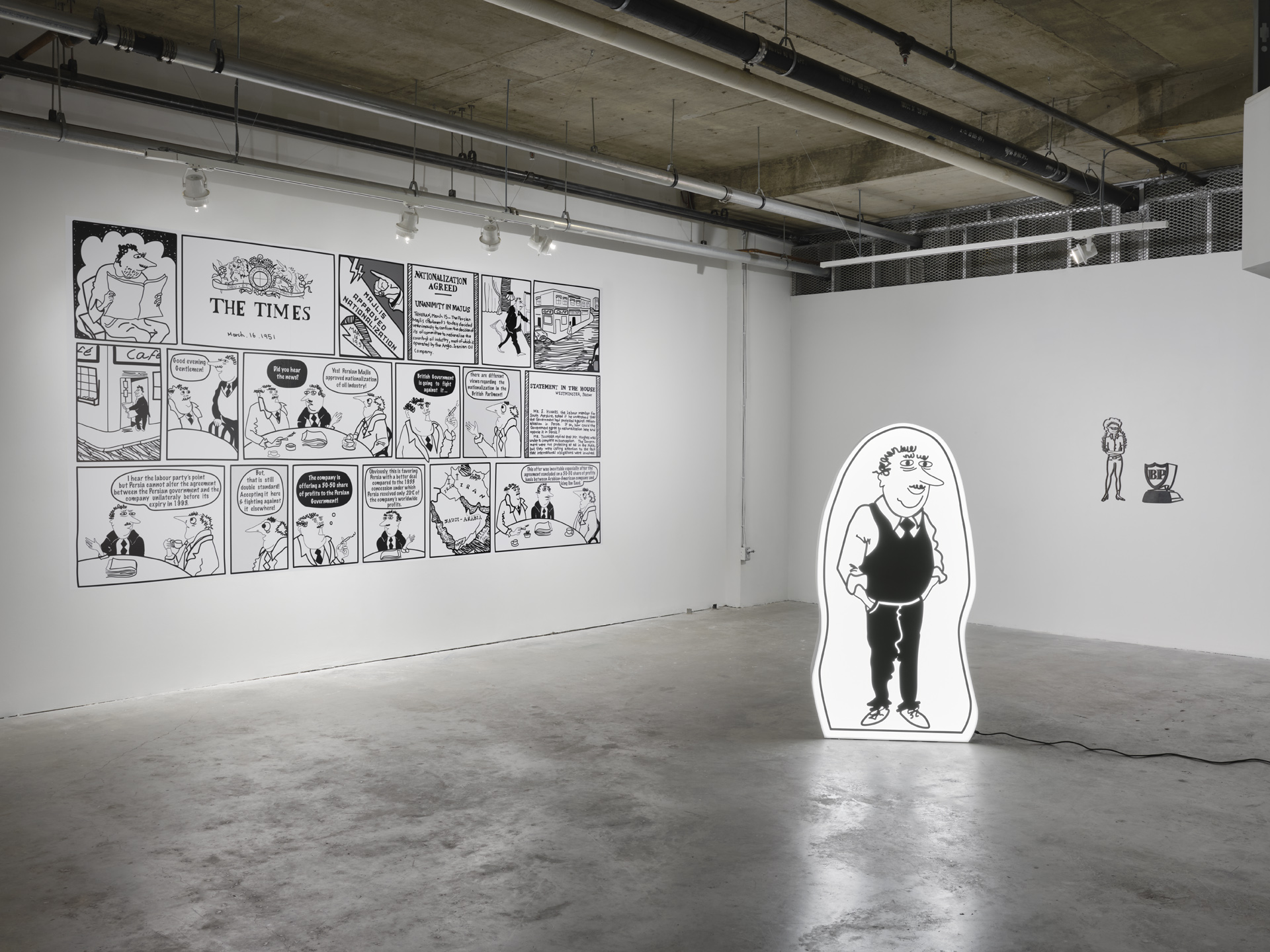
Sona Safaei-Sooreh, Revolving: a family tale, 2021, installation view at Centre A, Vancouver, curated by Henry Heng Lu. Photo by Rachel Topham Photography.

Centre A (Vancouver International Centre for Contemporary Asian Art) is a non-profit public art gallery in Vancouver committed to the research, production, presentation and interpretation of contemporary Asian art. It is the only public gallery in Canada dedicated to contemporary Asian and Asian Diasporic visual art practices. Founded in 1999 by Hank Bull (Founding Director), Zheng Shengtian and Stephanie Holmquist, the centre has been led by a board of directors with respected members of the community consisting Milton Wong, Joanne Louie Mah, Joe Wai and Anndraya Luui. Over the years, a number of curators and directors contributed to the success of the gallery, such as Sadira Rodrigues, Alice Ming Wai Jim, Makiko Hara, Haema Sivanesan, Tyler Russell, and Henry Heng Lu. Centre A is a registered charity.

Centre A was originally located at 849 Homer Street, near the Vancouver Public Library's central branch. It then moved to 2 West Hastings Street, in the Vancouver's Downtown Eastside. During this time Makiko Hara was Curator. In 2013, under the direction of Haema Sivanesan, Centre A relocated to Chinatown at 229 East Georgia Street. Over the years, the centre has exhibited a number of notable Canadian and international contemporary artists, such as Yoko Ono, Lida Abdul, Abbas Akhavan, Young-Hae Chang Heavy Industries, Hajira Waheed, Ali Kazimi, Lani Maestro, Kyohei Sakaguchi, Jim Wong-Chu, and Samson Young. Recently (2017-2018), Centre A moved to its current 3,300 square foot location at the Sun Wah Centre at 268 Keefer Street.

== Reading room and library ==
The Reading Room and Library at Centre A began in 1999 with contributions from artists, researchers, and curators both locally in Vancouver and internationally. Previous curators at Centre A "have made significant contributions in collecting publications that reflect and engage in conversations concerning contemporary Asian and Asian diasporic art practices, and the artistic relationships between North America and Asia." Centre A's Reading Room also houses the Fraser Finlayson Collection of rare books on Classical Chinese and Japanese Art with publications dating back to the late 19th century.
