= Labrecque =

Labrecque may refer to:

== People ==
- Albertine Morin-Labrecque (1866–1957), Canadian opera singer
- Jean-Claude Labrecque (1938–2019), Canadian director and cinematographer
- Manon Labrecque (1965–2023), Canadian artist
- Michel-Thomas Labrecque (1849–1932), Canadian Roman Catholic bishop
- Nil Labrecque (born 1965), Canadian luger
- Patrick Labrecque (born 1971), Canadian ice hockey player and coach
- Thomas G. Labrecque (1938–2000), American businessman

== Other ==
- 19379 Labrecque, minor planet
- Labrecque, Quebec, municipality in Canada
