= Sobey Art Award =

Canadian award

- Description: Canada's largest prize for young Canadian artists (aged 40 and under)
- Country: Canada
- Presented by: National Gallery of Canada & Sobey Art Foundation
- Website: http://www.sobeyartaward.ca/

The Sobey Art Award is Canada's largest prize for young Canadian artists. It is named after Canadian businessperson and art collector Frank H. Sobey, who established The Sobey Art Foundation. It is an annual prize given to an artist 40 and under who has exhibited in a public or commercial art gallery within 18 months of being nominated.

== Award structure and financial evolution ==
A jury consisting of an international juror and representatives of galleries from the West Coast and the Yukon, the Prairies and the North, Ontario, Quebec and the Atlantic Provinces creates a longlist of 25 artists, five from each region. The jury meets to select the winner and four other finalists, one from each region.

== Diversity, representation, and controversies ==
The Sobey award has attracted controversy in the past. Annie Pootoogook became the first Inuk artist to win the prize in 2006, despite the Sobey foundation failing to recognize her native Nunavut and the Northwest Territories as regions of significant cultural production. The award has 2017 was the first year to see the shortlist dominated by women and also the first year that more than one Indigenous artist was shortlisted.

Up to 2013, a total of $70,000 in prize money was awarded each time the prize was presented; $50,000 to the winner and $5,000 to the other four finalists. In 2014 the total was increased to $100,000 with $50,000 to the winner and $12,500 to the other four finalists. In 2017, the money awarded to longlisted artists was increased from $500 to $1,000. In 2018, the prize money increased once again, to a total of $240,000; $100,000 to the winner, $25,000 for each of the other four finalists, and $2,000 for each short-listed artist.

The award was presented biennially until 2006 at which point it became an annual award. From its inception until 2015, the Art Gallery of Nova Scotia organized and administered the Sobey Art Award and its accompanying exhibition. The National Gallery of Canada assumed responsibility for the award in 2016. In 2020, Sobey Art Foundation and the National Gallery of Canada decided to distribute the cash award among the 25 finalists rather than just one winner. This was a response to the financial hardships suffered by artists because of the COVID-19 pandemic.

== Winners ==
Year	Winner	Region
2002	Brian Jungen	West Coast and Yukon
2004	Jean-Pierre Gauthier	Quebec
2006	Annie Pootoogook	Prairies and the North
2007	Michel de Broin	Quebec
2008	Tim Lee	West Coast and Yukon
2009	David Altmejd	Quebec
2010	Daniel Barrow	Prairies and the North
2011	Daniel Young & Christian Giroux	Ontario
2012	Raphaëlle de Groot	Quebec
2013	Duane Linklater	Ontario
2014	Nadia Myre	Quebec
2015	Abbas Akhavan	Ontario
2016	Jeremy Shaw	West Coast and Yukon
2017	Ursula Johnson	Atlantic
2018	Kapwani Kiwanga	Ontario
2019	Stephanie Comilang	Ontario
2020	Michele Di Menna, Tsēmā Igharas, Carmen Papalia, Joseph Tisiga, Zadie Xa (West Coast and Yukon), Asinnajaq, Jason de Haan, Luther Konadu, Amy Malbeuf, Freya Björg Olafson (Prairies and the North), Bambitchell, Sara Cwynar, Georgia Dickie, Jagdeep Raina, Catherine Telford Keogh (Ontario), Adam Basanta, Moridja Kitenge Banza, Manuel Mathieu, Caroline Monnet, Sabrina Ratté (Quebec), Jordan Bennett, Melanie Colosimo, Graeme Patterson, Lou Sheppard, D’Arcy Wilson (Atlantic)	
2021	Laakkuluk Williamson Bathory	Prairies and the North
2022	Divya Mehra	Prairies and the North
2023	Kablusiak	Prairies and the North
2024	Nico Williams	Quebec
2025	Tania Willard	Pacific
2026	Lotus L. Kang	Ontario

== See also ==
- Sobey family
