= Makiko Hara (curator) =

Makiko Hara (born 1967) is an independent curator working in Tokyo, Japan and Vancouver, Canada.

== Career ==
Hara worked as an independent curator based in Tokyo and Montreal throughout the 1990s and early 2000s. During that time she was a co-founder of the collective Tokyo Art Speak, a collective that focused on art discourse. Since the late 90s Hara has curated numerous notable contemporary art exhibitions and projects throughout the Asia Pacific Rim. She moved to Vancouver in 2007 when she was appointed the Chief Curator of Centre A, International Centre for Contemporary Asian Art. She was Chief Curator at Centre A until 2013 during which time she curated exhibitions with major contemporary artists from Vancouver and across the world, including: Kyohei Sakaguchi, Shen Yuan, Cathy Busby and Garry Neill Kennedy, and Lani Maestro. In 2009 she was a guest curator at Scotia Bank Nuit Blanche, (Toronto, Canada), where she curated Zone C, in Liberty Village, on the theme of Urban Disaster/Catastrophe/Survival Actions, which included works by Tom Dean; Young-hae Chang Heavy Industries; Skeena Reece; Babak Golkar; Oswaldo Maciá; Brandon Vickerd; Jerome McGrath and Rina Grosman; Jason de Haan and Scott Rogers; Randy and Berenicci, and Kuo I-Chen.

In 2016, Hara was a contributing curator to MASH UP: The Birth of Modern Culture at the Vancouver Art Gallery, presenting a project by Japanese artist UJINO. IN 2018 she curatored Rock Paper Scissors, a project by Cindy Mochizuki, at Yonago City Museum, which later toured to Vancouver at the Nikkei Museum.
