= Cindy Mochizuki =

Japanese-Canadian artist (born 1976)

- Born: 1976 (age 48–49)
- Known for: Artist
- Website: https://www.cindymochizuki.com/

Cindy Mochizuki (born 1976) is a multimedia Japanese Canadian artist based in Vancouver, British Columbia. In her drawings, installations, performance, and video works created through community-engaged and location-specific research projects, Mochizuki explores how historical and family memories are passed down in the form of narratives, folktales, rituals and archives. Mochizuki's works have been exhibited in multiple countries including Japan, the United States, and Canada. Mochizuki received MFA in Interdisciplinary Studies from the School For Contemporary Arts at Simon Fraser University in 2006. She received Vancouver's Mayor's Arts Award in New Media and Film in 2015 and the VIVA and Max Wyman awards in 2020.

== Background ==
Mochizuki's paternal grandmother (a second-generation Japanese Canadian) and grandfather settled in the Fraser Valley in Langley as berry farmers in the early 1900s. They were uprooted during WWII and forced into Japanese Internment Camps in inner BC from 1942 to 1946. After the war, her family chose to be repatriated to Japan before they subsequently returned to Canada. This migration journey became a recurring theme in Mochizuki's artistic work.

== Selected projects ==
=== Hato-bue Choir ===
Hato-bue Choir (2023) was a community-engaged project led by Cindy Mochizuki and guest artists at Tonari Gumi. A series of 4 artist-led workshops on breath, wellness, drawing, ceramics and performance storytelling invited participants to create their own individual "hato-bue" flutes. The hato-bue flute is a traditional Japanese Mingei collectible object that was seen as a lucky talisman gifted to children for good health.

=== Autumn Strawberry ===
Autumn Strawberry (Summer 2019) was a research project conducted during Mochizuki's artist residency at Surrey Art Gallery. Many Japanese Canadians, including Mochizuki's paternal grandparents, worked in Fraser Valley on berry farms which were confiscated by the Canadian Government during the Second World War. The project resulted in a creation of a two-channel animated film, which was shown in 2021.

=== Shako Club ===
Shako Club (2015), or "social club," was a community-based project conducted during Mochizuki's two-month artist residency at grunt gallery, Vancouver. In collaboration with a Japanese Community Volunteer Association, Tonari Gumi, the project focused on community bonding through cooking and sharing knowledge and story; seniors made unique lunch boxes (bento) incorporating their personal stories and wellness philosophies. Members of the public could order those lunch boxes in exchange of gifts to seniors who made those "culinary sculptures."

=== Open Doors Project ===
Open Doors Project (2011) was a public art project that took place at the Powell Street Festival in 2011. Using the Japanese card game hanafuda as a visual inspiration, Mochizuki created sixteen panels as historic reference points of Japanese and Japanese Canadian people and their personal narratives. Each panel was placed each in front of a building, which used to host shops and institutions run by Japanese communities before WWII.

== Exhibitions ==
=== Selected solo exhibitions ===
- Tides & Moons: Herring Capital (2022), Nanaimo Art Gallery, Nanaimo, BC
- Autumn Strawberry (2021), Surrey Art Gallery, Surrey, BC
- The Sakaki Tree, A Jewel and The Mirror (2020) - Burrard Arts Foundation, Vancouver, BC
- Cindy Mochizuki: Cave to Dream (2019) - Richmond Art Gallery, Vancouver, BC
- Things on the Shoreline (2017) - Access Gallery, Vancouver, BC

=== Selected group exhibitions ===
- Hato-bue Choir (2023, Community-engaged project with guest artists) - Tonari Gumi: Japanese Community Volunteers Association, Vancouver, BC
- Stories that Animate Us (2021) - Vancouver Art Gallery, Vancouver, BC
- Where Do We Go From Here? (2021) - Vancouver Art Gallery, Vancouver, BC
- The Pandemic is a Portal (2020) - SFU Galleries, Vancouver, BC
- To talk to the worms and the stars (2017) - The New Gallery, Calgary, AB
- Absence in Remembrance: The Japanese Canadian Internment (2016) - Franc Gallery, Vancouver, BC curated by Kristine Olson
- YO-IN Reverberation (2012) - Nikkei National Museum, Burnaby, BC
- To | From BC Electric Railway 100 Years (2010) - Centre A Vancouver International Centre for Contemporary Asian Art curated by Makiko Hara and Annabel Vaughan

=== Other projects ===
- テンサイ (Tensai) by Cindy Mochizuki and Kelty Miyoshi McKinnon, Winnipeg Art Council

== Publications ==
=== K is for Kayashima: Rock, Paper, Scissors ===
This book was created after her research in Yonago, Tottori Prefecture in Japan, where approximately 1,500 people migrated to British Columbia, Canada between 1895 and the onset of the Pacific War. The book contains an essay by a curator, Makiko Hara.

=== Illustrations ===
Mochizuki's illustrations appear in West Coast Line, Front magazine, Alternatives Journal, and other illustrated books, such as Perpetual by Rita Wong and Things on the Shoreline.
