= Alice Ming Wai Jim =

Canadian art historian and curator

- Education: MA, Concordia University (1996), PhD, Dean's Honour Roll, SSHRC and FCAR doctoral fellow, McGill University (2004),
- Known for: Educator, Independent Curator, Writer, Researcher
- Awards: Artexte Prize for Research in Contemporary Art

Alice Ming Wai Jim is an art historian, curator and professor at Concordia University in Montreal, Quebec, Canada, as well as an adjunct professor in Graduate Studies at OCAD University in Toronto, Ontario, Canada. She focuses her research on diasporic art in Canada, contemporary Asian art and contemporary Asian Canadian art, particularly on the relationships between remix culture and place identity. She currently holds the Concordia University Research Chair in Ethnocultural Art History (2017–2022).

Jim was the Research Fellow at the Centre of Asian Studies and the Centre for the Study of Globalization and Cultures at the University of Hong Kong. She was also the curator at Centre A: Vancouver International Centre for Contemporary Asian in Vancouver, British Columbia, Canada, from 2003 until 2006.

Jim is the founding co-editor of the Journal of Asian Diasporic Visual Cultures and the Americas (ADVA) with Alexandra Chang published by Brill (Leiden, NL) in association withGail and Stephen A. Jarislowsky Institute for Studies in Canadian Art (Concordia University) and the Asian/Pacific/American Institute (New York University). She is a board member of CAA (The College Art Association).

== Exhibitions and symposiums ==
In 2014, Jim participated as a co-organizer for "Performing Asian/Americas: Converging Movements," for the ninth Encuentro of The Hemispheric Institute of Performance and Politics, Montreal, and as a co-director of the workshop "Contemporary Art and the Inter-Asian Imaginary" for Inter-Asian Connections IV, Istanbul. In 2013 she curated "Yam Lau: A World is a Model of the World" at the Darling Foundry, Montreal. In 2019, Jim as a visiting professor for Summer Institute 2019: Future Commons at Tai Kwun Contemporary in Hong Kong as well as a co-chair for the Artistic Committee (Exhibition) for ISEA2020 Montreal: Why Sentience? (International Symposium on Electronic Art).

== Publications ==
The scope of her published writing work also have taken the form of essays, exhibition catalogues and anthologies. Other texts include "The Maraya Project: Research-Creation, Inter-reference and the Worlding of Asian Cities" in the journal Third Text, Volume 28, 2014, "RoCH Redux" in Yishu, Journal of Contemporary Chinese Art, "Mediating Place-Identity: Notes on Mathias Woo's A Very Good City" in Precarious Visualities: New Perspectives on Identification in Contemporary Art and Visual Culture, 2008, "Let Your Fingers Do the Walking: Rereading Ho Tam's The Yellow Pages' in Reel Asian: Asian Canada on Screen, and "Articulating Spaces of Representation, Contemporary Black Women Artists in Canada" in Racism, Eh? A Critical Inter-Disciplinary Anthology of Race and Racism in Canada, 2004

== Research Interests ==
As an art historian and curator, Jim's work has helped to amplify new discourses throughout the fields of ethnocultural and global art histories, critical race theory, media arts, and curatorial studies. With a focus in primarily contemporary Asian Canadian and Black Canadian artists, Jim has curated exhibitions with over fifty artists, and has also been involved in organizing a number of scholarly events and arts community organizing on these topics.

== Selected curated exhibitions ==
- "All Aboard the Redress Express." Alice Ming Wai Jim. Catalogue accompanying Redress Express: Chinese Restaurants and the Head Tax Issue in Contemporary Art exhibition. Vancouver: Vancouver Centre for Contemporary Asian Art (Centre A), 2007. 1-5

== Exhibition catalogues ==
- Primary essay contributor. “When Worlds Meet: Howie Tsui’s Retainers of Anarchy.” Howie Tsui. Vancouver: Vancouver Art Gallery; Victoria, BC: Art Gallery of Greater Victoria, 2017. 10–31.
- Curatorial essay contributor. “Yam Lau (Toronto): A World is a Model of a World.” Montreal: Darling Foundry, 2013. French trans.
- “Faciality, Trauma and Ambivalence in Performance Art: Insoon Ha’s Monology.” Reprint. Ed. Sally Frater. Hamilton, ON: The Print Studio, 2013.
- “Introduction.” 14 Asias: Perspectives on Contemporary Art. Ed. Alice Ming Wai Jim, Taralyn Boyden, Jessica Carroll, Katerina Lagassé, and Charles P.T. Leonard with contributing editors Anaïs McNicoll-Castro Lopes, Alannah Clamp, Béatrice Cloutier-Trépanier, Andromachi Gagas, Charlotte Jacob-Maguire, Allison Smith and Eliana Stratica Mihail / with essays by Taralyn Boyden, Anaïs Castro, Alannah Clamp, Béatrice Cloutier-Trépanier, Madeline Coleman, Andromachi Gagas, Charlotte Jacob-Maguire, Katerina Lagassé, Charles P.T. Leonard, Allison Smith and Eliana Stratica Mihail. Montreal: Department of Art History, Concordia University, 2011. 9-11.
- "Rearranging Desires: Curating the 'Other' Within." Rearranging Desires. Montreal: The Gail and Stephen A. Jarislowsky Institute for Studies in Canadian Art; Faculty of Fine Arts Gallery, 2008. 1-8. Editor and essay contributor.
- "All Aboard the Redress Express." Redress Express. Ed. Alice Ming Wai Jim. Catalogue accompanying Redress Express: Chinese Restaurants and the Head Tax Issue in Contemporary Art exhibition. Vancouver: Vancouver Centre for Contemporary Asian Art (Centre A), 2007. 1-5.
- "Playing Devil's Advocate." Amy Cheung: Devil's Advocate. Nürnberg: Verlag für moderne Kunst Nürnberg, 2007. 8-13. Editor and essay contributor (artist book). Excerpts published simultaneously as: (1) "Amy Cheung: Playing Devil's Advocate." Star Fairy: Hong Kong in Venice. Ed. Norman J. Ford. Hong Kong Arts Development Council; 52nd Venice Biennale, 2007. 19-34. English & trans. Chinese and Italian. (2) "Amy Cheung: Sirens for Hong Kong." Reversing Horizons: Artist Reflections of the Hong Kong Handover 10th Anniversary. Shanghai: Shanghai Museum of Contemporary Art, 2007. English & trans. Chinese.
- "Shifting Space." Gu Xiong, Ben Reeves and Patrick Mahon: Shifting Space. Chongqing: Museum of Sichuan Fine Arts Institute, 2005. 6pp, English & trans. Chinese.
- "Ramona Ramlochand: White Desert." Le Mois de la photo 2005. Ed. Martha Langford. Montreal: McGill-Queen's University Press, 2005. 53-56.
- "Neighbourhood." Neighbourhood. Ed. Alice Ming Wai Jim and Portia Priegert. Vancouver: Vancouver International Centre for Contemporary Asian Art, 2005.
- "Afterword: Kim Huynh, Inflected Signs." Charlie Don't Surf: 4 Vietnamese American Artists. Ed. Alice Ming Wai Jim and Viet Le. Vancouver: Vancouver International Centre for Contemporary Asian Art, 2005. 43-47.
- Editor and essay contributor. "A Discourse of Fear." Samina Mansuri: DARR: 37 Conversations.Vancouver: Vancouver International Centre for Contemporary Asian Art, 2004. 2-4. Essay published online as part of The New Republics Digital Archive (2008).
- Para/Site: Open Work. Ed. David Ho Yeung Chan and Alice Ming Wai Jim. Hong Kong: Para/Site Art Space; Vancouver: Vancouver International Centre for Contemporary Asian Art, 2004.Para/Site: Open Work
- "Chez Soi." Mei-Kuei Feu: Zone flottante. Ed. Alice Ming Wai Jim. Vancouver: Vancouver International Centre for Contemporary Asian Art, 2004. 4-6.
- "Informal Residency" and "In Conversation with Gailan Ngan." Gailan Ngan: Informal Residency. Ed. Alice Ming Wai Jim. Vancouver: Vancouver International Centre for Contemporary Asian Art, 2004.
- "A 'Walking Knowledge' of the City and Other Considerations: Works by Sara Wong." Moving Violations: An Exhibition of the Urban and the Image. Ed. Pamela Kember. Hong Kong: Art Asia Archive, 2002. 12-14, 15-17, English & trans. Chinese.
- "Recycling Cinema and other works by Ellen Pau." Venice Hong Kong: Magic at Street Level. Ed. Johnson Chang. Hong Kong: Hong Kong Arts Development Council; 49th Venice Biennale, 2001. 42-51. English & trans. Chinese and Italian.
- "Dialogue and Difference." Traversals. Ed. Norman Jackson Ford and Alice Ming Wai Jim. Hong Kong: Map Book Publishers, 2001. 15-22.
- Cornell, Lauren; Halter, Ed (2015). Mass effect: art and the internet in the twenty-first century. MIT Press. ISBN 978-0-262-33069-5.
- Ford, Norman Jackson; Jim, Alice Ming Wai; Pamminger, Klaus; Gamauf, Susanne (2001). Traversals. Hong Kong: MapBook Publishers. ISBN 978-962-86040-2-9.
- Henders, Susan J; Cho, Lily; Jim, Alice Ming Wai (2014). Human rights and the arts: perspectives on global Asia. Lexington Books. ISBN 978-0-7391-8473-8.
- Jessup, Lynda; Robertson, Kirsty; Morton, Erin (2014). Negotiations in a vacant lot: studying the visual in Canada. McGill-Queen's University Press. ISBN 978-0-7735-9637-5.
- Jim, Alice Ming Wai (1996). Transculturalism in Asian Diasporic Art. Oxford: Oxford University Press.
- Jim, Alice Ming Wai; Mahan, Patrick; Reeves, Ben; Gu Xiong; Museum of Sichuan Fine Arts Institute (2005). Shifting space: Patrick Mahan, Ben Reeves, Gu Xiong. Museum of Sichuan Fine Arts Institute.
- Jim, Alice Ming Wai (1996). "An Analysis and Documentation of the 1989 Exhibition "Black Wimmin: When and Where We Enter"". RACAR: Revue d'art canadienne / Canadian Art Review. 23 (1/2): 71–83. ISSN 0315-9906. JSTOR 42630552.
- Le, Viet; Ming Wai Jim, Alice; Thinh Võ, Linda (2005). Charlie don't surf!: 4 Vietnamese American artists. Vancouver: Centre A. ISBN 978-0-9732711-1-9.

== Awards ==
Jim was awarded the Distinguished Teaching Award from the Faculty of Fine Arts through the nominations of Concordia's Graduate and Undergraduate students in the category of Emerging Teacher and the Christopher Jackson Teaching Award from the Department of Art History in 2016. She was also awarded the Artexte Prize for Research in Contemporary Art, the second recipient of the prize since its inception in 2012. In November 2019, Jim will be elected to the Royal Society of Canada's College of New Scholars for her contributions in the field of arts and humanities.
