= Kevin Sonmor =

Canadian artist

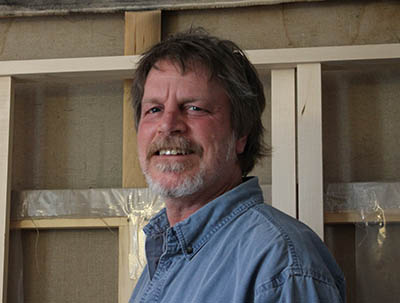
- Born: Lacombe, Alberta, Canada
- Known for: Painter
- Movement: Postmodernism
- Website: Artist website

Kevin Sonmor (1959) is a Canadian artist known for paintings of still lifes, equine and marine scenes. A postmodernist, Sonmor blurs the boundaries between contemporary abstract landscape and historic landscape traditions by creating a visual language which is both representational and symbolic. His work is exhibited in public and private galleries across North America and in Europe.

Sonmor’s paintings are described by curator Sarah Boucher of the Musée des beaux-arts de Sherbrooke as "classical subjects – flowers, fruits, still lives, horses – with a more contemporary technique, a spontaneous brush stroke, a texture modern and fluid, with powerful coloration." Painted in oils on linen, canvas or panel, his iconography frequently references legend or myth. Sonmor's atmospheric landscapes evoke the 19th-Century European Romanticism of J. M. W. Turner or Caspar David Friedrich. His strong use of chiaroscuro recalls Rembrandt or Caravaggio, while his still lifes recall the vanitas imagery of Dutch painter Jan Steen.

== Career ==
Born in 1959 in Lacombe, Alberta, Sonmor studied art from 1983 to 1988 at the Alberta College of Art and Design in Calgary and at the Banff Centre for the Arts' summer studio program in 1986. His first solo exhibition was held at Truck Contemporary Art Gallery (Calgary) in 1988, and later that year he moved to Montreal, Quebec, to attend Concordia University. During 1990-1, solo exhibitions of his work were held at Modern Fuel Artist-Run Centre (Kingston ON) and Centre des arts actuels Skol (Montreal). After graduating from Concordia with a Masters of Fine Art in 1991, Sonmor remained in Quebec. In 1993 he exhibited at the parallel galleries, Language Plus (Alma QC), and at the Niagara Artists Centre (St Catharines ON).

In 1998 the University of Waterloo organized an exhibition of Sonmor's work which toured the Art Gallery of Sudbury, and the Art Gallery of Algoma (Sault Ste Marie ON). In 2002, Sonmor participated with artists Peter Krausz and Tom Hopkins in the group show Made In Canada: Contemporary Art from Montreal at the Plattsburgh State Art Museum (Plattsburgh NY). A retrospective of his work, on display at the Mendel Art Gallery (Saskatoon SK), the Art Gallery of Southwestern Manitoba (Brandon MB) and the Robert McLaughlin Gallery (Oshawa ON) in 2002-3 and a solo exhibition at the Art Gallery of Mississauga in 2004 established his reputation across Canada In 2010 he exhibited with James Lahey and Ed Bartram at the Macdonald Stewart Art Centre (Guelph ON). In 2012 an exhibition with painter France Jodoin at the Musée des beaux-arts de Sherbrooke (Sherbrooke Museum of Fine Arts) drew positive media reviews. In 2014 a solo exhibition of his work was held at the Art Gallery of Grande Prairie (Grande Prairie AB). Throughout his career, solo exhibitions of his work were also held in private galleries across North America including Galerie de Bellefeuille (Montreal QC), James Baird Gallery (St John’s NL), Leo Kamen Gallery (Toronto), Katzman Contemporary (Toronto), Newzones Gallery of Contemporary Art (Calgary AB), The Lowe Gallery (Los Angeles CA), and Addington Gallery (Chicago IL). Sonmor's work was featured at Couture Galleri (Stockholm, Sweden) in 2013, and his participation in the 2014 exhibition Blue received international attention.

Sonmor has a studio in Dunham, Quebec, and lives in nearby Cowansville with his wife, painter France Jodoin.

== Contribution ==
Art critic Florentina Lungu credits Sonmor for creating a new pictorial language which is both representational and symbolic. Describing his style as "postmodern with neo-romantic accents" in the journal Vie des Arts, Lungu identified in Sonmor's work the influence of mid 20th-century abstract art, expressionism, pop art, and American conceptual artists Clyfford Still and Barnett Newman, as well as the still lifes of Velasquez, Caravaggio, and the 17th-century Dutch painters. Describing Sonmor as "an aesthetician's painter", Mark Daniel Cohen wrote, "What matters about them is not their art historical references but their tonality, their emotional aura, the atmospheric quality they emit." For curator David Liss, "Kevin Sonmor's paintings are charged with unsettling tensions between ambiguity and meaning, historic traditions and the contemporary condition, between nature and culture, tragedy and possibility, process and finished product." In Vie des Arts, reviewer Anne Severson also noted that these "apparent contradictions suggest a mysterious, otherworldly character of spiritually".

Sonmor's work is found in the public collections of the Canada Council for the Arts Art Bank (Ottawa ON), Department of External Affairs, Government of Canada (Ottawa ON), Art Gallery of Nova Scotia (Halifax NS), Musée des beaux-arts de Sherbrooke, Art Gallery of Algoma, Sault Ste. Marie ON), Macdonald Stewart Art Centre (Guelph ON), Simon Fraser University (Vancouver BC), Brock University (St. Catherines ON), University of Waterloo (Waterloo ON), and White Mountain Academy of the Arts (Elliot Lake ON). His work is also found in many corporate collections including The Bronfman Collection: Claridge Inc (Montreal QC), Canderel Management (Montreal QC), Banque Nationale (Montreal QC), Cirque du Soleil (Montreal QC), the Royal Bank of Canada (Toronto ON), Canadian Imperial Bank of Commerce (Toronto ON), Toronto Dominion Bank (Toronto ON), SunLife Insurance (Toronto ON), Canada Life Insurance (Toronto ON), Hewlett-Packard (Toronto ON) and Tristone Capital (Calgary AB).

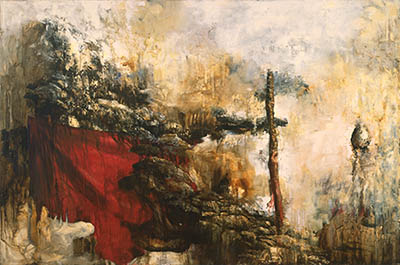
Art Gallery of Nova Scotia

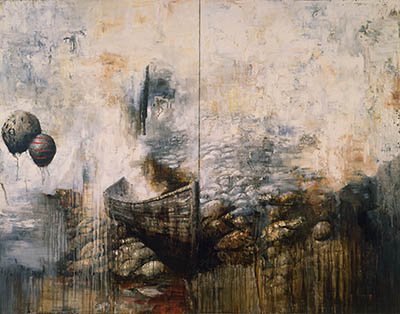
Art Gallery of Algoma
