= Young & Giroux =

Young & Giroux was an artistic collaboration between the Canadian artists Daniel Young (Toronto, Ontario, 1981) and Christian Giroux (Kingston, Ontario, 1971). They actively collaborated from 2002 - 2020. Young is based between Toronto, Ontario and Berlin, Germany and Giroux lives in Guelph, Ontario, where he teaches in the School of Fine Art and Music of Guelph University. Daniel Young has a degree in Interdisciplinary Geography from the University of Toronto; Christian Giroux is a graduate of the University of Victoria and NSCAD University. In Victoria, Giroux studied with the artists, Mowry Baden and Robert Youds. Young and Giroux were the winners of Canada's Sobey Art Award in 2011. Daniel Young was the Canada Council Artist in Residence at the Künstlerhaus Bethanien in Berlin for 2011–12.

== Art practice ==
Young and Giroux began making art together in 2002. Their practice combines sculptural works, film, and public art. In the artists' own words, they describe their art practice as "the product of an ongoing conversation concerning the modernity of the mid-century, the production of space and the built environment." As critic John Bentley Mays notes, the modernity that interests Young and Giroux is "popular and mass cultural, a phenomenon in which the most prized characteristic is mechanical functionality, not (as in the fine arts) clever or beautiful appearances." Manufactured components found in the contemporary world often comprise the material for Young and Giroux's art. For instance, an early sculpture by the duo called Access (2004) is made with galvanized steel ductwork, while Excel (2004) is composed of steel strut and fluorescent light fixtures. Later works like Andersson (2010) or The Terrorizers (2010) combine powder coated aluminum with milled IKEA furniture to create hybrid structures. While these sculptures' make reference to the way IKEA products embody "a convergence of modernist ideals and late capitalism," the artists also make clear that they take an interest in the manufactured world as a palette for the making of abstract works, consistent with the traditions of the plastic arts. Young and Giroux's film work focuses on the built environment. Every Building, or Site, that a Building Permit Has Been Issued for a New Building in Toronto in 2006 (2008) is a sequence of 8 – 10 second long static shots of 130 Toronto addresses, all of which meet the criteria of the title. In some ways, an informal sociological study, "constructed in nearly equal units" the film "is also a sculpture," as critic Peggy Gale points out. Young and Giroux's Infrastructure Canada (2010–12) takes a similar approach, filming large-scale public works—such as dams and bridges - at a range of locations across Canada. The result is a portrait of the "material basis of the very idea of Canada". Young and Giroux have done a number of public art projects. Reticulated Gambol (2007–2008), located at the Lee Centre Park in Toronto, Ontario, creates a functioning jungle gym that reflects on the conventions of this typical urban form. Nearly 12 meters square in size, the work combines a series of cupolas with bridges to create a large unified structure that, in width and height, sits at the limits of what is possible within the city building codes regulating the climbing gym format.

== Selected publications ==
- a-book-that-is-a-website-for-a-film-that-is-a-sculpture.cgdy.com, 2019, ISBN 978-3-943196-76-4
- Berlin 2013/1983, 2017, ISBN 978-3-93 1435-42-4
- Young & Giroux: Films 2008–2012, The Rooms, 2016, ISBN 978-1-928156-04-8
- Infrastructure Canada, Oakville Galleries, 2016, ISBN 978-1-894707-38-1
- Y & G #12 (curtain walls), Carleton University Art Gallery, 2014 ISBN 978-0770905750
- The Mass Production of Artwork, 2014, Künstlerhaus Bethanien, 2012, ISBN 978-3-941230-15-6
- Young & Giroux, Southern Alberta Art Gallery, 2011, ISBN 978-1-894699-51-8

== Selected exhibitions ==
- Film Path / Camera Path, with under-titles, Art Gallery of Greater Victoria, Victoria (2019)
- Film Path / Camera Path, with under-titles, Inter-Access, Toronto (2019)
- Young & Giroux, 8 - 11 Gallery, Toronto (2017)
- Berlin 2013 - 1983, Deutsches Architektur Zentrum, Berlin (2016)
- Berlin 2013 - 1983, Art Gallery of Guelph / Ed Video, Guelph (2016)
- Berlin 2013 - 1983, Toronto International Film Festival Bell Lightbox / Goethe-Institut (2015)
- Young & Giroux, The Rooms, St. John's (2015)
- Y & G #12 (curtain walls), Carleton University Art Gallery (2013)
- Young & Giroux, Musée d'art Contemporain de Montréal (2011)
- Young & Giroux, Southern Alberta Art Gallery, Lethbridge (2010)
- 50 Light Fixtures from Home Depot, Mercer Union, Toronto (2010)
- Akademie der Kunst for the Forum Expanded, Berlinale, Berlin (2010)
- EXiS festival Seoul, South Korea (2009)

== Selected public commissions ==
- Three Points Where Two Lines Meet, City of Toronto (2018)
- Lambent, Square One Shopping Centre, Mississauga (2015)
- Nyctophilia, Mt. Dennis Public Art Project, City of Toronto (2014)
- Interregnum: Corner Displacement for John Andrews, University of Toronto Scarborough (2011)
- Camera Tracking a Spiral..., Nuit Blanche, Toronto (2010)
- Reticulated Gambol, Lee Centre Park, City of Toronto (2008)
