= Divya Mehra =

Canadian artist

- Born: 1981 (age 44–45); Winnipeg, Manitoba, Canada
- Education: Columbia University, University of Manitoba
- Known for: Multimedia artist
- Website: divyamehra.com

Divya Mehra (born 1981) is a Canadian artist from Winnipeg, Manitoba. Mehra was awarded the 2019 Wanda Koop Research Fund. She received the Sobey Art Award, presented annually by the National Gallery of Canada, in 2022.

== Early life and education ==
Mehra was born Winnipeg, Canada, the second youngest of four children. She received her BFA (Honours) in Visual Arts from the University of Manitoba School of Art in Winnipeg in 2005 and her MFA in Visual Arts from Columbia University School of the Arts in New York City in 2008.

== Work ==
Divya Mehra, Dangerous Women (Blaze of Glory), 2017, digital image. This work is the inaugural Art+Feminism Call to Action Art Commission.

Mehra works in a multitude of forms, including sculpture, print, drawing, artist books, installation, advertising, performance, video and film. She often uses humour as an entry to her work. By pairing research and popular culture — including comics and social media — with her experience as an artist within the Indian diaspora, she creates works meant to be provocative yet humorous.

== Selected projects ==
Mehra is known in part for her text-based works. One of her first of such works, Currently Fashionable, was created in 2009 and shown as a part of her exhibition, You have to tell them, I'm not a Racist first presented in 2012 at La Maison des artistes visuels francophones, in St. Boniface, Manitoba, and again in 2017 at Georgia Scherman Projects in Toronto. The text works appear in English, Hindi and French.

In 2012, Mehra was one of ten artists commissioned by MTV, MoMA PS1, and Creative Time to reimagine Art Breaks — a video series on MTV in the 1980s that first showcased video work by Keith Haring, Jean-Michel Basquiat and Andy Warhol. Art Breaks 2012 featured videos by Sema Bekirovic, Cody Critcheloe, Andrew Kuo, Mads Lynnerup, Tala Madani, Mehra, Rashaad Newsome, Jani Ruscica, Mickalene Thomas, and Guido van der Werve.

In 2018, Mehra was commissioned to create the Spring 2018 Canadian Art Magazine cover for the Dirty Words issue. For the cover image she recreated the set of the popular Canadian sketch comedy show, You Can't Do That On Television, and reimagined one of the infamous recurring moments when a character on set is being drenched with slime whenever they say I don't know. That same issue also features an artist folio by her — entitled Tone — that explores the complexity of South Asian diasporic experiences.

Mehra was the subject of a 2018 episode of the CBC Arts docuseries, In The Making. The series, hosted by Sean O’Neill, follows leading Canadian artists around the world as they bring their work to life. In the series finale, Mehra travels to India to begin work on a new inflatable work — a bouncy castle Taj Mahal — that was then exhibited for the first time as a special project for Vision Exchange: Perspectives From India to Canada, which began its cross-Canada tour in September 2018. The National Gallery of Canada acquired the work.

In 2023, Mehra was commissioned to create two new inflatable works for Nuit Blanche Toronto.

== Selected exhibitions ==
- Banff Centre
- Art Gallery of Ontario
- Morris and Helen Belkin Art Gallery at the University of British Columbia
- Artspeak

== Selected awards ==
- Manitoba Arts Council, Major Arts Grant, 2014
- Glenfiddich Art Award, shortlist, 2015
- Sobey Art Award, shortlist, Prairies and the North region, 2017
- Wanda Koop Research Fund, 2020
- Sobey Art Award, winner, 2022.

== Publications ==
- Mehra. '"Tone". Canadian Art Magazine, 2018.
- Mehra. Pouring Water on a Drowning Man. Winnipeg: As We Try and Sleep Press, 2014.
- Mehra. Quit, India. Vancouver: Artspeak & Winnipeg: Platform Gallery, 2013.

== Selected reviews and interviews ==
- Jen Zoratti. "Artist tackles colonialism with wit, Inflatable installation acquired by National Gallery of Canada," Winnipeg Free Press, August 31, 2019.
- Yaniya Lee. "Tactics and Strategies of Racialized Artists: Some Notes on How to Circumvent the Art World's Terms of Inclusion," ArtsEverywhere/Musagetes, November 29, 2018.
- Marissa Largo. "Jamelie Hassan and Divya Mehra: Cultural Currency and Canada 150," Asian Diasporic Visual Cultures and the Americas, Issue 4, March 4, 2018.
- Mark Mann. "White Like Me: Encountering Divya Mehra's You have to tell Them, i'm not a Racist.," Momus, October 21, 2017.
- Amy Fung. "Dearest Divya," in conjunction with the exhibition You have to tell Them, i'm not a Racist., Georgia Scherman Projects, Toronto, 2017.
- Kendra Place. "Abolish, She Said," in conjunction with the exhibition You have to tell Them, i'm not a Racist., Georgia Scherman Projects, Toronto, 2017.
- Angela Henderson & Solomon Nagler. "Review: It's Gonna Rain," Border Crossings Magazine, Issue 141, March 2017.
- Denise Markonish. “Oh, Canada: Contemporary Art from North North America,” in conjunction with the exhibition, Oh, Canada, at MASS MoCA, Cambridge, MA: MIT Press, 2012.
