= Nico Williams (artist) =

- Born: 1989 (age 36–37)

Nico Williams (born 1989) is a contemporary Aamjiwnaang (Anishinaabe) First Nation Canadian artist based in (Tiohtià:ke) Montréal, Quebec.

He completed his MFA at Concordia University in 2021. His practice divulges in storytelling and utilizes beadwork to create the sculptural art object that conceptualizes and depicts visual narratives. Williams plays an active role in the contemporary creative arts society in Montreal and is a leading political activist within the Indigenous Montreal Arts Community.

In 2021, Williams contributed to Sick Kids Hospital in Toronto through his work, Monument to the Brave, which consisted of 250 000 beads matched by an additional 3000 beads donated by SickKids’ Bravery Beads Program spearheaded by the Women's Auxiliary Volunteers group.

== Awards and recognition ==
In 2021 he was awarded with the Claudine and Stephen Bronfman Fellowship in Contemporary Art and most recently won the 2024 Sobey Art Award.
