= Salvador Allende Monument (Montreal) =

Outdoor sculpture in Montreal, Canada

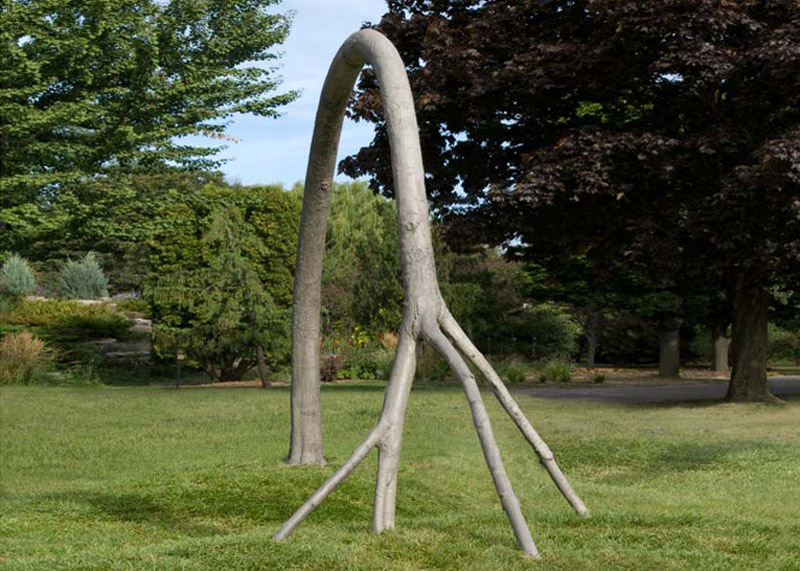
- Artist: Michel de Broin
- Year: 2009
- Medium: Sculpture
- Subject: Salvador Allende
- Location: Montreal, Canada
- 45.50584°N 73.52763°W

The monument dedicated to the memory of Salvador Allende was installed in Parc Jean-Drapeau, on Île Notre-Dame in Montreal on September 11, 2009, the 36th anniversary of the coup d'état in Chile and Salvador Allende's death. The monument was created by artist Michel de Broin in 2009.

Named L'Arc, the monument is in the form of a curved tree whose branches reach down into the ground. L'Arc was designed as a complex symbol whose meaning was to be open to individual interpretation, though de Broin has said that he was inspired by a passage in Salvador Allende's last speech to the Chilean people when he said: "I am certain that the seeds which we have planted in the good conscience of thousands and thousands of Chileans will not be shriveled forever. They have force and will be able to dominate us, but social processes can be arrested by neither crime nor force. History is ours, and people make history." Michel de Broin has also said that the monument represents the connection that Chileans living in Quebec have with the province, while maintaining their roots in Chile. L'Arc also symbolizes the present's memory of the past, and of a re-connection to one's origins.

The monument cost approximately $90,000, with the Chilean community in Montreal contributing $30,000 and the remaining $60,000 supplied by the city of Montreal.
