= Stephanie Comilang =

Filipina-Canadian filmmaker

- Born: 1980 (age 45–46); Toronto, Ontario, Canada
- Known for: Filmmaker and video installation artist
- Awards: Sobey Art Award
- Website: www.cometomeparadise.com

Stephanie Comilang (born 1980) is a Filipina-Canadian artist and filmmaker.

== Background ==
Stephanie Comilang's parents immigrated from the Philippines to Canada in the 1970s to escape the political unrest of Ferdinand Marcos's dictatorship. Growing up in an immigrant household shaped her idea of home and has served as the starting point for much of her artwork. She graduated from the OCAD University in 2006 with a BFA in Integrated Media.

== Artistic career ==
Comilang's work is concerned with the concept of home, often dealing with ideas of diaspora and migration. Her documentary approach in constructing narratives stresses themes of social mobility, global labor, and cross-cultural communication. Through the medium of video, Comilang explores the conditions migrants face, looking at exploitation and adversity that groups endure when leaving a country for reasons beyond their control. An early influence was Perfumed Nightmare (1977) by Filipino film director Kidlat Tahimik, which sparked her interest in cinema and set a precedent for her work. Like Comilang's father, Kidlat Tahimik comes from Baguio, an old American air base on Luzon island in the Philippines; watching films created by such a relatable figure impacted how she began developing her practice.

Comilang characterizes many of her projects as "science-fiction documentaries," because she often combines a documentary approach with fictional elements and narratives. She frequently draws from the visual language of social media, as well as the work of filmmakers like Chris Marker and Agnès Varda. In the New York Times, Dawn Chan writes that "Comilang's artwork reads as both elegy and repartee. Though the subjects she interviews represent a variety of ages, her videos seem consonant with the perspectives of a younger generation raised on an internet that transcends borders. There's a tacit understanding, from that vantage point, that global interconnectedness is all but impossible to reverse."

Comilang's work has been widely shown in solo and group exhibitions in Canada, Europe, and Asia, including at the National Gallery of Canada, Museo Nacional Thyssen-Bornemisza (Madrid), Jameel Arts Centre (Dubai), and Hamburger Bahnhof (Berlin), as well as Sharjah Biennial 16 and Hawai'i Triennial. In 2025, Comilang had her first solo exhibition in the United States at the Center for Art, Research and Alliances titled "An Apparition, A Song".

Her films have been screened at Tate Modern, Rockabund Museum (Shanghai), Kunsthall Trondheim, GHOST:2561 Bangkok Video and Performance Art Triennale, International Film Festival Rotterdam, Asia Art Archive in America (New York), SALTS Basel, and UCLA, among others.

She is represented by Daniel Faria Gallery (Toronto) and ChertLüdde (Berlin).

=== Projects ===
Search for Life (2024–2025) is a film/video installation diptych that examines issues related to labor, migration, colonial and post-colonial power, and diaspora through the figure of the monarch butterfly (episode one) and the pearl (episode two). It was co-commissioned by Museo Nacional Thyssen-Bornemisza, Sharjah Biennial, and The Vega Foundation.

Search for Life (2024) premiered at the Museo Nacional Thyssen-Bornemisza, where it was curated by Chus Martínez. In the large-scale film and textile installation, two facing screens trace the maritime routes used by Spain after the colonization of the Philippines. Central to the narrative is the butterfly, "a symbol of transformation and resistance," who is represented in the work through voiceover. Other figures share stories reflecting on the impact of Spanish colonialism on Filipino culture; it includes interviews with historian Guadalupe Pinzón Ríos; Filipino butterfly specialist Jade Aster T. Badon; a florist, Michael John Díaz, and a painter, Joar Songcuya, who are both Filipino seafarers; and a boy named Simón from Michoacán, Mexico.

Search for Life II (2025) premiered at the Sharjah Biennial, where it was curated by Amal Khalaf. It explores themes of migration, labor, diaspora, and technology through the history and industrialization of pearl diving in the Persian Gulf, the Philippines, and China. In the two-channel installation, the pearl is depicted as both a currency object and speculative subject, connecting global cultures and collapsing past and future through its focus on the stories and songs of an Emirati-Filipina K-pop band and a Sama-Bajau pearl fisher. It contains a massive bead curtain on which one of the videos is projected and a large viewing platform designed to resemble an ocean pier; the installation was called “a centrepiece” of the Sharjah Biennial 16, an exhibition that featured 200 artists.

Piña, Why is the Sky Blue? (2022), a collaboration with artist Simon Speiser, is a video and virtual-reality installation that narrates the story of a spiritual medium and artificial intelligence named Piña, who receives, collects, and transmits ancestral knowledge for future generations. Loosely structured around the history of the pineapple, which connects Ecuador and the Philippines through colonial trade routes, the installation is a "seamless blending of imagined techno-feminist futures with the present-day labors of women shaman and activists." It features interviews with contemporary knowledge-keepers and activists, including Kankwana Canelos and Rupay Gualinga of Ciber Amazonas, a group of Indigenous activists in Puyo, Ecuador, who use radio broadcasts to form feminist alliances; Janet Dolera, a babaylan (spiritual medium) and community leader in the Philippines; and Alba Pavón, an Afro-Ecuadorian organizer of the Black Women's Movement in Pichincha, Ecuador. The figure of Piña appears in the VR component, embodied in human form by model and designer Lukresia. Piña, Why is the Sky Blue? was first presented at the MacKenzie Art Gallery (Regina) in 2022, and subsequently at the Julia Stoschek Collection (Berlin), Gallery TPW (Toronto), Walter Phillips Gallery (Banff), Silverlens (Manila), Museo Antropologico y de Arte Contemporaneo (Guayaquil), and the National Gallery of Canada (Ottawa).

Yesterday, In the Years 1886 and 2017 (2017) consists of a two-channel 10-minute video and installation commissioned by Artspeak in Vancouver.

Lumapit Sa Akin, Paraiso (Come to Me, Paradise) (2016) is a self-proclaimed "science-fiction documentary." Following three Filipina domestic workers, Irish May Salinas, Lyra Ancheta Torbela and Romylyn Presto Sampaga, who reside in Hong Kong, this 25-minute film narrates the digital communication of these women as they relay the realities of their everyday lives and migratory work back to their homes and families. The drone camera that shot most of the video footage is named Paradise, and is voiced by Comilang's mother, Emily Comilang. Paradise functions as both a narrator and also a symbol through which the digital communication of the three protagonists is transmitted. Identifications of being between are meditated upon through the use of technology, attention to time, and the protagonists as subjects of diaspora. Comilang demonstrates the complex ways in which these women must reconcile notions of space and home through the migratory experience.

== Exhibitions ==
Solo exhibitions (selected)

- 2025: Coordinates at Dawn, SCHIRN Kunsthalle Frankfurt
- 2025: An Apparition, A Song, CARA, New York
- 2025: Search For Life I, Bangkok Kunsthalle, Bangkok
- 2024: Search For Life, TBA-21 at Thyssen-Bornemisza Museo Nacional, Madrid
- 2024: Bouquets For Paradise, Daniel Faria Gallery, Toronto
- 2022: How To Make A Painting From Memory, ChertLüdde, Berlin
- 2017: Yesterday In The Years 1886 & 2017, Artspeak, Vancouver

Group exhibitions (selected)

- 2025: To Carry, Sharjah Biennale, Sharjah
- 2025: Aloha Nō, Hawai’i Triennale, Honolulu
- 2024: At the Edge of Land, Jameel Arts Centre, Dubai
- 2024: Spirit Pictures, Berlinische Galerie, Berlin
- 2023: Green Snake, Tai Kwun, Hong Kong
- 2022: Enmeshed, Tate Modern, London
- 2022: Blue Assembly, University of Queensland Art Museum, Brisbane, Australia
- 2021: Nation, Narration, Narcosis, Hamburger Bahnhof, Berlin
- 2019: The Bicycle Thieves, Para Site, Hong Kong
- 2019: It All Makes Sense, Museum of Contemporary Art, Toronto

== Awards ==
In 2019, Comilang was the winner of the Sobey Art Award, Canada's largest prize for visual artists.
