= Zero Yen House =

Art work and publication by artist Kyohei Sakaguchi

Zero Yen House is an exhibition by Japanese architect and artist Kyohei Sakaguchi, inspired by the constructions of Japanese homeless people.

Sakaguchi, a graduate of the Department of Architecture at Waseda University, became interested in "vernacular architecture" whilst a student, and since then has documented the temporary structures created by the homeless in the cities of Tokyo, Osaka and Nagoya. In 2004, he published a book, Zero Yen Houses, which contained photographs of many of these constructions.

The exhibition includes video footage, sketches, large ink-jet prints, a detailed architectural drawing of a zero-yen house, and a full-scale replica of one such structure entitled An Evolving House (the original, in Tokyo, was built by an unnamed camera engineer).

Sakaguchi sees the zero yen house as uniquely Japanese phenomenon, rooted in the austerity of traditional Japanese Buddhism.
