= Jason de Haan =

Canadian artist

- Born: c. 1981; Edmonton, Alberta, Canada
- Movement: Contemporary art
- Awards: Sobey Art Award (2010)
- Website: https://www.jasondehaan.com/

Jason de Haan is a Canadian artist (born c. 1981) (Note: In 1996, the Edmonton Journal reported that de Haan was 15. The difference between the year of 1996 and the age of 15 gives an approximate birth year of 1981.)

== Background ==
De Haan was born in Edmonton, Alberta. He received his Bachelor of Fine Arts in drawing from Alberta College of Art and Design in 2006. In 2015, de Haan received an MFA from Milton Avery Graduate School of the Arts at Bard College in New York state.

== Work ==
de Haan's work, which is primarily contemporary art and collage, has been shown at galleries and museums such as the Art Gallery of Alberta, the Museum of Mexico City, the Massachusetts Museum of Contemporary Art, the Sequences Art Festival in Reykjavik, and presented by curators such as Makiko Hara. Jason de Haan has worked as an instructor at the Alberta University of the Arts. In 2020, Jason de Haan received the Sobey Art Award, Canada's largest prize for young Canadian artists.

== See also ==
- Makiko Hara
- Sobey Art Award
