= Jacynthe Carrier =

Canadian artist

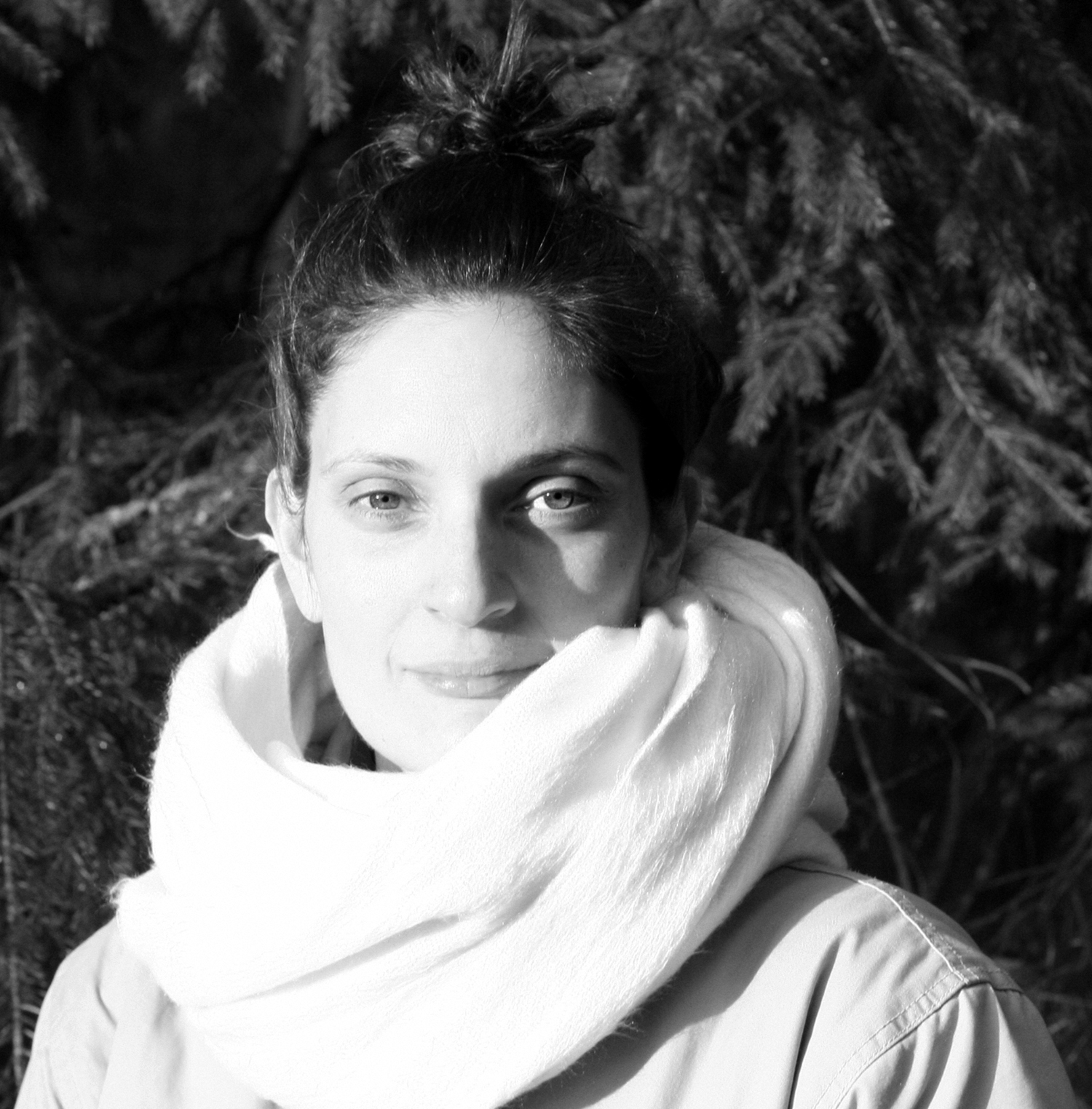
- Born: 1982 (age 42–43); Lévis, Quebec
- Website: jacynthecarrier.com

Jacynthe Carrier (born 1982) is a Canadian artist.

== Education ==
Carrier holds a BFA degree in visual and media arts from the Université du Québec à Montréal and a Master of Fine Arts degree in photography from Concordia University.

== Solo exhibitions ==
- Défoncer les murs, Le Diamant, Québec, 2019
- Paysage : faire le jour, Musée d'art de Joliette, 2018
- La lignée, Sobey Art Award, Art Museum, Toronto, 2017
- Cycle, Centre Clark, Montreal, 2016
- Les Eux, La Bande Vidéo, Quebec, 2014
- Parcours, Centre occurrence, Montreal, 2012

== Awards and collections ==
Carrier was a finalist for the 2017 Sobey Prize. Her work is included in the collections of the Musée national des beaux-arts du Québec and the Musée des beaux-arts de Montréal.
