= Gallery 1C03 =

Art gallery in Winnipeg, Manitoba, Canada

Coordinates: 49°53′32″N 97°09′11″W

- Established: 1986-7
- Location: Centennial Hall, University of Winnipeg in Winnipeg, Manitoba, Canada.
- Website: Gallery 1C03

Gallery 1C03 is the University of Winnipeg campus art gallery in Winnipeg, Manitoba, Canada. It opened in September 1986. The gallery has hosted more than 100 exhibitions and had over 125,000 visitors.

Gallery 1C03 engages diverse communities through the development and presentation of contemporary and historical art exhibitions and related programming initiatives. The Gallery is also responsible for the development, preservation and presentation of the University’s permanent art collection.

Gallery 1C03 shows a variety of subjects and media. Paintings, prints, drawings, photographs, sculptures, textiles, ceramics, furniture, installations, performances, and videos have all been featured. Art that deals with questions of history, politics, technology, feminism, sexuality, ethnicity, and other issues has been displayed to intersect with various programs of study at the University. Typically, the gallery highlights the work of contemporary Manitoban and Canadian artists. The gallery has also exhibited work by artists from the United States, Mexico, Peru, Germany, Spain, Finland, Ukraine, China, and Australia.

Gallery 1C03 is located on the first floor of the university's Centennial Hall building.
