= Lani Maestro =

Filipino-Canadian artist (born 1957)

- Born: May 12, 1957 (age 69); Philippines
- Education: University of the Philippines (BFA), Nova Scotia College of Art and Design (MFA)
- Known for: Artist
- Awards: 2012 Hnatyshyn Foundation Visual Arts Awards

Lani Maestro (born 1957) is a Filipino-Canadian artist who divides her time between France and Canada. She works in installation, sound, video, bookworks and writing. Her works deal with investigations of memory, forgetting, language, silence, and the ethics of care. From 1990 to 1994, Maestro was co-founder and editor of HARBOUR Magazine of Art and Everyday Life, a journal of artworks and writings by artists, writers and theorists.

== Early life and education ==
Maestro was born in Manila and studied at the University of the Philippines where she received a BFA. Maestro spent her childhood in the Philippines, influencing her textile installation Cradle at Hallwalls in Buffalo, New York. Maestro lived in Manila until she immigrated to Canada in 1982. She pursued an MFA at the reputedly avant-garde art school, Nova Scotia College of Art & Design in Halifax. She taught studio arts at the Nova Scotia College Of Art and Design (NSCAD University) and University of Lethbridge. From 1990 until 2000, she conducted graduate seminars in the MFA program at Concordia University.

== Selected exhibition history ==
Maestro's large scale installations have been mostly commissioned site specific works. In 2013 and 2014, Paysage Industriel (Foundation France), "ces Mains" and "Limen" were constructed in defunct jewellery and shoe factories in the villages of Ardeche and Moussey, France. In 2010, "L'oublie de l'air (The Forgetting of Air") was shown at the Darling Foundry, Montreal with the collaboration of American composer, Malcolm Goldstein. In the same year, "No Pain Like This Body" opened at Centre A International Centre for Contemporary Asian Art in Vancouver, Canada. Expanded versions of the installation/exhibition were shown at Plug In, Winnipeg (2011) and mo_space, Manila (2015). In 2006, Susan Gibson-Garvey curated "sing mother (twilight eats you)" at Dalhousie Art Gallery in Halifax, Nova Scotia. In 2005, "je suis toi." (i am you.) opened at Eglise Saint Nicolas for the Centre d'art contemporaine de Base Normandie, Caen. Earlier solo exhibitions with the art centre included "Paramita" in the exhibition, "Ohrenlust", 1997. In the 1990s, Maestro's work was featured for the exhibition, "Perspectives", at the Art Gallery of Ontario, Toronto.

== Selected group exhibition ==
- Shrines (2023), Silverlens, New York, USA
- The Spectre Of Comparison (2019), Museum of Contemporary Art and Design (MCAD) Manila, Manila, Philippines
- Points of Ellipsis... (2011), Osage Gallery, Hong Kong

=== Participation in international biennales ===
- Singapore Biennale (2019)
- Maestro represented the Philippines at the Venice Biennale with artist Manuel Ocampo (2017)
- Busan Biennale, Busan, Korea (2004)
- Shanghai Biennial, Shanghai, China (2001)
- The Third Asia-Pacific Triennial of Contemporary Art, Brisbane, Australia (1999)
- The 11th Biennale of Sydney (1998)
- The Fifth Istanbul Biennial (1997)
- The Segunda and the Quinta Bienal dela Habana (Havana Biennial) (1986,1994)
- The Canadian Biennial of Contemporary Art (1989)

== Awards ==
Among her many awards is the Segunda Bienal de la Habana in Cuba in 1985, the Hnatyshyn Award for artistic excellence and outstanding achievement by a Canadian artist in the visual arts in 2012. In 2018, she received an Honorary Doctorate Honoris Causa from NSCAD University in Canada.

== Publications ==
- Lani Maestro: Sing Mother (twilight eats you) by Susan Gibson Garvey (2007) Dalhousie Art Gallery ISBN 978-0-7703-2749-1
- je suis toi by Catherine Grout (2006) Wharf, Centre d'art contemporain de Basse-Normandie ISBN 978-2-909127-40-8
- Lani Maestro "her rain by Erin Moure (2011) Centre A - Vancouver International Centre for Contemporary Asian Art/ Plug In Institute of Contemporary Art (Winnipeg). ISBN 9780981010090
- Lani Maestro: Chambres de quiétude/ Quiet Rooms by Rene Baert (2001) Gallerie De L'UQAM ISBN 2-920325-07-8
- Paramita by Masashi Ogura (2001) Centre d'Art Contemporain de Basse-Normandie (Hérouville St-Clair, France) ISBN 9782909127293
- Cradle/Ugoy: Lani Maestro by Carolyn Forchê, Rina Carvajal, Stephen Horne (1996) ISBN 9781883967055
