= Michel de Broin =

Canadian sculptor (born 1970)

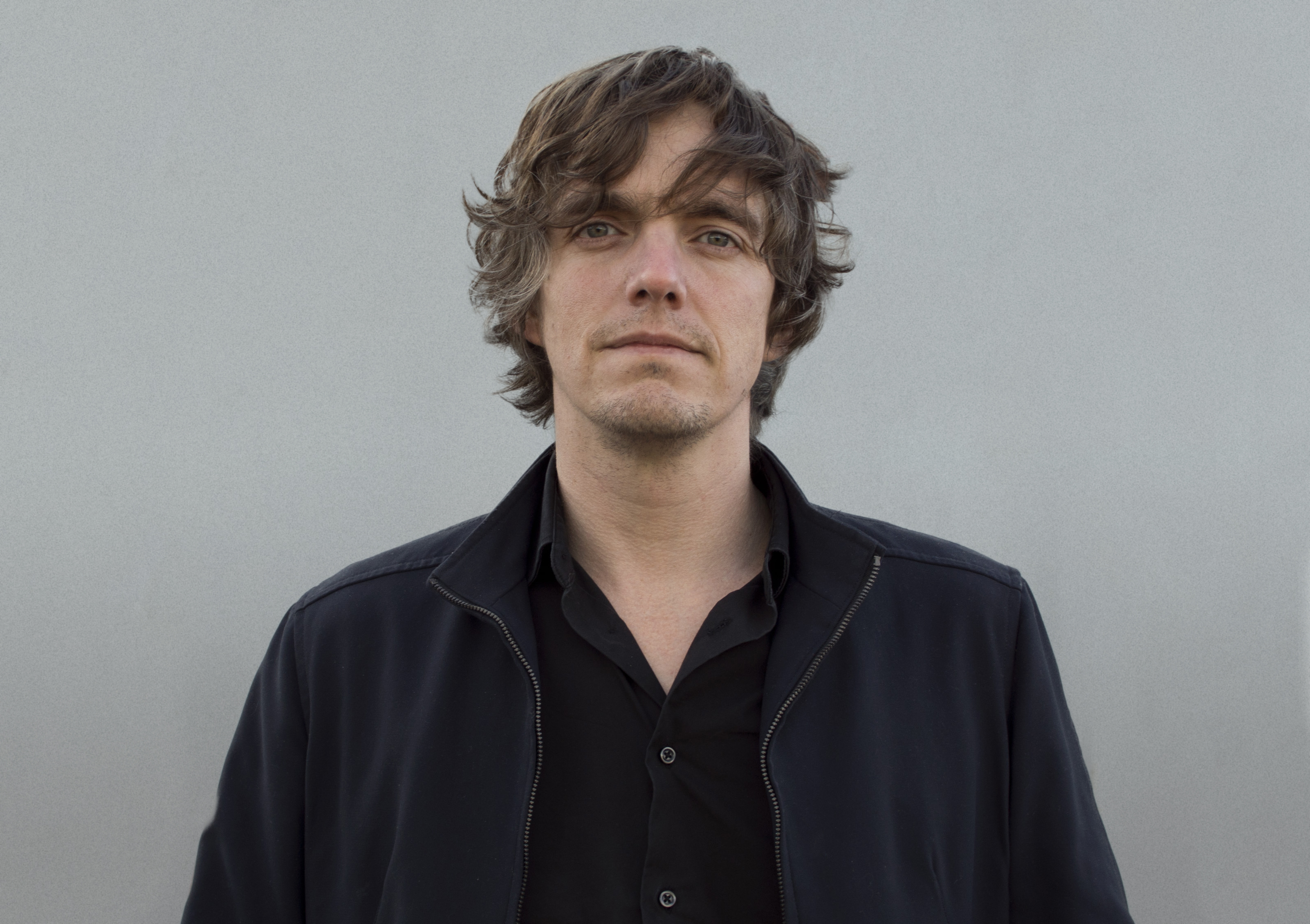
- Born: 1970 (age 55–56); Montreal, Quebec, Canada
- Education: Concordia University; UQÀM
- Occupation: Visual artist
- Known for: sculptor
- Awards: Sobey Art Award (2007)
- Website: micheldebroin.org

Michel de Broin (born 1970 in Montreal, Quebec) is a Canadian sculptor. De Broin has created numerous public artworks in Canada and Europe, including the Salvador Allende monument in Montreal. He was the recipient of the 2007 Sobey Art Award.

== Life ==
Michel de Broin was born in Montreal, Quebec in 1970. He studied studio arts at Concordia University, receiving a Bachelor of Fine Arts in 1995, and at UQÀM where he received a Master of Fine Arts degree in 1997. After starting his career in Montreal, from 2005 he lived in Paris, London and Berlin before returning to Montreal in 2011.

== Interdisciplinary practice ==
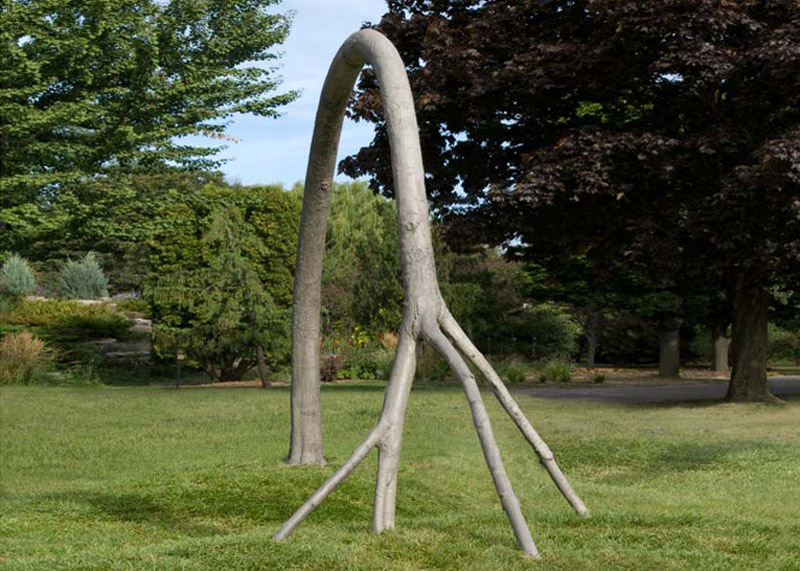
L'Arc, 2009, monument to Salvador Allende, Montreal

Since the 1990s, Michel de Broin has developed an interdisciplinary practice that questions the limits of social and technical systems. He often incorporates humour and playfulness in his work, but also critique. Energy and resistance are recurrent themes in his practice. De Broin also uses video, performance, drawing, photography and found objects in his work. Many of the objects he has created consist of a détournement of familiar objects and forms that turn back against themselves to show their internal paradoxes. Conceptual art is a source of inspiration for his practice. For example, in his show "Dangerous Substance" (Matière dangereuse, 1999), he reinterpreted Kasimir Malevitch's famous "black square on white ground".

== Main works ==
Shared Propulsion Car consists of a wrecked Buick 1986 car whose engine was replaced by bicycle pedals. It was presented in New York at Exit Art and Toronto at Mercer Union. A Toronto policeman issued a ticket for "Operating an Unsafe Vehicle" to Dean Baldwin, the driver of the pedal car, but the charge was later dismissed in court.

Black Whole Conference consists of a group of chairs attached to each other at the legs to create a sphere. It is part of the collection of the Musée d'art contemporain du Val-de-Marne.

Overflow, a piece in the ruined remains of an old Toronto prison chapel, consisted of a waterfall bursting out of a window.

La maîtresse de la Tour Eiffel was created for the Nuit Blanche in Paris (2009). It consists of a 26 feet mirror ball made of 1000 mirrors and suspended from a crane 150 feet above the Luxembourg Garden. The mirror ball broke a Guinness World Record.

Majestic was presented as a satellite project of New Orleans Biennal in 2011. Lamposts blown down by hurricane Katrina were assembled in the shape of a star. The sculpture was acquired by the National Gallery of Canada thanks to a donation by the philanthropists Donald and Beth Sobey.

== Public art ==
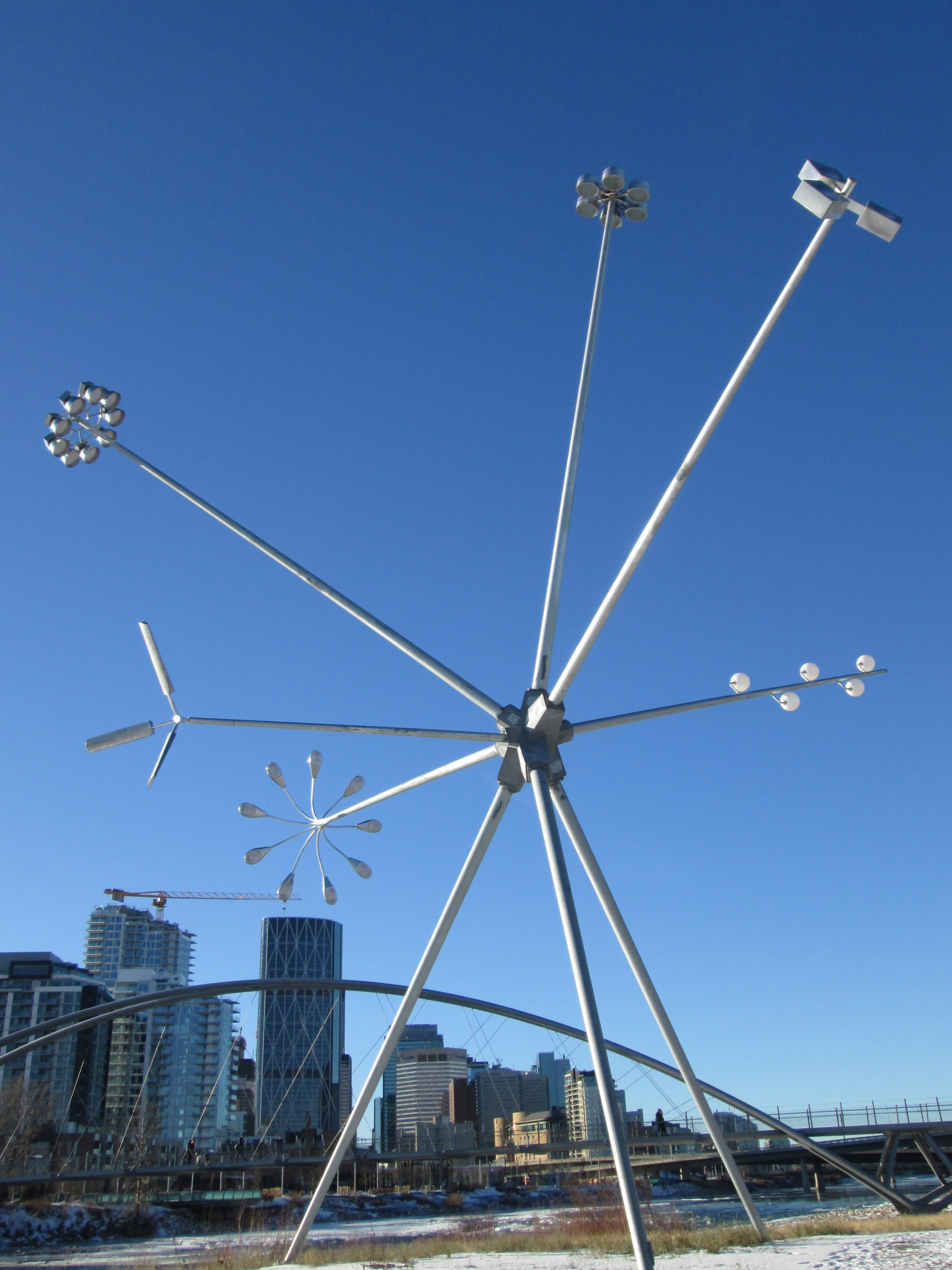
Bloom, Michel de Broin, St. Patrick's Island, Calgary, Alberta 2015

De Broin's sculpture entitled Bloom, which was inaugurated in August 2015, is "one of the most visible landmarks on Calgary's St. Patrick's Island. The sculpture, which was commissioned by the Calgary Municipal Land Corporation, is "23 metres-high, with working lights on many of its branches that illuminate its surroundings at night."

Révolutions is a sculpture representing a staircase twisted into a knot. It was installed in 2003 during the renovation of Papineau metro station in Montreal.

Monument is a sculpture installed in a parc of Winnipeg in 2009. It reinterprets the classical theme of drapery by presenting two ghostly characters standing under a sheet.

L'Arc (2009) is a monument commemorating Salvador Allende. It is situated on the île Notre-Dame in Montreal.

== Awards ==
In 2006, he received the Prix Reconnaissance UQAM. In 2007, he received the Sobey Art Award.

== Selected exhibitions ==
2013

- Solo show at the Musée d'art contemporain de Montréal

2012

- Oh Canada, Massachusetts Museum of Contemporary Art, North Adams, MA, USA

2011

- Car Fetish. I drive therefore I am, Museum Tinguely, Basel, Suisse
- Parking de sculptures, Le Confort Moderne, Poitiers, France

2009

- La Maîtresse de la Tour Eiffel, Nuit Blanche, Paris, France
- Disruption from Within, Plug In, Winnipeg, Manitoba, Canada

2008

- Nothing is lost, nothing is created, everything is transformed, Musée d'art contemporain de Montréal, Montreal, Quebec, Canada
- Énergie Reciproque, Museum of Contemporary Art of Val-de-Marne, Vitry-sur-Seine, France
- Nuit Blanche, Toronto, Ontario, Canada
- Acclimatation, Centre d'art Villa Arson, Nice, France

2007

- De-con-struction, National Gallery of Canada, Ottawa, Ontario, Canada
- Machinations, UQAM Gallery, Montreal, Quebec, Canada

2006

- Michel de Broin; Machinations Musée national des beaux-arts du Québec, Québec, Canada
- Reverse Entropy, Künstlerhaus Bethanien, Berlin, Germany
- Réparations, National Gallery of Canada, Ottawa, Ontario, Canada

2003

- Damage Control, Museum of Canadian Contemporary Art, Toronto, Ontario, Canada

2002

- Épater la Galerie, Villa Merkel, Esslingen am Neckar, Germany

== See also ==
- Public art
- Sculpture
- Détournement
