= France Jodoin =

Canadian contemporary artist (born 1961)

- Known for: Painting & printmaking
- Website: Artist website

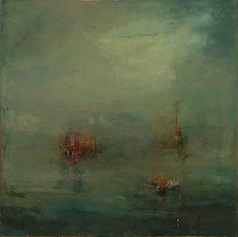
Un manteau frangé de bleu (2011) by France Jodoin

France Jodoin (born 1961) is a Canadian contemporary artist known for her maritime scenes. Painted in a semi-abstract style, her work is a modern interpretation of European Romanticism. Her work is found in Quebec museums, and in galleries in Canada, France and the United States.

== Early life ==
Jodoin was born 1961 in Sainte-Madeleine, Quebec, a rural community in Monteregie. A graduate of the University of Ottawa in Ontario, Jodoin attended the Ottawa School of Art and the Saidye Bronfman Centre in Montreal. In 2000, she moved to Montreal where she participated in group shows at Cirque du Soleil, and at Thomas More Institute Annual Art Exhibition at Galerie Loto-Quebec. Her first solo exhibition was mounted at Sylvianne Poirier Art Contemporain (Montreal) in 2002.

== Career ==
In 2004, as artist-in-residence at Pouch Cove, Newfoundland, Jodoin painted scenes of ships at sea. By 2009, nomads and wanderers became her dominant theme, represented by "boats without sails". Painted with fine lines in oil on linen, her style is likened to European Romanticism, and is described as a "bold take" on landscapes by Victorian painter J. M. W. Turner. In 2009-11, a series of solo exhibitions at Beaux-arts des Amériques (Montreal), The Weiss Gallery (Calgary), and at Galerie Saint-Laurent + Hill (Ottawa) established her reputation in Canada.

In 2012, Jodoin exhibited with artist Kevin Sonmor at the Musee des beaux-arts de Sherbrooke. Curated by museum director Sarah Boucher, the exhibition led to interviews with Patrick Masbourian and Jacquie Czernin in Montreal, and favourable reviews. At the same time, a Quebec ministry publicized Jodoin's exhibition with sculptors Nathalie Gauglin and Patrick Cady at Galerie Theo de Seine in Paris.

Following a trip to India in 2011, Jodoin’s iconography increasingly included figures, florals, birds and, in 2013, animals. A student of intaglio, aquatint and etching at Atelier Circulaire (Montreal), her 2012 solo show at the Centre d’art de Kamouraska, Quebec, and 2013 solo exhibition at Musée Bruck in Cowansville, Quebec, included works on paper as well as paintings. During this period, Jodoin exhibited internationally at Pryor Fine Art in Atlanta, with gallery Beaux-arts des Amériques at Art Naples in Florida (2011), and with Boston’s Newbury Gallery at Art Hamptons in New York (2013). In May 2015 she was an artist-in-residence at the Cill Rialaig Project, Ballinskelligs, County Kerry, Ireland.

Jodoin's work is found in the collections of the Musee des beaux-arts de Sherbrooke, Centre d'art de Kamouraska, Cirque du Soleil and in private collections.

Jodoin lives and works in Cowansville, Quebec, and is married to Canadian artist Kevin Sonmor.

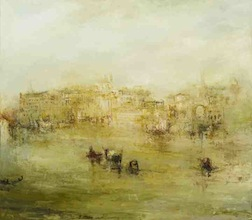
Échos (2011) Musée des beaux-arts de Sherbrooke

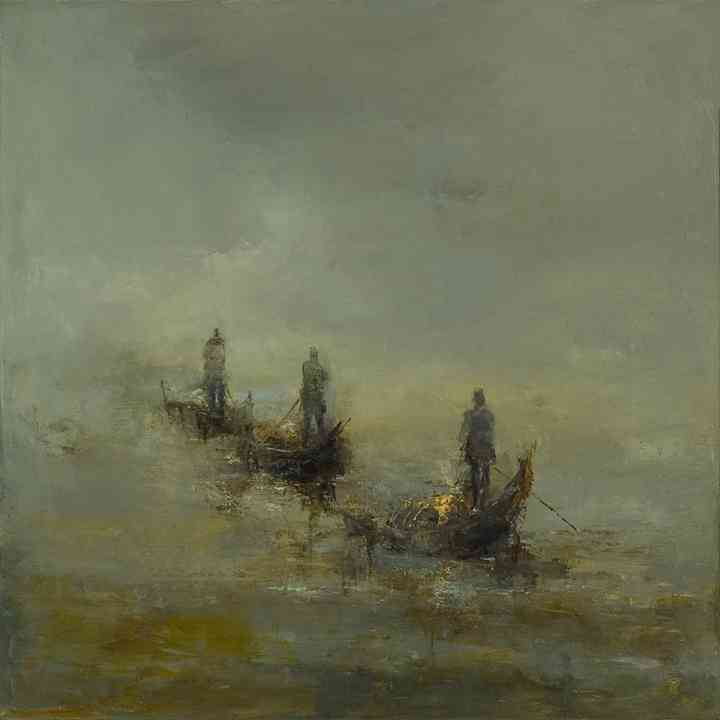
L'incantation du temps (2011) Musée des beaux-arts de Sherbrooke

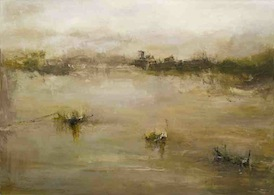
J'ai tendu un hamac aux mailles liquides (2011) Centre d'art de Kamouraska

== References and links ==
Further Reading:

- Chassé, Bernard. "Intuition" France Jodoin: Nomades/Wanderers, (editors Lefebvre Glaubinger, Lucienne and Hébert Stoneberger, Jacqueline). Montreal: 2010. Print. Web copy.
