= Cynthia Girard-Renard =

Canadian artist

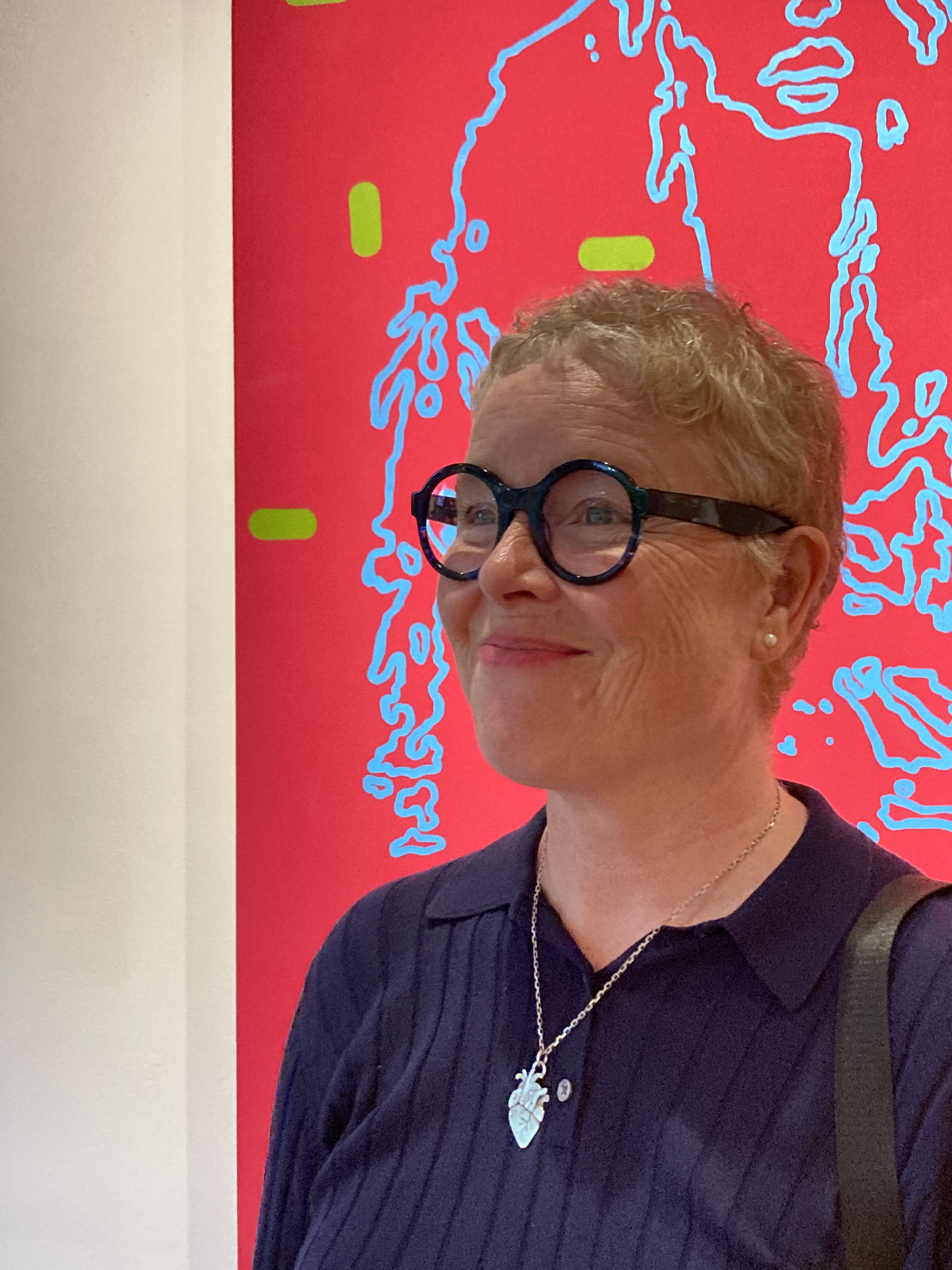
- Born: 1969 (age 56–57); Montreal, Quebec, Canada
- Education: Université du Québec à Montréal (BFA); Goldsmiths, University of London (MFA)
- Website: www.cynthiagirardrenard.ca

Cynthia Girard-Renard (born 1969), also known as Cynthia Girard, is a Canadian artist.

== Education ==
Girard-Renard earned their Bachelor of Fine Arts from Université du Québec à Montréal and their Master of Fine Arts from Goldsmiths, University of London in 1998.

== Career ==
In 1995, Girard-Renard released a collection of poetry titled "A Disappeared Death." In 2008, they participated in a group exhibition titled "Triennale québécoise" which was displayed at Musée d'art contemporain de Montréal. The following year, their solo exhibit "Tous les oiseaux sont ici" was on display In Berlin.

In 2016, their piece "Les Sans-culottes" was on display at the Hugues Charbonneau Gallery. The series of puppets, banners and paintings was worked on by Girard-Renard during their 2015, residency and was meant to reimagine the French Revolution. She displayed a second solo exhibit at the gallery in 2018 titled, "Love and Anarchy," after the film by the same name.

In 2017, their satirical painting series "Our Mad Masters" was on display at Musée d'art de Joliette. The title was derived from Jean Rouch’s anthropological film the 1995 film Les maîtres fous. While working as an artist in resident at Concordia University, her solo exhibition "La Main Invisible" was picked up at the McClure Gallery. As well, their work "No Foreigners" was on display at the National Gallery of Canada for the 2017 Canadian Biennial.

In 2018, they were one of the first recipients of the Takao Tanabe Purchase Prize in Painting for Young Artists. Later that year, they were awarded the Prix Louis-Comtois by the Association of Contemporary Art Galleries (AGAC) and the City of Montreal.

== Collections ==
Their work is included in the collections of the National Gallery of Canada, the Musée national des beaux-arts du Québec, and the Musée d'art contemporain de Montréal.
