= Raphaëlle de Groot =

Canadian artist

Raphaëlle de Groot (born October 21, 1974) is a Canadian artist and educator living and working in Montreal, Quebec.

She was born in Montreal, Quebec. She received a MFA from the Université du Québec à Montréal (UQAM). She has lectured on visual and media arts at UQAM. She has also been an invited artist and lecturer at Concordia University.

In an early work Dévoilements (Unveilings) (1998–2001), nuns from the Religious Hospitallers of St. Joseph in Montreal collaborated with the artist in the production of the work. In later exhibitions, de Groot has invited visitors to participate by taking photographs or leaving with parts of her installation. She has also recycled material from earlier exhibitions in her work.

Her work has been shown in solo exhibitions across Canada and in Europe. She participated in the group exhibitions Femmes artistes at the Musée national des beaux-arts du Québec in 2010 and Archi-Féministes at the Centre Optica in Montreal in 2012.

De Groot received the Pierre-Ayot Award in 2006 and the Sobey Art Award in 2012. She participated in the 2008 Québec Triennial and represented Quebec at the 2013 Venice Biennale. She received the Prix Graff in 2011.

Her work is included in public and private collections, including the Montreal Museum of Fine Arts, the Musée d'art contemporain de Montréal, the Musée national des beaux-arts du Québec and the city of Montreal.
