= Sophie Jodoin =

Canadian artist

- Born: 1965 (age 60–61); Montreal, Quebec, Canada
- Education: Concordia University
- Known for: Drawing
- Website: Sophie Jodoin

Sophie Jodoin (born 1965) is a Canadian visual artist based in Montreal. Jodoin is known chiefly for her figurative, drawing-based practice in traditional media as well as collage, video, and altered found objects.

== Education ==
Jodoin received her Bachelor of Fine Arts in 1988 in Visual Arts from Concordia University in Montreal.

== Work ==
Jodoin has worked almost exclusively in black-and-white since 2004, and first showed works integrating drawing and collage in 2009, sourcing images from magazines, the Internet, personal photos and books. In Jodoin's drawing, the lack of objective figures gives people a feeling that there is no narration. One exception that contains didactic intent is Yesterday and Tomorrow, which consists of a series of drawings. Those pictures showed a young girl wearing a white silk dress walking through a corridor.

John A. Parks described Jodoin's work as having "a rich and sensual language of mark and gesture to build images suggestive of horror and violence in a fashion that is curiously affecting." In 2015, Jodoin described her works as linked to "the monstous," and that it had shifted from "themes of pain, violence, mortality or innocence despoiled" to "a sense of disquiet."

In 2017, Jodoin was awarded the Prix Louis-Comtois by the Association des galeries d'art contemporain.

== Solo exhibitions ==
- d’un seul souff, Artexte, Montréal, Québec 2023
- Room(s) to move: je, tu, elle, Musée d’art contemporain des Laurentides, Saint-Jérôme, Québec 2018
- une certaine instabilité émotionnelle, Battat Contemporary, Montréal, Québec 2015
- Volta NY Fair, New York, NY 2012
- close your eyes, Richmond Art Gallery, Richmond, British Columbia 2012
- Small Dramas & Little Nothings, Union Gallery, Queens University, Kingston, Ontario 2012
- Small Chronicles of Everyday Violence, Musée d’art de Joliette, Québec. Curated by Marie-Claude Landry 2011
- I felt a cleaving in my mind, Battat Contemporary, Montréal, Québec. Curated by Susannah Wesley 2011
- You have to kill a whole to get a little, Oboro, Montréal, Québec 2011
- Small Dramas & Little Nothings, Invited Artist, Ottawa School of Art, Ontario 2010
- The Cherished Ones, Newzones, Calgary, Alberta 2010
- De peine et de misère, Centre Clark, Montréal, Québec 2010
- Nous sommes en manque, National Center for the Arts - French Theatre, Ottawa, Ontario. Invited by director Wajdi Mouawad 2009
- Sophie Jodoin: Head-Games: hoods, helmets & gasmasks, Battat Contemporary, Montréal, Québec 2009
- Vigils, Newzones, Calgary, Alberta 2009
- Small Dramas & Little Nothings, Maison des Arts de Laval, Laval, Québec. Curated by Danielle Lord 2009
- Sophie Jodoin: Head-Games: hoods, helmets & gasmasks, Connexion Gallery, organised by UNB Art Centre, Fredericton, New-Brunswick 2008
- Regiment, McClure Gallery, Visual Arts Centre, Montréal, Québec; travelled to Nanaimo Art Gallery, Nanaimo, B.C. 2007
- Regiment, Edward Day Gallery, Toronto, Ontario 2007
- Diary of K.: a journal of drawings (part II), Newzones, Calgary, Alberta 2005
- Diary of K.: a journal of drawings (part I), Edward Day Gallery, Toronto, Ontario 2005
- Drawing Shadows; portraits of my mother, Edward Day Gallery, Toronto, Ontario 2004
- Figures Undressing, Edward Day Gallery, Toronto, Ontario 2003
- Sophie Jodoin, Galerie de Bellefeuille, Montréal, Québec 2000
- Architectures, Centre d’exposition des Gouverneurs, Sorel, Québec 1997
- Centre d’exposition l’Imagier, Aylmer, Québec 1996
- Portraits, Observatoire 4, Montréal, Québec 1995
- Portraits, Galerie d'Art d'Outremont 1995
- Galerie 101, Ottawa, Ontario 1994
- Centre Clark, Montréal, Québec 1992
