= Emmanuelle Léonard =

Canadian artist

- Born: 1971 (age 54–55); Montreal, Quebec
- Website: emmanuelleleonard.org

Emmanuelle Léonard (born 1971) is a Canadian photographer and Video artist.

== Education ==
Léonard received an MFA degree in visual and media art from the Université du Québec à Montréal in 2002.

== Work ==
Léonard's creative practice explores the aesthetic dimensions of documentary styles as well as the ideas of institutional authority and power. She is particularly interested in legal photography and administrative archives, which she manipulates to question and explore the idea of proof.

== Collections ==
Her work is included in the collections of the Musée national des beaux-arts du Québec and the Musée d'art contemporain de Montréal.
