= Tsēmā Igharas =

Tahtan artist

Tsēma Igharas
- Education: Emily Carr University of Art and Design, OCAD University
- Website: tsema.ca

Tsēma Igharas, formerly known as Tamara Skubovius, is an interdisciplinary artist and member of the Tāłtān First Nation based in Vancouver, British Columbia. Igharas uses Potlatch methodology in making art, to assert the relationships between bodies and the world, and to challenge colonial systems of value and measurement of land and resources.

== Early life and education ==
Igharas was raised in Smithers, British Columbia and on Tāłtān territory. Igharas earned a Bachelor of Fine Arts from Emily Carr University of Art and Design in 2011, and went on to receive an Interdisciplinary Master’s in Art, Media, and Design from OCAD University in 2016, receiving the OCADU President’s Scholarship. For her graduate thesis, Igharas presented LAND | MINE, a materials library which linked bodies and mining sites to the land. In 2005 to 2006, Igharas also attended the Kitinmaax School for Northwest Coast Indian Art at ‘Ksan in Hazelton, BC, which influenced her current Potlatch methodology.

== Art ==
Igharas’ practice can be understood through the methodology of Potlatch, a ceremony rooted in reciprocity and nation building. For Igharas, artmaking becomes a “ceremony that affirms and solidifies relationships to every thing and body”. Her conceptual artwork primarily tackles colonial systems of valuing land and resources, and Western measurements of wealth, and examines the way these systems historically and continue to impact Indigenous lands and cultural practices. Igharas' practice is influenced by Indigenous resistance strategies, familial and embodied knowledge, and acts of decolonization, in order to understand the Canadian imaginary and the impacts of its industrialization; Igharas also aligns with Indigenous Futurisms as a way of understanding our relationship with time and the land.

In the exhibition future generations at Artspace, Toronto, Igharas examined Indigenous futurity as a means of survival and survivance. Through working with her understandings of Tāłtān traditions, and objects and materials rooted in Western settler culture, Igharas presented strategies and gestures of resistance against neo-colonization, and imagined futures of Indigenous peoples.

The series and workshop Riot Rock Rattles at the Gardiner Museum, Toronto, continues Igharas’ examination of the material relationships between the body and the land. In the workshop, participants build and engage with Igharas’ “riot rocks” – rocks imbued with materials of cultural, industrial, and resistive significance – in order to communally practice Indigenous methodologies and gain an awareness of the connections between body and land.

== Selected exhibitions ==
Igharas has exhibited across Canada and internationally, in places such as Chiapas, Mexico; Asheville, USA; and Santiago, Chile. Notable exhibitions include Interweavings, which featured emerging First Nations artists who had won the YVR Art Foundation scholarship; the Contemporary Native Art Biennial: Culture Shift in Montreal; and the Luminato Festival in Toronto. Igharas is also a member and representative of ReMatriate Collective.

=== Solo exhibitions ===
- 2008 Originated, Aboriginal Student Exhibit, Concourse Gallery, Emily Carr University of Art and Design, Vancouver BC
- 2009 Internal | External, Aboriginal Student Exhibition, Concourse Gallery, Emily Carr University of Art and Design, Vancouver BC
- 2010 Bloodlines, Aboriginal Student Exhibition, Curator, Concourse Gallery, Emily Carr University of Art and Design, Vancouver, BC
- 2010 In order to contemplate the making for the live biennale, Performance, White Chapel Gallery, Vancouver BC
- 2011 Grand Entry, Aboriginal Student Exhibition, Concourse Gallery, Emily Carr University of Art and Design, Vancouver BC
- 2011 Please Do Not Touch, Ceramic Exhibition, Concourse Gallery, Emily Carr University of Art and Design, Vancouver, BC
- 2011 Petroglyphs, Performance, Satellite Gallery, Vancouver BC
- 2015 Where are you (really) from?, Nuit Blanche, Toronto ON
- 2016 Post-Performance / Discussion-Action by Maria Hupfield, “Typist” (Performance Assistant), MONOMYTHS Progress Festival and FADO
- 2016 Hearings. Researching Historical Sites initiative, Todmordon Mills, Toronto ON
- 2016 LAND|MINE, MFA Thesis Exhibition, OCADu Student Gallery, Toronto, ON
- 2016 Ore Body, ImagiNative Film and Media Festival, Gallery 44, Toronto ON, Canada
- 2017 Your Indigenous Tour Guide, FUSE Performance; Vancouver Art Gallery, Vancouver BC, Canada
- 2017 Tree Temporality, Open Space Gallery & OCAD University. Toronto ON, Canada
- 2017 Feminist Art Museum, Leslie Spit, Evergreen Brickworks and The Gardner Museum, Toronto ON, Canada
- 2019 future generations, Artspace Peterborough, ON, Canada
- 2019 La Biennale d'art Contemporain autochtone (BACA) The Contemporary Native Art Biennial- 4th editio níchiwamiskwém | nimidet | ma sœur |
- my sister, Art Mur, Montreal, QU, Canada

=== Group exhibitions ===
- 2009 Art Hamlet, The Old Church Venue, Smithers BC
- 2014 Interweavings, Richmond Art Gallery (RAG), Richmond, BC
- 2015 Coming to the Fire, Roundhouse, Vancouver, BC
- 2015 Make Re|make Un|make: Repetition and the Artistic Process Group Exhibit, Seymour Art Gallery, North Vancouver, BC
- 2015 México es una Fosa Común (Mexico is a Mass Grave), Public Group Performance directed by Jesusa Rodríguez as part of the Hemispheric Institute of Performance and Politics course, “Art, Migration and Human Rights” San Cristóbal de las Casas, Chiapas, Mexico
- 2015 Envelopments: Paths Taken and Not Taken, Robert Kananaj Gallery, Toronto, ON
- 2016 OMEGA: I Am Woman, Windsor Gallery, Vancouver, BC
- 2016 Reflections, OCADu Student Gallery, Toronto, ON
- 2016. Reverb: Sound Seeds, Performance collaboration with Julie Nagam as part of the Hemispheric Institute of Performance and Politics Encuentro, "eXcéntrico: dissidence, sovereignties, performance," Santiago, Chile
- 2016. Doomsday; A Survival Guide, Luminato Festival, Toronto ON.
- 2016. Future 33, YTB Gallery, Toronto ON.
- 2017 There is Bread and Salt Between Us, Open Space Gallery, Toronto ON, Canada
- 2017. What is Left? / What is Right?, Forrest City Gallery, London, ON, Canada
- 2017 Woodland School, Drawing a Line from January to December, SBC Gallery for Contemporary Art Montreal, QU, Canada
- 2018 INSURGENCE/RESURGENCE, Winnipeg Art Gallery, Winnipeg, MB Canada
- 2018 Crafted Strangers, Center for Craft, Creativity and Design, Asheville, NC USA
- 2019 qaʔ yəxʷ, Bill Reid Gallery, Vancouver, BC Canada

== Awards ==
2006, '08. YVR Art Foundation Scholarship / YVR Art Foundation Scholarship Emily Carr University Collaboration Scholarship

2010. Alberta Centennial Award

2013. First Peoples Cultural Counsel Individual Artist Award

2014. President’s Scholarship, Entrance scholarship to OCAD University

2015. OCAD President’s Scholarship

2016. Banff Centre For the Arts Financial Assistance

2016. OCAD University Ontario Graduate Scholarship

2016. OAC Exhibition Assistance. Ore Body, Gallery 44, Toronto ON, Canada

2017. YVR Art Foundation Masterpiece Study Grant

2018. Emily Award
