= Manon Labrecque =

Canadian artist (1965–2023)

- Born: 1965; Saint-Évariste-de-Forsyth, Quebec
- Died: 2023 (aged 57–58)
- Website: manonlabrecque.com

Manon Labrecque (1965 – 2023) is a Canadian artist based in Montreal.

In 2007, she was awarded the artistic creation prize at the Rendez-vous du cinéma québécois. In 2013, she won the Prix Louis-Comtois for mid-career artists. Her work is included in the collections of the Musée national des beaux-arts du Québec, the Montreal Museum of Fine Arts and the National Gallery of Canada

== Links ==
Official website
