= Kyohei Sakaguchi =

Japanese artist and architect (born 1978)

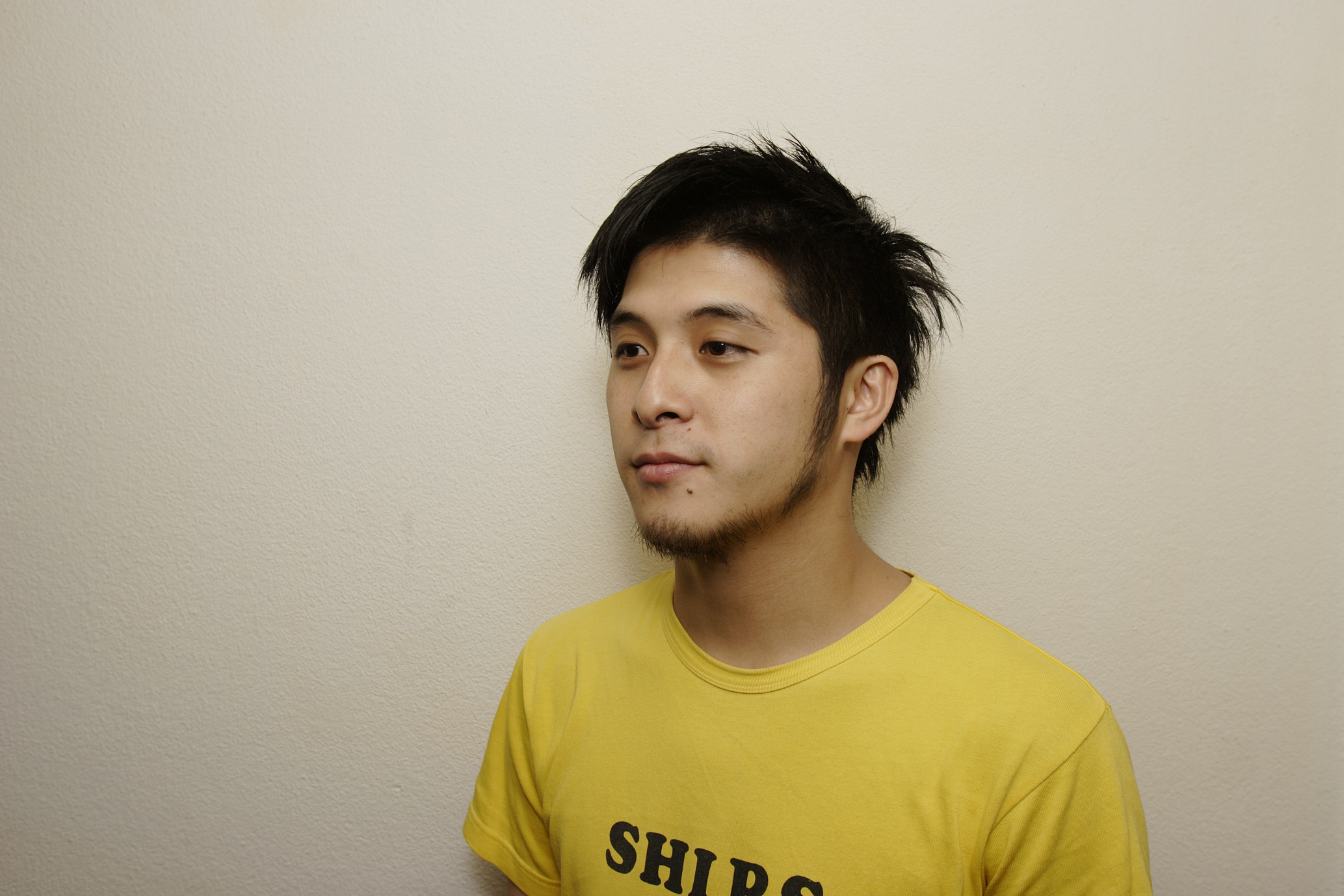
- Born: 1978 (age 47–48); Kumamoto, Japan
- Education: Waseda University
- Known for: social practice art
- Notable work: Zero Yen Project

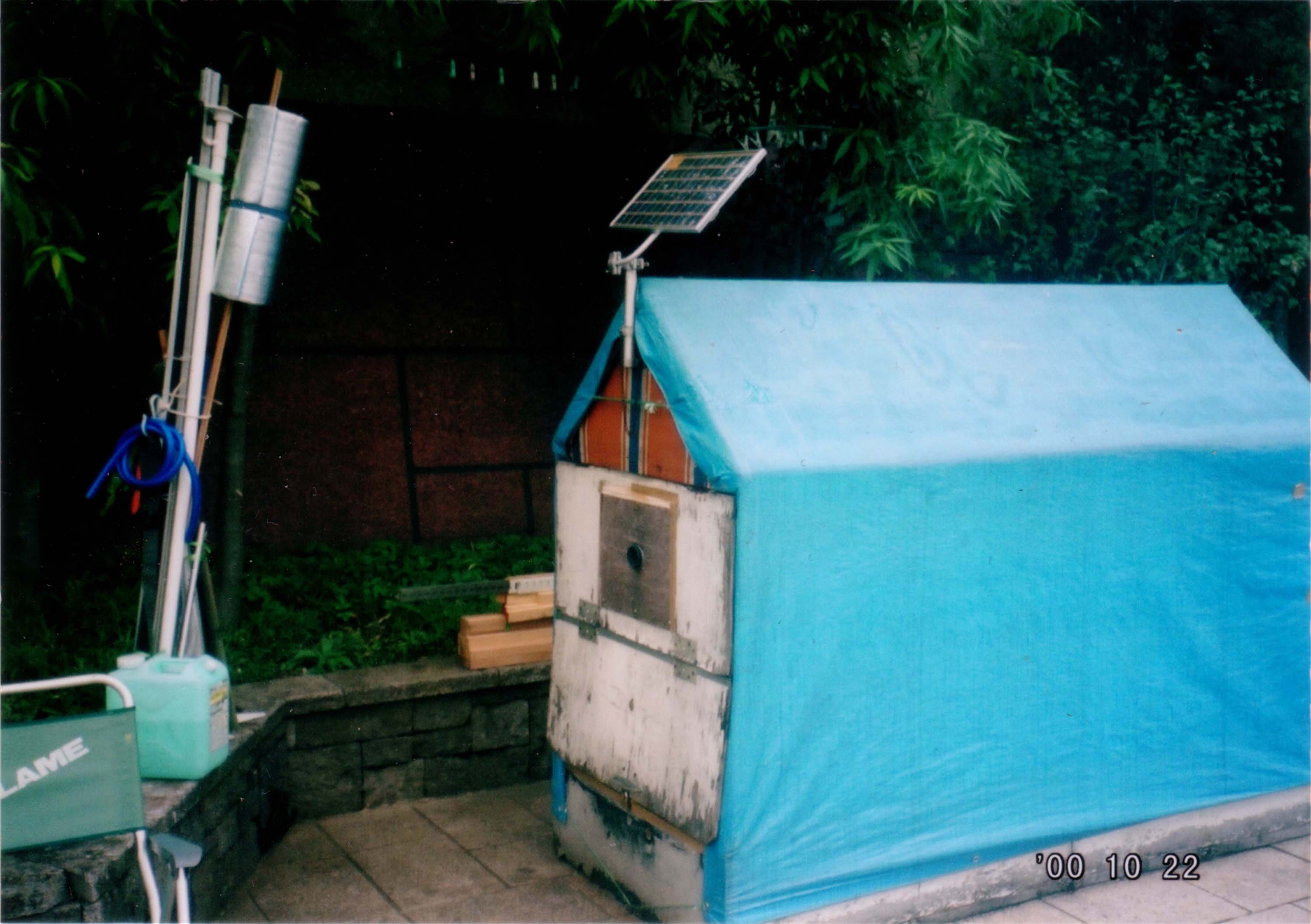
Solar Zero Yen house

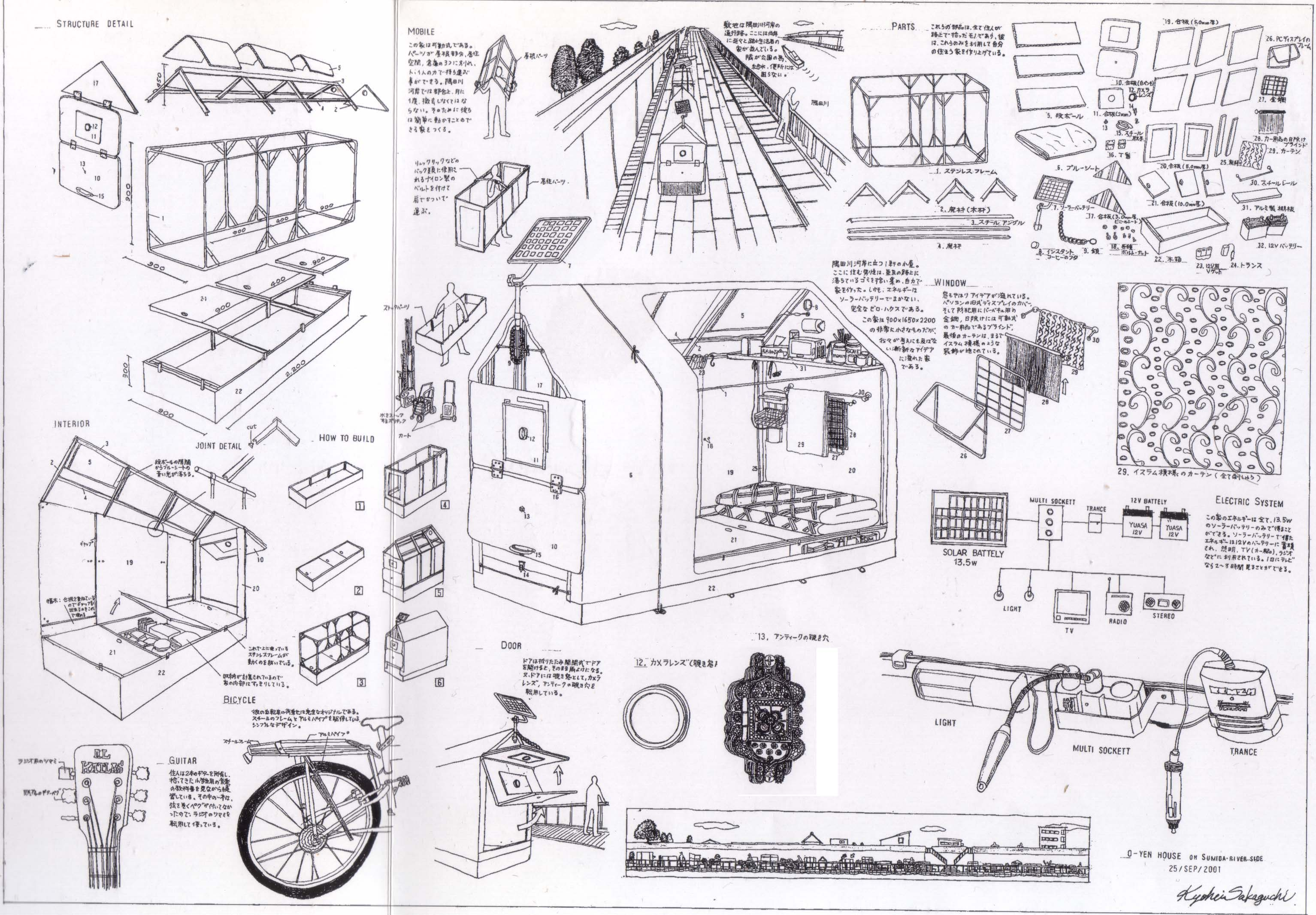
Solar zero yen house drawing

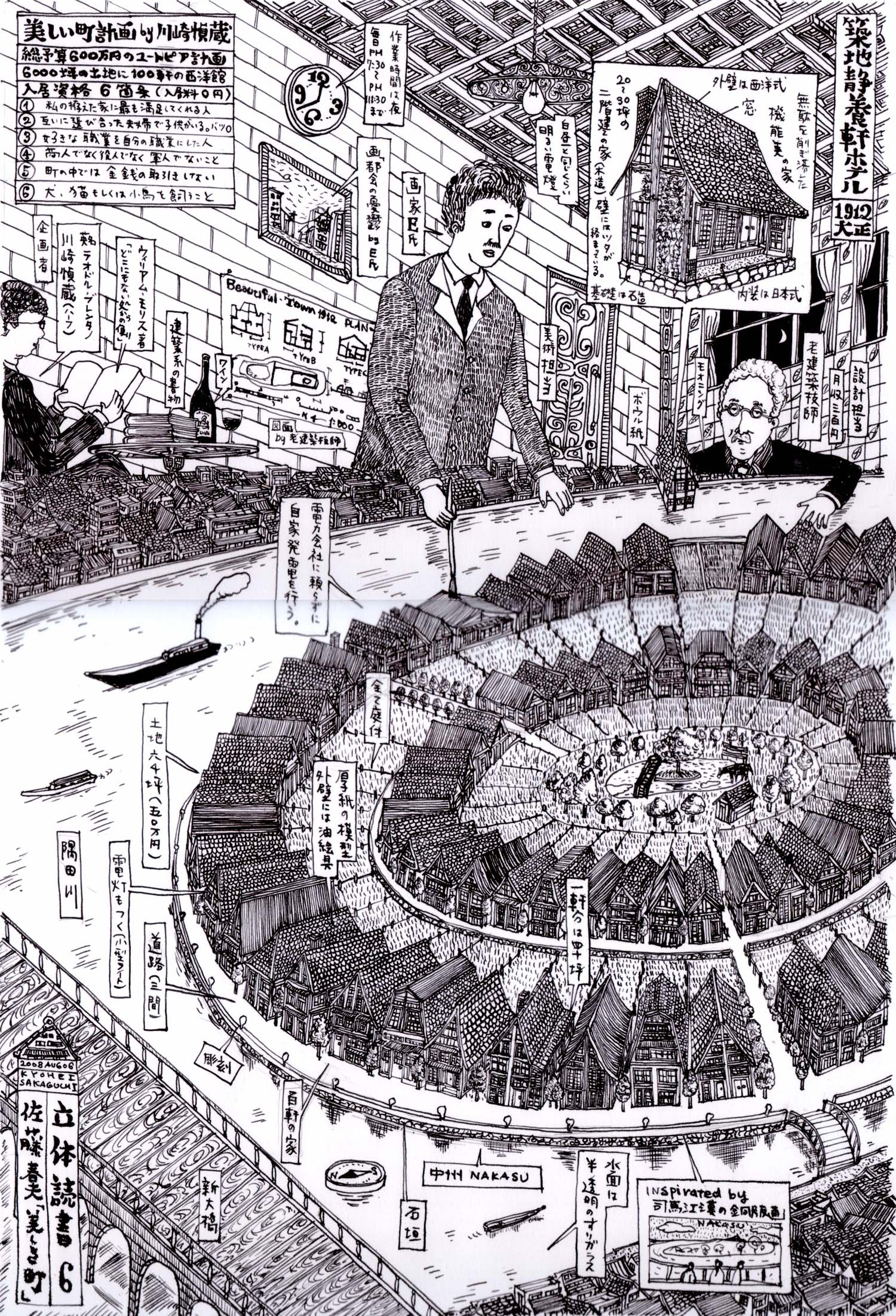
'Beautiful town'

Kyohei Sakaguchi (坂口 恭平, Sakaguchi Kyōhei; born 13 April 1978) is a Japanese artist and architect who was born in Kumamoto. He graduated from Waseda University's department of architecture in 2001. He is most known for his Zero Yen Project, which involves studying structures built at no cost, such as shanties made by the homeless.

The Zero Yen Project involved building dwellings after the Fukushima Daiichi nuclear power plant meltdowns following the March 2011 earthquake, and subsequent tsunami that devastated the Tohuku region. In response to the disaster, he created a suicide help line using his personal cell phone. Later he studied provisional dwellings made from scrap wood, discarded cardboard boxes and other scavenged materials. In 2004 is photographic book Zero Yen House was published.

In 2013 his book, Build Your Own Independent Nation, was published. In 2014, he wrote a novel, Genjitsu Dasshutsuron (Thesis on Escaping Reality). In 2020 his book Kurushii Toki wa Denwa Shite (Call Me When You're in Pain) was published.

Sakaguchi's work has been exhibited at the Watari Museum of Contemporary Art, the Trax Gallery in Yamanashi Prefecture, the Vancouver Art Gallery, as well as exhibitions in Nairobi, Berkeley, California, Philadelphia, Tokyo, the Walter Phillips Gallery at Banff Centre, Canada, Museo Desafinado / Casa Endeble in Mexico City, among other international venues

== See also ==
- Zero Yen House
