= Berwick Film & Media Arts Festival =

English film festival

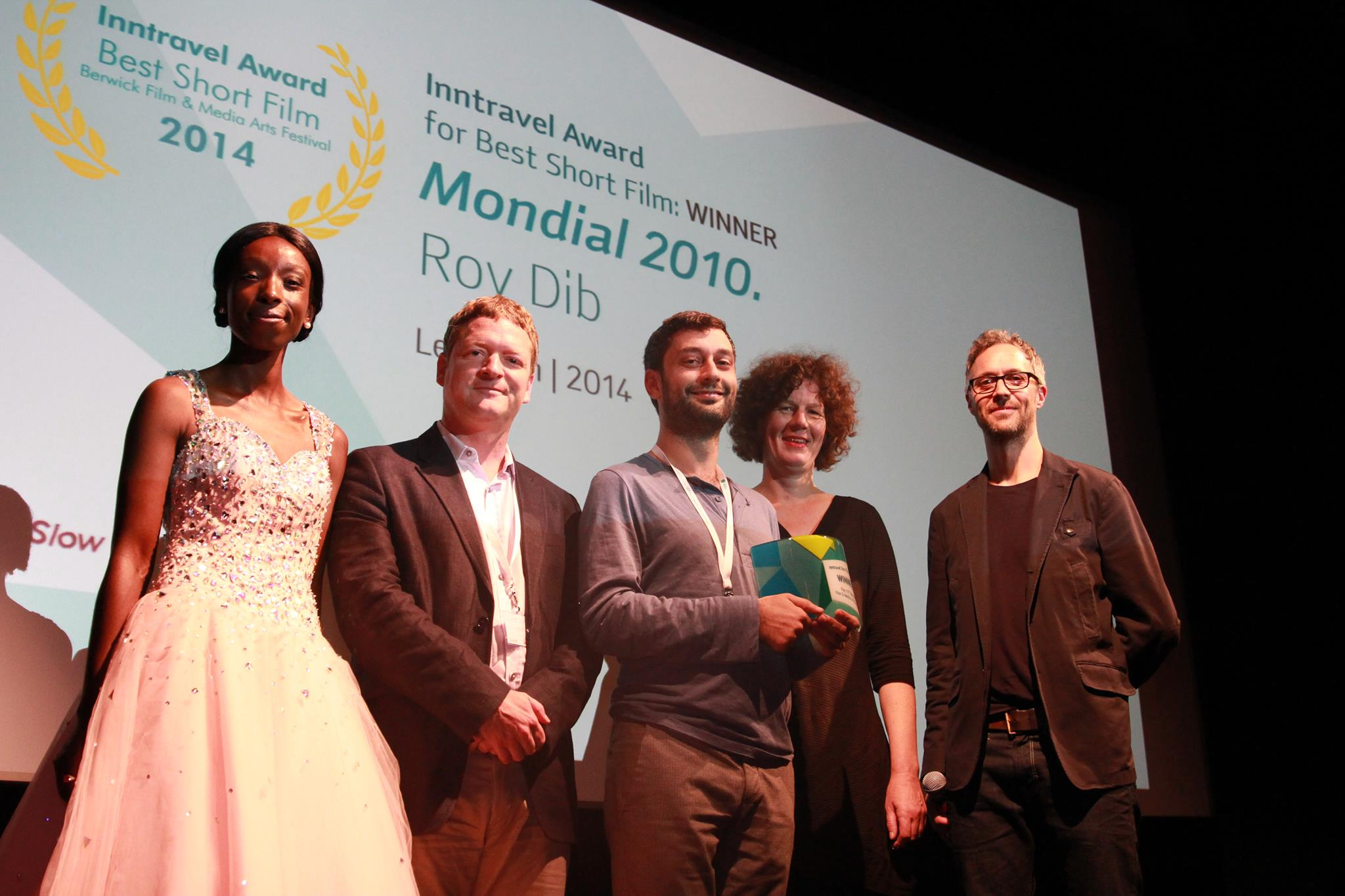
Inntravel Short Film Award presented at the 2014 Berwick Film & Media Arts Festival

Berwick Film & Media Arts Festival (BFMAF) is an annual festival with a focus on new cinema and artists' moving image. The festival programme takes place across Berwick-upon-Tweed in the North East of England, UK and includes exhibitions, film screenings, live events, school screenings and family activities.

The festival was established in 2005 by its current Chairman Professor Huw Davies and artist Marcus Coates. Peter Taylor has been Festival Director since January 2015. As an Arts Council England National Portfolio organisation, BFMAF receives regular funding from Arts Council England.

== BFMAF 2025 ==
The 20th edition of the Festival is scheduled to take place in Berwick 27-30 March 2025.

== BFMAF 2024 ==
The 19th edition of the Festival took place in Berwick 7-10 March 2024. Films shown included Malqueridas, Bedwin Hacker, The Human Surge, A Stolen Meeting, barrunto, Ouroboros, Dreaming and Dying, The Buriti Flower, Mamántula, Isabelle Stengers: Building Hope on the Edge of the Abyss, All That You Could Be, and Reality or Not.

== BFMAF 2023 ==
The 18th edition of the Festival took place in Berwick 3-5 March 2023. Locations included the Maltings Main House, Maltings Henry Travers, and the Magdalene Fields Golf Club. The programme included Nedarma, Let Us Flow, Anerca: Breath of Life, The Pleasures of Unbelonging, The Blue Mammy, Hello Dankness, Wolf and Dog, Home Invasion, Being in a Place, Maputo Nakuzandza, Care, Arnold is a Model Student, Paradiso, and tempo.

== BFMAF 2021 ==
The 17th edition of the Festival took place in Berwick and online 10–30 September 2021.

== BFMAF 2020 ==
The 16th edition of the Festival took place online from Thursday 17 September – Sunday 11 October 2020.

BFMAF 2020 featured a new online platform where artists and filmmakers’ work were expanded through conversation, new writing and podcasts over three weeks. Audiences throughout the UK and filmmakers and arts professionals from across the globe were invited to share in a Festival programme that embodied a pluralist and accessible cinema.

Access to the Festival was on a pay what you can basis in the UK with professional accreditation available worldwide.

== BFMAF 2019 ==
The 15th Berwick Film & Media Arts Festival took place 19–22 September 2019.

The programme included the Berwick New Cinema Competition that screened 23 works by a total of 27 artists across five screening programmes. The winning film the names have changed, including my own and truths have been altered by Onyeka Igwe was selected by the competition jurors Callum Hill (winner of the 2018 Berwick New Cinema Award); Hyun Jin Cho (film curator, Korean Cultural Centre UK); and Julian Ross (programmer, Locarno Film Festival & International Film Festival Rotterdam).

The Berwick New Cinema strand featured UK premieres from Lav Diaz, Narimane Mari and Angela Schanelec. BFMAF 2019 presented Essential Cinema, a retrospective series that screened fresh looks at classic works and overlooked masterpieces from Marilou Diaz-Abaya, Christian Ghazi, Lionel Soukaz and Djibril Diop Mambéty.

Alongside the cinema programmes, BFMAF 2019 also featured 12 exhibitions that repopulated Berwick's town walls, historic buildings and town centre. This included a screening of Cinématon – one of the world's longest films (at over 200 hours) across five disused and empty shop fronts around the high street.

BFMAF's 2019 exhibition programme included Animistic Apparatus, a curatorial project initiated by May Adadol Ingawanij with Julian Ross which drew on inspirations from Southeast Asia, exhibiting Camera Trap by Chris Chong Chan Fui and Fireworks (Archives) by Apichatpong Weerasethakul.

Alongside Lav Diaz’s UK Premiere of The Halt, which included an introduction from the filmmaker, Animistic Apparatus presented an overnight outdoors screening of Diaz's 485-minute film A Lullaby to the Sorrowful Mystery.

The 2019 BFMAF Artist in Profile Marwa Arsanios presented her moving image work in two screenings and led a seminar that examined the different stages of creating a work, from research to writing, through performance and film.

The Fantastika film series considered the many ways filmmakers have utilised fairytales, folktales and fables in their work over the past sixty years. Curated by BFMAF Associate Programmer Herb Shellenberger, the series was in international in scope, with films from Colombia, Georgia, Niger, Yugoslavia and more. Elena Gorfinkel (King's College, London) curated the Kira Muratova retrospective, the critically acclaimed titan of Russian language cinema.

The Propositions strand included a presentation of Aura Satz's work, curator Steffanie Ling presented a survey of the 16mm films of Canadian artist and Berwick New Cinema Award winner Julia Feyrer, Holly Argent's lecture-performance and Rabz Lansiquot presented a dialogue between the works of Black British artists Zinzi Minott and Judah Attille.

In 2019, BFMAF also presented a month-long, multi-part exhibition Double Ghosts that featured the work of George Clark in The Gymnasium Gallery. Exploring the status and potential of unrealised and fragmented histories, the exhibition drew together 35mm film, sound recordings, script fragments, photography and archival material filmed and gathered in Chile, France and Taiwan.

== BFMAF 2018 ==
The 14th Berwick Film & Media Arts Festival took place 20–23 September 2018. It featured the third edition of the Berwick New Cinema Competition which featured 14 films, all made after 1 January 2017. It included the first major UK retrospective of filmmakers Shireen Seno and John Torres, whose studio, film laboratory, library and platform Los Otros is based in Manila, Philippines. A new programme strand 'Propositions' gave four filmmakers, Jessica Sarah Rinland, Sky Hopinka, Morgan Quaintance and Giles Bailey an opportunity to develop an expanded presentation of their work.

Another programme strand at the 2018 festival was 'Screening the Forest' curated by Dr Graiwoot Chulphongsathorn: a series that took nature as its point of departure and presented films from Japan, Myanmar, South Korea, Taiwan, Thailand, Vietnam and the Philippines.

The BFMAF 2018 Artist in Profile was Sophia Al-Maria who presented a screening of her films in the cinema programme alongside an exhibition of her film The Magical State at the Magazine venue.

BFMAF 2018 also presented Essential Cinema, a retrospective series that took a fresh look at classic works of cinema and overlooked masterpieces. It featured the first screening in 40 years of Tales of the Dumpster Kid by Edgar Reitz & Ula Stöckl, Lips of Blood by Jean Rollin, Some Interviews on Personal Matters by Lana Gogoberidze, the African cinema classic Hyenas by Djibril Diop Mambéty and TERROR NULLIUS by artistic duo Soda_ Jerk.

Alongside the Cinema programmes BFMAF 2018 also featured 11 exhibitions situated in Berwick in various historic and former commercial buildings. This included an exhibition by BFMAF and Berwick Visual Arts resident, Lucy Clout, entitled Solvent Magazine at the Gymnasium Gallery.

The opening film of BFMAF 2018 was Empty Metal by Adam Khalil & Bayley Sweitzer. The festival closed to the joint UK premiere of Shireen Seno's Nervous Translation.

== BFMAF 2017 ==
The 13th Berwick Film & Media Arts Festival took place 20–24 September 2017.

The Festival featured artists’ work commissioned for Berwick, exhibitions in non-gallery spaces, brand new cinema, special programmes and retrospectives, in-depth talks with Festival artists, and activities for families and young people.

Cinema screenings included the first ever UK retrospective of Uzbek master Ali Khamraev plus the Berwick New Cinema Competition, with every film a UK, European, International or World premiere.

Another focal point for BFMAF 2017 was Ultramarine: The Sea as Political Space, a dynamic selection of films that reimagined our complex relationship with the sea. Margaret Salmon's new commission Mm celebrating the 50th season of the Berwick Bandits and with a soundtrack from Sacred Paws.

== BFMAF 2016: X ==
In 2016 BFMAF hosted Thomas Beard's retrospective, An Early Clue to the New Direction: Queer Cinema Before Stonewall. All the films in this programme strand were screened from 35mm/16mm prints.

The Berwick New Cinema programme featured UK Premieres of El futuro perfecto by Nele Wohlatz, Maud Alpi's Gorge cœur ventre; and If It Was, by Laure Prouvost. World premieres of several films were also presented, including Molly Palmer's Some Shapes Without Edges, Jenny Perlin's Tender Not Approved and Sophie Michael's The Watershow Extravaganza, which also featured as an exhibition.

BFMAF's 2016 exhibition programme included works by Artists in Profile Claire Hooper and Deborah Stratman, alongside Festival commission Persuasion by Lucy Parker. Also included were new works by Ghislaine Leung, Jenny Brady and CIRCA Projects, who presented their live event, World Is Sudden: Part I.

== Berwick New Cinema Award 2016 – present ==
BFMAF hosts the Berwick New Cinema Competition, an annual prize awarded each year to a film in the Competition programme strand of the festival.

The 2019 Berwick New Cinema Award winner was Onyeka Igwe for her film the names have changed, including my own and truths have been altered.

The 2019 jury were Callum Hill (winner of the 2018 Berwick New Cinema Award); Hyun Jin Cho (film curator, Korean Cultural Centre UK); and Julian Ross (programmer, Locarno Film Festival & International Film Festival Rotterdam).

The 2018 Berwick New Cinema Award was given to Callum Hill for her film Crowtrap, one of 14 films featured in the 2018 competition programme.

The Berwick New Cinema Award was designed by Glasgow-based ceramicist Mariella Verkerk and included a £1000 award supported by Outset Scotland

The 2018 jury were 2017 Berwick New Cinema Award winner Sky Hopinka, film producer and distributor Sonali Joshi and artist-filmmaker Gail Pickering.

Previous winners include Sky Hopinka (Dislocation Blues 2017) and Camilo Restrepo (Cilaos, 2016).

== BFMAF 2015: Fact or Fiction ==
In 2015, BFMAF appointed a new director, Peter Taylor, following the departure of its long-serving director Melanie Iredale to join Sheffield Doc/Fest as Deputy Director. Taylor took up post in January with the remit to deliver the 11th edition of the festival, themed 'Fact or Fiction'.

BFMAF 2015: Fact or Fiction turned a curious eye to the grey areas between fact and fantasy, documentary and narrative, journalism and propaganda.

The programme featured an expanded roster of moving image installations and screenings. From Moshen Makhmalbaf's Iranian masterpiece Salam Cinema on 35mm to Giff-Gaff, a commissioned series of live events curated by CIRCA Projects.

Artists in profile were Deimantas Narkevičius who presented Once in the XX Century - an exhibition of the artist's oeuvre to date and Seamus Harahan, who presented his newly commissioned ‘Fucking Finland’. A series of films that explored cultural chinks, links and aberrations on the periphery of Europe.

== BFMAF 2014: Border Crossing ==
In 2014, the festival presented its 10th edition informed by the theme 'Border Crossing' (echoing the theme of the inaugural 2005 festival), the dates of the festival were specifically chosen to coincide with the Scottish independence referendum and its theme explored the concept of borders, "setting out to cross and transcend borders in all directions, exploring border identities all over the world." For the first time this year, the festival secured a major corporate sponsor, global strategic outsourcing firm, Mitie.

In the same year, the festival won two awards for its successes in the region. In March 2014 the festival was awarded Best Community Event of the Year by the North East Press and in April, Best Event Northumberland by The Journal Culture Awards.

Opening Film: Mamarosh (2013) by Momcilo Mrdakovic.

== Berwick Artists' Moving Image Residency 2013 – present ==
Organised in collaboration with Berwick Visual Arts, the annual residency is an opportunity for an artist with a moving-image-based practice to create new work over a 6-month period in Berwick-upon-Tweed, which is then premiered at the Festival.

2018 Residency In April 2018 Lucy Clout was announced as the 2018 artist in residence. She presented a new body of work titled Solvent Magazine at BFMAF 2018 which included sculptural and video pieces made during her six-month residency with BFMAF and Berwick Visual Arts.

A new film of the same title brought together research about the close readings of bodies. The work uses pleasure and ambiguity as tools to think about the contemporary production of knowledge, evidence and queer reproduction.

2017 Residency In April 2017 Charlotte Prodger was appointed artist in residence, with a proposal to "explore the complex intertwining of landspace, time and identity within the rural context of Northumberland". Prodger works with moving image, sound, sculpture, writing and performance, mining the intertextual relationships between each of these materials.

2016 Residency In May 2016 artist Lucy Parker was selected as artist in residence. Parker's research-led practice adopts collaborative filmmaking methods when making work with a community. During her residency Parker explored the theme of 'X' in two ways: "as the axis on the graph that measures change and as in the X file: a file given minimal-priority status and concerned with unexplained phenomena".

2015 Residency The 2015 residency was undertaken by sound and video artist Paul Rooney. who created a new film, premiered at the Berwick Film and Media Arts Festival that responded to the theme 'Fact or Fiction'.

2014 Residency Video artist Katie Davies became the partnership's second artist in residence. From March 2014 to September 2014, the artist lived and practised in Berwick. Her film, 'The Lawes of the Marches' responded to the festival theme 'Border Crossing' and was premiered at the festival in September 2014.

2013 Residency Cecilia Stenbom was the first artist to be awarded the artist in residency opportunity. During her residency period (March 2013 – September 2013) she created 'The Case', a moving-image piece which premiered at the 9th Berwick Film & Media Arts Festival and responded to the theme 'North by Northeast.'

== Inntravel Short Film Awards: 2013 – 2015 ==
From 2013 to 2015 the festival's short film award was supported by the independent travel company Inntravel. The award showcased and celebrated short form work being created across the UK and internationally, and was judged by a panel of industry figures and experts. Previous winners of the prize were: Mondial 2010 by Roy Dib from Lebanon (2014) and Premature by Gunhild Enger from Norway (2013).

Canadian artists Julia Feyrer and Tamara Henderson were the 2015 recipients of BFMAF's Inntravel Short Film Award for Consider the Belvedere.

== BFMAF 2013: North by Northeast ==
In 2013, the festival's 9th edition, themed 'North by Northeast' used its programme to explore North East England and Scotland's connections to Northern Europe and to the North Sea.

Opening Film: The Hidden Child (2013) by Per Hanefjord.

== BFMAF 2012: Pictures in Motion ==
In 2012, the festival reverted to a run of five consecutive days and took the theme 'Pictures in Motion' to examine the relationship between the still and moving image, attempting to raise questions about the nature of both in a digital world.

Opening Film: Chasing Ice (2012) by Jeff Orlowski.

== BFMAF 2011: Once Upon a Time ==
In 2011, the three-day 7th edition of the festival, 'Once Upon a Time', explored the enchantment of fairy tales on film, from one of the first examples of the genre, Alice in Wonderland (1903) through to the modern day.

Opening Film: I Am Nasrine (2011) by Tina Gharavi.

== BFMAF 2010: Stagings ==
In 2010, the 6th edition of the festival ran over five days and explored the theme 'Stagings', looking at the role of the screen as a stage and featuring, dance on film, music documentary, old classics and live performances.

Opening Film: The Keystone Cut Ups (2010) by People Like Us and Ergo Phizmiz.

== BFMAF 2009: Drawing the Lines ==
In 2009, the 5th edition of the festival looked towards the representation of architecture and space on screen with 'Drawing the Lines'.

Opening Film: Ballast (2008) by Lance Hammer.

== BFMAF 2008: Inner States ==
The 2008 festival was produced in collaboration with Northumberland Lights and as such explored the theme 'Inner States' through light and sound as well as cinema.

Opening Film: The Cabinet of Dr. Caligari (1920) by Robert Wiene.

== BFMAF 2007: Film on Film ==
The 3rd edition of the festival in 2007 ran for nine days and looked at ways in which artists and filmmakers use overt and conscious self-reference in the work they create with its theme 'Film on Film'. This festival was produced in collaboration with guest curators Rebecca Shatwell (Director, AV Festival) and Iain Pate.

Opening Film: The Big Bad Swim (2006) by Ishai Setton.

== BFMAF Minifest 06 ==
Produced as a smaller event following the positive response from the 2005 inaugural festival, the 2006 Minifest was dedicated to the memory of Chris Anderson who had been an early supporter of the Festival and Chair of the 1st edition steering committee. Following his passing, his family set up the Chris Anderson Award to promote the work of young filmmakers which continues to form part of the festival programme today.

Opening Film: Bobby (2006) by Emilio Estevez.

== BFMAF 2005: Crossing Borders ==
The very first Berwick Film & Media Arts Festival was themed 'Crossing Borders', it reflected Berwick-upon-Tweed's position as a border town, with the history and isolation that comes with a place falling between countries.

Opening Film: Jiminy Glick in Lalawood (2004) by Vadim Jean.
