= Walter Phillips Gallery =

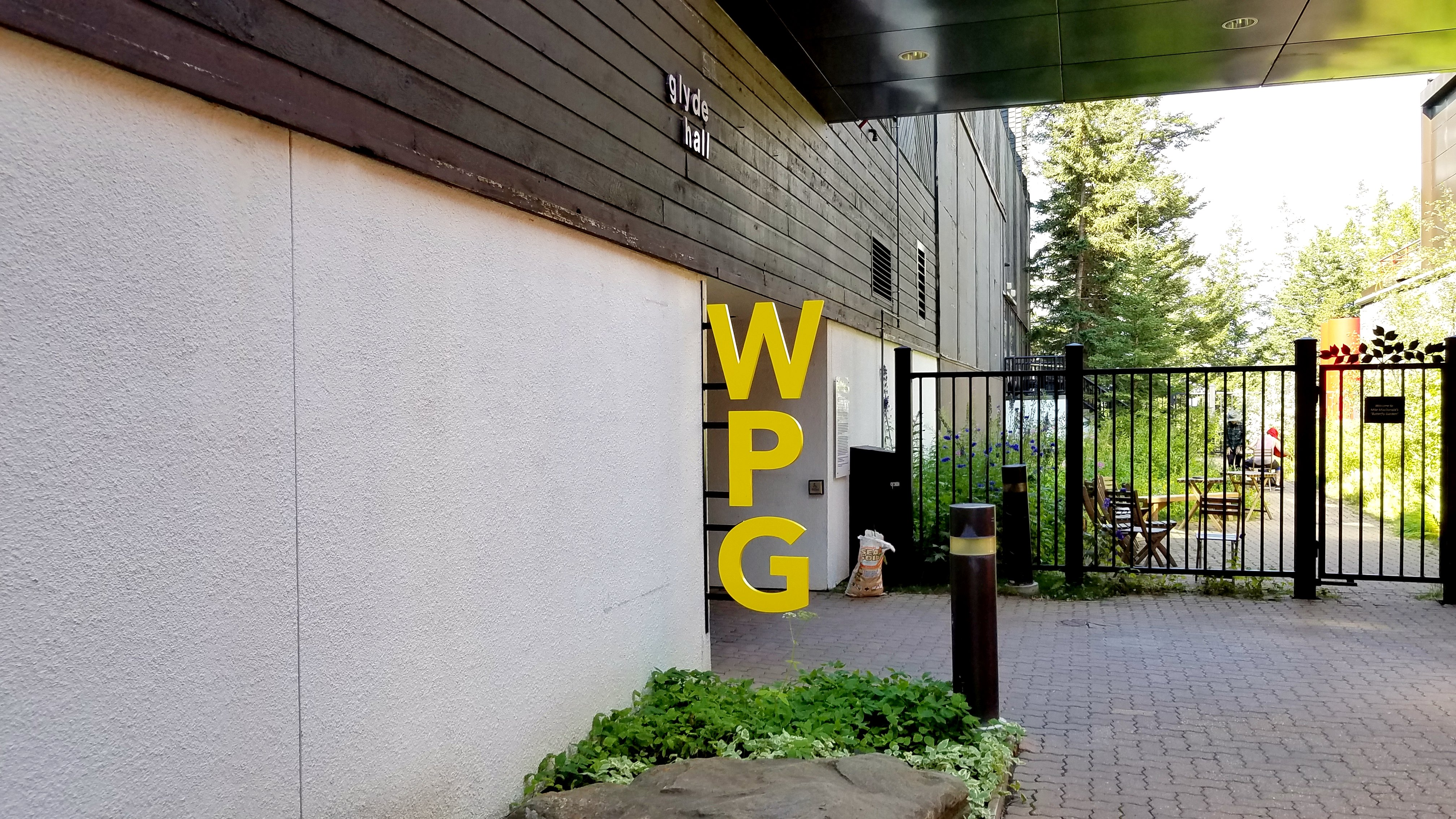
- Walter Phillips Gallery entrance
- Established: 1976; 50 years ago
- Location: 107 Tunnel Mountain Drive, Banff, Alberta, Canada
- Coordinates: 51.1717°N 115.5611°W
- Type: Art museum
- Curator: Jacqueline Bell
- Website: www.banffcentre.ca/walter-phillips-gallery

The Walter Phillips Gallery (WPG) is a contemporary art gallery in Banff, Alberta. It was established in 1976 as a part of The Banff Centre in Banff National Park.

== History and mission ==
Walter J. Phillips was a printmaker and painter, from the 1930s to the 1950s, who played a seminal role in the development of the visual arts program in The Banff School of Fine Arts.

The Walter Phillips Gallery was formally established at Banff Centre on August 3, 1976 with the mandate to collect and exhibit Canadian and International contemporary art. After its conception, it quickly evolved into a small but dynamic gallery and became known for a contemporary art program that championed curatorial innovation with a commitment to emerging forms of art including video and performance.

For contemporary artists, particularly those engaged in alternative forms of practice, the WPG remains an essential and principal site where art is presented to an audience for critical reception. In an effort to ensure a broad and balanced representation of the different areas of research at the Centre, the Gallery exhibits and collects: painting, drawing, printmaking, sculpture, ceramics, textiles, photography and new media-based works. The Gallery's substantial collection of video art is housed in the Paul D. Fleck Library at The Banff Centre and is available for public viewing. The Walter Phillips Gallery operates under the jurisdiction of the Visual Arts Department at The Banff Centre.

The Gallery's publication program presents new ideas for understanding the social, historical, political and aesthetic realms in which many of today's artworks exist. Most of these publications are published as Walter Phillips Gallery Editions by The Banff Centre Press. Recent publications include: Frances Stark: My Best Thing, essay by Mark Godfrey (2012); Anthony Burnham: Even Space Does Not Repeat, essays by Diana Nemiroff, Marie-Ève Charron, and Naomi Potter (2011); Ron Terada: Who I Think I Am, essays by Cliff Lauson, Anne Low, and Tom McDonough (2010); Silke Otto-Knapp: Present time exercise essays by Suzanne Cotter, Jan Verwoert, and Catherine Wood (2009); and The World Upside Down edited by Richard William Hill (2008).

== Recent exhibitions ==
- An Ever Changing Meaning - February 2 – April 7, 2013 - Aurélien Froment, Alexis Guillier, Louise Hervé & Chloé Maillet, and Benjamin Seror - Curated by François Aubart - An Ever Changing Meaning brings together five artists who share interest in the way historical facts, records, and anecdotes can be reshaped in a variety of contexts. Works in video, sculpture, and performance reconsider a broad range of references, from histories of the moving image, science and architecture. Borrowing the tools of the historian or the authority of the expert, the artists have the potential to willfully act as undisciplined practitioners within and across multiple disciplines.
- Modest Livelihood - August 3 – November 18, 2012 - Brian Jungen and Duane Linklater - Presented in collaboration with dOCUMENTA (13), the film Modest Livelihood (2012) enacts self-determination and the use of native land as its central concerns. Jungen, DaneZaa, is recognized internationally primarily as a sculptor; while Linklater, Omaskêko Cree, works with moving image and performance.
- BigBoxGreenScreenRefrigeratorActions - April 28 – July 15, 2012 - Mark Leckey - For his first solo exhibition at a public gallery in Western Canada, UK-based artist and Turner Prize winner Mark Leckey presents two recent works: GreenScreenRefrigeratorAction (2010) and BigBoxNaturalAction (2012). Leckey's multi-disciplinary practice includes sculpture, performance, print-making, sound, and moving image.
- Kill The Workers! - January 21 – April 8, 2012 - Janice Kerbel - Janice Kerbel's recent work Kill the Workers! continues the London-based artist's engagement with codified language and the elements of theatrical composition. A rigged system of theatrical lights is used to portray the ambitions of a lone spotlight attempting to achieve a state of "open white." Dramaturgy and narrative progression are alluded to through changes in beam intensity, colour, pattern and direction. With these cues, the lights become both the characters and mechanics of the composition, sharing the roles of staging and performing.
- My Best Thing - September 24 – December 11, 2011 - Frances Stark - Frances Stark's highly compelling animated video My Best Thing premiered at this year's Venice Biennale to widespread critical acclaim. Using free text-to-speech online animation software, Stark employs Playmobil-like avatars to chronicle the dialogic episodes of random video chat that are at once philosophical and absurdly funny. The story of these virtual encounters examines the shared space of sexual attraction, the creative process, and technological mediation.
- The Serving Library - July 10 – September 4, 2011 - Dexter Sinister - This summer, Walter Phillips Gallery at The Banff Centre will present the most fully realized version of The Serving Library by Dexter Sinister (David Reinfurt and Stuart Bailey). In this incarnation of the project, the travelling Library, a specific set of books and a collection of corollary artifacts, will serve as the focal point for the residency program From the Toolbox of a Serving Library, in which the books and artifacts will be put to use, specifically towards a reconsideration of the Bauhaus foundation course.
- A Journey That Wasn't - April 16 – June 19, 2011 - Pierre Huyghe - In the video installation A Journey That Wasn't, internationally renowned French artist Pierre Huyghe transports viewers from his Antarctic expedition to an elaborate re-enactment of that voyage in Central Park, New York, as he searches for an elusive albino creature rumoured to live on an uncharted polar island. Part nature documentary, part sci-fi movie, and part musical, the film shifts between scenes of breathtaking wilderness and those of the orchestrated spectacle, leaving it up to us to decide what to believe.
- Even Space Does Not Repeat - January 15 – March 27, 2011 - Anthony Burnham - In Even Space Does Not Repeat, Anthony Burnham's first solo exhibition in Western Canada, he presents a series of new paintings that develops the artist's study of replication and authenticity. Burnham's paintings are documents of experimental sculpture and actions that he transforms, through various forms of representation, into working sketches. These final paintings represent the refined moments and precise details in a measured practice of deconstruction and construction.
- God's Dice - November 13 – December 12, 2010 - Geoffrey Farmer - God's Dice is a project by Vancouver-based artist Geoffrey Farmer that inverts the typical exhibition format by foregrounding performativity, theatricality, change, and evolution. Reconsidering the supposed neutrality of the gallery space where construction, creative decision, and artistic and curatorial labour are all but invisible, Farmer brings to light an evolving process of creation and experimentation.
- Popular Unrest] - August 14 – October 24, 2010 - Melanie Gilligan - Walter Phillips Gallery presents the North American premiere of London-based artist Melanie Gilligan's newest film project Popular Unrest. A multi-part fictional narrative, Popular Unrest questions the political subjectivity today within the transforming political landscape resulting from the global economic crisis. Rather than take a documentary approach to its subject matter, the film presents surreal, satirical, and disturbing narratives based on the state of politics and the public realm.
- Who I Think I Am] - May 15 – July 25, 2010 - Ron Terada - Inspired by the memoirs of troubled American painter and conceptual artist Jack Goldstein, Ron Terada's new language-based paintings Jack (2010) narrate a chapter in the life of Goldstein, who met with an untimely death in 2003. Terada's appropriation continues in Soundtrack for an Exhibition (2010), the latest in an ongoing series of homemade playlists, in this case made especially to accompany the Walter Phillips Gallery presentation. Both are a foil for the Vancouver-based artist's exploration of contemporary artistic practice and identity.
- The End] - January 30 – April 18, 2010 - Ragnar Kjartansson - Shot in the Rocky Mountains, The End, a highly compelling video installation, depicts two musicians - artist Ragnar Kjartansson and his collaborator Davíð Þór Jónsson - playing folk/country meets experimental music in a frigid, lonely place. Both characters are dressed as northern, Davy Crockett-type frontiersmen, an extreme example of a stereotype that persists and contributes to the countless fictions projected upon the western landscape.

== Affiliations ==
The Museum is affiliated with the Canadian Museums Association, Canadian Heritage Information Network, and Virtual Museum of Canada.

== See also ==
- List of art museums
- List of museums in Alberta
