= Derya Akay =

Turkish artist

- Born: 1988 (age 37–38); Istanbul, Turkey
- Education: Emily Carr University of Art and Design (BFA)
- Occupation: Visual artist
- Known for: Installation art, performance art
- Website: deryaakay.com

Derya Akay (born 1988) is a Turkish artist based in Vancouver, Canada. Akay has held numerous solo and group exhibitions in Canada, Japan, Mexico, U.S., and Turkey. In 2010, Akay graduated from Emily Carr University of Art and Design and completed a residency at the Banff Centre.

== Work ==
Akay's artistic practice involves community organizing, gathering, cooking, food and knowledge sharing, gardening, performance, and installation. Akay often uses tableware, textiles, food, and organic material in installations and performances with a focus on feminized and collective labour, while using intimate and domestic spaces such as kitchens, gardens, and bedrooms to showcase his work.

Akay's mother, Dilara Akay, is an activist and artist. They collaborated on Ghost Spring (2018), a work about the political upheavals in Turkey and the loss of loved ones, installed and performed at Mountain View Cemetery in Vancouver, Canada, in association with grunt gallery.

== Exhibitions and projects ==
Akay has collaborated with artists such as Haruko Okano, T’uy’t’tanat Cease Wyss, Julia Feyrer, and Anne Low.

- Queer Dowry (2022), What Water Knows, The Land Remembers, Toronto Biennial of Art
- Looking at the Garden Fence (2021), with Vivienne Bessette and Garden Don't Care artist collective at Sahalli Park Community Garden, Elisabeth Rogers Community Garden, Harmony Garden X̱wemelch’stn pen̓em̓áy
- Meydan (2021), Polygon Gallery
- The Neighbours Plate (2020), with Dana Qaddah and Amna Elnour, Unit 17
- Green Grocer (2018), Unit 17
- with bread (2017), Campbell River Art Gallery
- Punice (2017), Del Vaz Projects
- Vancouver Special: Ambivalent Pleasures (2016), Vancouver Art Gallery
