= Haruko Okano =

Canadian artist

- Born: March 26, 1945 (age 81); Toronto, Ontario, Canada
- Known for: performance, mixed media, installation, painting, community-based practice
- Awards: VIVA Award
- Website: http://www.harukookano.com/

Haruko Okano (born March 26, 1945) is a process-based, collaborative, multidisciplinary, mixed-media artist, poet, community organizer, and activist based in Vancouver, British Columbia.

== Life ==
Haruko Okano was born in Toronto, Ontario. She is a 'Sansei' (third-generation) Japanese Canadian. Her Japanese grandfather came to live in Haney, British Columbia, in 1918.

Okano was born at a tumultuous time in her parents' relationship. Okano's parents argued over her custody and she was intermittently placed in foster care. Her mother died when she was nine years old. After her mother's death, Okano became a permanent ward of the Children's Aid Society and she lived in a series of foster homes, where she experienced psychological and sexual abuse and was removed from all contact with her Japanese cultural heritage. Okano locates the origin of her alienation from her identity as a Japanese Canadian during this period of displacement. Her career as an artist, writer, and community activist has often focused on the recovery and expression of her cultural identity.

Okano studied art at Central Technical School in Toronto, where she graduated with honours in 1972. She went on to study print production at Vancouver Community College in 1980.

Since 1993, Okano has lived in the China Creek Housing Co-op in the Mount Pleasant neighbourhood of Vancouver. In 2013, she spoke out in the media against plans to shut down the Federal Co-operative Housing Program, which subsidizes a portion of rent for thousands of co-op residents in British Columbia like her.

== Artistic practice ==
An artist, writer, and activist, Okano works in various media, including painting, sculpture, site-specific installation, performance, mixed media, and text. She often incorporates found materials and natural detritus in her work, such as stones, living spores and fungus, leaves, and branches. She explores environmental and ecological themes, as well as race, sexuality, and gender.

A recurrent theme for Okano is that of cultural and linguistic hybridity. Literary critic Eva Darias-Beautell has observed that "Okano's disconcerting writing and artwork have invariably revolved around the unresolved condition of cultural hybridity, often betraying the traps as well as the possibilities of the search for modes of expression that fall outside normativity. Her production […] thematizes and speaks to the theoretical debates that surround the condition of the diasporic subject in Canada."

Okano is known for her collaborative, community-based practice, in which her role is that of an artistic facilitator for projects realized in the public realm and with stakeholders and participants outside of the typical confines of the art world.

Okano collaborated with Derya Akay and Vivienne Bessette on the project Looking at the Garden Fence (2021), which took place at numerous community gardens at Sahalli Park Community Garden, Elisabeth Rogers Community Garden, and Harmony Garden X̱wemelch'stn pen̓em̓áy.

In 2021, alongside artist Azul Duque, Okano participated in a four-month residency as part of the Gabriola Arts Council's Kasahara Gabriola Trust Artist Residency program, which takes place on Gabriola Island.

=== Select works ===
==== Mount Pleasant Community Fence, 1994 ====
In 1994, Okano and fellow artists Merle Addison and Pat Beaton from the artist-run grunt gallery initiated a project on East 8th Avenue and Fraser Street in Vancouver’s Mount Pleasant area, in which members from the community designed and hand-carved four hundred red-cedar pickets to be used for a local fence.

John Steil and Aileen Stalker note that through community involvement, the "fence in this case is not a barrier, but the demarcation of the garden, the result of many people from culturally different backgrounds working together to beautify and green their neighbourhood, contribute to a sustainable community and lessen the stress of city life."

==== High(~~bridi~~) Tea, 1998–2001 ====
A collaboration with poet Fred Wah, High(~~bridi~~) Tea was a performance that took place at the Nice Café in Vancouver's Mount Pleasant neighbourhood on November 17, 2000. The work was conceived and developed at Banff Centre for the Arts in 1998 by Wah and Okano. Both artists were in residence at Banff at the same time, working on separate projects about hybridized languages. They learned they shared an interest in issues around contamination, cultural hybridity, and race. Okano and Wah started a two-year collaboration on the piece, which included performance, installation, poetry, and environmental art. For the performance, Okano and Wah acted as serving staff, bringing white bread and tea to twenty-six guests who drank from china teacups and who used paper napkins that were covered in kombucha fungus and printed with text, such as "dis-orient" and "disgust." Words such as "corrupt" and "apartheid" had been silkscreened in mould onto the bread. Throughout the performance, Okano and Wah shared recollections of growing up in Canada as cultural and racial hybrids.

==== San Augustine Suite, 2009 ====
While completing an artist residency in San Augustine, Mexico, Okano walked the same road every day to and from her studio, and collected materials along the route (including seed pods, flowers, and grasses, as well as bits of trash). She combined the scavenged materials into a series of mixed-media sculptures that serve as records of her location and daily perambulations.

=== Select collections ===
Okano's works are held in a number of private and public collections, including the Canada Council Art Bank, the Japanese Canadian Citizens Association, the Library of Congress, the Province of British Columbia, and the Surrey Art Gallery.

=== Awards ===
Okano received the VIVA Award from the Jack and Doris Shadbolt Foundation in 2000.
