= Catriona Jeffries Gallery =

Catriona Jeffries
- Established: 1994
- Location: 950 East Cordova Street; Vancouver, British Columbia, Canada; V6A 1M6
- Coordinates: 49.2685633°N 123.098144°W
- Type: Art gallery
- Directors: Catriona Jeffries and Peter Gazendam
- Owner: Catriona Jeffries
- Website: catrionajeffries.com

Catriona Jeffries is an art gallery in Vancouver, British Columbia, that has been in operation since 1994. It focuses on the post conceptual art practices which have emerged from Vancouver and the critical relationships between these practices and particular international artists. It is recognized as one of the most important commercial contemporary art galleries in Vancouver, and one of the only ones that has an international reputation.

The gallery shows work by well-known Vancouver artists such as Ian Wallace, Brian Jungen, and Geoffrey Farmer.

The gallery has taken the work of Vancouver artists to curated art shows and fairs such as The Armory Show (2001), Artforum Berlin (2002), Art Basel Miami Beach (2005, 2006, 2007, 2009), Toronto International Art Fair (2005, 2008), and Art Basel, Basel (2008, 2009, 2010, 2011, 2017).

== Artists ==
Catriona Jeffries Gallery represents artists such as:

- Abbas Akhavan
- Valérie Blass
- Raymond Boisjoly
- Rebecca Brewer
- Geoffrey Farmer
- Julia Feyrer
- Rochelle Goldberg
- Brian Jungen
- Janice Kerbel
- Duane Linklater
- Christina Mackie
- Myfanwy Macleod
- Liz Magor
- Elizabeth McIntosh
- Damian Moppett
- Jerry Pethick
- Judy Radul
- Kevin Schmidt
- Ron Terada
- Ian Wallace
- Ashes Withyman
