= Julia Feyrer =

Canadian visual artist

Julia Katherine Feyrer
- Born: September 20, 1982 (age 43); Victoria, British Columbia, Canada
- Education: Emily Carr University of Art and Design; Städelschule, Staatliche Hochschule für Bildende Künste

Julia Feyrer (born 1982) is a Canadian visual artist, performer, and writer based in Vancouver, British Columbia.

== Life and education ==
Feyrer was born in Victoria, British Columbia. They obtained a Bachelor of Media Art at the Emily Carr Institute of Art and Design in 2005 and completed their MA at the Städelschule, Staatliche Hochschule für Bildende Künste in Frankfurt am Main in 2010.

== Career ==
Julia Feyrer’s practice is cross-disciplinary, with a focus on photography, film, and mixed media installations. Their photographic work can be described as continuing to challenge "alchemical transformations of the daguerreotype" of staged settings recorded as historical documents.

== Exhibitions ==
=== Background Actors ===
An installation of video and sculptural elements, exploring perception and the limits of modern science.

=== Escape Scenes ===
An exhibition of 16mm, cyanotype and artist books at the Western Front in 2014, related to mediated perception and measurement. The 16mm film produced for this exhibition was later exhibited at the Vancouver Art Gallery as part of the exhibition Ambivalent Pleasures (2016).

=== Kitchen ===
In their exhibition and residency at grunt gallery in 2014, Feyrer transformed the main gallery space into a site-specific environment to engage with materials and documentation they retrieved from the grunt archives.

grunt gallery curator Vanessa Kwan wrote texts over the course of the exhibition and residency which are available for the public at the gallery or through their website.

=== Alternatives and Opportunities ===
Alternatives and Opportunities (2012) was Feyrer’s first show at Catriona Jeffries Gallery. The show included 16mm film, sculptures, and daguerreotype prints. Among the works included was The Artist’s Studio (2012), a three-part daguerreotype based on Louis Daguerre’s daguerreotype of ‘an artist studio’ taken in 1836. In Little pitchers have ears (2012), Feyrer created a binaural microphone in the shape of a head that recorded their walk around the museum spaces of the Royal BC Museum in Victoria, BC. Their film, Dailies (2012), documents the production of clocks, which are described as being, "each ‘alive’ yet paralyzed in their moment, performing a durational yet non-progressive trick precariously and nervously."

The daguerreotypes of The Artist’s Studio (2012) were acquired by the Morris and Helen Belkin Art Gallery, Vancouver, BC., in 2012.

=== The Poodle Dog Ornamental Bar ===
Feyrer’s first solo exhibition, The Poodle Dog Ornamental Bar (2010) was held at Artspeak in Vancouver. It consisted of a 9-minute film based on an installation that recreated a late 19th century Vancouver bar on the 300-block of West Cordova Street. Their interest in the Vancouver bar came about when they encountered an archival photograph of the bar’s vacant interior.

=== Group and collaborative exhibitions ===
Feyrer met fellow Canadian artist Tamara Henderson in Frankfurt in 2007 and they have since informed each other’s artistic inquiries, culminating in several collaborative exhibitions. Their first collaborative work was the screening Ett historia den objekt, snö vax skugga, There Ain’t No Cure (2010) screened in Berlin, Germany.

Feyrer and Henderson collaborated and were included in the group exhibition Insomnia at Bonniers Konsthall, Stockholm, Sweden. This exhibition "revolved around sleeplessness as a cultural symptom." It brought "together a group of contemporary artists" and "key works by Andy Warhol" amongst other artists. Feyrer and Henderson's works are "manifestations of excursions into different modes of consciousness."

Feyrer and Henderson have three notable collaborative exhibitions: Bottles Under the Influence: Julia Feyrer and Tamara Henderson at the Walter Phillips Gallery, Banff (2013); Tamara Henderson and Julia Feyrer: Consider the Belvedere at the Institute of Contemporary Art, Philadelphia (2015); and The Last Waves at the Morris and Helen Belkin Art Gallery, Vancouver, British Columbia, Canada (2016). These exhibitions are seen as a three-part project taking place in three different galleries. André Breton’s Surrealist texts, such as the First Surrealist Manifesto (1940), are often referenced when discussing the collaborators’ artworks. Further, Breton’s The Communicating Vessels (1939), which connects the nature of Surrealism with everyday objects, serves as a passageway into Feyrer and Henderson’s collaborations, which engage with film, sculpture, installation, performance, and book objects. Their exhibition at the Morris and Helen Belkin Art Gallery was described as being able to "plunge us into a world of dreams" such as the ones we unconsciously experience during our sleep. Their collaborative art practice layers a myriad of references to film and literature while simultaneously expressing an interest in the symbolic significance of the materials they use. Their collaborative works were also exhibited as part of The Metamorphosis (2018), at the Vancouver Art Gallery.

In 2015, Feyrer collaborated with Derya Akay on the exhibition Walk: Geometry of Knowing that was presented at SFU Gallery.

== Awards ==
Mayor's Art Award, City of Vancouver, 2011

== Writing ==
Feyrer is the co-editor of the online audiozine Spoox and author of a series of artist books from Perro Verlag Press.

== Publications ==
- Feyrer, Julia and Tamara Henderson. Julia Feyrer and Tamara Henderson. Vancouver, BC: Morris and Helen Belkin Art Gallery, 2019.
- Feyrer, Julia. Script Ruin by Page Turner. Vancouver, BC: Perro Verlag, 2014.
- Feyrer, Julia and Tamara Henderson. Les Bouitelles de la Table Ronde. Vancouver, BC: Perro Verlag Publishing, 2013.
- Feyrer, Julia and Erik Lavesson. The Rotting Husk. Frankfurt, Germany: Leonhardi Kultur Projekte, 2012.
- Feyrer, Julia. The Wandering Art Metropole Publications and Ephemera Archive. Vancouver, BC: Project Space, 2012.
- Feyrer, Julia. Scrap Book. Vancouver, BC: Perro Verlag Publishing, 2010.
- Feyrer, Julia. Comedy Tragedy. Vancouver, BC: Perro Verlag Publishing, 2009.
- Editor, Spoox Audiozine, Issues 1 - 8. 2006 - 2010.
- Editor, Upsilon Epsilon Magazine, Issues 1 - 3. 2004 - 2006.
