= Onyeka Igwe =

Nigerian London-based artist and filmmaker (born 1986)

- Born: 1986 (age 39–40); London, UK
- Occupations: Artist; filmmaker; photographer
- Website: onyekaigwe.com

Onyeka Igwe (born 1986) is a British-Nigerian artist and filmmaker. Her works have been screened at MoMA, Open City Documentary Festival in 2021 and 2022, Rotterdam International in the Netherlands from 2018 to 2020, Scotiabank Contact Photography Festival, and Smithsonian African American film festival in 2018, among others.

== Career ==
=== No Dance, No Palaver ===
No Dance, No Palaver is a short documentary shown in 2017 and 2018. The work received critical review as it told The Aba Women's Riots of 1929 and the "visual trauma of the colonial archive" and attempted "to transform the way in which we know the people it contains".

=== Recent works, 2019 ===
The names have been changed, including my own and truths have been altered was a short story documented by Onyeka in 2019. It was a story about her grandfather told in four different ways. It was centered on African diaspora. In 2023, The Museum of West African Art headed Nigeria Pavilion which was curated at the 2024 Venice Biennale where Onyeka participated alongside Yinka Shonibare, Tunji Adeniyi-Jones, Ndidi Dike, Fatimah Tuggar, Toyin Ojih Odutola, Precious Okoyomon and Abraham Oghobase.

== Exhibitions ==
=== Solo ===
- A Repertoire of Protest (No Dance, No Palaver), MoMA PS1, New York (2023)
- The Miracle on George Green, The High Line, New York, USA (2022)
- A so-called archive, LUX, London, UK
- THE REAL STORY IS WHAT'S IN THAT ROOM, Mercer Union, Toronto, Canada (2021)
- There Were Two Brothers, Jerwood Foundation (2019)
- Corrections, with Aliya Pabani, Trinity Square Video, Toronto, Canada (2018).

=== Group ===
- Lagos Peckham Repeat: Pilgrimage to the Lakes, South London Gallery (2023)
- Echoes, Haus der Kunst, Munich, Germany (2022)
- Reconfigured, Timothy Taylor New York, USA (2021)
- Archives of Resistance, Neue Galerie, Innsbruck, Austria (2021)
- KW Production Series, Berlin, Germany (2020)
- New Labor Movements, McEvoy Foundation for the Arts, San Francisco, USA
- POST Colonial Bodies II, CC Matienzo, Buenos Aires, Argentina (2019)
- There's something in the conversation that is more interesting than the finality of (a title), London, UK (2018)
- World Cup!, Montreal, Canada (2018)

== Filmography ==
- The Names Have Changed, Including My Own And Truths Have Been Altered (2019)
- Ungentle (directed in 2022)
- The Miracle on George Green
- A So-Called Archive (2020)
- Specialised Technique (2018)
- Her Name in My Mouth (2017)
- Sitting on a Man (2018)
- We Need New Names (2015)
- A Radical Duet (2023)
- No Archive Can Restore You (2020)
- Congregations (2013)
- No Dance, No Palaver

== Publications ==
- Igwe, O. (2021). Unbossed and Unbound: How Can Critical Proximity Transfigure British Colonial Moving Images?. United Kingdom: University of the Arts, London.
- The Interjection Calendar 008. United Kingdom: Montez Press. April 2023. ISBN 9781838376086.
- Being Close To, With or Amongst, The Feminist Review (2020)
- Hiraeth, or Queering Time in Archives Otherwise (with JD Stokely), Alphaville Journal of Film and Screen Media (2019)
- Feature Interview with June Givanni
- Migrating Bodies

== Awards and nominations ==
In 2022, Onyeka Igwe was nominated for the Jarman Award and Max Mara Art Prize for Women. In 2021, she won the Foundwork Artist Prize and the 2020 Arts Foundation Futures Award for Experimental Short Film. In 2019, Onyeka won the Berwick New Cinema Awards at Berwick Film & Media Arts Festival. Alongside Seán Elder, Rebecca Moss and AJ Stockwell, she was listed by The Guardian as Also showing Exhibition of the week for Jerwood staging series.
