= Raymond Boisjoly =

Canadian artist (born 1981)

- Born: 1981 (age 44–45); Langley, British Columbia
- Education: Bachelor of Fine Arts (BFA) from the Emily Carr University of Art and Design (2006); Master of Fine Arts (MFA) from the University of British Columbia (2008)
- Known for: artist

Raymond Boisjoly (born 1981) is an Aboriginal artist of Haida and Québécois origin based in Vancouver, British Columbia, Canada. His practice combines technological processes together with discourse focused on cultural propriety, satire, and poetic texts of mystifying origins. Boisjoly recognizes, emulates, and adapts the ideas and processes of other artists. His artwork leads the viewer to consider or even focus our thinking on how we perceive and accept culture into our lives. He is an assistant professor at the school for the contemporary arts at Simon Fraser University.

== Background ==
Raymond Boisjoly holds a Bachelor of Fine Arts (BFA) from the Emily Carr University of Art and Design (2006) and he completed a Master of Fine Arts (MFA) at the University of British Columbia (2008).

Boisjoly was invited to visit on a self-directed fellowship by curator Kitty Scott at the Banff Centre for Arts and Creativity in Alberta. Scott gave him some very important advice and questions during a studio visit, which led Boisjoly to create the iconic work named Makeshift (2010–12) at an early stage in his career. In 2013 upon consideration for the Brink award—a prize awarded to artists in the Northwest by the University of Washington's Henry Art Gallery, Boisjoly met San Francisco artist Arnold Kemp, who continues to be a key influence in his career.

== Exhibitions ==
Raymond Boisjoly has exhibited his art at: Les Ateliers de Rennes (2018), the Vancouver Art Gallery in Vancouver, British Columbia (2016; 2012–14); The Power Plant in Toronto, Ontario (2012); VOX in Montreal, Quebec (2016); Carleton University in Ottawa, Ontario (2015); Platform Centre for Photographic + Digital Arts in Winnipeg, Manitoba (2014); SITE Santa Fe in Santa Fe, New Mexico (2014); Triangle France in Marseille, France (2014); Camera Austria in Vienna, Austria (2014); and Biennale de Montréal in Montreal, Quebec (2014). Boisjoly is also currently exhibiting his art at Catriona Jeffries in Vancouver, British Columbia.

== Awards ==
In 2016, Boisjoly received the VIVA Award from Vancouver Art Gallery. In 2015 and 2017, Boisjoly was a finalist for the Sobey Art Award, Canada's largest prize for young Canadian artists. Boisjoly was also a finalist for the 2017 AIMIA|AGO (Art Gallery of Ontario) Photography Prize. He became a Guggenheim Fellow in 2026, from the Guggenheim Foundation.

== Select works ==
- Makeshift and Makeshift I, 2010, inkjet prints and painters tape.
- Intervals, 2013, a series of photographic images. Boisjoly created medium- and large-scale inkjet prints by playing YouTube versions of musical performances on his iPod, and then dragging the device across a scanner to digitally capture these moments in still images.
- Author’s Preface, 2015, 25 solvent-based inkjet prints and premixed wallpaper paste.
