= Valérie Blass =

Canadian artist (born 1967)

- Born: December 10, 1967 (age 58); Montreal, Quebec
- Education: Université du Québec à Montréal
- Known for: sculptor
- Awards: Gershon Iskowitz Prize, 2017

Valérie Blass (born 1967) is a Canadian artist working primarily in sculpture. She lives and works in her hometown of Montreal, Quebec, and is represented by Catriona Jeffries, in Vancouver. She received both her Bachelor of Fine Arts and Master of Fine Arts, specializing in visual and media arts, from the Université du Québec à Montréal. She employs a variety of sculptural techniques, including casting, carving, moulding, and bricolage to create strange and playful arrangements of both found and constructed objects.

In a 2011 article in the Canadian magazine The Walrus, her practice of sculptural assemblage was compared to artists such as Marcel Duchamp and Louise Bourgeois. Her work has been collected by the National Gallery of Canada, Musée d'art contemporain de Montréal, the Royal Bank of Canada, and several other private collections.

== Theory and practice ==
=== Collage ===
Blass relies on the process of collage in her works, focusing on materials that have a relationship either formally or conceptually to bring new meaning out of the objects through their correlation.

=== Doubling ===
Doubling in Blass' practice diverts the viewer's attention from the object as it is to the relationships it has with a similar object. Blass distorts the second sculpture using a myriad of approaches; One of the approaches that is used in Blass’s doubling is using the same texture for two sculptures and creating a figurative and abstract relationship.

"The double turns up repeatedly in my work: the idea of two things with the same shape and the same motif and then a different shape with the same motif. My motivation is about wanting to use material over which I don't have too much control, but material that will give me some object and some shape"

=== Continuation of discontinuity ===
Blass's practice challenges the idea of a complete "form." She approaches to the challenge through purposely deconstruct, then reconstruct and reconfigure in an unexpected way. She states that she does not think in advance and is open to contingency that occurs during the process.

== Notable exhibitions ==
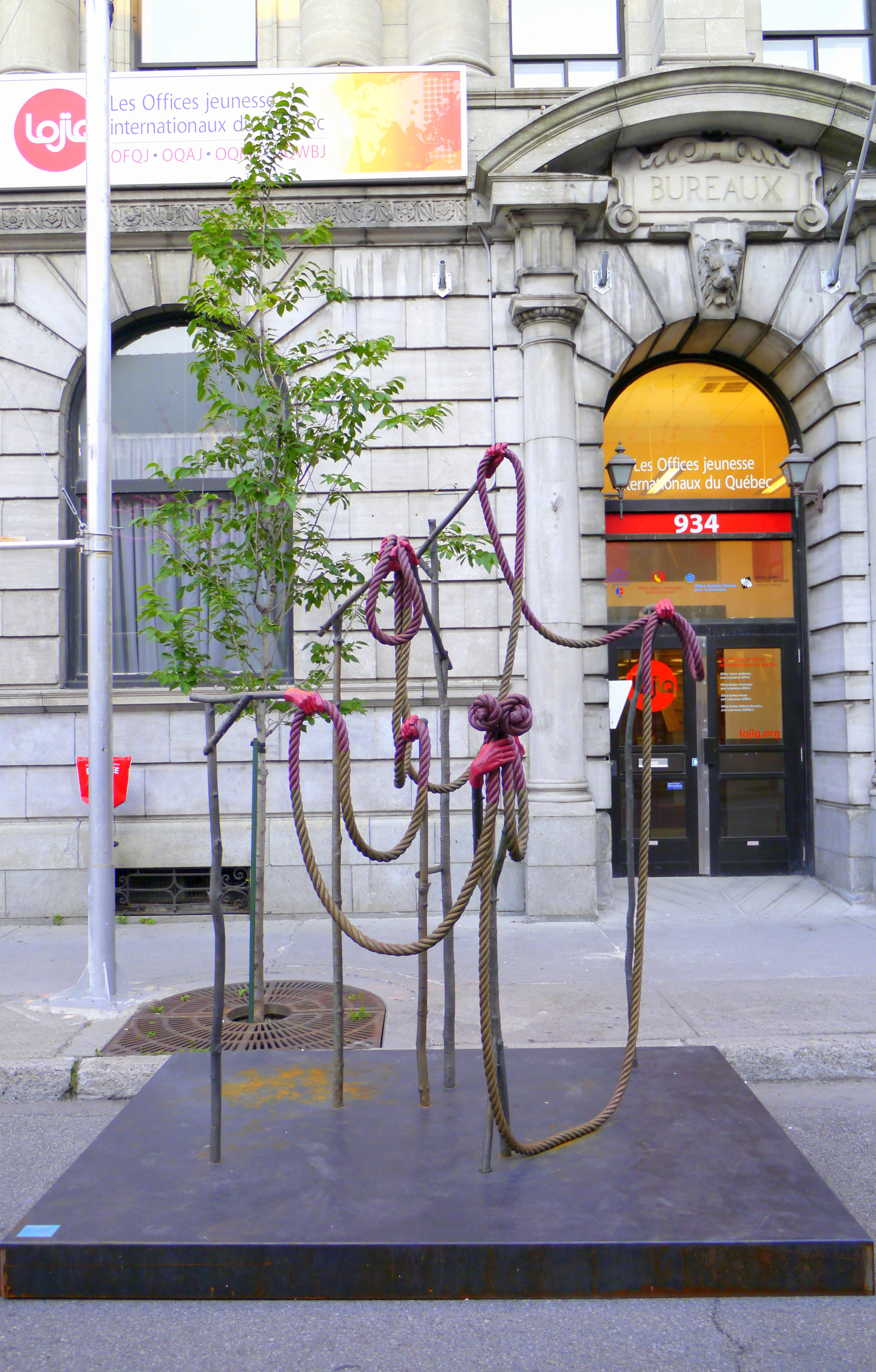
Valérie Blass, 2014, Aires Libres, rue Sainte-Catherine, Montréal

=== Solo exhibitions ===
2019

- Le parlement des invisibles, Art Gallery of Ontario, Toronto, Canada
- The Mime, the Model and the Dupe, Oakville Galleries, Oakville, Canada; Douglas Hyde Gallery, Dublin, Ireland

2015

- To only ever say one thing forever the same thing, Catriona Jeffries, Vancouver
- My Life, Artspeak, Vancouver; Daniel Faria Gallery, Toronto, Canada

2014

- Théâtre d’objets, Parisian Laundry, Montreal, Canada

2013

- Parisian Laundry Projects, The Hole NYC, New York, USA

Galeri Manâ, Istanbul, Turkey

Illingworth Kerr Gallery, Alberta College of Art and Design, Calgary, Canada

- The manipulator manipulated

La Chambre Blanche, Quebec City, Canada

2012

- Blass' work was presented in a major solo exhibition at the Musée d'art contemporain de Montréal alongside accompanying solo exhibitions featuring works by Ghada Amer and Wangechi Mutu.

2011

- PETIT LOSANGE LAQUÉ VEINÉ, Parisian Laundry in Montreal

2009

- Museum of Contemporary Canadian Art in Toronto in 2009.

=== Group exhibitions ===
Blass' work has been presented in several notable group exhibitions, including the inaugural Québec Triennial at the Musée d'art contemporain de Montréal in 2008, Nothing to Declare: Current Sculpture from Canada at The Power Plant in Toronto in 2009, Oh, Canada, a major survey of contemporary Canadian Art at MASS MoCA in 2012. and It is What it Is, an exhibition featuring recent acquisitions of contemporary Canadian Art at the National Gallery of Canada in 2010/2011.

In 2015, Blass presented new sculptural work featuring sculptural busts, distorted mirrors, and casts of human limbs in an exhibition titled My Life at Artspeak, Vancouver before travelling to the commercial gallery Daniel Faria, Toronto.

== Awards ==
- 2017 Gershon Iskowitz Prize by the Art Gallery of Ontario and the Gershon Iskowitz Foundation.
- 2016 : Prix Ozias-Leduc, Fondation Émile-Nelligan
- 2012: Victor Martyn Lynch-Staunton Award, Visual Arts, Canada Council for the Arts
- 2010: Prix Louis-Comtois, City of Montreal, Montreal, Canada
