= Tanya Lukin Linklater =

Alutiiq artist and choreographer (born 1976)

- Born: 1976 (age 49–50); Kodiak Island, Alaska, United States
- Education: Stanford University; University of Alberta
- Known for: Collaborative performance artist, installation artist
- Spouse: Duane Linklater
- Website: www.tanyalukinlinklater.com

Tanya Lukin Linklater (born 1976) is an artist-choreographer of Alutiiq descent. Her work consists of performance collaborations, videos, photographs, and installations.

== Biography ==
Linklater was raised in Afognak and Port Lions in Kodiak Island (Alaska). She is of settler and Alaskan descent. Married to Omaskêko Ininiwakartist Duane Linklater, she now lives and works in North Bay, Ontario, Canada.

Holding a B.A. (honours) from Stanford University and a M.Ed. from the University of Alberta, Linklater is currently pursuing a PhD in cultural studies at Queen's University in Kingston, Ontario, Canada.

Her practice includes performance, works for camera, writings, and installations, with an emphasis on collaboration with other Indigenous artists. Linklater's work is informed by the relationships between bodies, histories, poetry, pedagogy, Indigenous conceptual spaces, including Indigenous languages, and institutions.

Linklater was selected as the first Annual Indigenous Artist-In-Residence at All My Relations Arts in Minneapolis, Minnesota. She served in the role from February 26 to March 5, 2017. That same year she was named artist-in-residence at the Art Gallery of Ontario (AGO). During her August residency, she collaborated with dancers on the performance Sun Force as a response to the AGO's exhibition Rita Letendre: Fire and Light.

In 2017, she co-founded the Wood Land School at the SBC Gallery of Contemporary Art along with her husband and fellow artist, Duane, curator cheyanne turions and artist-author Walter Kaheró:ton Scott. Wood Land School: Kahatenhstánion tsi na'tetiatere ne Iotohrkó:wa tánon Iotohrha / Drawing Lines from January to December was explained by the collection as a "single year-long exhibition that will unfold through a series of gestures—clusters of activity that bring works into and out of the gallery space—such that the exhibition is in a constant state of becoming."

In 2022, Tanya participated in the Aichi Triennale and the Toronto Biennial of Art.

== Awards ==
In 2013, Linklater received the K.M. Hunter Artist Award in Literature. She has also been awarded multiple grants from the Ontario Arts Council. In 2018, Linklater was awarded the Inaugural Wanda Koop Research Fund, presented by Canadian Art magazine.

== Select exhibitions ==
=== Solo ===
- Constellation/conversation (with Leanne Betasamosake Simpson, Cris Derksen, Layli Long Soldier, and cheyanne turions), ArtSpace, Peterborough, Ontario (2016).
- A Parallel Excavation (with Duane Linklater), curated by Ociciwan Contemporary Art Collective, Art Gallery of Alberta, Edmonton, Alberta (2016).
- Determined by the River (with Duane Linklater), Remai Modern, Saskatoon, Saskatchewan. (2017)
- Slay All Day: Tanya Lukin Linklater, ma ma, Toronto. (2018)

=== Group ===
- Reading the Line, with Alma Alloro, Anne Low, Maggie Groat, and Lis Rhodes at Western Front (2015).
- Le Grand Balcon, Musée d'art contemporain de Montréal, Montreal, Quebec (2016).
- Traces, Urban Shaman, Winnipeg, Manitoba (2017).
- A Few Similar Things, Truck Gallery, Calgary, Alberta (2017).
- Wood Land School: Kahatenhstánion tsi na’tetiatere ne Iotohrkó:wa tánon Iotohrha / Drawing Lines from January to December, SBC Gallery of Contemporary Art, Montreal, Quebec (2017).
- Wood Land School: Under the Mango Tree, Documenta 14, Athens, Greece, and Kassel, Germany (2017).
- INSURGENCE/RESURGENCE, Winnipeg Art Gallery, Winnipeg, Manitoba (2017).
- Art for a New Understanding: Native Voices, 1950s to Now, Crystal Bridges Museum of American Art, Bentonville, Arkansas (2018).
- In Dialogue, organized by John G. Hampton, Art Gallery of Southwestern Manitoba, Brandon, Manitoba. Co-produced by the Art Museum at the University of Toronto, the Art Gallery of Southwestern Manitoba, and the Carleton University Art Gallery (2018).
- Inaabiwin (with Scott Benesiinaabandan, Hannah Claus, Meryl McMaster, and Greg Staats), curated by Danielle Printup, Robert McLaughlin Gallery, Oshawa, Ontario (2018) [touring exhibition].
- Indigenous geometries (with Tiffany Shaw-Collinge, composer Laura Ortman, dancers Ivanie Aubin-Malo and Ceinwen Gobert), Chicago Architecture Biennial, Chicago (2019).
- Soft Power, San Francisco Museum of Modern Art, San Francisco, California. (2019).
- Soundings: An Exhibition in Five Parts, curated by Candice Hopkins (Tlingit) and Dylan Robinson (Stó:lō), Agnes Etherington Arts Centre, Kingston, Ontario (2019).
- Are You My Mother?, Dunlop Art Gallery, Regina, Saskatchewan (2019).
- Larger Than Memory: Contemporary Art From Indigenous North America (2020).

== Publications ==
- Three Parts on Poetry: Orality and Action, The Edges and the centre, Voices On Her Cures, Tanya Lukin Linklater, Hanne Lippard, and Tiziana La Melia, C Magazine, Issue 127.
- The Insistence of a Crow Archivist: Wendy Red Star, Tanya Lukin Linklater, BlackFlash Magazine, 2017.
- Slow Scrape, 2020.
