= Maggie Groat =

Canadian artist and educator

- Occupations: Artist, Educator, Editor
- Website: http://www.maggiegroat.com/

Maggie Groat is an artist and educator who lives in Canada. She received her Master of Fine Arts at the University of Guelph in 2010. Groat has taught at the University of Guelph, University of Toronto, and at Emily Carr University of Art and Design, where she was the Audain Artist Scholar in Residence in 2014.

== Artistic Practice ==
Groat has a research-based practice and works with a wide range of media, including collage, works on paper, sculpture, textiles, site-specific interventions, and publications. Her work addresses marginalized ways of knowing, salvage practices, and the relationships and reconnections to place through a hybrid Indigenous and settler perspective.

== Awards ==
In 2017, the Kitchener-Waterloo Art Gallery won the Ontario Association of Art Galleries annual award for Groat's exhibition, Maggie Groat: Sun also Seasons, and an honourable mention in the art book category for ALMANAC, which Groat had edited.

In 2015 and 2018, Groat was nominated and long listed for the Sobey Art Award.

In 2012, Groat won the Artists' Book of the Moment for Studies For Possible Futures.

== Select exhibitions ==
In 2018, Groat exhibited at the Or Gallery in Vancouver, with Joar Nango and Leya Tess. The exhibition was titled We Built a House Out of the Things We Had Gathered and was curated by Laurie White.

- Soundings: An Exhibition in Five Parts (2019-2023 touring), curated by Candice Hopkins and Dylan Robinson, organized by Agnes Etherington Art Centre, Queens University, Canada and Independent Curators International (ICI). The exhibition toured multiple galleries, including the Morris and Helen Belkin Art Gallery.
- Intervals (2020), digital image commission presented by Mercer Union.
- The Life of Things (2019), at MOMENTA Biennale de L'image in Montreal.
- Object Lessons (2018), curated by Beatriz Asfora at the Kitchener-Waterloo Art Gallery.
- Sun also Seasons (2017), solo exhibition at the Kitchener-Waterloo Art Gallery.
- Reading the Line (2015), group exhibition with Alma Alloro, Anne Low, Tanya Lukin Linklater, and Lis Rhodes at Western Front artist-run centre.
