= Nelson Park, Vancouver =

Park in Vancouver, British Columbia, Canada

Coordinates: 49°16′58″N 123°07′47″W

Nelson Park is a park in Vancouver, British Columbia. It was funded by the city charging development fees. Nelson Park is located in Vancouver's West End, and is bounded by Nelson St., Bute St., Comox St. and Thurlow Street. Nelson Park hosts one of Vancouver´s community gardens.
