= Jenny Perlin =

American artist

Jenny Perlin (born 1970) is an American artist.

== Education ==
Perlin earned a Bachelor of Arts in Literature and Society from Brown University and her Masters of Fine Arts from the School of the Art Institute of Chicago in Film.

== Collections ==
Her work is included in the collections of the Whitney Museum of American Art, the Seattle Art Museum and the Museum of Modern Art, New York., the School of the Art Institute of Chicago

== Publications ==
- Maelstrom, 2020
- the first one hundred: The Hoosac Institute, 2020
- The Measures, 2018
- The Same Moon Everywhere, 2014
- Perseverance and How to Develop It, 2006
