= Vanessa Kwan =

Canadian art curator and artist

Vanessa Kwan is an art curator and artist based in Vancouver, British Columbia, Canada.

== Early life and education ==
Kwan was born in St. John’s, Newfoundland. They graduated from Emily Carr University in 2004.

== Career ==
Kwan worked at the Richmond Art Gallery, British Columbia and the Vancouver Art Gallery early in their career. Kwan created Vancouver Vancouver Vancouver, a public art work for the 2010 Winter Olympics. In 2013, Kwan created an interactive piece which was temporarily sited at the Bob Prittie Burnaby Public Library.

In 2014, they became curator of the grunt gallery until 2019 when they became program director. As a curator, Kwan stated that their goal was to produce "artist projects that engage with the community, are site-specific, and are generally not situated inside the gallery."

In 2017, Kwan completed a post residency in Visual + Digital Arts at the Banff Centre for Arts and Creativity, Banff, Calgary, and received the Post Residency Award from the Banff Centre for Residency.

In 2022, they became director and curator of the Libby Leshgold Gallery at Emily Carr University (ECU).
