= Ron Terada =

Canadian artist (born 1969)

Ron Terada (born 1969) is a Vancouver-based artist working in various media, including painting, photography, video, sound, books, and graphic design.

== Life and work ==
Terada received his Fine Arts diploma in 1991 from Emily Carr University of Art and Design in Vancouver, British Columbia. From 1998 to 2007, he held a sessional faculty position at the same institution.

In 2006, Terada received the Victor Martyn Lynch-Staunton Award, Canada Council for the Arts. He is also a recipient of the VIVA Award, The Jack & Doris Shadbolt Foundation for the Visual Arts (2004).

Terada, who lives and works in Vancouver, often draws from past art historical figures and popular culture to reflect on familiar narratives and frequently on aspiration and failure.

His practice calls attention to existing cultural forms and their operation as signs. Past works have adapted gallery signage, posters, brochures, and exhibition soundtracks to question the statements of cultural institutions. Additionally, Terada, who is of Japanese-Canadian descent, often uses his own position within the Vancouver art world as the starting point for measuring his own self-worth, self-esteem, and self-identification.

Terada is represented by the Catriona Jeffries Gallery based in Vancouver.

== Exhibitions ==
While not widely known in the United States, Terada has exhibited extensively in Canada and Europe over the past 15 years.

The Museum of Contemporary Art, Chicago, holds Terada's first U.S. solo museum show titled Ron Terada: Being There November 5, 2011 – January 15, 2012. The exhibition is curated by MCA James W. Alsdorf Chief Curator Michael Darling.

Recent solo shows include Who I Think I Am at the Walter Philips Gallery, Banff, Canada (2010). Terada has exhibited recently in the group show It Is What It Is at the National Gallery of Canada (2010).

== Collections ==
Terada has work in museum collections throughout Canada, as well as in Los Angeles and the United Kingdom.

- Agnes Etherington Art Centre, Queen’s University, Kingston, Ontario
- Art Gallery of Nova Scotia, Halifax, Nova Scotia
- Art Gallery of Ontario, Toronto, Ontario
- Ikon Gallery, Birmingham, UK
- Morris & Helen Belkin Art Gallery, University of British Columbia, Vancouver
- Musée d’art contemporain de Montréal, Quebec
- Museum of Contemporary Art, Los Angeles, California
- National Gallery of Canada, Ottawa, Ontario
- Vancouver Art Gallery, Vancouver, British Columbia
