= Tamara Henderson =

Canadian artist

Tamara Henderson (born 1982) is a Canadian artist. Henderson is known for her installation works incorporating film, painting and sculpture. She studied at NSCAD University, Halifax, the Städelschule, Frankfurt and received an MFA degree from the Royal Institute of Art, Stockholm.

In 2013 she was shortlisted for the Sobey Art Award. Her works are included in the collections of the Vancouver Art Gallery, the Moderna Museet, Stockholm and the Tate Gallery.
