= Duane Linklater =

Omaskêko Ininiwak artist (born 1976)

- Born: 1976 (age 49–50); Moose Factory, Ontario, Canada
- Education: Bard College; University of Alberta
- Spouse: Tanya Lukin
- Awards: Sobey Art Award (2013)

Duane Linklater (born 1976) is an artist of Omaskêko Cree ancestry.

== Biography ==
Born in Moose Factory, Ontario, Canada, Linklater now lives in North Bay. He is married to artist-choreographer, Tanya Lukin Linklater.

Linklater attended the University of Alberta from 2000-2005 and was awarded a Bachelor of Native Studies and a Bachelor of Fine Arts. He also studied at Bard College's Milton Avery Graduate School of the Arts from 2010 and completed a Master of Fine Arts in video and film in 2012.

== Selected exhibitions ==
Linklater has exhibited his work at various galleries and exhibitions including the Art Gallery of Ontario (2013); documenta 14; the Utah Museum of Fine Arts (2015); the Vancouver Art Gallery (2015); and the Art Gallery of Alberta (2016).

In 2018, Linklater installed pêyakotênaw—a public artwork comprising three large teepee sculptures—along the High Line in New York. In an exhibition shown in 2021 in Seattle and in Chicago in 2023, Linklater employed a range of mediums -- sculpture, video and textile -- in order "to address the contradictions of contemporary Indigenous life within—and beyond—settler systems of knowledge, representation, and value." Linklater was featured in the 2022 Whitney Biennial: Quiet as It's Kept, at the Whitney Museum of American Art, New York. In 2023, the Art Gallery of Hamilton exhibited Duane Linklater: they have piled the stone / as they promised / without syrup which explored the architecture of the Bishop Fauquier Memorial Chapel in Sault Ste. Marie, Ontario, a small Gothic and Tudor style sandstone chapel built in 1881. Also in 2023, the Berkeley Art Museum and Pacific Film Archive (BAMPFA) organized Duane Linklater: mymothersside, the artist’s first major survey exhibition which included large-scale structures, sculpture and video that focused on enduring ancestral practices as well as digital translations of tribal objects held in institutional collections.

He is represented by Catriona Jeffries Gallery.

== Selected works ==
- Modest Livelihood, a project with Brian Jungen about a hunting trip that was commissioned for documenta (13) curated by Carolyn Christov-Bakargiev.
- Distances, Origins, and Other Concerns, an open letter to the Metropolitan Museum of Art in New York City critical of the institution's display of a Cree object from the mid-1800s that was commissioned for Art in General by curator Laurel Ptak.
- Mikikwan (2018), a concrete reproduction of a hide scraper.
- Tautology (2011-2013), a neon bird appropriated from a prominent painting by Norval Morrisseau.
- Cape Spear, a five-year intervention editing the Cape Spear Wikipedia page to add the words "At 6:24am NST 3/10/2011, Duane Linklater watched the sunrise. He traveled there to see the sunrise, to be the first one before anyone else."
- Learning, an exhibition in the Susan Hobbs Gallery, Toronto, organized by Althea Thauberger.
- What Then Remains, a permanent installation inside the longest wall in Mercer Union, Toronto.
- Monsters for beauty, permanence and individuality, 14 cast concrete sculptures at Don River Valley Park in Toronto.
- mymothersside, installation at the Frye Art Museum, Seattle, Washington(2021) and at the Museum of Contemporary Art Chicago (2023).

== Awards ==
In 2013, Linklater won the $50,000 Sobey Art Award. In May 2016, along with Geoffrey Farmer, Linklater was the inaugural recipient of a Be3Dimensional Innovation Fund grant of $50,000 for a 3D printing project. In July 2016, Linklater won the $15,000 Victor Martyn Lynch-Staunton Award for Media Arts, awarded by the Canada Council for the arts. In 2017, Linklater was awarded a public commission for the Don River Valley Park, Toronto.

== Sources ==
- "Duane Linklater - Canadian Art".
- ""Decolonizing the Collection": artists Duane Linklater, Christopher Stackhouse and anthropologist Audra Simpson at CUNY Graduate Center, 2015".
- "2013 Sobey Art Award won by Duane Linklater | Toronto Star". thestar.com. 9 October 2013. Archived from the original on 2013-10-11.
- "Artists Geoffrey Farmer, Duane Linklater earn 3D printing grants".
- "Geoffrey Farmer and Duane Linklater strike out for 'terra incognita' | Toronto Star". thestar.com. 27 May 2016. Archived from the original on 2016-05-28.
- Cochrane, Steven Leyden (21 July 2016). "Altered states". Winnipeg Free Press.
- "Edmonton unveils six new public art pieces for Indigenous Art Park". 2016-04-13.
- "Duane Linklater: Two worlds, gently colliding | Toronto Star". thestar.com. 21 June 2013. Archived from the original on 2013-06-27.
- "Unspooling the landscape with Brian Jungen and Duane Linklater".
- Berlin, Mira. "Duane Linklater".
