= Vancouver Community Gardens =

Community gardens in Vancouver, BC

The Vancouver Community Gardens are a group of community gardens located around the Vancouver area. Vancouver citizens involved in Community Gardens pledge to support the farm (via money, land or labour) and in turn receive a portion of the goods produced for personal use. Vancouver has over 75 community gardens in city parks and school yards.

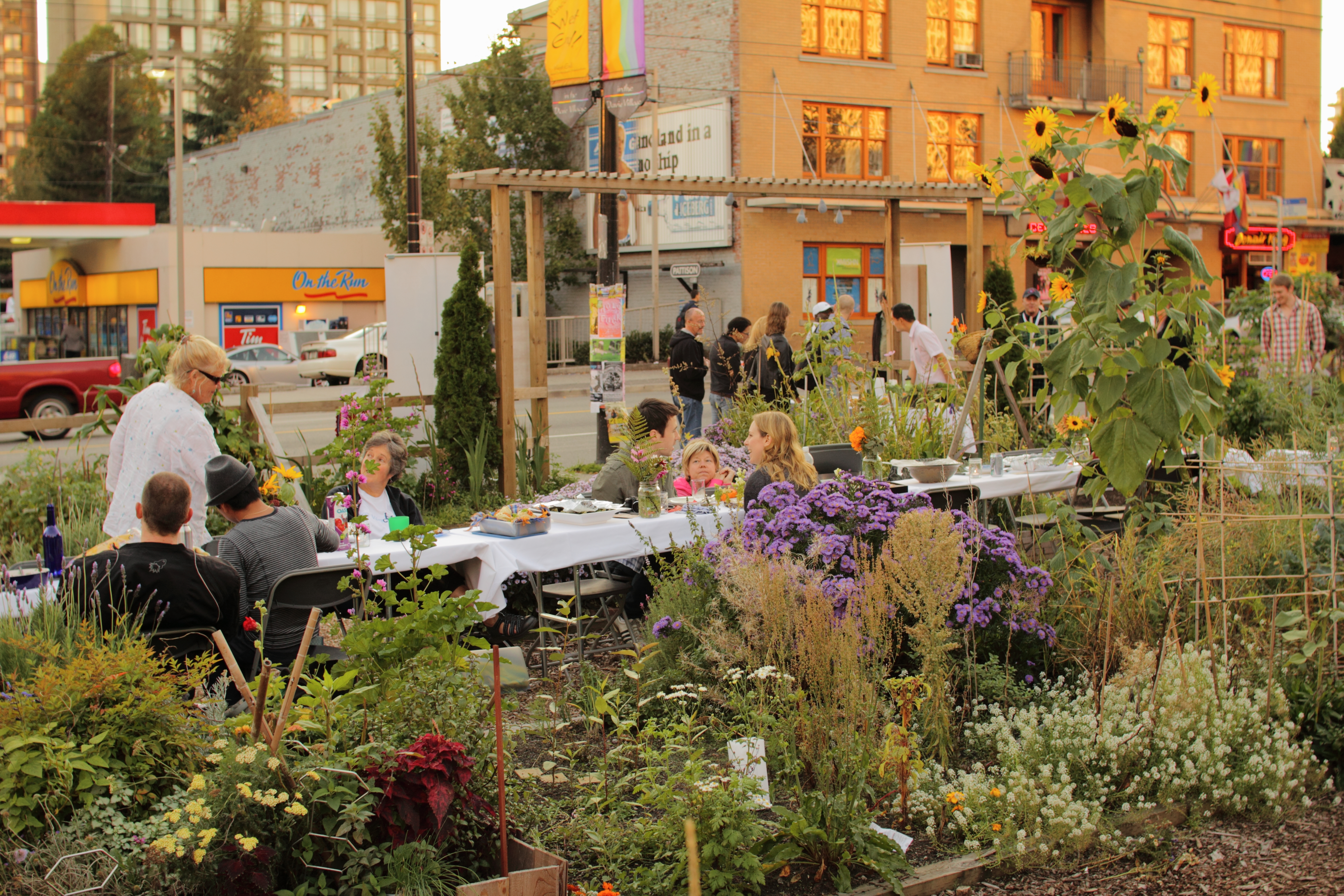
Davie Street community garden Vancouver BC Canada

== Process of becoming a Community Garden in Vancouver ==
The process of becoming a community garden involves an expression of interest application to the City of Vancouver. In order to be considered a community garden, the garden must grow crops for personal use, there must be a community development program and must increase biological diversity and educate the local community about food production.

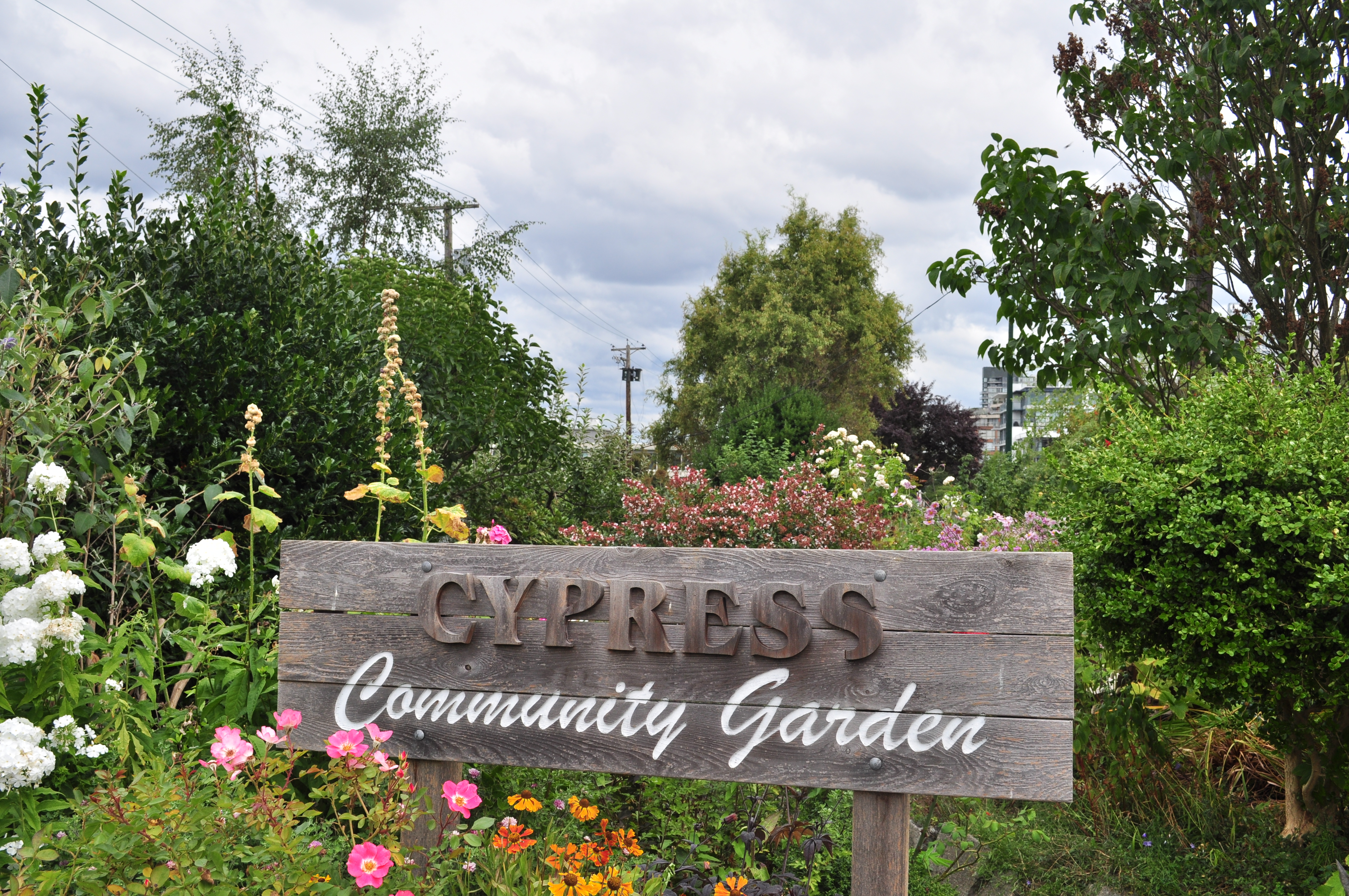
Cypress Community Garden Vancouver BC Canada

The city also supports the development of the community gardens by helping groups establish and run community gardens, help locate suitable land, make agreements to use the land, and develop environmental education programs.

Once approved, the community is allowed to operate the community garden according to the guidelines set by the City of Vancouver, British Columbia.

=== Government ===
Farms and food processing businesses can apply to receive financial funding and support (up to 85% of projects) from the British Columbia Ministry of Agriculture through its Growing Forward 2 Program. Urban Beekeeping was included in the urban agriculture bylaw as acceptable in the year 2005., while this law changed to include backyard chickens in 2010. Based on these policies, the City of Vancouver is now working toward achieving a goal in which 25% of the city's landscape is garden/farm land for edible produce.

== Benefits of Community Gardens ==
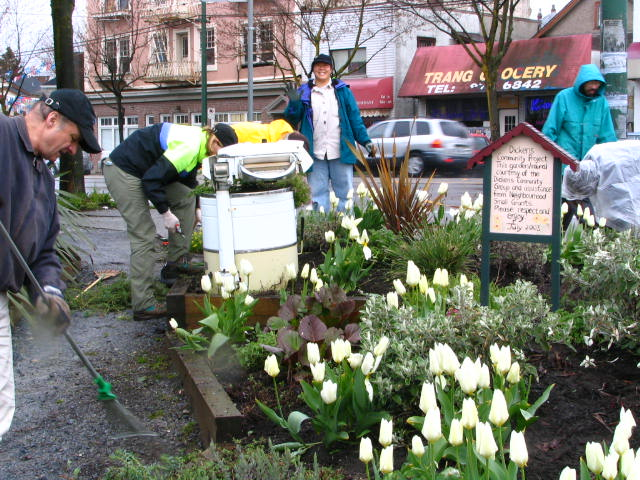
Community gardening, East Vancouver

Community Gardens have been shown to enhance nutrition and physical activity and promote the role of public health in improving the quality of life. The gardens have also been associated with community building and reduced crime rates. These results vary by city, however there are some important key elements that are common among successful community gardens.

- Leadership and Staffing: The city should provide adequate staffing and resources for the community as requested. This is especially crucial in the initial stages where the land is being transformed into a garden
- Volunteers and Community Partners: The involvement of the community is vital for the garden to thrive. This usually comes in the form of diverse volunteers from residences, schools, or businesses.
- Skill-Building Opportunities: Gardening workshops provide opportunities for residences to develop skills in leadership, community organizing, cultural competency, and program planning.

== Products Produced by Vancouver Community Gardens ==
The Climate of Vancouver is moderate and typically rainy; this allows for a large number of fruits and vegetables to be grown throughout the year. The following is a list of products available to various Community Gardens in Southwest British Columbia:

=== Vegetables ===
Dec-Mar	Apr-Jun	Jul-Aug	Sept-Nov
Beets	Asparagus	Artichokes	Artichokes
Brussels Sprouts	Beets	Green Beans	Beets
Cabbage- Red; Green	Broccoli	Beets	Broccoli
Carrots	Carrots	Broccoli	Brussels Sprouts
Kale	Cauliflower	Cabbage	Cabbage
Leeks	Celery	Carrots	Carrots
Onions	Swiss Chard	Cauliflower	Cauliflower
Parsnips	Fennel	Celery	Swiss Chard
Potatoes	Kale	Corn	Corn
Rutabaga	Lettuce	Swiss Chard	Celery
Squash	Mustard Greens	Cucumbers	Cucumbers
Turnips	Onions	Fennel	Fennel
	Peas	Garlic	Garlic
	Potatoes	Kale	Kale
	Radishes	Leeks	Leeks
	Rhubarb	Lettuce	Mustard Greens
	Salad Greens	Mustard Greens	Lettuce
	Spinach	Onions	Onions
	Squash	Parsnips	Parsnips
	Tomatoes	Peppers	Peppers
	Turnips	Potatoes	Potatoes
	Zucchini	Pumpkins	Pumpkins
	Rhubarb	Radishes	Radishes
		Rutabaga	Rutabaga
		Salad Greens	Salad Greens
		Shallots	Spinach
		Spinach	Squash
		Tomatoes	Tomatoes
		Turnips	Turnips
		Zucchini	Zucchini

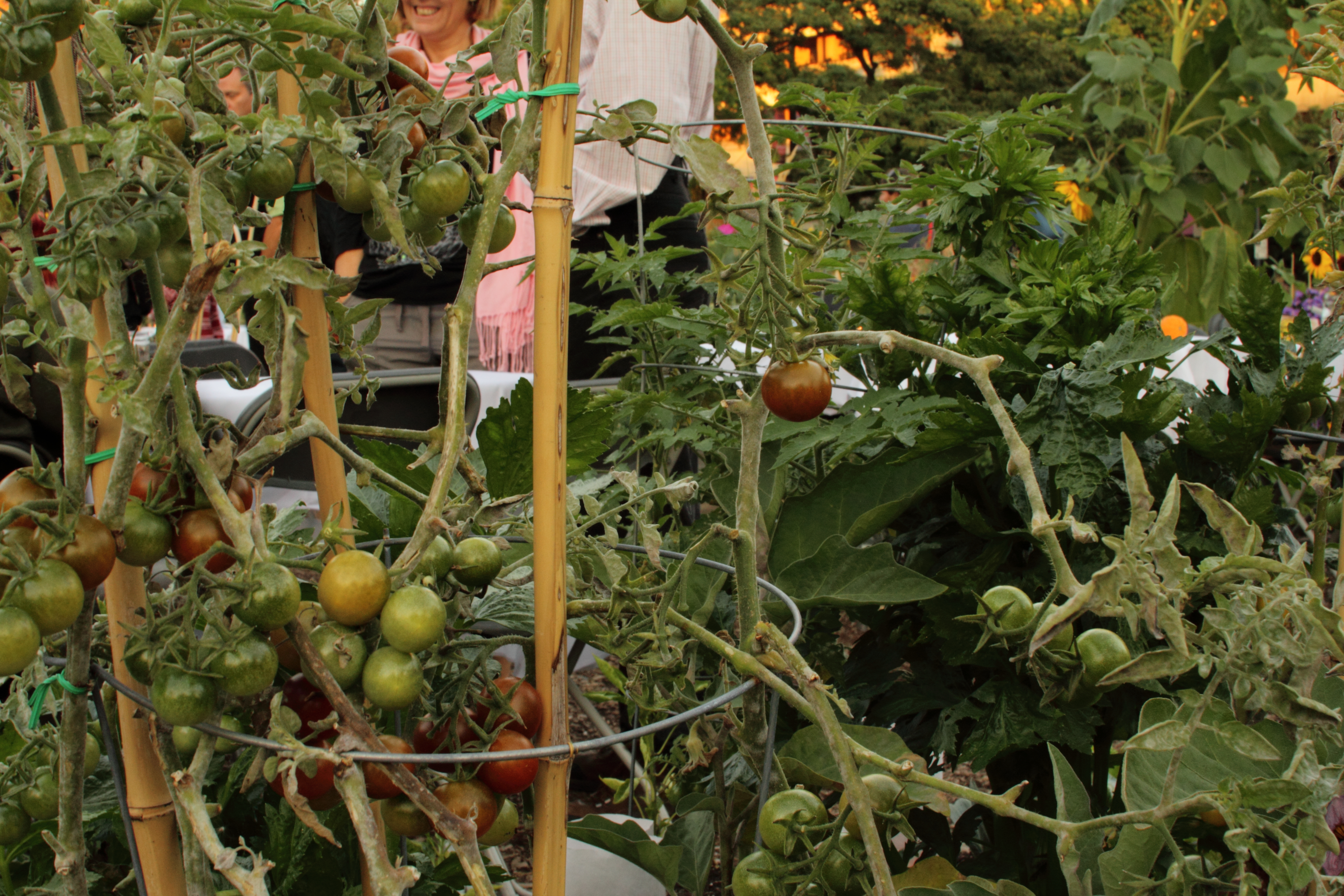
2010 Davie Street community garden tomatoes

=== Fruit ===
Dec-Mar	Apr-Jun	Jul-Aug	Sept-Nov
Apples	Gooseberries	Apples	Apples
Kiwis	Saskatoon berries	Apricots	Blueberries
Pears	Strawberries	Blackberries	Crab apples
		Blueberries	Cranberries
		Cherries	Grapes
		Crabapples	Kiwi
		Cranberries	Melons
		Melons	Pears
		Nectarines	Plums
		Peaches	Prunes
		Pears	Strawberries
		Plums	
		Plums	
		Prunes	
		Raspberries	
	Rhubarb	Saskatoon Berries	
		Strawberries	

=== Chickens and Eggs ===
While, in 2010, it became legal for individuals and communities to raise backyard chickens in Vancouver, certain guidelines do need to be followed.

- A maximum of 4 hens (no roosters), 4 months or older, is allowed per lot is allowed.
- Ducks, turkey, fowl and livestock are not allowed.
- Eggs, meat and manure cannot be used for commercial purposed (must only be consumed/used by group or individuals heading the garden).
- Backyard slaughtering is not allowed.
- Hens must be registered with the city. Registration is free and can be done online.

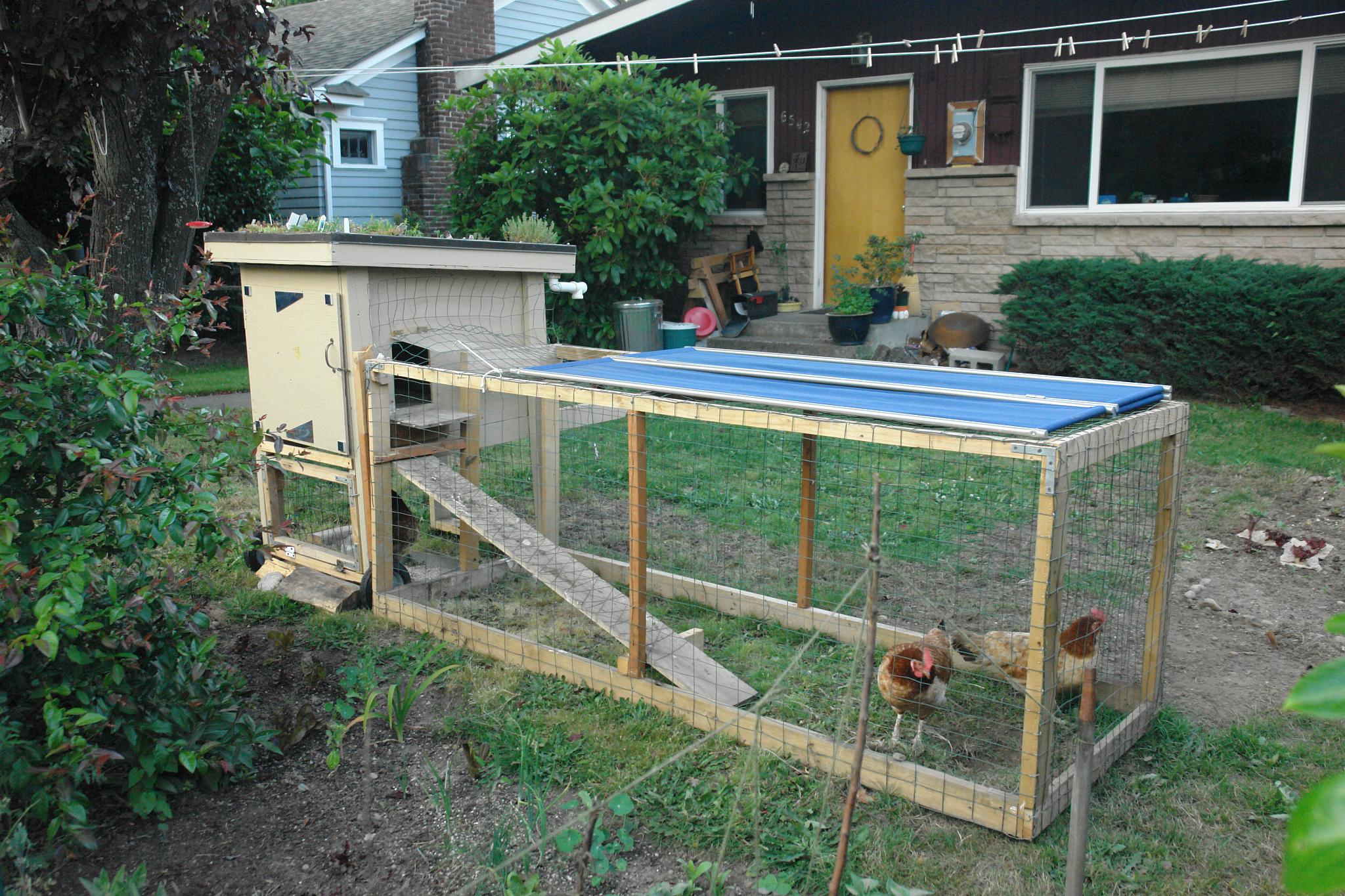
Backyard chicken coop with green roof

=== Honey ===
A number of Vancouver CSAs now involve or specifically focus on beekeeping and honey production. Organizations like Vancouver Honey Bees, Hives for Humanity and Strathcona Beekeepers focus specifically on supplying urban community gardens and community centres with the supplies needed to engage in Urban beekeeping.

=== List of Community Gardens in Vancouver ===
- organized alphabetically

==== Gardens in City Parks ====
Community Gardens in Vancouver City Parks
Name	Location
Adanac Park	Adanac St and Boundary Rd
Beaconsfield Park	East 16th Ave and Slocan St
Brewers Park [approved]	East 26th Ave and Victoria Dr
Cambridge Park (Wall Street)	Cambridge St and Wall St
Cambie Park	500 West 54th Ave
Charleson Park	999 Charleson
China Creek North Park (Means of Production)	East 6th Ave and St Catherines St
China Creek South Park	East 10th Ave and Clark Dr
Cottonwood	Malkin Ave, between Chess & Raymur St
Guelph Park (Brewery Creek)	2390 Brunswick St
Jonathan Rogers Park (Elisabeth Rogers)	West 7th Ave and Manitoba St
Kingcrest Park	East 26th Ave and Knight St
McSpadden Park	East 5th Ave and Victoria Dr
Mount Pleasant Park	West 15th Ave and Ontario St
Nelson Park	1030 Bute St at Nelson St
Pandora Park	East Hastings St and Nanaimo St
Riley Park	East 30 Ave and Ontario St
Riverfront Park	East Kent Ave S and Chandlery Pl
Robson Park	East 14th Ave and Kingsway
Sahali Park	East 8th Ave and Fraser St
Slocan Park [approved]	East 29th Ave and Atlin St
Stanley Park	Robson St at Lost Lagoon
Strathcona	Hawkes Ave and Prior St
Tea Swamp Park	East 15th Ave and Sofia St
Woodland Park	705 Woodland Dr

==== Gardens on City Land ====
City land can include some community centres and personal properties (households/apartment complexes).

Community Gardens on Vancouver City Land
Name	Location
Arbutus Victory	East Blvd, between West 50th to 57th St
Cedar Cottage Community Garden	Under Skytrain near Hull St and Victoria Dr
Chester's Field Community Garden	Chester St and East 37th Ave
Cheyenne	2755 Cheyenne Ave
China Creek Housing	East 8th Aveand Keith St
City Hall Lawn Garden	West 10th Ave and Cambie St
Copley Commons	Copley St and Vanness Ave
CROWS Point Community Garden	Vanness Ave and East 24th Ave
Cypress Community Garden	West 6th Ave and Cypress St
Dundee Community Garden	5395 Dundee St
Horley Community Orchard	2753 Horley St
John McBride Garden	West 1st Ave and Wylie St
Kerrisdale	East Blvd and West 60th Ave
La Cosecha	East Broadway and Clark Dr
Ladybug	East 8th Ave and Commercial Dr
Maple Community Garden	West 6th Ave and Maple St
Means of Production	East 6th Ave and St Catherines St
M.O.B.Y	Commercial Dr and East 11th Ave
Pine	West 6th Ave and Pine St
Horley Community Orchard	2753 Horley St
John McBride Garden	West 1st Ave and Wylie St
Kerrisdale	East Blvd and West 60th Ave
La Cosecha	East Broadway and Clark Dr
Ladybug	East 8th Ave and Commercial Dr
Maple Community Garden	West 6th Ave and Maple St
Means of Production	East 6th Ave and St Catherines St
M.O.B.Y	Commercial Dr and East 11th Ave
Pine	West 6th Ave and Pine St
Purple Thistle Gardens	1200 Parker St,1100 Vernon Dr, and 1100 Charles St
SEFC Community Garden	215 W 1st Ave
SPEC Cambie Communal Garden	West 10th Ave and Cambie St
Still Creek Community Garden	Kaslo St and East 28th Ave
UP! Elgin	East 37th Ave and Elgin St
The Village on False Creek	West 1st Ave and Columbia St
World in a Garden	7249 Cypress St

=== External links ===
Community Supported Agriculture:

- Hives for Humanity: http://hivesforhumanity.com
