= Brian Jungen =

Canadian artist (born 1970)

- Born: April 29, 1970 (age 56); Fort St. John, British Columbia
- Education: Emily Carr Institute of Art and Design
- Known for: contemporary artist
- Awards: 2002 Sobey Art Award; 2010 Iskowitz Prize for visual arts

Brian Jungen (born April 29, 1970 in Fort St. John, British Columbia) is an artist of Dane-zaa and Swiss ancestry living and working in the North Okanagan of British Columbia. Working in a diverse range of two and three-dimensional materials Jungen is widely regarded as a leading member of a new generation of Vancouver artists. While Indigeneity and identity politics have been central to much of his work, Jungen has "a lot of other interests" and themes that run through his oeuvre. His work addresses many audiences' misconception that "native artists are not allowed to do work that is not about First Nations identity", by making poetic artworks that defy categorization.

== Biography ==
Jungen's father was a Swiss immigrant to Canada and met his mother, from the Dane-zaa nation, in the interior of British Columbia. The two married in the 1960s, and as a result, the government took away his mother's Indian status and treaty rights, which, according to the government's Indian Act, could only be determined paternally. Born in 1970 Jungen was raised in the remote logging town of Fort St. John and attended public school where he developed an inclination towards visual art. His parents died in a fire and he was subsequently raised by his Aunt. Jungen moved to Vancouver for his post-secondary education, and graduated from Emily Carr Institute of Art and Design with a Diploma of Visual Art in 1992. Following his post-secondary education Jungen spent time studying art history at Concordia University in Montreal, before moving to New York in 1993. He befriended artist Nicole Eisenmann in New York before returning to Vancouver

In 1997 Jungen participated in the group show Buddy Palace at the OR Gallery in Vancouver. Jungen's contribution was several wall drawings that explored the stereotyped representations of Indigenous peoples and cultures in BC. The wall drawings tried to understand what "people thought native art [was]" by soliciting drawings from people on the street and turning them into large-scale wall drawings. In 1999 Jungen had a solo show at the Charles H. Scott Gallery where he showed more wall drawings and his Prototypes for New Understanding (1998-2005). The exhibition caught the attention of the nation's art journalists, critics, academics and curators", and when the Vancouver Art Gallery purchased several of the sculptures, Jungen's importance and legitimacy was sealed. The Prototypes for New Understanding saw Jungen dismantling Nike Air Jordan sneakers, and reassembling them into forms with a striking resemblance to Northwest coast Indigenous masks. The sculptures poignantly drew a comparison between western material fantasies and the fetishism of the 'other' in settler society.

Prototype for New Understanding #8, 1999 Nike athletic footwear, human hair

In 2000 Jungen had a solo show at the OR Gallery where he mounted Shapeshifter, the first of an eventual three whale skeletons built out of white plastic lawn chairs and suspended in the gallery as if at a natural history museum. The 30' long sculpture pointed to anthropological methods of display, natural resources, commodification and globalization, among numerous other themes that activated the work. The idea of the captive whale was also important to Jungen's thinking as he saw "a parallel to the situation of the First Nations individual who is both marginalized and fetishized by mainstream culture". In the same way that a natural history museum preserves a whale skeleton, a museum of anthropology preserves Indigenous cultural 'artifacts', both institutions presume an "imminent extinction" of their displayed subjects.

In 2002 [Jungen] was awarded the inaugural $50,000 Sobey Art award. In 2004 Jungen installed Court at the exhibition space Triple Candie in New York. The life-size replica of a basketball court, made out of sweatshop sewing machine tables, pointed to globalization, exploitive labor and sports fetishism, and opened up new conceptual possibilities in Jungen's work. In 2005 a retrospective of his work traveled from New York's New Museum to the Vancouver Art Gallery, and Musée d'art contemporain de Montréal. Jungen had an incredibly rapid rise to international fame, which brought with it a rigorous travel schedule; in response Jungen has taken to spending extended periods of time each year "up north, on the Doig River first Nation". His 2010/11 exhibition at Catriona Jefferies incorporated "raw animal hides, which were produced during Jungen's visits up north, where he... started hunting again with his relatives". Jungen has worked with the animal hides in numerous ways including making prints from them and stretching them over car parts and modern furniture "to make some of [his] own drums". Trying to describe the sculpture Tomorrow Repeated, (2011) one journalist said: it is "a moose hide, stretched taut across a pair of metallic green car fenders and trussed in the back with strips of skin, like a corset, the whole thing sits on top of a white freezer – convenient storage for the meat the skin once wrapped". In his own words Jungen said: "people up there, on the reserve, have freezers everywhere, they have car parts everywhere, and they have animal parts everywhere".

In 2012 Jungen collaborated with artist Duane Linklater on the film Modest Livelihood, the hour-long film silently documents the two artists on a hunting trip in Northern British Columbia. The title of the film references the "1999 Supreme Court of Canada decision confirming First Nations' hunting and fishing rights but clarifying their limitation to the earning of a 'moderate livelihood'". The film was shown in Banff in partnership with Documenta 13. Jungen also exhibited in Kassel, Germany as part of Documenta 13's central programming. Jungen's contribution to Documenta was a dog park, made up of "sculptures that [functioned] both as tunnels and platforms for pets, as well as benches for their owners". The park was used by a local dog school offering training "sessions for dogs and [giving] short workshops for visitors on how the equipment in the dog park [could] be used". Also in 2012, Jungen's Prototypes for New Understanding and one of his lawn-chair whale skeletons Cetology represented Vancouver in the Vancouver Pavilion at the Shanghai Biennale.

In 2016 Jungen had shows at both Catriona Jefferies and Casey Kaplan, which saw the artist returning to one of his original materials: Nike sneakers. "The new sculptures [were] entirely different – more open and abstract". The abstract sculptures have a strong modernist sensibility and an understanding of materials that "characterizes so much of Jungen's work". These new shoe "works are less a direct representation and contain more a suggestion of animal and human faces" they confront our desire to "search for and recognize... patterns" by disappointing audiences who may be searching for Jungen's iconic masks.

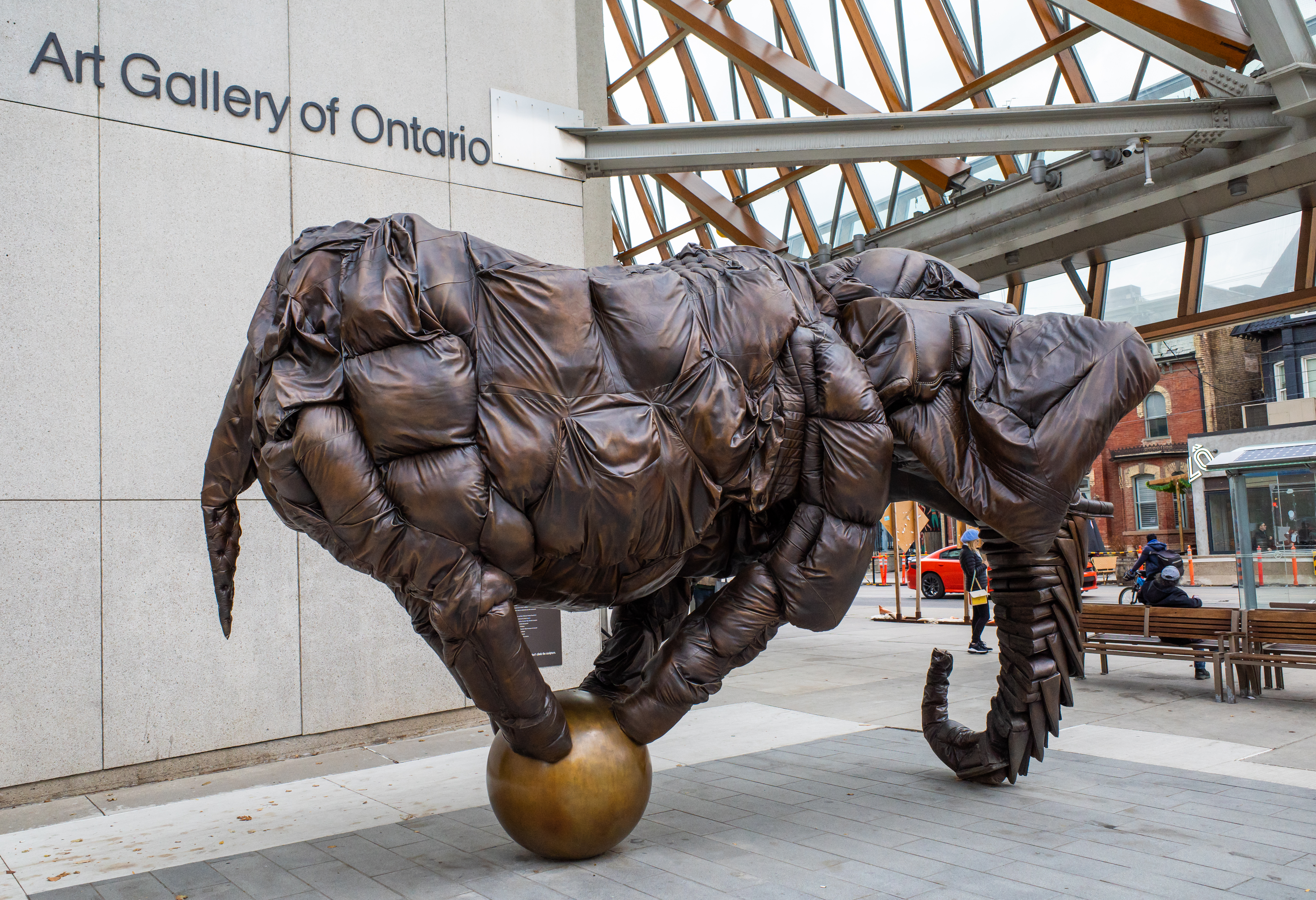
Couch Monster: Sadzěʔ yaaghęhch'ill, 2022. Bronze.

In 2022, the Art Gallery of Ontario unveiled its first public art commission by Jungen titled, Couch Monster: Sadzěʔ yaaghęhch’ill. The Dane-zaa within the title translates to "my heart is ripping". Jungen inspired by the famous large elephant, Jumbo, wanted to convey how there is cruelly in entertainment and art. This public art piece is located in downtown Toronto at the corner of Dundas and McCaul where Henry Moore's Large Two Forms (1966-1969) once resided from 1974-2017. Couch Monster is Jungen's first installation in bronze. There is a duality with this piece in that it can be seen both as whimsical and sad. Constructed out of pieces of couch materials the sculpture is covered in different textures and is made to be touched.

== Themes ==
Throughout his career Jungen has created poetic artworks which explore a diversity of themes through their openness to multiple interpretations and have "resisted the trap of racial pigeon-holing". Jungen's work makes "connections between his First Nations ancestry, Western art history and the global economy". His breakout series Prototypes for New Understanding was loaded with enough clues to "[allow] writers to connect the dots between globalization, Nike's Third World sweatshops, and Canada's institutionalized" colonial racism. Several themes have been consistently pursued throughout his career including museology, consumerism/ globalization, identity politics and animals.

=== Museology ===
From the early Prototypes for New Understanding (displayed in Plexiglas vitrines) through to more recent sculptures (using freezers as plinths), methods of display have been central to the aesthetic and conceptual success of Jungen's work. Canada's Indian Act of 1876 encompassed a Potlatch ban; the government implemented this ban by seizing much of the material culture (masks, blankets, baskets, etc....) that were central to Potlatches. The confiscated 'culture' has subsequently been displayed in museums of anthropology; as Jungen says: "a lot of my exposure to my ancestry is through museums". Jungen realized the significance of 'display' to the colonial ideology and the way that museums of anthropology have historicized and "mythologized" Indigenous culture as a way of maintaining colonial domination. Fully aware of the colonial motives of anthropological display, it was coincidence that Jungen "went into Nike Town [where] they had sneakers of theirs in glass vitrines". Jungen conflated these two experiences of museology in his Prototypes for New Understanding by presenting his Northwest Coast inspired masks made of Nike Air Jordan sneakers "as if they were anthropological artifacts – on metal armatures inside plexi-glass vitrines"; thus tapping into the 'mythologizing' effect that the vitrine has had on both sneakers and Indigenous material culture.

Jungen again invoked museology in his sculpture Shapeshifter (2000) where he transformed plastic lawn chairs into the form of a whale skeleton and hung it as if it were a "display found in natural history museums or public aquarium". The display of whales in museums and aquariums is like a "parallel to the situation of the First Nations individual who is both marginalized and fetishized" in settler society. Through their own methods of display, Jungen's sculptures point to "the values that modes of display bestow upon an object".

=== Consumerism and globalization ===
The manipulation of consumer products has been central to Jungen's practice and additionally, his use of "the raw materials of economic production" has been key tools for Jungen to address consumerism and globalization. In 2001 Jungen produced Untitled, which was a stack of wooden pallets "displayed in a seemingly random pile, the way pallets might be found at the edge of a loading bay". Upon closer examination the pallets reveal themselves to be "painstakingly handcrafted by the artist from red cedar (the wood most commonly used by Northwest Coast Aboriginal carvers)". The pallet, as a fundamental tool for the mass movement of goods and commodities, becomes a symbol of globalization. Yet, in Jungen's hands, the pallets become fetishized items of craftsmanship; that transformation is almost the opposite of Nike sneakers, which are produced under the sweatshop conditions of globalization, and transformed by the market into consumer fetishes.

In 2004 Jungen produced Court, a monumental sculpture made of "231 wood veneer sweatshop [sewing] tables, sourced from a secondhand broker in New Jersey", and arranged into a scale replica of a basketball court. Made up of sweatshop tables, Jungen's court had hundreds of holes where sewing machines would have sat. This treacherous court makes an uneasy connection between the millionaire athletes, who play on such courts, in shoes made on sweatshop tables like the ones Jungen's court is made of. The uncomfortable exploitive conditions of globalization are a theme that runs through Jungen's work.

Jungen is interested in commodities, often transforming prefabricated materials (such as baseball bats, chairs, shoes, gasoline cans...) into sculptures. As Jungen says: "I like using things people can recognize and that they see around them everyday". His most iconic series Prototypes for New Understanding, complicate the relationship between economic and cultural values. The Nike shoes being of economic value and the Northwest Coast masks Jungen's sculptures reference being of cultural value; Jungen's sculptural transformation makes the connections "between the commodification of those shoes, and the same thing that has happened to native art". Amidst the capitalist settler desire to understand and demystify Indigenous culture they have transformed Indigenous "heritage into capital". Jungen has continued to explore the fetishistic nature of commodities and their relationships to Indigeneity. His 2011 sculpture Tomorrow Repeated takes "the ultimate consumer fetish object, the car," and stretches over it a moose hide. This sculpture is again an example of Jungen exploring the territory between commodity and culture, and merging the settler fetishism of Indigenous imagery with the commodity fetishism of the car.

=== Identity politics ===
Jungen's personal heritage as Dane-zaa, and living in the settler colonial state of Canada, have proved to be fruitful inspiration for much of his practice, as he "works the seam between native and white cultures". Jungen's art often calls into question the "stereotypical representations of Aboriginal culture" and the colonial "ambition to assimilate native art". As Jungen states: "I was interested in the ubiquitousness of native motifs, especially in Vancouver, and how they have been corrupted and applied and assimilated commercially". Jungen's "art unfolds against [this] global context of colonial stereotyping", and he often plays-up that stereotyping by "appropriating imagery from nations that are not his own" (Milroy, 2006). His Prototypes for New Understanding, for example, are evocative of mask designs from coastal nations of BC including the Haida, Kwakwaka'waka, and Bella Coola nations. Being from the Dane-zaa nation in the provincial interior, Jungen's masks appropriate the designs of coastal nations; in the same way that Indigenous coastal motifs have been co-opted by settlers and "come to be associated with the whole province". Jungen again points to the formation of a generic 'Indigenous' identity that ignores distinctions between nations, by making Furniture Sculpture (2006), a Teepee built of leather stripped off sofas. Teepees have become a generic symbol for 'Indianness', when in fact they are very specific to Plains nations. Thus, Jungen's teepee promoted one journalist to ask: "what is he doing erecting a teepee if not to provoke such essentialist presumptions about his ethnicity?".

In Canada's British Columbia, imagery of Northwest coast First Nations have been "commercialized", and mythologized into the branding of the Province itself as 'supernatural British Columbia'. Indigenous imagery and "iconography" has been "sewn into the public consciousness" in an almost unconscious yet predictable fashion. This 'predictability' has been explored in some of Jungen's most recent sculptures in 2016. Returning to the medium of Nike sneakers these more recent sculptures are more abstract, some contain hints of reference to masks or animals, but are largely unrecognizable. Given the formal and conceptual success of Jungen's previous Nike sneaker sculptures, these new abstractions reject audiences' expectation of them as masks, instead, they refuse our "desire for meaning". Given the strong desire by settlers to understand, and therefore assimilate, Indigenous culture these new sculptures consciously refute the stereotypes of Indigenous imagery (stereotypes which his earlier Prototype for New Understanding critically embraced) and reflect the 'desire to understand' back to settlers.

=== Animals ===
Animals have consistently appeared in Jungen's work. Sometimes as a subject matter, as when he constructed a seeming whale skeleton in Shapeshifter (2000) from articulated plastic chairs. And sometimes as a material, both living and not; his use of various animal hides, and also using live animals as he did with cats in Habitat 04: Cite radieuse des chats/ Cats radiant city (2004). Habitat 04: Cite radieuse des chats/ Cats radiant city was a temporary habitat for homeless cats, which Jungen built to mimic the iconic Moshe Safdie designed building 'Habitat' in Montreal for Expo 67. Jungen's "fascination with animals" often circles back to questions around the domestication of pets and the "environments built for animals" such as at aquariums or zoos. For his 2005 project Inside Today's Home Jungen Reconfigured materials purchased at IKEA to created an "indoor aviary for six domesticated zebra finches". So as not to disturb the birds, viewers were only able to see them and the structures through peepholes in the gallery walls, thus exaggerating voyeuristic tendencies toward animals. Jungen's interest in animals in captivity is a parallel between the voyeuristic way in which audiences look at captive animals and the way audiences look at Indigenous material culture.

== Artistic approach ==
Jungen's art draws upon the tradition of found object art, espoused by such twentieth-century artists as Andy Warhol and Marcel Duchamp. Instead of presenting objects "as-is," however, Jungen often reworks them without fully concealing their original meaning or purpose. For instance, Jungen's series Prototypes of New Understanding (1998-2005) consists of Indigenous masks assembled and hand-sewn from parts of Nike Air Jordan shoes. Jungen writes: "It was interesting to see how by simply manipulating the Air Jordan shoes you could evoke specific cultural traditions whilst simultaneously amplifying the process of cultural corruption and assimilation. The Nike mask sculptures seemed to articulate a paradoxical relationship between a consumerist artefact and an 'authentic' native artefact."

The Nike footwear Jungen employed incorporates in their unmodified forms colours similar to traditional First Nations artwork and wood carvings: red and black. However, other projects, such as a series of wooden pallets, painstakingly crafted from red cedar, a First Nations tent made out of "11 leather couches" and Jungen's large "whale-bone" sculptures made out of plastic chairs (some still with Canadian Tire price stickers on them) seek to defamiliarize even members of Western society that are unfamiliar with First Nation themes by placing familiar objects in unfamiliar positions or situations and vice versa.

Yet other projects, such as Jungen's "Isolated Depiction of the Passage of Time," are more political. In this specific example, the plastic food trays are colour-coded to match the statistics of jail sentences given to First Nations individuals, while (inspired by a prison-break exhibit Jungen once saw), the inner part of the sculpture conceals a television and a DVD player, quietly playing the film The Great Escape from the inside.

In 2004, he participated in A Grain of Dust A Drop of Water: The 5th Gwangju Biennale in Gwangju, Korea. An exhibition of Jungen's work was held at the Vancouver Art Gallery (Canada) from January 28 to April 30, 2006. Later that year he also held an exhibition at the Tate Modern from May 20 to July 9, 2006. In 2008 he participated in the Sydney Biennale exhibiting his installation entitled Crux.

Jungen is the first living Native American artist to exhibit at the Smithsonian's National Museum of the American Indian (NMAI) in Washington, D.C., with his survey exhibition entitled "Strange Comfort" that was on view from October 16, 2009, to August 8, 2010. Jungen won the 2010 Iskowitz Prize for visual arts.

In 2011, Jungen unveiled three public sculptures at the Banff Centre entitled The ghosts on top of my head, consisting of white powder-coated steel benches, each in the shape of an antler from an elk, moose, and caribou.

His sculpture titled Carapace was inspired by Jules Verne's mythical giant animals and was exhibited in Loire Valley, where Jules Verne is from. It was also shown at the Art Gallery of Alberta in Edmonton in 2011. He grew up in an isolated community in the Peace River area in credits this with stimulating his creativity.

== Major collections ==
Jungen's work is in the National Gallery of Canada's permanent collection of contemporary artists. Shapeshifter (2000) was acquired in 2001; Star/Pointro (2011) was acquired in 2011; Court (2004) was acquired in 2012; and People's Flag (2006) in 2014.
