= Tʼuyʼtʼtanat-Cease Wyss =

First Nations ethnobotanist and artist from British Columbia

Tʼuyʼtʼtanat Cease Wyss
- Tʼuyʼtʼtanat
- Born: Cease Wyss
- Citizenship: Squamish Nation and Canada
- Known for: Ethnobotany, interdisciplinary art, permaculture
- Notable work: x̱aw̓s shew̓áy̓ New Growth «新生林»
- Children: Senaqwila Wyss
- Mother: Kultsia-t Barbara Wyss
- Awards: honorary doctorate, Emily Carr University (2022), VIVA Award, Emily Carr University (2024)
- Website: tuyttanatceasewyss.ca

Tʼuyʼtʼtanat-Cease Wyss is a Skwxwú7mesh (Squamish) interdisciplinary artist, politician, ethnobotanist, and educator based in Vancouver, British Columbia. Also of Stó:lō, Kānaka Maoli (Hawaiian), Irish-Métis, and Swiss descent, she is an independent curator, activist, and small business owner.

Wyss's interdisciplinary practice encompasses aspects of visual art, fiber arts, ethnobotany, storytelling, and community education, among other interdisciplinary approaches. She has been working with new media, performance, and interdisciplinary arts for more than 30 years. As a Coast Salish weaver, Wyss works with wool and cedar, and uses indigenous plants in the dyeing process. Wyss also engages with beekeeping and gardening practices as part of community-led initiatives and as a way to explore aspects of land remediation - the ability of plants to remediate soil that has been contaminated with colonial toxins.

Wyss is a member of the Aboriginal Writers Collective West Coast and owns Raven and Hummingbird Tea Co. with her daughter Senaqwila Wyss. She is also a beekeeper.

She designed the Indigenous Plant Garden at the Museum of Vancouver.

Wyss was elected as a Park Board Commissioner in the 2026 Vancouver municipal election and took office on November 2.

== Name ==
Tʼuyʼtʼtanat is Wyss's ancestral name, which means “woman who travels by canoe to gather medicines for all people.”

== Early life ==
Cease Wyss grew up in British Columbia. Wyss' grandmother wove cedar root baskets from age five to her death at age 64 and had ten children. Wyss' mother Kultsia-t Barbara Wyss (Skwxwú7mesh/Hawaiian) was a residential school survivor.

She studied basketweaving with Skwxwú7mesh master weavers Alice Guss (Tsawayia Spukwus) and Ed Eugene Carriere.

== Selected exhibitions and works ==
Wyss has participated in large-scale public art exhibition festivals, museums, galleries, and artist-run spaces. This includes the 2017 Vancouver Queer Arts Festival and the 2016 Vancouver Biennale. Wyss was a participating artist and led educational programming in these events.

=== Transits and Returns, Vancouver Art Gallery (2019–2020) ===
This exhibition was co-curated by Tarah Hogue, Lana Lopesi, Sarah Biscarra Dilley, Freja Carmichael, and Léuli Eshrāghi. It presented the work of 21 Indigenous artists whose practices are rooted in both the specificities of their cultures and via their travels. Wyss's contribution was a 2018 work titled Shḵwen̓ Wéw̓ shḵem Nexw7iy̓ay̓ulh (To Explore, To Travel by Canoe). The sculptural installation consists of a ceremonial cape, photographs, and materials such as Lauhala, coconut hull fiber, seagrass, red cedar bark, wool, abalone shell, and mother of pearl buttons that are used by makers from the Sḵwx̱wú7mesh (Squamish) and Hawaiian territories.

=== x̱aw̓s shew̓áy̓ New Growth «新生林», 221A Semi-Public 半公開 (2019–2020) ===
This site-specific work was produced during Wyss's 14-month fellowship with 221A art space, based in Vancouver, British Columbia. An empty lot at 271 Union Street was transformed into a Pacific Northwest Coast rain forest garden containing flora representing the local biodiversity that can be found across the traditional and unceded lands of the Skwxwú7mesh (Squamish), Musqueam and Tsleil-Waututh Nations. Different types of berries and shrubs, such as ocean spray, oso berry and kinnikinnick, and flowers, such as yarrow, wood sorrel, and wild rose were planted. The project is based on permaculture movements, which explore the inter-connectivity of different forms of life within a particular ecosystem, and showcased an understanding of the holistic interconnectedness that is represented in Indigenous knowledge systems, in this case, traditional Coast Salish ways of knowing. An ongoing element of the installation is that the space is recorded by cameras 24 hours a day and the live recording can be accessed online via the Semi-Public website.

=== Spill: Response, Morris and Helen Belkin Art Gallery (2019) ===
Curated by Guadalupe Martinez, Spill: Response, was a live research performance component of the exhibition titled Spill at the Belkin Art Gallery in Vancouver, British Columbia. Spill: Response brought together artists, performance artists, and educators, including Tʼuyʼtʼtanat-Cease Wyss, Anne Riley, Nelly César and Maria Thereza Alves to present their research through a series of workshops hosted by the gallery.

=== A Constellation of Remediation (2017–2019) ===
A Constellation of Remediation was a collaborative two-year, site-specific public art project situated on vacant and untended lots throughout Vancouver. Wyss and Anne Riley planted Indigenous remediation gardens on specific sites based on decolonization work near locations through the Native Education College (NEC), Urban Native Youth Association (UNYA), and the Wild Salmon Caravan Residency and Working Group on Indigenous Food Sovereignty. The process involved communication with developers and Parks and Recreation staff from the City of Vancouver, as well as the public, to build connections and shift consciousness and awareness of bioremediation, land stewardship, and reconciliation.

=== #callresponse (2016) ===
Co-organized by Tarah Hogue, Maria Hupfield and Tania Willard, this exhibition addressed five projects commissioned by Indigenous artists based across Canada and the United States. Participating artists were selected for their diverse work in engaging with community through practices ranging from performance to ceremony to new media. A publication was developed with Christi Belcourt, Tarah Hogue, Maria Hupfield, Karyn Recollet, Eve Tuck, and Aseman Sabet.

=== Talking Poles, public art installation (2009) ===
Talking Poles commemorated a community dialogue project led by Wyss, Lorna Boschman, and Victoria Moulder in 2009. Two poles standing 4.2 meters high were installed on both sides of the City of Surrey Serpentine Greenway path. The poles, which were created as part of a collaborative effort, depict words written in the many languages spoken by the community and allude to the role of the talking stick in Indigenous oral traditions.

== Selected publications ==
=== Writing ===
Journey to Kahoʻolawe documents the recovery and remediation of sacred land on the Hawaiian island of Kahoʻolawe which had previously been occupied by American forces. Histories of migration are explored, by detailing the migratory journey of the Kanaka family to the Pacific Northwest Coast, as well as Indigenous Hawaiian and Squamish communities.

=== Illustration ===
Squamish People of the Sunset Coast explores many different sources to relay the history and cultural traditions of the Squamish people through the lens of two specific stories: "The Two Sisters" and "Mink and His Brother."

== Filmography and media ==
Year	Title
1993	All good medicine: Kon-a-wai Kloshe La-mes-tin
1995	Ten Skakel (My baby)
2008	Indigenous Plant Diva by Kamala Todd
2010	Future ancestors
2012	Kultsia: the art of the apology
2012	The ancestors are speaking: we are not listening
2017	Bridging the Gap Between Modern and Ancient Medicines, TedX Talk
2020	Cease Wyss - Cultural Crossings, The Polygon Gallery
2020	The Polygon Podcast: Episode 7 Featuring Cease and Senaqwila Wyss

== Awards and honors ==
- 2010 recipient of the City of Vancouver Mayor's Arts Award for film and new media.
- 2020 recorded as an artist by The National Gallery of Canada.
- 2022 honorary doctorate by Emily Carr University
- 2024 recipient of The Jack and Doris Shadbolt Foundation VIVA Award.

Wyss has participated in the Indigenous Storyteller in Residence at the Vancouver Public Library (2018). and was an artist-in-residence (2017) with Leigh Tennant, at Griffin Art Projects in North Vancouver, British Columbia.
