= Anne Riley =

American artist

- Born: Dallas, Texas, U.S.
- Education: University of Texas at Austin (BFA); Native Education College
- Occupation: Artist

Anne Riley is an interdisciplinary artist of Slavey Dene (Fort Nelson First Nation) and German ancestry. Born in Dallas, Texas, Riley currently lives and works in Vancouver, Canada. Several of Riley's works derive from her identity as Indigiqueer, a term coined by Cree artist TJ Cuthand, and commonly used by Indigenous artists including Oji-Cree storyteller, Joshua Whitehead. The term is interconnected with Two-spirit, an identity and role that continues to be vital within and across many Indigenous nations. Through artistic projects, Riley engages Indigenous methodologies that prioritize learning through embodiment, nurturing communities as well as the non-human world. Riley received her BFA from the University of Texas at Austin in 2012. Riley is a recipient of the City of Vancouver Studio Award (2018–2021).

== Selected works and projects ==
From 2021 to 2022, Riley collaborated with artists Nadia Lichtig, Josèfa Ntjam, Jol Thoms, as well as physicists, chemists and engineers from SNOLAB on the exhibition Drift: Art and Dark Matter. The project was conceived as both residency and exhibition, and has exhibited at the Agnes Etherington Art Centre, Morris and Helen Belkin Art Gallery and the Carleton University Art Gallery.

From 2017 to 2019, Riley and her collaborator, T’uy’t’tanat-Cease Wyss, worked on a public art project, A Constellation of Remediation, commissioned by the City of Vancouver. The project consisted of planting Indigenous remediation gardens on vacant gas station lots throughout the city as a way of decolonizing and healing the soil.

For the exhibition Every Little Bit Hurts, at the Western Front Society in Vancouver in 2015, Riley created an installation titled that brings the other nearly as close as oneself. It consisted of a sculpture, made of 62 plaster molds of replicas of Riley's hands holding each other, and two sets of blue drawings on the wall of the art gallery. Those drawings were created as a remnant of Riley's performance, which was documented on video and also exhibited at the exhibition.

In 2015, Riley attended the Time_Place_Space: Nomad residency program in Melbourne, Australia. There, Riley expanded her scope of art practice to performance and examined experiences of silence as gestures of resilience.

== Exhibitions ==
Riley's artworks often refer to Indigenous people's experiences, decolonization of Indigenous and women bodies, two-spirits, and healing of land and people from traumatic experiences.

Exhibitions include:

- 2021: Drift: Art and Dark Matter at Morris and Helen Belkin Art Gallery, Vancouver, British Columbia.
- 2020: Her words are Not Vanishing as she leaves her howl inside us at ArtSpeak, Vancouver, British Columbia.
- 2019: Spill at Morris and Helen Belkin Art Gallery, Vancouver, British Columbia. As a part of this exhibition, Riley and T’uy’t’tanat-Cease Wyss offered a workshop at UBC farm to demonstrate their project A Constellation of Remediation.
- 2019: This Land is Lonely for Us at Satellite Gallery, Banff Centre for Arts and Creativity, Banff, Alberta
- 2018: If the river ran upwards at Walter Phillips Gallery, Banff, Alberta
- 2017: Pōuliuli, West Space, Melbourne, Australia
- 2015: Every Little Bit Hurts at Western Front, Vancouver, British Columbia
- 2014: 600 Campbell at Contemporary Art Gallery, Vancouver, British Columbia
- 2012: Head Curator for the show, Now What It Never Was at the Visual Arts Center at The University of Texas at Austin.

== Published texts ==
- Anne Riley, líndline (Where Rivers Meet), “ALMANAC” edited by Maggie Groat published by Kitchener Waterloo Art Gallery.
- Anne Riley, Įladzeeé: Pulse in the Wrist: Indigeneity and the Work of Emotional Labour, 2016, MICE Magazine.
- Anne Riley, Canada Council For the Arts Spotlight Post, Time_Place_Space : Nomad; Silence as Resilience, 2016.

== Grants and awards ==
- 2018–2021: City of Vancouver Studio Award Recipient
- 2017: British Columbia Arts Council Grant for Professional Development (Advanced Mentorship with Interdisciplinary artist Laiwan)
- 2016: Canada Council for the Arts International Artist Residency Grant (NYC, Alma De Mujer Center for Social Change, Austin, TX)
- 2015: Canada Council for the Arts Inter-Arts Residency Grant (Melbourne, Australia, TPS: Nomad Residency)
- 2014: British Columbia Arts Council Grant for Professional Development (Mentorship with Interdisciplinary artist Laiwan)
