= Black Salt Collective =

American artist collective

Black Salt Collective is an American queer, women-of-color artist collective that currently consists of four California-based artists and curators: Sarah Biscarra-Dilley, Grace Rosario Perkins, Anna Luisa Petrisko, and Adee Roberson. Founded in 2012, Black Salt Collective's art practice crosses disciplines and media, including performance, video, installation, sound, painting, collage, textiles, sculpture, and printmaking.

== History ==
Founding member Anna Luisa Petrisko has explained that, among other commonalities, the group's members "all make artwork with the intention of healing. Healing ourselves, healing our communities, healing the past and healing the future." The group is known for expanding narratives of art practice and art history beyond male, Eurocentric points of view.

As an artist collective, Black Salt Collective has exhibited at Artists’ Television Access, the San Francisco Public Library (as part of the Radar Reading Series), Verge Center for the Arts, MIX Festival, Outsider Festival, and Glitch Festival Australia. Black Salt Collective was a recipient of a Southern Exposure grant in 2013. In 2016 Black Salt Collective participated in the Artist in Residence Program at Facebook. As a curatorial collective, Black Salt Collective has held a curatorial residency at SOMArts (2016) resulting in the exhibition "Visions into Infinite Archives." They have spoken at the Open Engagement conference (2016), the University of California, Santa Barbara, and Occidental College (2017).

== Projects and exhibitions ==
=== Visions Into Infinite Archives ===
Black Salt Collective's curatorial residency opened in January 2016 in SOMArt's Main Gallery with the exhibition “Visions Into Infinite Archives.” featured 30 artists and filmmakers of color. The exhibition has been described as "energetically showcasing" a wide spectrum of artists of color engaging in equally varied disciplinary and conceptual approaches" while also " putting elements of their ancestry in dialogue with their lived experiences through inventive juxtapositions, many offering visions of utopian futures." The work in this exhibition "consists of indigenous-themed large-scale day-glow paintings, paper mâché masks with contorted features and varying expressions, performance-based videos and collages which adorn the walls."

=== Space and Place ===
A multimedia exhibition featuring images and video of the Black Salt Collective members singing and dancing in the confines of a room. This was shown at the Verge Center for the Arts in Sacramento in 2018.
