= Grace Rosario Perkins =

American artist

- Born: 1986 (age 39–40); Santa Fe, New Mexico
- Citizenship: American
- Education: Mills College at Northeastern University
- Website: http://www.gracerosarioperkins.com/

Grace Rosario Perkins (b. 1986) is a multidisciplinary artist whose works explore the intersections of her Native American, queer and gender identities. She currently lives and works in Albuquerque, New Mexico. Although she is primarily a painter, Perkins also creates in other mediums, including video installations and masks. Perkins has been nominated for a San Francisco Museum of Modern Art (SFMoMA) Society for the Encouragement of Contemporary Art Award, a United States Arts Fellowship, a Tosa Studio Award, and a Liquitex Painter’s Residency. As well as her solo work, Perkins is a member of the Black Salt Collective.

== Early life and education ==
Perkins was born in Santa Fe, New Mexico, in 1986. Her mother is Diné, and her father is Akimel O’odham from the Gila River Indian Community. Perkins was raised in Oakland, around the Gila River, and in the Navajo Nation. Perkins received her General Education Development (GED) certificate before studying Art History at Mills College at Northeastern University, in Oakland.

== Career ==
=== Artistic practice ===
There was a comic book store beside Perkins’s high school, and she was inspired by the books she read there to make art for herself. Several members of Perkins’s family are artists themselves, including her father, Olen Perkins, and her uncle, Michael McCabe. McCabe runs the Santa Fe printmaking shop, Fourth Dimension Studios. Perkins credits McCabe with introducing her to lithography. McCabe also introduced Perkins to Salish artist Jaune Quick-to-See Smith and Southern Cheynne artist Edgar Heap of Birds. Perkins’s current artistic practice is heavily influenced by the Native American artists who came before her and by her own Diné/Akimel O’odham ancestry. In a 2017 interview for Nat. Brut, Perkins explained that her paintings are inspired by her grandmother’s experience growing up in a hogan and at boarding schools. Additionally, Perkins includes Navajo (or Diné) in her works, like in Cheii Knew We Were in the White World, a painting from 2022. Cheii is the Navajo word for "grandpa". About the incorporation of Navajo in her work, Perkins has said that non-Native American people are "unwilling ‘to go deeper to get it.’" Perkins’s work continues to explore access to and preservation of Native American languages.

Perkins works from a do-it-yourself (DIY) approach. As she puts it, "a lot of my work is really thrown together. I work with really crude materials... pretty much just anything that I can get my hands on that's inexpensive and accessible." Out of this DIY approach comes Perkins’s signature masks, made out of papier-mâche and chicken-wire. Vision (2013) is the first mask that Perkins ever made. This mask has the word "Vision" carved into the forehead. According to Perkins, the mask speaks to the importance of visions in Native American cultures.

=== Teaching ===
Perkins worked at a series of non-profit organizations for disabled artists, like the NIAD Art Centre, around the same time as she was studying at Mills College. Perkins is quoted as saying, "That's kind of where I got away from the preciousness of making and its product and started focusing more on the process and experimentation." Since that time, Perkins has also taught at her alma mater, Mills College.

Additionally, Perkins has presented on a number of panels, both on her own and as a member of the Black Salt Collective. In 2017, Perkins was invited to be a part of a conference called, "CROSSROADS: ART + NATIVE FEMINISMS", at the Museum of Arts and Design (MAD) in New York City. Perkins’s panel was titled, "The Problematics of Making Art While Native and Female."

=== Residencies ===
In 2017, Perkins was granted an artist’s residency at Artists’ Cooperative Residency & Exhibitions (ACRE), which is designed specifically for new and emerging artists. Perkins has also been in residence at White Leaves, the Sedona Summer Colony, and Varda Artists’ Residency. Additionally, from 2018 to 2019, Perkins was the Print Public Artist-in-Residence at the Kala Art Institute in Berkeley, California. The residency is focused on the role of public art in city planning. As a part of this residency, Perkins produced Sight Sound (2019), an acrylic and spray paint work that is currently housed at the Kala Art Institute.

=== Exhibitions ===
==== 2014: Thin Leather ====
Perkins and her father, Olen Perkins, collaborated on 20 paintings for their exhibit, Thin Leather. Their collaborative practice was as follows: Perkins mailed her father an artwork, he added to the canvas, sent it back, and the process continued until they decided the painting was finished. This exhibit was named after Olen’s grandfather, and Grace Rosario’s great-grandfather, Thin Leather.

==== 2018: Material Futurity ====
Perkins’s work was exhibited as part of the Material Futurity group show at the Law Warschaw Gallery at Macalester College in Saint Paul, Minnesota.

==== 2019: Let's talk about sex, bb ====
Running Towards the Sun, an acrylic and spray paint piece, was exhibited as part of Let’s talk about sex, bb at The Agnes Etherington Art Centre at Queen's University in Kingston, Ontario. Running Towards the Sun has also been displayed at the Jack Barrett (formerly 315 Gallery) in New York City.

==== 2019: Foucault on Acid ====
Perkins’s work was displayed as part of the Foucault on Acid exhibit at the ONE National Gay and Lesbian Archives in Los Angeles. In 1975, French philosopher Michel Foucault and American artist Simeon Wade took a trip to Death Valley, California. Foucault on Acid pairs the writing that came out of that trip with Perkins’s paintings.

==== 2 April - 16 October 2022: The Relevance of Your Data ====
Perkins’s first individual show, The Relevance of Your Data, was mounted at the Museum of Contemporary Art (MOCA) in Tucson, Arizona. The Relevance of Your Data included 8 paintings made specifically for this exhibition, including the mixed-media work, Mom Jokes to Make Her Hair Curly Like a Sheep (2022). The exhibition addressed the collection of personal data and the harms that this practice imposes on people of colour, in particular. Perkins’s practice is highly collaborative, and she is known for sharing the arts spaces she is offered with other artists of colour. For this exhibition, Perkins invited contributions from Lonnie Holley, Fox Maxy, Eric-Paul Riege, and her father, Olen Perkins.

As is characteristic of Perkins’s DIY style, her paintings from The Relevance of Your Data incorporate found objects and text. In an interview with Sara Wintz, Perkins explained that she likes "to think of hidden text as sets of intentions for a painting, or where [she is] at in life." Some of this text is in English, and some is in Navajo. Through the inclusion of Navajo and objects from her personal life, Perkins seeks to challenge stereotypical portrayals of Native American peoples. As she says, "we’re seen as monolithic: one…. I really hope that, though, in being contemporary, we can inhabit that space in a way that feels really open-ended." In a review of The Relevance of Your Data for Hyperallergic, Lynn Trimble dubbed Perkins "one of the Southwest’s most exciting emerging artists" for her work on the representation of Native American queer women of colour.

==== 26 August - 29 October 2022: With or Without You: America ====
Perkins’s work was exhibited as part of the With or Without You: America group show at Temple Contemporary at Temple University in Philadelphia. The exhibit was inspired by James Baldwin’s 1955 essay collection, Notes of a Native Son, and addressed the experience of first-generation Americans. Perkins’s Black Salt Collective co-founder, Adee Roberson, was also a part of this show.

==== 10 September - 29 October 2022: Hermit's Lamp ====
Perkins’s second individual show, Hermit’s Lamp, was exhibited at Cushion Works in San Francisco. The show included 7 new works, including Cheii Knew We Were in the White World (2022) and Forgiveness (2022). These works exemplify Perkins’s DIY style. Forgiveness, for example, includes found objects like a bumper sticker and bingo cards. Similarly, Cheii Knew We Were in the White World incorporates a family photo of Perkins and her cousins, as well as a necklace that says, "Girls".

==== 18 October 2025 – 8 February 2026: Grace Rosario Perkins: Circles, Spokes, Zigzags, Rivers ====
The Whitney Museum of American Art presented an exhibition “ten recent works—primarily large-scale paintings made between 2022 and the present, including two paintings created specially for this exhibition, as well as a new sculpture.” This was Perkin first solo museum exhibition in New York City.

=== In print ===
Perkins released her debut book of paintings, Five Fingered Being, in 2018. Perkins also contributed to the 2018 collection, Demand Utopian Sports.

== Work as part of the Black Salt Collective ==
The Black Salt Collective was formed in 2012 as an all-queer, all-BIPOC (Black, Indigenous, and People of Colour) group. Its members include Perkins, Adee Roberson, Sarah Biscarra-Dilley, and Anna Luisa Petrisko. Founding member Fanciulla Gentile has left the group.

One the Collective’s first projects involved a roadtrip to visit Perkins’s family members throughout the Southwest. The group made video and visual art—a series that would eventually be called "The Initiation"—throughout.

In 2016, the Collective curated their first exhibition, Visions Into Infinite Archives, at SOMArts Cultural Centre in San Francisco. Perkins’s contributions to the exhibition include Vision, as well as other masks, paintings, and prints. As Perkins says, "so many artists of color, or queer artists of color, or queer artists or anyone who is on the periphery of museum culture is put or displayed in this very specific way where it's very didactic." Like the Collective itself, Visions Into Infinite Archives seeks to challenge the marginalisation of queer, BIPOC artists, and the traditional, "‘didactic’" way in which their works are often displayed.

In 2018, the members of the Black Salt Collective were invited to curate an exhibition at the Verge Center for the Arts in Sacramento, California. This exhibition was called Space and Place. In their artists’ statement, the Collective members wrote, "When inhabiting SPACE, we reflect on relationship(s) to settler colonialism and its ongoing implications." This show demonstrated how creative, collaborative pursuits help the artists navigate settler colonialism.
