= Lorelei Williams =

Canadian indigenous activist (born 1980)

- Born: Palexelsiya Lorelei Williams; 1980 (age 45–46); Vancouver, British Columbia, Canada
- Education: Native Education College
- Occupation: Activist for Missing and Murdered Indigenous Women
- Years active: 2011–present
- Employer: Butterflies in Spirit

Palexelsiya Lorelei Williams (born 1980) is a Canadian human rights activist. A member of the Skatin and Stsʼailes nations, she is known for her public campaigns for justice for missing and murdered indigenous women, including her aunt and cousin.

== Early life and education ==
Williams was born and raised in Vancouver, British Columbia. She is member of the Skatin and Stsʼailes First Nations. Williams' mother was from a reservation, and was sent to an Indian residential school; not wanting her children to experience the same abuse and trauma she did, Williams' mother moved to Vancouver to raise her children. One of four children, Williams helped raise her siblings due to their mother's alcoholism. Williams went on to have two children of her own.

Williams studied tourism management at university, and in 2001 spent six months working at an internship at a hotel in Japan, where she learned Japanese. She later went on to study aboriginal justice at Native Education College.

== Activism ==
In 1977, before her birth, Williams' aunt Belinda went missing from Downtown Eastside, a neighbourhood in Vancouver. Local police refused to open a missing person case for her until 2004, following the arrest of Robert Pickton, who was later convicted of at least 26 women, many of whom were indigenous. Among Pickton's victims was Williams' cousin, Tanya Holyk, who had disappeared in 1996, and whose DNA was found on Pickton's farm in 2002.

Following this, Williams became a prominent activist within the missing and murdered indigenous women and girls (MMIWG) movement. She became noticed after frequently attending marches and vigils, as well as giving interviews, whilst wearing a shirt emblazoned with images of her aunt and cousin. In 2011, Williams founded Butterflies in Spirit, a dance group that performs across Canada to raise awareness of MMIWG. Initially consisting of the relatives of murdered and missing women in Canada, the group has subsequently grown to include the relatives of missing and murdered indigenous women from Mexico, Guatemala, Ecuador and Colombia. In addition to its performances, Butterflies in Spirit also support the families of MMIWG, as well as organising vigils and working with law enforcement.

Additionally, Williams works as the women's coordinator at the Vancouver Aboriginal Community Policing Centre, which aims to build more trusting relationships between the Vancouver Police Department and the city's indigenous communities. She also volunteers for the Missing and Murdered Indigenous Women Coalition, comprising 25 advocacy groups, and the Restoring Circles Society, which helps people recover from trauma.

Williams campaigned for a federal enquiry to be initiated by the Canadian government into the issue of MMIWG, and supported the National Inquiry into Missing and Murdered Indigenous Women and Girls, launched in 2016, which she said she hoped would bring closure to her family and the families of other MMIWG.

== Recognition ==
Williams' work was featured in the CBC documentary The Story She Carries.

In 2017, Williams was recognised by Samara Canada as Everyday Political Citizen of the Year in the over 30 category, chosen by a jury including Margaret Atwood, Rick Mercer, and Preston Manning.
