= Roxanne Charles-George =

Canadian mixed media artist

Roxanne Charles-George is a mixed media artist, activist, curator, storyteller, and cultural historian of Strait Salish and European descent. She previously was a councilor, and continues to be an active band member of Semiahmoo First Nation in Surrey, British Columbia, promoting art, language, and culture. As an artist, she works with a wide range of media. She directly responds to the problems of colonialism, and documents issues that reflect her life experiences such as spirituality, identity, urbanization, food security, resource extraction, trauma, and various forms of systemic violence. As a contemporary storyteller and cultural historian, her goal is to touch, move, and inspire others through her work. Her work employs traditional Semiahmoo forms of knowledge such as visual representation, oral history, and ceremony.

Her work is in the collection of Surrey Art Gallery.

== Exhibitions ==
=== Solo ===
- The Strata of Many Truths, Museum of Vancouver, 2019.

=== Group ===
- Ninety-Seven Days, Kwantlen Polytechnic University, 2014
- Views from the South Bank I: Histories, Memories, Myths, Surrey Art Gallery, 2015
- Gross Density Parcel, AgentC Projects, 2015
- Intangible: Memory and Innovation in Coast Salish Art, Bill Reid Gallery, 2017
- Ground Signals, Surrey Art Gallery, 2017
- how do you carry the land, Vancouver Art Gallery, 2018
- Connecting Threads, Surrey Art Gallery, 2018
- Li iyá:qtset – We Transform It, Reach Gallery Museum, 2019
- The Lind Prize 2019, Polygon Gallery, 2019
- In 2020, Charles-George began a collaboration with Laiwan and Daniel Negatu on a story-based artwork installation, in conjunction with the opening of Simon Fraser University's School of Sustainable Energy Engineering in Surrey.

== Education ==
Charles-George holds two undergraduate degrees from Kwantlen Polytechnic University, and completed a Master of Fine Arts at Simon Fraser University, Vancouver, BC. She also holds a certificate in Northwest Coast Jewelry Design from the Native Education College in Vancouver, BC.

== Teaching ==
Charles-George has taught arts workshops with Surrey Art Gallery, the White Rock Museum & Archives, and ArtsStarts.

== Curating ==
In 2017, Charles-George co-curated the exhibition Ground Signals at Surrey Art Gallery. In 2018, Charles-George was a guest curator for the Vancouver Mural Festival.

== Publications ==
- pensamientos en la Frontera, Moniker Press, 2018
- Northwest Coast #5 Roxanne Charles, Or Gallery, 2019

== Community involvement ==
Charles-George has been vocal and influential in addressing issues related to water quality and infrastructure, to the Semiahmoo First Nations. She has participated in organizing land-defense, and movement against fossil fuel expansion projects such as the Trans Mountain pipeline.

== Awards ==
Charles-George received a Paul Harris Fellow Award from the Semiahmoo Rotary Club in 2015. In 2018, she was recognized with a Surrey Civic Treasure award in 2018, which honours those “who have achieved excellence in the production of the arts and/or made significant contributions to the development of arts and heritage in the City of Surrey and beyond,” for her work as an artist and educator. In 2019, she was nominated for the Lind prize.
