= Tarah Hogue =

Canadian Métis curator

Tarah Hogue is a Canadian curator and writer known for her work with Indigenous art. Hogue is of Métis and settler ancestry and resides in Saskatoon, Saskatchewan. She is the inaugural Curator (Indigenous Art) at Remai Modern.

== Early life and education ==
Hogue was born in Red Deer, Alberta, which lies on the border between Treaty 6 and Treaty 7 territories.

Hogue received a bachelor's degree in Art History from Queen's University in 2008, and a master's degree in Art History in Critical and Curatorial Studies from the University of British Columbia in 2012.

== Career ==
After completing graduate studies, Hogue worked as an independent curator until 2014 when she became the curator-in-residence at grunt gallery in Vancouver, British Columbia. She was the Audain Aboriginal Curatorial Fellow at the Art Gallery of Greater Victoria in 2016, and the first Senior Curatorial Fellow, Indigenous Art at the Vancouver Art Gallery from 2017 to 2020. She became the Curator (Indigenous Art) at Remai Modern in 2020.

Hogue was recognized for her curatorial work in 2019 with an Award for Emerging Curator of Contemporary Canadian Art by the Hnatyshyn Foundation.

Hogue served as co-chair of the Indigenous Curatorial Collective's board of directors from 2018 to 2023, and was a founding member of Shushkitew Collective.

=== Selected curatorial projects ===
- Located in the Downtown Eastside of Vancouver, British Columbia, Hogue co-founded Gam Gallery in 2009, an exhibition space and artist studio that operated until 2019.
- Hogue co-curated Witnesses: Art and Canada’s Indian Residential Schools at the Morris and Helen Belkin Art Gallery, which ran from September 6 to December 1, 2013.
- Hogue co-organized the touring exhibition, #callresponse with Maria Hupfield and Tania Willard, which was first held at grunt gallery in 2016. Hupfield and Willard were also participating artists along with Christi Belcourt, Ursula Johnson, and Laakkuluk Williamson Bathory.
- Ayumi Goto and Peter Morin: how do you carry the land? at the Vancouver Art Gallery (July 14 to October 28, 2018) focused on Ayumi Goto and Peter Morin's collaborative performance practice and included artworks by Corey Bulpitt, Roxanne Charles, Navarana Igloliorte, Cheryl L'Hirondelle, Haruko Okano and Otoniya J. Okot Bitek. The exhibition was accompanied by three live performances and an artist publication.
- Co-curated with Sarah Biscarra Dilley, Freja Carmichael, Léuli Eshrāghi, and Lana Lopesi, Transits and Returns was a group exhibition of artists from Indigenous Nations located throughout the Pacific, and was held at the Vancouver Art Gallery from September 28, 2019 to February 23, 2020. The exhibition was the third in a series that began with The Commute at IMA Brisbane (September 22 to December 22, 2018), and was followed by Layover at Artspace Aotearoa (March 15 to May 25, 2019).
- lineages and land bases at the Vancouver Art Gallery (February 22 to May 24, 2020) focused on ideas of personhood and nature expressed in the basketry of Sewinchelwet (Sophie Frank) and the paintings of Emily Carr alongside works of contemporary art from the Vancouver Art Gallery's permanent collection.
- Co-curated with Aileen Burns and Johan Lundh, An apology, a pill, a ritual, a resistance at Remai Modern considered modalities of health and healing in relation to pharmakon and the idea of minoritarian medicine.
- Adrian Stimson: Maanipokaa'iini at Remai Modern (April 2 to September 4, 2022) was the first survey exhibition of this Siksika Nation artist, and was accompanied by a monograph publication.
- The group exhibition Storied Objects: Métis Art in Relation at Remai Modern (September 24, 2022 to May 22, 2023) brought together more than 40 contemporary and historic works by Métis artists. The exhibition received an Award for Excellence from the Association of Art Museum Curators in 2023.

=== Publications ===
- Hogue, Tarah ed. (2022). Adrian Stimson: Maanipokaa'iini. Remai Modern. ISBN 9781896359960.
- Hogue, Tarah (2022). "Who are we becoming here? Opening Spaces of Interrelation" in Jin-me Yoon: About Time. Hirmer Publishers and the Vancouver Art Gallery. ISBN 9783777439983.
- Hogue, Tarah (2020). "(Untitled) Delta Trim" in Maureen Gruben: Qulliq. Emily Carr University Press. ISBN 9780921356455.
- Hogue, Tarah ed. (2019). Transits and Returns (exhibition catalogue). Vancouver Art Gallery. ISBN 9781927656488.
- Hogue, Tarah (2018). Ayumi Goto and Peter Morin: how do you carry the land? Vancouver Art Gallery. ISBN 9781927656419.
- Hogue, Tarah (2017). "Walking Softly with Christi Belcourt". Canadian Art (Article).
- Hogue, Tarah (2016). "Vancouver Entrances: Lawrence Paul Yuxweluptun and Beau Dick". Canadian Art (Article).
- Spahan, Rose M.; Hogue, Tarah (2013). NET ETH: Going Out of the Darkness (Exhibition catalog). Malaspina Printmakers and ABC Art Books Canada. ISBN 978-0969299851.
