= Skookumchuck Hot Springs =

Skookumchuck Hot Springs Tsek Hot Springs, T'sek Hot Springs, Saint Agnes Well
- Hot spring
- Location of Skookumchuck Hot Springs in British Columbia
- Coordinates: 49°56′16″N 122°24′30″W
- Country: Canada
- Province: British Columbia
- First Nations: Skatin
- Time zone: UTC−07:00 (PT)
- Area code: N/A
- Website: www.tsekhotsprings.ca

Skookumchuck Hot Springs is a hot spring in British Columbia, Canada. Its pre-colonial, Indigenous name is Tsek Hot Spring or T'sek Hot Spring. The former colonial name is Saint Agnes Well. The springs are located near the First Nation community of Skookumchuck (former name on older maps, now known by the original name Skatin), on the historic Harrison Lillooet Gold Rush trail in the Lillooet River valley, south of Lillooet Lake.

The hot springs themselves, named Tsek (pronounced "chick") in the Stl'atl'imcets language were on private property purchased from "Goodwin Purcell" family by the Trethewey family after his death in the 1909 and acquired by the Government of Canada in 2008 to be held in trust for the Skatin First Nation until a potential treaty settlement.

Tsek Hot Springs, formally known as Skookumchuck Hot Springs was also known as Saint Agnes Well during the days of the Fraser Canyon Gold Rush and the Douglas Road, along which it is located, while Harrison Hot Springs farther south was known as St. Alice's Well; both were named by Justice Bailey for the daughters of Governor Douglas.

Near the community of Skatin were road houses known as "18 Mile House" or "20 Mile House", a reference to its distance from Port Douglas, at the Douglas Road's commencement at the head of Harrison Lake.

An Oblate mission was established in the 1860s and under direction of the priests, the native community began to build a village at Skookumchuck, about 4 kilometres south of the hot springs. As settling progressed, the Stl'atl'imx people built a striking Carpenter Gothic church in 1908, which was designated a National Historic Site of Canada in 1981, and remains standing today, the Church of the Holy Cross. A prominent feature is the simple but elegant stained red & blue glass windows (see Skatin for details).

The hot springs are managed and used by members of the Skatin community. Many local families still use the hot springs, and outside visitors are not allowed.

Road improved most of the way. In the Spring of 2015, the In-SHUCK-ch Forest Service Road was widened from 1 to 1 1/2 lanes to 2 lanes and two 1/2 lane shoulders (i.e. 3 lanes) for the whole length of Lillooet Lake. The road beyond the lake is somewhat rougher.
