= Skatin =

Skatin Skookumchuk
- Community
- Skatin First Nations
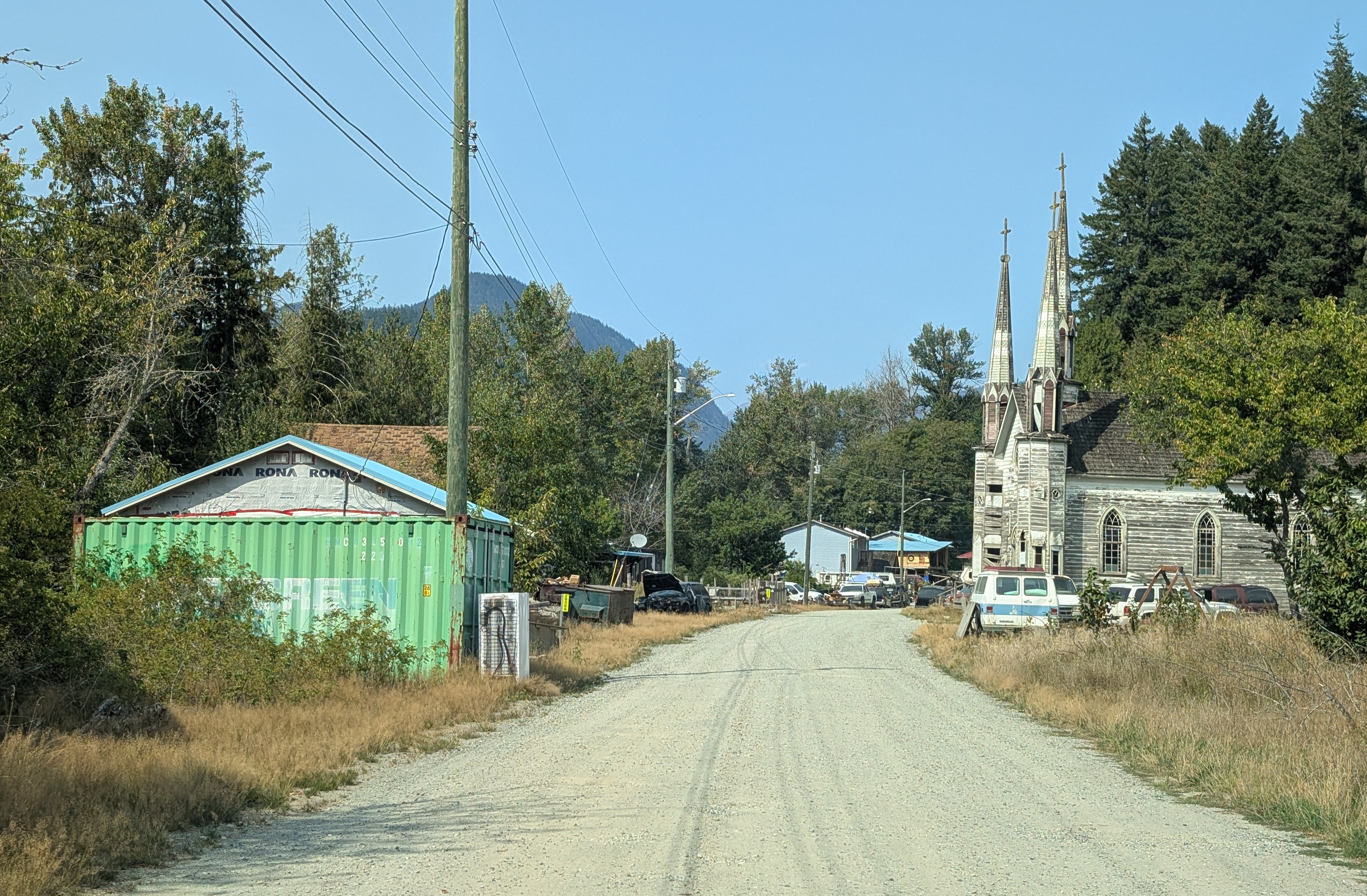
- Central Skatin
- Nickname: Skatin Nation
- Location within British Columbia
- Coordinates: 50°4′0″N 122°41′6″W
- Country: Canada
- Province: British Columbia
- Region: Fraser Valley
- Skatin First Nations: 562
- Established: 1895

Government
  - Type: Elected Band Council
  - Governing body: Band Council
  - Chief: Williams, Patrick

Population (2011)
  - Total: 105
- Time zone: PST
  - Summer (DST): PDT
- Postal code: V0N
- Area code: N/A
- Website: skatin.ca

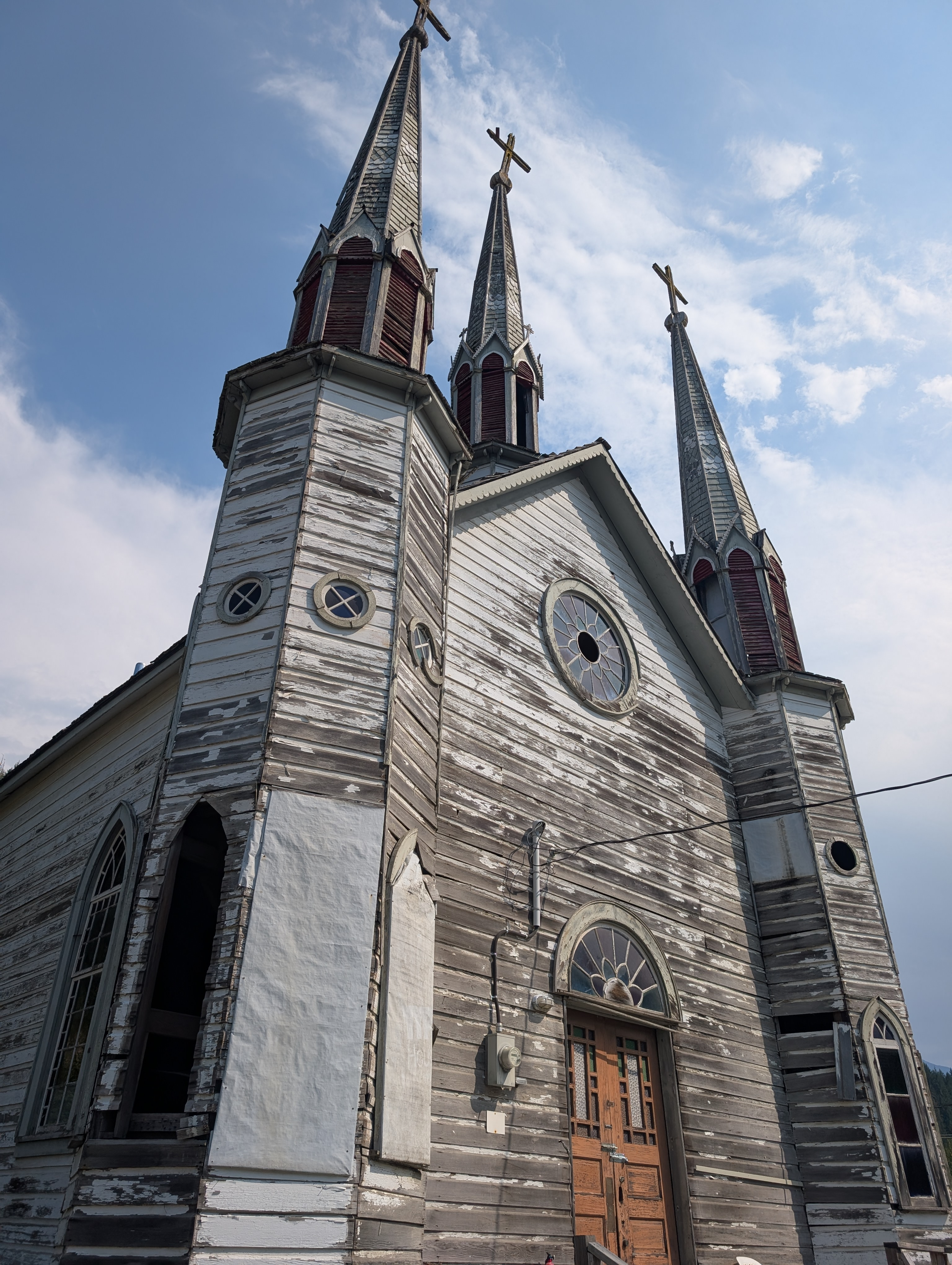
The Church of the Holy Cross in Skatin

Skatin is a community of under 100 persons in Skatin First Nations, aka the Skatin Nations, a Band government of the larger Band of the In-SHUCK-ch Nation, part of the St'at'imc people who are also referred to as Lower Stl'atl'imx. Skatin, the official new name, reverts to the traditional pre-colonial/pre-Columbian name. The alternate past name still commonly used by outsiders, Skookumchuck, is the St'at'imcets version of the Chinook Jargon Skookumchuck, meaning Strong Waters, i.e. rapids. The town site is 4 km south of T'sek Hot Spring (alt. spelling T'sik Hot Spring), formerly named both Saint Agnes Well and Skookumchuck Hot Springs. The community is 28 km south of the outlet of Lillooet Lake on the east side of the Lillooet River. It is approximately 75 km south of the town of Pemberton and the large reserve of the Lil'wat branch of the St'at'imc at Mount Currie, British Columbia. See Skatin First Nations for details about the complicated Band(s) structure.

Skatin is geographically an extension of both the Pemberton and Harrison Valleys, but by legal fiction is officially part of the Fraser Valley for Provincial and Federal administrative purposes.

== Population ==
Skatin community includes about 30 houses, a church, band office, fire hall, a new school and gymnasium built in 2003. The population living at Skatin is 65 at the town site, which varies according to season; 74 on other Reserves; and 275 off Reserves; the majority living in the Fraser Valley and lower mainland, including Vancouver.

=== Language ===
The Skatin First Nations speak Ucwalmícwts/Lower St̓át̓imc: fluent speakers: 7, understand or speak somewhat: 51, learning speakers: 51.

=== European Contact ===
The town church was built by members of the Douglas, Skatin and Samahquam Bands between 1895 and 1906. The Oblate Fathers established a mission there and demanded the native people in the surrounding wilderness to settle there. The Missionary Oblates of Mary Immaculate instructed the natives in Christianity, and to this day the Church of the Holy Cross, Skatin, stands as a stunning example of the North American architectural style known as Carpenter Gothic/Wood Gothic. In 1981, the church was designated as a National Historic Site by Heritage Canada. A community-based group, Ama Liisaos Heritage Trust Society, is working on conservation of the church. Prominent features are the simple but elegant stained glass windows, consisting of a checkerboard pattern of bright red mercuric glass and alternating bright blue cobalt glass squares. The glass was imported from Europe and brought in by mule, by a gold prospector who had struck it rich in the Cariboo Gold Rush, on his return to the goldfields.

=== The Gold Rush Era ===
In 1858 the Fraser Canyon Gold Rush began and some 30,000 miners began the trek through traditional Lil'wat and upper St'at'imc territory to the goldfields at Lillooet, then known as Cayoosh Flat Trail.

=== Flood control ===
In 1947 the Pemberton Dyking District, for flood control in the adjacent Pemberton Valley, lowered Lillooet Lake, permanently altering the character of the rapids and the water level in the Lillooet River. Conversely, Little Lillooet Lake earlier was raised by the Royal Engineers in their improvements to the route to the gold fields, turning it into a lower arm of Lillooet Lake proper, eliminating the portage and resulting in moving south the former Port Lillooet - down to what had been the south end of Little Lillooet Lake.

=== Telephone service ===
There are no landlines or cellular service in the area; radio telephones and satellite phones only. First Nations, loggers, roadbuilders and government officials all rely extensively on the use of VHF radios.

=== Electricity ===
Ironically, though adjacent to high tension power lines for more than half a decade, Skatin was not connected to the grid until January 2011, when BC Hydro crews disconnected the community diesel generating station.

=== Agriculture ===
There were several native and European homesteads with mixed farms with livestock, small orchards, groves of nut trees including hazels (C. avellana and C. sieboldiana) and filberts (C. maxima), walnuts and Northern pecans, and small vineyards ranging from three to 15 acres. These farms were very abundant because of rich alluvial soils in a sheltered valley system that runs in a general East-West direction, so the north shore of the river and lake have full sun year round and minimal shading. The waters also moderate the climate toward more temperate conditions with warm summer nights: i.e. able to grow tree fruits: peaches and apricots as the Okanagan Valley and Niagara Peninsula, and traditionally almonds such as fleshy almond/Northern almond/Hungarian almond var. Balaton/sweet kernel apricot (Prunus armeniaca var. Balaton). Oral tradition holds that BC Hydro removed (or stole) the soil from all the farms along and south of Lillooet Lake, for building the service road used to install the high tension power lines to feed California.

Several raised vegetable beds have been successfully started at the nearby hot springs. Discussions have been begun about using the geothermal source for district heating and greenhouses. The area has the potential to supply all temperate fruit and hothouse needs extending to Whistler.

=== Transportation ===
There are no rail or public transit buses, though there is a daily school bus for children. The Band maintains mini-buses for transport of seniors and others needing medical and other services in and beyond Pemberton.

=== Roads ===
Work is slowly proceeding on the 7 Nations Highway re-connecting Harrison Hot Springs with Pemberton. The last 20 miles at the head of Harrison Lake leading to Port Douglas are in very poor repair ever since the sawmill closed at Port Douglas, around 1995. Work on the Harrison Lake section was disrupted by the Wood Lake Wildfire in summer 2015. The westernmost section of road was improved in the spring of 2015; In-SHUCK-ch Forest Service Road/FSR was widened from 1 to 1½ lanes to 2 lanes and two ½-lane shoulders (3 lanes in toto) for the length of Lillooet Lake. Drivers are advised to take a basic back-roads tool kit including flares, flashlights, shovel, jacks, tire iron, at least 1 spare tire (2 is better), water for people and vehicle, refillable water cans, and several cans of run flat aerosols to re-inflate tires. In the winter, add an axe, shovel, studs and/or chains/other traction devices to the list. Check latest updates before heading out.

=== Air ===
There are charter helicopter flights, weather/visibility permitting. The closest airport is Pemberton Regional Airport. Seaplanes can be chartered out of Whistler/Green Lake Water Aerodrome and "land" nearby at the south end of Lillooet Lake.

=== Education ===
The elementary and junior high school (grades K-9), formerly known as the Head of the Lake School, now called Skatin Community School, is for the children of In-SHUCK-ch members, the majority of which are from Skatin and Tipella. 44 students currently attend this school.

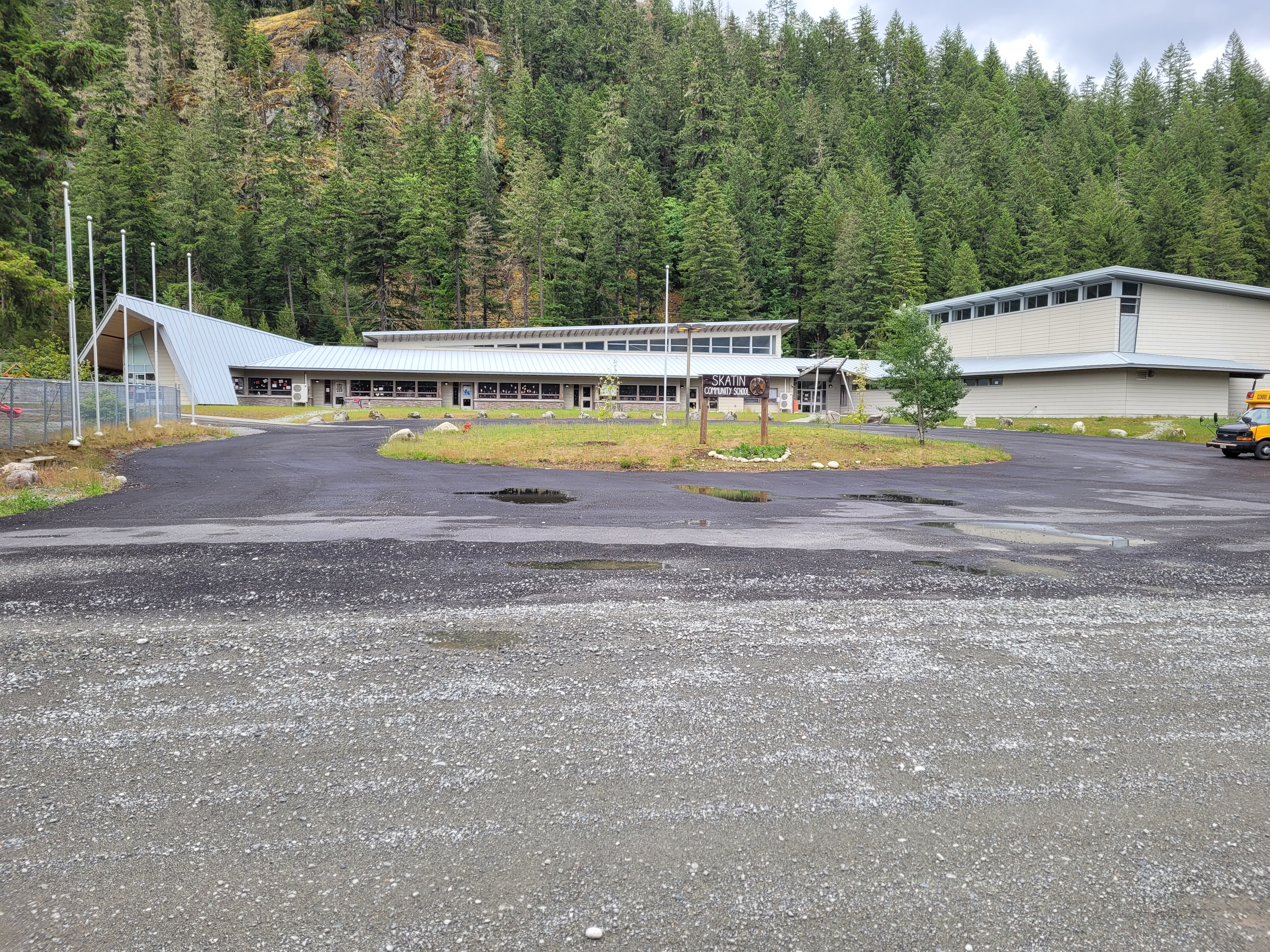
Skatin public school - near to the main town.

The Xit'olacw School in Xit'olacw Village (Mount Currie New Site) has 244 students, grades K-12.

School District 48 Sea to Sky operates public schools in Pemberton.

Conseil scolaire francophone de la Colombie-Britannique operates one Francophone primary school in Pemberton: école de la Vallée-de-Pemberton.

== Sources ==
- Decker, Frances; Fougberg, Margaret; Ronayne, Mary (1977). Pemberton History of a Settlement. Pemberton Pioneer Women. OCLC 4689455.
