= Tina Engels-Schwarzpaul =

German-New Zealand design academic

Anna-Christina Engels-Schwarzpaul
- Education: University of Auckland
- Scientific career
- Fields: spatial design
- Workplaces: German Werkbund, Messe Frankfurt, Auckland University of Technology
- Thesis: Myth, symbol, ornament: The loss of meaning in transition (2001)
- Doctoral students: Lana Lopesi

Anna-Christina Engels-Schwarzpaul is a German-New Zealand design academic. She is currently a full professor at the Auckland University of Technology.

== Academic career ==
After a 2001 PhD thesis titled 'Myth, symbol, ornament: The loss of meaning in transition' at the University of Auckland, she moved to the Auckland University of Technology, rising to full professor. Notable students include Lana Lopesi.

== Selected works ==
- Engels-Schwarzpaul, A-Chr, and Michael A. Peters, eds. Of other thoughts: Non-traditional ways to the doctorate: A guidebook for candidates and supervisors. Springer Science & Business Media, 2013.
- Refiti, Albert. "Whiteness, smoothing and the origin of Samoan architecture." (2010).
- Engels-Schwarzpaul, A-Chr, and K-A. Wikiteria. "Take me away... in search of original dwelling." (2010).
- Engels-Schwarzpaul, A-Chr. "‘A warm grey fabric lined on the inside with the most lustrous and colourful of silks’: dreams of airships and tropical islands." Journal of Architecture 12, no. 5 (2007): 525–542.
