= Laiwan =

Zimbabwean artist, art critic, gallerist, writer, curator and educator

- Born: 1961 (age 64–65); Harare, Zimbabwe
- Education: Emily Carr University of Art and Design; Simon Fraser University
- Occupations: Artist, writer, educator, curator, gallerist
- Known for: Cultural criticism, activism, participatory projects
- Website: http://www.laiwanette.net/

Laiwan (born 1961) is an interdisciplinary artist, writer, curator, gallerist, activist, and educator. Her wide-ranging artistic practice is based in poetics and philosophy. She lives in Vancouver, British Columbia.

== Biography ==
Laiwan was born in Harare, Zimbabwe in 1961 of Toisan Chinese descent. Her family emigrated to Canada in 1977 to leave the war in apartheid Rhodesia. She graduated with a diploma from Emily Carr College of Art and Design (now Emily Carr University of Art and Design) in 1983. In 1999, she received a Master of Fine Arts from Simon Fraser University School for the Contemporary Arts.

In 1983, Laiwan founded Or Gallery, while Arni Haraldsson, Petra Watson, Lori Hinton, Michelle Normoyle, and Ken Lum were the founders of the Or Gallery Society, established under the Society Act in 1984. As the founder, her intent was to dispel myths about the impossibility of founding and operating a gallery, particularly for women. She was chair of the grunt gallery board of directors from 2010 to 2014.

From 2001 to 2022, Laiwan taught in the Master of Fine Arts Interdisciplinary Arts program at Goddard College in Washington state. She currently works in the Vancouver Park Board's Decolonization, Arts and Culture Department.

== Artistic practice ==
Laiwan's socially, culturally, and environmentally engaged practice includes performance, photography, drawing, installation, audio, video, writing, research, memes, web projects, mapping, and interactive public art projects. She has been investigating colonialism since the 1980s, with an emphasis on decoloniality. She explores concepts of presence by way of bodily, emotional intelligence, and spatial politics located in the environment. Her more recent work addresses biodiversity, human impacts on ecosystems, and our relationships with non-human species.

Laiwan has been awarded numerous prizes, including a 2023 VIVA Award, 2021 Emily Award from Emily Carr University, 2021 BC Arts Council Visual Arts Award, 2020 Canada Council Research and Creation Award, and the 2008 Vancouver Queer Media Artist Award. She has received commissions from the City of Vancouver's Public Art Program, Vancouver Heritage Foundation, and Burnaby Art Gallery. From 2017 to 2018, she had a residency with the University of British Columbia's Department of Earth, Ocean, and Atmospheric Sciences.

Her work is held in the Vancouver Art Gallery, Morris and Helen Belkin Art Gallery, and other private collections, while her time-based work is available from VIVO Media Arts Centre in Vancouver and V-Tape in Toronto.

== Select artworks ==
Travels in China, 1985 is a 1986 work consisting of hundreds of 35 mm colour slides taken during Laiwan's first trip to China at the age of 24. Created in collaboration with Nina Skogster, a Helsinki-based artist, they retraced the path of Laiwan's own migration via an east to west railway route. The curious and fleeting candid images produced during this unplanned journey depict people, architecture, activities, and exchanges. Laiwan was an outsider in China, travelling without proficiency in the local language and little knowledge of family relations remaining in the country. This stood in contrast to her experiences in Canada where she is perceived as only Chinese or those in Zimbabwe, where despite being born and raised there, is not visibly native.

In Laiwan's 1986 slide sequence work, The Mesmerization of Language: The Language of Mesmerization, she deals with language as a structure which has a life independent of its conveyed meaning. There are three parts to this artwork. Part One, titled "OBSESSION: POSSESSION" shows the poem Sappho 31 in both the original Greek and as an English translation. Part Two is titled "SPELL," wherein Laiwan translates the Christian prayer Our Father from sign language into words, deconstructing and breaking apart the text, phrase by phrase, word by word, and letter by letter. "Untitled," the Part Three of the project, moves from language into images of landscapes.

In her 1996 to present project dotting like flatheads: this is the English I learn, Laiwan uses correction fluid to redact the text in a Chinese-English dictionary she found in a former dumpsite on the current site of the Strathcona Community Gardens, leaving behind poetic fragments. These types of dictionaries were beloved by her family and are symbolic of the social and perceptual translation her family endured as Chinese natives living in apartheid Rhodesia. This series is a continuation of Laiwan's ongoing interventions of indexes and glossaries. In its most recent iteration, 2021's AGILE—commissioned for the fiftieth anniversary of the Capilano Review, each page represents a letter to form words while highlighting the discordance between perception and expression.

In 2016, as part of the City of Vancouver's Public Art Program, the Coastal City series, Laiwan displayed the work Barnacle City, which was projected on various buildings throughout downtown Vancouver. In 2018, Laiwan started the Mobile Barnacle City Live/Work Studio, an installation created in the SiteFactory bus, which was a part of Emily Carr University's Living Labs Ten Different Things project series. Mobile Barnacle City was installed in various locations around Chinatown in Vancouver. The project also involved T'uy'tanat-Cease Wyss and Anne Riley.

== Select exhibitions ==
=== Solo exhibitions ===
- Laiwan: Traces, Erasures, Resists, Morris and Helen Belkin Art Gallery, Vancouver, 2022
- How Water Remembers, Massy Arts, Vancouver, 2021
- Maple Tree Spiral: the pedagogy of a tree in the city, Artspeak, Vancouver, 2019
- Fountain: the origin or source of anything, The WALL at the CBC Plaza, commissioned by the Vancouver Heritage Foundation, 2014
- Laiwan: Loose Work, Or Gallery and at On Main, Vancouver, 2008
- Duet: Étude For Solitudes, YYZ Artist's Outlet / Images Festival, Toronto, 2006
- Quartet for the Year 4698 or 5760: Improvisation for 4 Film Projectors, with Lori Freedman, Open Space Gallery, Victoria, 2002
- Small, Medium and Not Large: Books and Collages 1982 to Present, grunt gallery, Vancouver, 1996 and articule, Montreal, 1997
- CAVE / CAVEAT, Or Gallery, Vancouver, 1982

=== Group exhibitions ===
- Urban Screen, with PANDEMIA — the movie, Libby Leshgold Gallery, Vancouver, 2021-2022
- Thought, outside, curated by Amy Kazymerchyk, Western Front, Vancouver, 2020
- Beginning with the Seventies: GLUT, curated by Lorna Brown, Morris and Helen Belkin Art Gallery, Vancouver, 2018
- Through A Window: Visual Art and SFU 1965–2015; SFU Galleries, Vancouver and Burnaby, 2015
- Da Bao: Take Out, Plug In ICA, Winnipeg and Surrey Art Gallery, Surrey, 2013
- Da Bao: Take Out, curated by Shannon Anderson / Doug Lewis, Varley Art Gallery, Markham, Mississauga Art Gallery, 2012
- c.1983: Parts 1&2, curated by Helga Pakasaar, Presentation House Gallery, North Vancouver, 2012
- Everything Everyday, curated by Bruce Grenville, Vancouver Art Gallery, Vancouver, 2010
- How Soon Is Now: Contemporary Art from Here, curated by Kathleen Ritter, Vancouver Art Gallery, 2009
- Limits of Tolerance: Re-framing Multicultural State Policy, Centre A Gallery, Vancouver, 2007
- Group Search: Art in the Library, Vancouver Public Library, Vancouver, 2007
- rapture: rupture, Artspeak, Vancouver, 1999

== Curatorial work ==
Laiwan was co-founder and co-curator of the 1988 First Vancouver Lesbian Film Festival at Vancouver East Cinema, presented by the Vancouver Lesbian Network. In 1993, she curated the exhibition Making Out: Women on the Verge of Revolution in the Mango Swamp of Enchantment at Pitt Gallery. She was co-programmer of Ten Years of Local Lesbian Short Film in the Out On Screen Queer Film and Video Festival in 1998. In 2014, Laiwan curated Queering the International, an exhibition part of the Queer Arts Festival, which took place at the Roundhouse Community Arts and Recreation Centre and examined issues of sexual identity.

== Editorial projects ==
With Arni Haraldsson, Laiwan founded and edited Woo (later The Paper) at Emily Carr College of Art and Design from November 1980 to April 1981. From 1987 to 1998, she was a contributor and collective member of Angles magazine. In 1990, Laiwan co-founded ZWICCT: Zimbabwean Women in Contemporary Culture Trust (later WICCSA: Women in Contemporary Culture Southern Africa). She created a zine for queer women of colour entitled Zine but not Herd from 1993 to 1994, was co-editor of the artist-run centre Western Front's Front Magazine from 1994 to 1997, and was production coordinator and contributor of Kinesis: News about Women That's Not in the Dailies from 1995 to 1998.

== Select Bibliography ==
=== Publications by Laiwan ===
- TENDER: Selected Poems, Vancouver: Talonbooks, 2020

=== Writing by Laiwan ===
- "LUNG: Towards Embodying" in DAMP: Contemporary Vancouver Media Arts, Anvil Press, Vancouver, 2008
- "Ed Pien: Drawing Hauntology" feature article in Canadian Art, Summer 2007, Vol. 24 #2

=== Exhibition Catalogues ===
- Amy Kazymerchyk, Laiwan: Traces, Erasures, Resists, exhibition catalogue, Morris and Helen Belkin Art Gallery, Vancouver, 2024
- Kathleen Ritter, How soon is now, exhibition catalogue, Vancouver Art Gallery, 2009
- Liz Park, Limits of Tolerance: Re-framing Multicultural State Policy, exhibition catalogue, Centre A, 2007
- Laiwan: Distance of Distinct Vision, exhibition catalogue, Western Front, Vancouver, 1992

=== Reviews of Laiwan's Work ===
- Queer Art Speaks to love, hate around world by Robin Laurence, The Georgia Straight, July 31-August 7, 2014 Volume 48, number 2432
- QAF extending its reach, draws top talent by Dana Gee, The Province, July 22, 2014
- Digital Art Reflections & 10 Seconds in Time ask audiences to stop and consider by Robin Laurence, The Georgia Straight, August 21, 2012, pg. 33
