= Church of the Holy Cross (Skatin) =

Historic church in British Columbia, Canada

Coordinates: 49.9370°N 122.4082°W

Church of the Holy Cross, Skatin
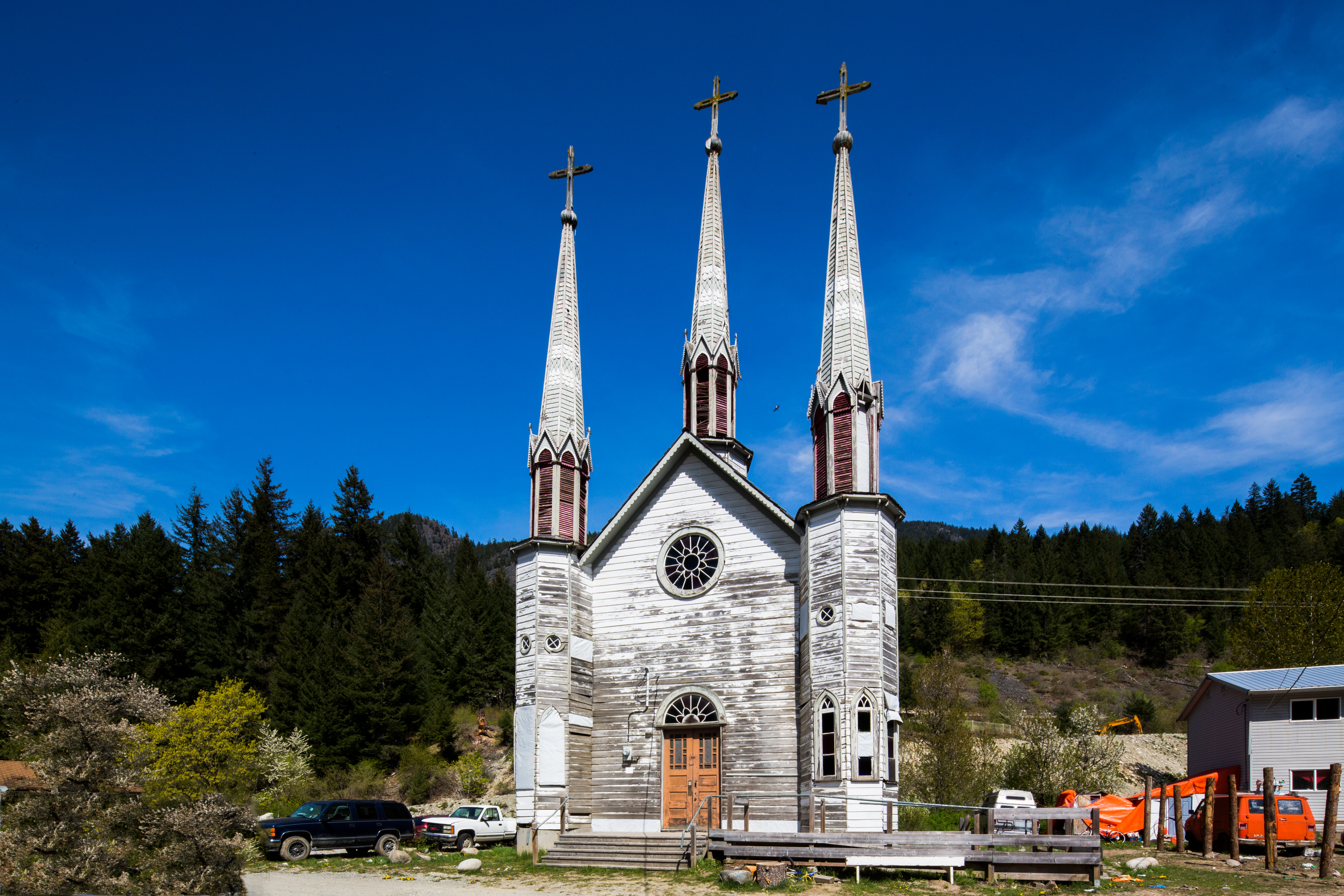

General information
- Architectural style: Carpenter Gothic
- Location: Canada
- Completed: ca. 1905

Technical details
- Structural system: wooden

National Historic Site of Canada
- Official name: Church of the Holy Cross National Historic Site of Canada
- Designated: 1981

The Church of the Holy Cross is a National Historic Site of Canada, located on one of the Indian reserves of the Skatin First Nation, in southwestern British Columbia. It is located on the east side of the Lillooet River on BC's first inland Gold Rush trail, the Douglas Road. Skatin Nations is the St'at'imcets language rendition of the reserve-town's usual name in English, Skookumchuck Hot Springs (often just "Skookumchuck", which means "strong water(s)", is also the name of three other places in British Columbia and in general use means a rapids - a set of rapids, historically called the "Falls" of the Lillooet River are nearby).

== History ==
Missionaries from the Missionary Oblates of Mary Immaculate had first traveled through the Lillooet River valley starting around 1860. They established missions at Port Douglas and Skookumchuck Hot Springs, and encouraged the native people of the area to settle together in small villages. Earlier churches are no longer standing. There has never been a resident priest assigned to the villages in the area; priests travelled through on their way north from St. Mary's Indian Residential School in Mission, or came down from Mount Currie. Usually they came only once a year, and there are many examples of five or six couples all being married or a number of babies being baptised on the same day, when the annual visit of the priest took place. The services often took place outdoors, or in the home of a community leader. There had been at least 2 other places of worship in Skatin before they embarked on the present building.

Some of the families travelled outside for seasonal work, and had seen the large churches in Sechelt, British Columbia, and New Westminster. They were also inspired by the prayer cards with pictures of European cathedrals, and chose to create a place of worship that is also a work of art. Although some men may have worked building other churches, they were not trained carpenters, and used the tools available to them at the time.

Local aboriginal craftsmen laboured for years on the elaborately carved altar and finely worked wood details of this remarkable building, which was completed about 1905. Materials from the local area were used, huge trees from the forests; some of the milling may have been done at Port Douglas or even as far away as Harrison Mills at the south end of Harrison Lake. Materials were transported by horse-drawn wagons, rafts and canoes, or carried on their backs.

Many generations have been baptized, married and buried from the Church which continues today as a place of worship and ceremony for people in the surrounding communities of Samahquam, Douglas First Nation and Mount Currie. The Church was blessed by the Catholic Archbishop in 1908, but the building belongs to the people of the communities who built it. Some restoration work was carried out in 1982 to 1984, and the church was blessed by Archbishop Carney. At that time, elders Henry Peters and Margaret Ann Peters (Williams) celebrated their 51st wedding anniversary, and baptized a great-grand daughter, Jessica.

== National Historic Site ==
The Church was designated by the national Historic Sites and Monuments Board in 1981 because of its unique Carpenter Gothic architecture and hand-carved interior features. The church builders were commemorated with a bronze plaque erected on June 22, 2006. The tri-lingual plaque is in Ucwalmicwts, English and French. "Amha Lakwa Lamcalalhcw"

Built about 1905 by members of the Stl'atl'imx Nation, the Church of the Holy Cross is remarkable for the beauty and originality of its interior decoration. The craftsmanship of the cedar sculptures, altar, pews, and grave markers of this wooden Carpenter Gothic style building attests to the exceptional skills of the local artisans. The corner towers, rose window, three spires, and arched windows also contribute to the distinctive character of this 'cathedral in the wilderness'

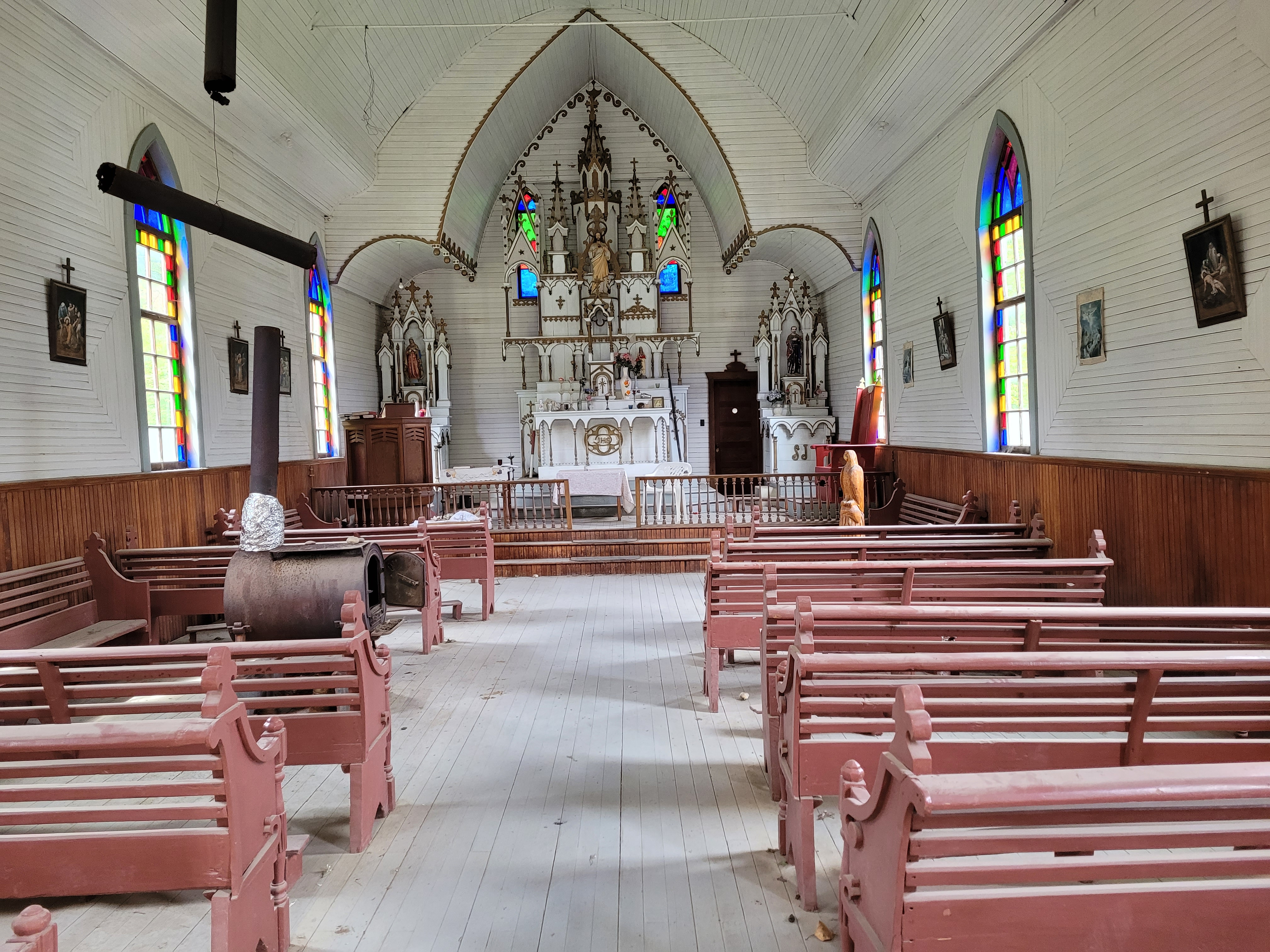
Interior of the Church of the Holy Cross in Skookumchuck BC

== Conservation ==
In the winter of 2006, conservation work started, stabilizing the interior of the towers and steeples. The following year, work on the foundations was started; completed in 2008, the Church is now supported by in-ground concrete footings, which replace the old river rock. In some places where the original wood beams supporting the church were rotted, the ends of the beams were trimmed, and new wood inserted. When the front porch was removed, the long support beam under the front of the Church was found to be full of dry rot - easily 4 to 5 inches of the 16 inch timber had been destroyed. In order to complete the work before winter, a concrete bearing wall was installed under the front of the church. The two towers on the east and west are also now supported by concrete foundations. The building is now on a stable foundation, but deterioration of the envelope, towers, and decorative trims continue.

The work on the foundations was taped by PTV Productions, and a one-hour documentary "Saving Places" will be broadcast on History TV.

In August 2009, the Society received notice from Parks Canada that the Canadian government is prepared to enter into a cost-sharing agreement, with funds of up to $202,060 for 'eligible' expenses. The volunteers will still have to raise matching funds for the work to proceed. An official Ministerial announcement by MP Randy Kamp was celebrated on November 14, 2009.

Since then, there has been an Emergency Intervention at the Church; damaged windows, trim, and woodwork have been removed from the two towers and stored safely. Exposed holes have been covered with plywood and Typar to keep out the weather. Over the winter, a team of architects, engineer and consultants will be completed a detailed analysis and plans for conservation work. Conservation will include repair and replacement of decorative trim and exterior cladding, repair of windows, frames, mullions and trim, scraping and repainting the exterior, replacement of the roof which is nearing 30 years old, upgrading the electrical system, and other safety and fire suppression measures.

The Ama Liisaos Heritage Trust Society is raising funds for the conservation of the building; total budget is expected to exceed $450,000 with about half of that coming from the federal cost-sharing agreement. An "Adopt a Window" campaign has been started, giving families and supporters the opportunity to honour a family member or special event on a memorial plaque. Anyone interested in supporting conservation of this special site should contact Ama Liisaos Heritage Trust Society. A book Spirit in the Land: Our Place of Prayer tells the story of the Church and its builders.

A local elder explains that the people built this church because they were devout Catholics. "They were devoutly spiritual people. Originally, they would have prayed on the land, wherever they were. It was the priests who taught the people to pray in a church. This building has become a centre for our culture and our communities. Our ancestors built this church by working together. It can bring our people back together once again."
