= Jen Delos Reyes =

Canadian artist

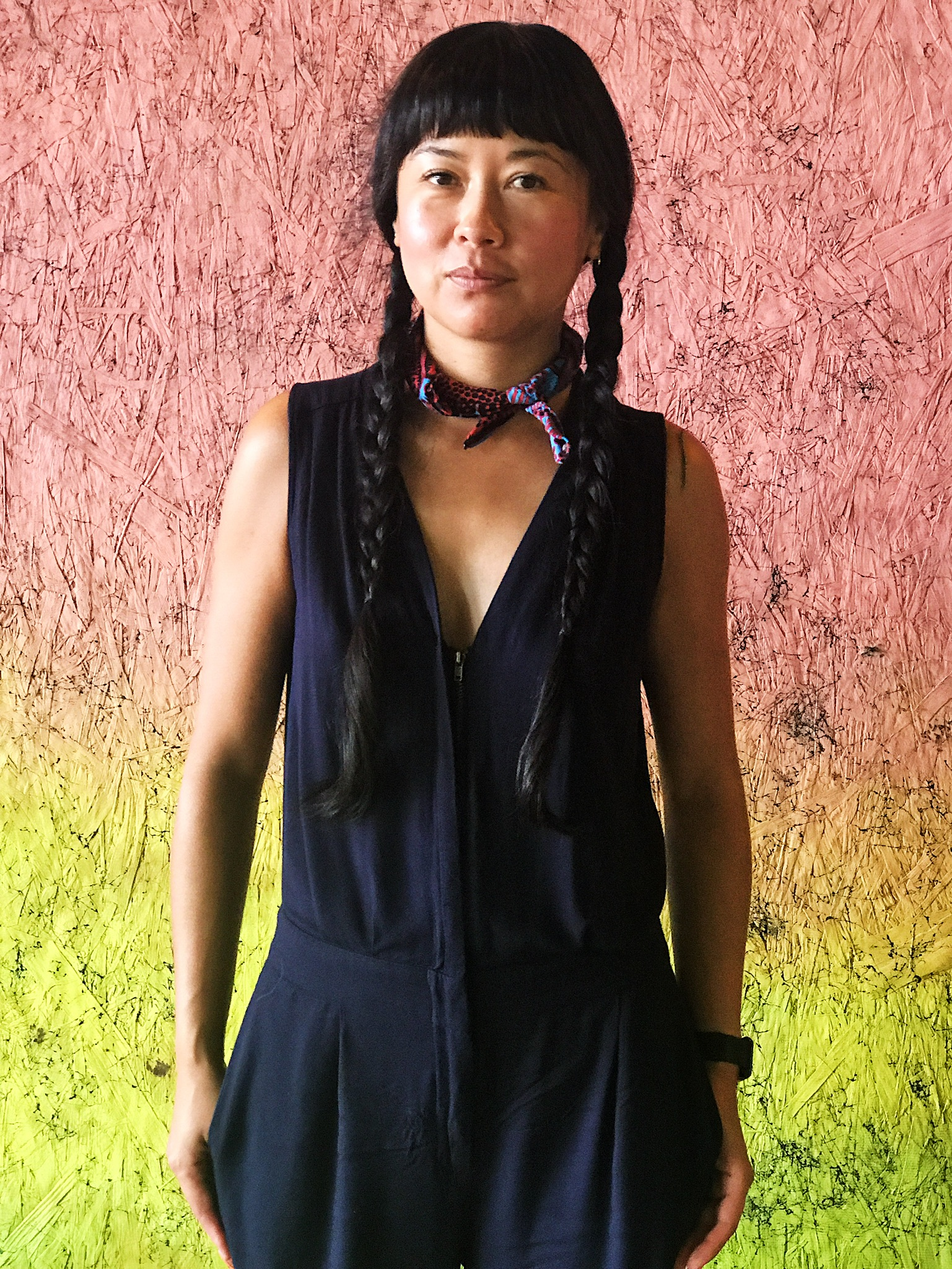
- Jen Delos Reyes in 2018
- Known for: collaborative artist, writer, educator

Jen Delos Reyes is an artist originally from Winnipeg, Manitoba, Canada. Through her upbringing, she learned about resourcefulness, community building, and how to prioritize joy, fashion, and aesthetics from her Filipine mother. Her research interests include the history of socially engaged art, artist-run culture, group work, band dynamics, folk music, and artists' social roles. Delos Reyes is the founder and director of Open Engagement, an international conference on socially engaged art. She was an assistant professor at Portland State University in the Art and Social Practice program from 2008 to 2014. She is now the associate director of the School of Art and Art History at the University of Illinois, Chicago.

== Artistic practice ==
Delos Reyes invests in artist-run culture and artist-run institutions by creating platforms to highlight and support other artists. This has taken the form of projects such as Open Engagement and collaborative writing projects and exhibitions. Open Engagement, an annual artist-led conference dedicated to expanding the dialogue around and creating a site of care for the field of socially engaged art, ran from 2007 to 2017.

Her practice also explores ideas of group work through looking at music culture and band dynamics.

She is currently working on I’m Going to Live the Life I Sing About in My Song: How Artists Make and Live Lives of Meaning, a book exploring the artist impetus toward art and everyday life.

== Teaching activities ==
From 2008 to 2013, Delos Reyes was the co-director of the Art and Social Practice MFA program at Portland State University. She was the area chair from 2010 to 2013. During her time at Portland State University she proposed, wrote, and realized the curriculum and structure for a low-residency MFA program in art and social practice that has since blended the localized program under a flexible residency model. This model allows students to reside outside of Portland during their course of study and create meaningful work in their communities.

Delos Reyes has also created courses for Portland State University that explore the history of socially engaged art from 1920 to the present, and courses on teaching socially engaged art practice at the undergraduate level.

== Publishing ==
Art and Social Practice Reference Points is a book series edited by Jen Delos Reyes and produced in conjunction with current MFA students that covers three areas related to socially engaged art: people, thematic volumes, and workbooks. Working in conjunction with faculty, students select individuals or groups that are influential for socially engaged artists, themes that capture currents in contemporary social art practice, and methods for creative application. Delos Reyes has also edited an anthology of Open Engagement: 2007–2013.

== Exhibitions ==
• Shine a Light, Portland Art Museum, Portland, OR. 2013
• Band Class, Ditch Projects, Eugene, OR. 2011
• The Open Daybook, Los Angeles Contemporary Exhibitions, Los Angeles, CA. 2011
• Utopia, OH. CS18, Cincinnati, OH. 2011
• The Incidental Person. Apexart. NY, NY. 2010
• Parties Prenantes. Bétonsalon, Paris, France. 2009
• Come Together, The Kitchen, New York, NY. 2006

== Bibliography ==
Delos Reyes, Jen. 2012. Open Engagement: An Anthology. Portland: Publication Studio.
Delos Reyes, Jen. "Public Access: Entry Points into Contemporary Art," Service Media. Edited by Stuart Keeler. Green Lantern Press, 2012.
Delos Reyes, Jen. "Because We Are Your Friends: Legacies of Institutional Critique in Art and Social Practice." BOMB Online.
Delos Reyes, Jen. "From The Mass Ornament to the Masses: The Shift From Relational Aesthetics to Social Practice." York University.
Delos Reyes, Jen. "We are here for you". Decentre: Concerning Artist-Run Culture. Toronto. YYZ Books.
