= Native Art Department International =

Art collective

Native Art Department International (NADI) is a Toronto-based collaborative project of wife-and-husband pair of artists Maria Hupfield (b. 1975) and Jason Lujan (b. 1971). Together they curate group exhibitions in which they sometimes show and for which they often make work together. They see this as a way to counter the pigeonholing of contemporary art by Native Americans and people of First Nations descent. Artforum critic Gabrielle Moser has also written about the duo's "commitment to artistic camaraderie, decolonial politics, and non-competition."

== Background and history ==
Hupfield is Ojibwe and belongs to the Wasauksing First Nation, and Lujan is Mestizo. Hupfield has said "It’s important for artists to generate and frame our own content so we’re not always looking at institutions to co-opt and define it outside of our awareness." Lujan told the Tacoma Art Museum for its website, "There is a lot of value to Native artists representing anything they want today, not just their own cultures. The field is wide open. I think artists have a lot of good things to say about anything and everything, and there is plenty of room for all of that."

In 2015, the couple established a blog that documents their activities as Native Art Department International and publishes interviews with artists and scholars and articles on subjects of interest such as South African magazine Chimurenga and early Japanese American photographer Frank Matsura. They have screened their work and curated those of others at Artists Space and at The Kitchen in New York.

== Curatorial projects ==
Exhibitions by Native Art Department International include

- "free play" at Trestle Projects, Brooklyn
- "Chez BRKLYN" in Galerie Se Konst in Falun, Sweden in 2016 and
- "In Dialogue" at University of Toronto Art Centre in 2017, the latter two with other artists including Duane Linklater

Curatorial projects in which their own work isn't a part include

- "First Things Don't Come First," at the Fabulous Festival of Fringe Film, Durham, Ontario, Canada in 2017
- "Without Us There Is No You," a screening of six video works by indigenous artists at Artists Space to mark Art in America's inaugural indigenous contemporary art issue
- "Oh So You've Had an Indian Friend?," an evening in 2018 celebrating the life and work of Diane Burns, with artist Sky Hopinka and representatives from the organizations Amerinda, the St. Mark's Poetry Project, and the Endangered Language Institute at Downtown Arts

Inclusion in other group shows, residencies, and talks

- "There Is No Then and Now; Only Is and Is Not," video projection featuring artist Dennis Redmoon Darkeem (Yamassee Yat’siminoli) in the 2018 group exhibition "The Racial Imaginary Institute: On Whiteness" at The Kitchen, curated by the organization's curatorial team, Claudia Rankine, and eight others
- Fourth Arts Block residency, 2018 (with Chinatown Art Brigade), where NADI installed two works
- A panel discussion with Darkeem and Jeffrey Gibson at the Drawing Center, moderated by Johanna Burton, director and curator of Education and Public Engagement at the New Museum. The talk touched on drawing, heritage, indigenous art, ceremonies, and radical mark-making.
- A talk at the Metropolitan Museum of Art in conjunction with the exhibition "Art of Native America: The Charles and Valerie Diker Collection"

== Critical reception ==
In Christopher Green of Hyperallergic's interview of the couple about their work in the 2016 Brooklyn show "free play," he wrote about the contrast between their individual styles. He described Lujan's use of the Zuni print as "graphically intense" and Hupfield's materiality as "soft." A Swedish reporter said of their subsequent show "Chez BRKLYN" in Galerie Se Konst, "The artists ... put people at the center, shrinking the world and succeeding in showing how much we are one regardless of home address. It is inspiring, rich with energy, and hopeful. We hope these Brooklyn artists return soon."

They received a review in Artforum of their 2020 solo show at Mercer Union in Toronto, an installation of a variety of works since 2017, including Untitled (Carl Beam), 2017, and two videos they made when they lived in New York City including one with a number of artist-friends made filmed the Bard Graduate Center Gallery, Everything Sacred Is Far Away, 2019. Of the latter, which staged episodes around the life of anthropologist Franz Boas, Gabrielle Moser wrote, "Reminiscent of community-access television, organized-labor role play and strategies from the Theater of the Oppressed.... they reveal something honest about intercultural interactions: that they are always messy, deeply strange, and perpetually under construction."
