= Skatin First Nations =

First Nation in British Columbia, Canada

The Skatin First Nations, also known as the Skatin Nations, are a band government of the In-SHUCK-ch Nation, a small group of the larger Stʼatʼimc people who are also referred to as Lower Stlʼatlʼimx. The Town of Skatin - the St'at'imcets version of the Chinook Jargon Skookumchuck- is located 4 km south of Tʼsek Hot Spring – commonly & formerly named both St. Agnes' Well & Skookumchuck Hot Springs The community is 28 km south of the outlet of Lillooet Lake on the east side of the Lillooet River. It is approximately 75 km south of the town of Pemberton and the large reserve of the Lilʼwat branch of the Stʼatʼimc at Mount Currie. Other bands nearby are Samahquam at Baptiste Smith IR on the west side of the Lillooet River at 30 km. and Xaʼxtsa First Nations; the latter is located at Port Douglas, near the mouth of the Lillooet River where it enters the head of Harrison Lake. The N'Quatqua First Nation on Anderson Lake, between Mount Currie and Lillooet, was at one time involved in joint treaty negotiations with the In-SHUCK-ch but its members have voted to withdraw, though a tribal council including the In-SHUCK-ch bands and N'Quatqua remains, the Lower Stlʼatlʼimx Tribal Council.

The site of the hot springs was used by travelers on the old Douglas Road prior to the abandonment of that route by most traffic in about 1864, when the Cariboo Road via the Fraser Canyon became the main access to the BC Interior from the Lower Mainland.

The Oblate Fathers established a mission & church - which is still standing- and encouraged the native people in the surrounding "wilderness" to settle there. see Skatin for details.

Work is slowly proceeding on the 7 Nations Highway re-connecting Harrison Hot Springs to Pemberton see Skatin for details

== Population ==
Skatin town site includes about 30 houses, a band office, and a new school and gymnasium built in 2003. The population living at Skatin is 65 at the town site, 74 on other Reserves & 275 off Reserves, the majority living in the Fraser Valley and Lower Mainland including Vancouver.

== Indian Reserves ==
Indian Reserves under the administration of the Skatin Nations are:

- Franks Indian Reserve No. 10, on the left bank of the Lillooet River, at the 11 Mile Post of the Douglas Portage (i.e. the Douglas Road), 44.90 ha. nsesq was the name in Ucwalmicwts for the village formerly on this site. 49°53′23″N 122°18′04″W
- Glazier Creek Indian Reserve No. 12, on the right bank of Snowcap Creek, at the south end of Glacier Lake, 113.30 ha. 49°52′00″N 122°27′00″W
- Morteen Indian Reserve No. 9, on the left bank of the Lillooet River, adjoined on the north by Skookumchuck IR No. 4A, 50.60 ha. 49°55′00″N 122°22′00″W
- Perrets Indian Reserve No. 11, on the left bank of the Lillooet River at the 10 Mile Post of the Douglas Portage, 12.10 ha. cúmlvqs was the name in Ucwalmicwts for the village formerly on this site.49°52′40″N 122°17′34″W
- Sklahhesten Indian Reserve No. 5, at the 14 Mile Post of the Douglas Portage, on the Lillooet River, 32 ha. k'acsten was the name in Ucwalmicwts for the village formerly on this site.49°54′54″N 122°19′28″W
- Sklahhesten Indian Reserve No. 5A, on the left bank of the Lillooet River adjoining Sklahhesten IR No. 5 on the north, 74.9 ha. 49°55′14″N 122°20′04″W
- Sklahhesten Indian Reserve No. 5B, on the left bank of the Lillooet River, 35.2 ha.49°54′26″N 122°19′16″W
- Skookumchuck Indian Reserve No. 4, both banks of the Lillooet River opposite Snowcap Creek, at the 19 Mile Post on the Douglas Portage, on the Lillooet River, 212.9 ha. (s)qátin(a) was the name in Ucwalmicwts for the village formerly on this site.49°56′39″N 122°24′39″W
- Skookumchuck Indian Reserve No. 4A, on the left bank of the Lillooet River, southeast of Skookumchuck IR No. 4, 86.2 ha. 49°56′00″N 122°23′00″W
- Sweeteen Indian Reserve No. 3, near the 21 Mile Post on the Douglas Portage, on the Lillooet River, 14.50 ha. (s)cwíten was the name in Ucwalmicwts for the Whistling Rock and farm on this site. 49°58′25″N 122°26′42″W
