= Open Engagement =

- Genre: Art & Social Practice
- Frequency: Annual
- Venue: Queens Museum, 2014; Portland State University, 2010-13; University of Regina, 2007
- Years active: 2007 - Present
- Founder: Jen Delos Reyes
- Website: openengagement.info

Open Engagement is an international conference and artist project focusing on art and social practice. Directed and founded by Jen Delos Reyes in 2007, the conference incorporates workshops, exhibitions, residencies, pedagogy, curatorial practice and collaborative projects.

The conference is free of charge and has hosted over 700 presenters, taking place in two countries over the past seven years. Since the first Open Engagement conference in 2007, the event has become a locus for people interested in socially engaged art. The conference offers a primary site where practitioners convene annually to take stock of the field, playing host to artists and activists.

== History ==
=== 2007 ===
The initial conference, born out of Delos Reyes' graduate studies at the University of Regina, was hosted by the university, the Dunlop Art Gallery, The Mackenzie Art Gallery and local Regina residents from October 11–13, 2007. Each of the three days focused on a unique theme of exploration; October 11, You are all that I see: Art and everyday experience; October 12, It takes two: Collaborations, collectives, other team relationships; October 13. I'll call you: Long-term relationships, communities, and connectivity. Over 40 national and international contributors were present during this first conference. The contributors were selected through an open call for submissions, participating alongside three keynote presenters.

=== 2010 ===
In 2010 Open Engagement moved to Portland State University, planned in conjunction with the Art and Social Practice students, continuing under the leadership of Delos Reyes. The artists involved in Open Engagement: Making Things, Making Things Better, Making Things Worse, challenged traditional ideas of what art is and does. The artists' projects mediated the contemporary frameworks of art as service, as social space, as activism, as interactions, and as relationships.

Over 150 presenters were accepted through an open call for submissionS. Featured keynote presenters were Mark Dion, Nils Norman, and Amy Franceschini.

=== 2011 ===
Open Engagement 2011 explored broadly art and social practice. Through conversations, interviews, open reflection on experiences, and related projects created for or presented at the conference, five themes were examined: Peoples and Publics, Social Economies, In Between Places, Tracking and Tracing, and Sentiment and Strategies. 2011's keynote presenters were Julie Ault, Fritz Haeg, and Pablo Helguera.

In 2011 Open Engagement also played host to the Bureau for Open Culture, Bad at Sports, an exhibition by the Bruce High Quality Foundation University, and concurrent summits on art and education and social practice/participatory programs and practices arising at museums. The summits featured representatives from Otis College of Art and Design, the University of California Santa Cruz, MICA, California College of the Arts, The Walker, Portland Art Museum, The Hammer and others.

=== 2012 ===
The 2012 Open Engagement featured presentations from keynote speakers Tania Bruguera, Shannon Jackson and Paul Ramirez Jonas. The work by these artists and scholars informed the conference themes: Politics, Economies, Education, and Representation.

=== 2013 ===
Open Engagement 2013 featured keynote presenters Claire Doherty, Tom Finkelpearl, and Michael Rakowitz. They were brought together to reflect on the themes of publics, contexts, and institutions in relation to the current state of socially engaged art, education, and institutional practice.

The conference included dozens of panels, workshops, and lectures, as well as a continuation of the socially engaged art in art institutions summit as well as a public conversation with Creative Time on the roles of the Creative Time Summit and Open Engagement.

=== 2014 ===
Open Engagement 2014 featured keynote presenters J. Morgan Puett and Mierle Laderman Ukeles. These and other artists, scholars and conference participants reflected on the theme of Life/Work. In 2014 the conference became mobile and was hosted by Queens Museum in the borough of Queens, New York City.

=== 2015 ===
In 2015, Open Engagement moved to Pittsburgh to explore the themes of place and revolution. A Blade of Grass was the year's organizational partner and the conference featured keynote presentations by Emily Jacir and Rick Lowe.

=== 2016 ===
The 2016 iteration of Open Engagement took place at the Oakland Museum of California. The 2016 conference theme, POWER, was guided by the curatorial vision of René de Guzman and featured keynote speakers Angela Davis and Suzanne Lacy.

=== 2017 ===
Open Engagement 2017 took place at the University of Illinois at Chicago and a constellation of sites across the city. The conference theme JUSTICE was guided by the curatorial vision of Romi Crawford and Lisa Yun Lee. Featured presenters included Theaster Gates, Maria Gaspar, Maria Varela, Ai-jen Poo, Marisa Jahn and Laurie Jo Reynolds.
