= The Outsider Festival =

Scottish music and comedy festival

- Genre: Alternative rock, folk, indie rock, dance
- Dates: 22–24 June
- Locations: Rothiemurchus Forest, near Aviemore, Scotland
- Years active: 2007
- Website: www.outsiderfestival.co.uk

The Outsider Festival was a music and comedy festival held in 2007 in the Rothiemurchus Estate near Aviemore in the Highlands of Scotland. It was a festival with green credentials and attracted 9,000 attendees on each of the two days that it was held. It was organised by Unique Events.

The festival was held over the midsummer weekend, and was part of Highland 2007. As well as music and comedy, the festival featured outdoor activities, including a 12 km run and a mountain bike marathon.

The organisers planned for the festival to return in 2008, but in February 2008 announced a postponement until the following year. The organisers said an "international rock act" had decided not to come, and also cited funding problems and concerns over the environmental impact on the estate.

The 2009 festival was to have been part of Homecoming Scotland 2009, but the Outsider organisers announced the cancellation of their event in May, citing the economic downturn and poor ticket sales. The event was to have been headlined by Sharleen Spiteri, but it was thought only 2,000 tickets had been sold by May 2009.

== Lineup ==
In the inaugural Outsider, acts included:

- KT Tunstall
- Willy Mason
- Crowded House
- Idlewild
- Guillemots
- Capercaillie
- Peatbog Faeries
- Salsa Celtica
- King Creosote
- Blazin' Fiddles
- Shooglenifty

Comedians appearing included Michael McIntyre, Craig Hill, Karen Dunbar, Stephen K. Amos and Kevin Bridges.

The festival also included environmental debates chaired by David Steel.
