= Lana Lopesi =

New Zealand author, art critic, editor and multidisciplinary researcher

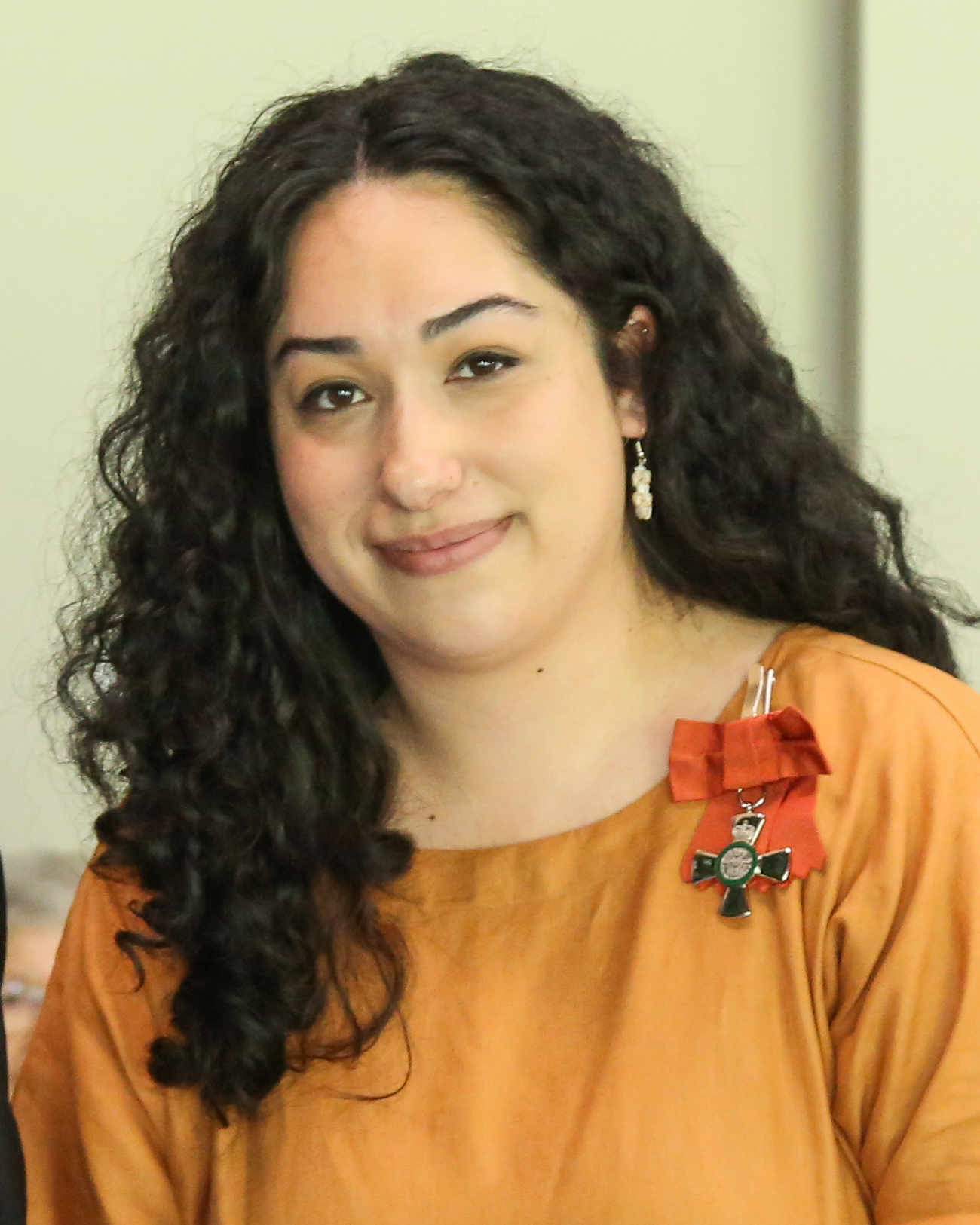
Lopesi in 2023

Alana Marissa Lopesi MNZM is a New Zealand writer and critic. She has been published in multiple places in New Zealand and Australia, and has been an editor in chief at The Pantograph Punch. Her recent book Bloody Women is a series of essays which describes her experiences as a Samoan woman living in New Zealand.

== Biography ==
Lopesi is Samoan and is from Auckland, New Zealand, and currently based in Eugene, Oregon, where she is an assistant professor at the University of Oregon.

Lopesi has been the editor for Design Assembly, where she wrote a regular column Graphic Matters. Between 2017 and 2019 Lopesi was the editor-in-chief of The Pantograph Punch, a New Zealand online magazine.

In 2018, Lopesi worked with Sarah Biscarra Dilley (yak tityu tityu yak tiłhini Northern Chumash, Chicana), Freja Carmichael (Quandamooka), Léuli Lunaʻi Eshraghi (Samoa) and Tarah Hogue (Métis, Dutch Canadian) to develop The Commute, a series of exhibitions and programs at the Institute of Modern Art in Brisbane, Australia.

In 2019, tattooist Julia Mage’au Gray created some 'tatu' on Lopesi live in front of an audience at a gallery in Auckland – there was a DJ (King Kapisi). Lopesi says, "The work of Mage'au Gray is not only about tatu revival, but the body sovereignty that comes with it."

Other places Lopesi has published in New Zealand include: Metro, North and South, Paperboy, Art New Zealand, HOME Magazine, Aotearotica, Bulletin, E-Tangata and The Spinoff. She has also published in Australian publications including Un Magazine, Broadsheet, Runway, GARAGE Magazine and VICE. Lana writes as a critic on New Zealand art and culture and has been doing this since 2012. In her book Bloody Women Lopesi writes about the 'more than multiple worlds that you need to navigate' as a Samoan woman in New Zealand.

In 2021, Lopesi obtained a PhD at the Auckland University of Technology, supervised by Albert Refiti, Layne Waerea and Tina Engels-Schwarzpaul. The title of her thesis was Moana Cosmopolitan Imaginaries: Toward an Emerging Theory of Moana Art. Lopesi lectures at the School of Art and Design at Auckland University of Technology.

In the 2023 New Year Honours, Lopesi was appointed a Member of the New Zealand Order of Merit, for services to the arts.

== Residencies ==
Lopesi has held residencies in Taipei, Taiwan and Auckland, Aotearoa New Zealand.

== Works ==
- 2018 – False Divides, book published by Bridget Williams Books
- 2019 – Transits and Returns, co-editor (Vancouver Art Gallery; Institute of Modern Art)
- 2021 – Bloody Women, published by Bridget Williams Books
- 2023 – Pacific Arts Aotearoa, published by Penguin Randomhouse
