= Nadia Lichtig =

Visual artist

Nadia Lichtig (born 1973) is an artist currently living in the South of France. In her multilayered work, voice is transposed into various media including painting, print, sculpture, photography, performance, soundscape and song. A monograph on Lichtig's work, Pictures of Nothing, was published by Kerber Verlag in 2014.

== Early life and education ==
Lichtig was born in 1973 in Munich, Germany; her parents were of Czech and Serb descent. Lichtig studied at the University of the Arts Paris. Having grown up between several countries and languages, Lichtig studied linguistics at LMU Munich in Germany, and sculpture at the Ecole des Beaux-Arts de Paris, France with Jean-Luc Vilmouth, where she graduated with honours in 2001, before assisting Mike Kelley in Los Angeles the same year.

== Work ==
In her works, each medium approached not as a field to be mastered, but as a source of possibilities to question our ability to decipher the present. Visual and aural aspects entangle in her performances. Lichtig taught at the Srishti Institute of Art, Design and Technology, Bangalore, India as a visiting professor in 2006, at the Ecole des Beaux-Arts of the Valence in 2007, and since 2009, is professor of Fine Arts at the Ecole Supérieure des Beaux-arts of Montpellier, France. She has collaborated with musicians who are also visual artists, such as Bertrand Georges (audible), Christian Bouviou (Popopfalse), Nicole (La Chatte), Nina Canal (Ut) and Michael Moorley (the dead C). Lichtig worked and works under several group names and pseudonyms including: EchoparK, Falseparklocation, Skrietch, Ghosttrap and Nanana.

Lichtig's collaborative work in Drift: Art and Dark Matter, was reviewed in the publication, Symmetry magazine.

== Publications ==
- Pictures of Nothing, Editions Voix/Richard Meier, France, 2023
- Post-Specimen, Intellect Books, Bristol, Great Britain, ed. by Ed Juler and Alistair Robinson, 2021
- Grammaires fantômes / Phantomgrammatiken, ed. by Maison de Heidelberg / Goetheinstitut, France, 2020
- Bunkern, Privater Bunkerbau an Zellen, im Kalter Krieg und in Prepper-Fanatsien by Mona Schieren in "Re-Bunkern" ed. by Kathrin von Malzahn and Mona Schieren in collaboration with Franciska Zolyorn, Argobooks, Berlin, Germany, 2019
- Phototropia, 2019, ed. by Maison de Heidelberg / Goetheinstitut, France, 2019
- Monograph: Pictures of Nothing, Kerber Verlag, Bielefeld, Germany, 2018

== Collections ==
- Centre Pompidou, Paris, France
- Hanse-Wissenschaftskolleg, Delmenhorst, Germany
- Musée d'art Contemporain, Sérignan, France
- URDLA, Lyon, France
- Terra Art Foundation, Paris/Chicago
- Collection of the Ecole Superieure des Beaux-Arts de Paris
- Fuhlbrügge & Müller collection, Germany
- Abay Maskara collection, India
- Merkel Collection, Germany

== Exhibitions ==
- 2022: Reflecting Nature Part I, Kunsthalle Erfurt, Germany
- 2022: Histoires de Silences, Galerie Anne +, Paris (France)
- 2022: Drift: Art and Dark Matter, Carleton University Art Gallery, Ottawa, Canada
- 2021: Drift: Art and Dark Matter, Agnes Etherington Art Centre, Kingston, Canada
- 2021: Drift: Art and Dark Matter, Morris and Helen Belkin Art Gallery, Vancouver, Canada
- 2021: Muj Utek, Zamek, Posnan, Poland
- 2019: Blank Spots, Schwankhalle, Bremen, Germany
- 2019: Memory Gardens, Hanse-Wissenschafts-Kolleg, Delmenhorst, Germany
- 2018: Catching the Light, cur. by Ludwig Seyfarth, Kai 10 / Arthena Foundation, Düsseldorf, Germany
- 2018: Nachtstücke (three person solo), cur. by Dr. Heidi Brunnschweiler, Galerie für Gegenwartskunst, Freiburg, Germany
- 2017: Ghosttrap, cur. by Susanne Prinz, Kunstverein am Rosa-Luxemburg-Platz, Berlin, Germany

== Awards and public space projects ==
- 2021: Residency Goethe Institut Bucharest, Romania
- 2020: Residency, Center of Astrophysics, Queen's University, Canada
- 2020: Residency, Goethe Institut, Marseille, France
- 2018-19: Residency / Fellow of the Hanse-WIssenschafts-Kolleg / Institute for Advanced Research, Germany
- 2013: Institut Francais, London, French Embassy, UK
- 2012: Collection Musée d'art contemporain de Sérignan 2011, 1% artistique, Public Art Project, Sérignian, France
- 2009: Dicream, CNC Ile-de-France, France
- 2008: Biennale de Rennes, public art project, Résidence Synagogue de Delme, France
- 2001: Terra Art Foundation, Fellowship residency
