= Sarah Biscarra-Dilley =

American artist, author, curator (born 1986)

Sarah Biscarra Dilley
- Born: 1986 (age 39–40); California, U.S.
- Education: Institute of American Indian Arts; San Francisco Art Institute; University of California, Davis
- Occupations: Artist, curator, writer
- Known for: Visual art
- Website: sarahbiscarradilley.com

Sarah Biscarra Dilley (born 1986) is a Native American interdisciplinary artist, curator, and writer from the yak titʸu titʸu yak tiłhini Northern Chumash Tribe. Much of Biscarra-Dilley's work brings focus to sexuality and gender identity, as well as racial and cultural marginalization. These themes can be found throughout all of her work, whether it be in isolation or concurrently. Her works focus on the resiliency, self-determination, and sovereignty of Indigenous populations through the collaboration and shared experiences between communities, specifically within nitspu tiłhin ktitʸu, the State of California.

Biscarra Dilley is known for her artwork within the collective art group, Black Salt Collective.

== Early life and education ==
Sarah Biscarra Dilley was born in 1986 in the Central Valley in California. She belongs to the yak titʸu titʸu yak tiłhini Northern Chumash Tribe. She lived in Oakland, California area.

She was a high school dropout. Biscarra-Dilley attended the Institute of American Indian Arts (IAIA). She later went on to obtain a B.A. degree in Urban Studies at the San Francisco Art Institute in 2015. In 2018, Biscarra-Dilley earned both an M.A. and PhD in Native American Studies from University of California, Davis.

== Career ==
Biscarra Dilley is a writer, multidisciplinary artist and language practitioner relating nitspu tiłhinktitʸu [San Luis Obispo + southern Monterey Counties, California, U.S.A.] and places joined by shared water. Their written and visual texts connect extraction and enclosure while emphasizing movement, relational landscapes and enduring presence. Biscarra-Dilley's connection to the LGBTQ+ community is shown in her participation in projects such as the group exhibit at the Toronto Free Gallery called the Emnowaangosjig – Coming Out: The Shifting and Multiple Self and the National Queer Arts Festival for numerous years.

Working through a multidisciplinary process, their writing centers California Native endurance while naming "the missions as the first carceral spaces in what is now California" and the re-integration of what they note as the "three most central sites of knowing" in their tribal community as relationships to land, extended kinships, and embodiment Their dissertation is currently being adapted to a book. They work alongside their family with tʔɨnɨsmuʔ tiłhinktitʸu, the Northern Chumash or "Obispeño" language, and serve on their tribe's core language team.

Biscarra Dilley often uses "cut paper, archival material, handwork, language, thread, found objects and various natural materials" within her artwork.

She completed various artist-in-residence programs such as the Art Writer's Tiny Residency in Portland, Oregon; the Indigenous Art Journal at the Banff Centre for Arts in Banff, Canada; and Creativity, Carrizozo Colony, Carrizozo, New Mexico, as well as multiple others. Biscarra-Dilley has been awarded numerous grants and funds for her work such as the Alternative Exposure grant (2013), the Point Foundation Scholarship (2012–2014), and the Art Matters Foundation grant (2016–2017).

Institute of Modern Art in Brisbane in 2018 invited Biscarra Dilley, among four other Indigenous curators including Leuli Luna'i Eshraghi, Freja Carmichael, Tarah Hogue, and Lana Lopesi, "to develop [The Commute] a series of exhibitions and programs in collaboration with indigenous artists."

The Facebook, Inc. headquarters in Menlo Park, California features mural work in a dining hall by Sarah Biscarra-Dilley and the Black Salt Collective.

== Exhibitions ==
Biscarra-Dilley has created several pieces with different mediums, has participated in many curatorial projects and exhibits, and has written for various publications.

- 2010: Ramona, 2007, mixed media. CHRONOTOPIA, SOMArts, San Francisco, California.
- 2016: CHRONOTOPIA: The Past, Present and Future of Queer Histories, SOMArts, San Francisco, California.
- 2016: sup, sup, sup, sup (land, ground, year, dirt). Part of the Visions into Infinite Archives exhibit, curated by Black Salt Collective, SOMArts, San Francisco, California.
- 2018: tʸiptukɨłhɨwatʸiptutʸɨʔnɨ, video collage (still). Part of The Ethical Etherealness of Fuck and Love exhibit in La Centrale Galerie Powerhouse, Montreal, Quebec, Canada.
