= Maria Hupfield =

Canadian artist

- Born: 1975 (age 50–51)
- Education: University of Toronto (BA); Sheridan College; York University (MFA)

Maria Hupfield (born 1975) is a Canadian artist and professor at the University of Toronto Mississauga. She is an Anishinaabe, specifically an Ojibwe and a member of the Wasauksing First Nation, located in Ontario, Canada. Hupfield works in a variety of media, including video and performance. Her performance practice references Anishinaabeg oral history and feminist performance history.

== Early life and education ==
Hupfield grew up in Parry Sound, Ontario. She earned both a BA from the University of Toronto and diploma from Sheridan College in art and art history in 1999, after studying in a joint program at the University of Toronto Mississauga. She also graduated with a minor in native studies from the University of Toronto, and received an MFA from York University.

== Career ==
The One Who Keeps On Giving, a 2017 solo exhibition of her work at The Power Plant in Toronto was called a "triumphal homecoming" by Murray Whyte of the Toronto Star. Other solo exhibitions include East Wind Brings a New Day at the MacKenzie Art Gallery, Regina (2015) and Strange Customs Prevail at Art Gallery of Southwestern Manitoba in 2011 and Galerie l'UQAM in Montreal in 2017.

Hupfield is the founder of 7th Generation Image Makers, an arts and mural program for Native youth in downtown Toronto. She is co-owner of Native Art Department International, with her partner Jason Lujan. From 2007 to 2011 she was Assistant Professor in Visual Art and Material Practice at Emily Carr University of Art and Design. She is the 2014 recipient of the Joan Mitchell Foundation Painting and Sculpture Grant. In 2018, Hupfield was awarded the Hnatyshyn Foundation prize for outstanding achievement by a Canadian mid-career artist.

Hupfield is currently an Assistant Professor of Indigenous Digital Arts and Performance and a Canadian Research Chair in Transdisciplinary Indigenous Arts at the University of Toronto Mississauga.
