= Native Education College =

NEC Native Education College
- Motto: Where Learners Become Leaders
- Type: Private
- Established: 1967
- Academic affiliations: CICan, VCC
- Chairperson: Edward John
- President: Tammy Harkey
- Location: Vancouver, British Columbia, Canada; 49°16′00″N 123°05′57″W
- Campus: Urban
- Website: necvancouver.org

The NEC Native Education College is a registered private aboriginal college based in Vancouver, British Columbia. It is governed by non-profit society and is a registered charitable organization.

== Partnerships ==
NEC is a member of the Indigenous Adult and Higher Learning Association (IAHLA), which was created in 2003 to represent and work on behalf of Aboriginal-controlled adult and post-secondary education institutes in British Columbia.

== Programs and courses ==
Programs and courses offered include:

- Aboriginal Adult Basic Education
- Health Care Assistant
- Aboriginal Tourism Operations
- Aboriginal Tourism Management
- Family and Community Counselling
- Early Childhood Education
- Aboriginal Justice Studies
- Applied Business Technology
- Northwest Coast Jewellery Arts

== History ==
Although NEC (formerly Native Education Centre) had existed since 1967, it was in 1979 that the society was formed to assume control and broaden the scope of education to include academic post-secondary courses. The school moved into its current facilities in 1985, a building featuring architectural features of a traditional Pacific Coast longhouse.

The Board of Directors of NEC Native Education Society made the decision to cease operations of NEC Native Education College effective July 31, 2007. This decision was overturned in late July with support of the Ministry of Advanced Education to develop a new funding formula for private Aboriginal colleges in late 2007.

== Notable alumni ==
- Lorelei Williams, indigenous activist.
