= Nocturnal Doubling =

2004 experimental short film

- Directed by: Daniel Cockburn
- Written by: Daniel Cockburn
- Produced by: Daniel Cockburn
- Narrated by: Daniel Cockburn
- Edited by: Daniel Cockburn
- Production company: ZeroFunction Productions
- Distributed by: Vtape
- Release date: 2004
- Running time: 4 minutes
- Country: Canada
- Language: English

Nocturnal Doubling is a 2004 Canadian short experimental film by video artist Daniel Cockburn based on a thought experiment in Henri Poincaré's essay The Relativity of Space.

Screenshot and quote from the short. Today I woke up certain, as certain as any one could ever be about anything, and I knew that everything had doubled in size overnight. ——Nocturnal Doubling

== Plot ==
As a metred beat thumps, and a metred line is pulled across the screen, a narrator asserts with certainty that the entire universe expanded to twice its size overnight. The narrator considers whether this might have any effects on perception or motion. Images follow. A sneaker on pavement, trees, a brick wall — all appear to be the same. The pull of the metre across the screen doubles, and its twin pushes the other way to the same beat.

The narrator decides that there can be no measurable effect of this nocturnal doubling, since no meaningful measurements could be taken if everything everywhere had expanded proportionately and at the same time. Any and all information would be undetectable — even by God, since God, too, must be twice as great as before. Despite this, somehow, the narrator knows it has happened: "My knowledge was correct, and... I knew nothing. The change had definitely occurred, and it made not one bit of difference. I decided to keep it to myself."

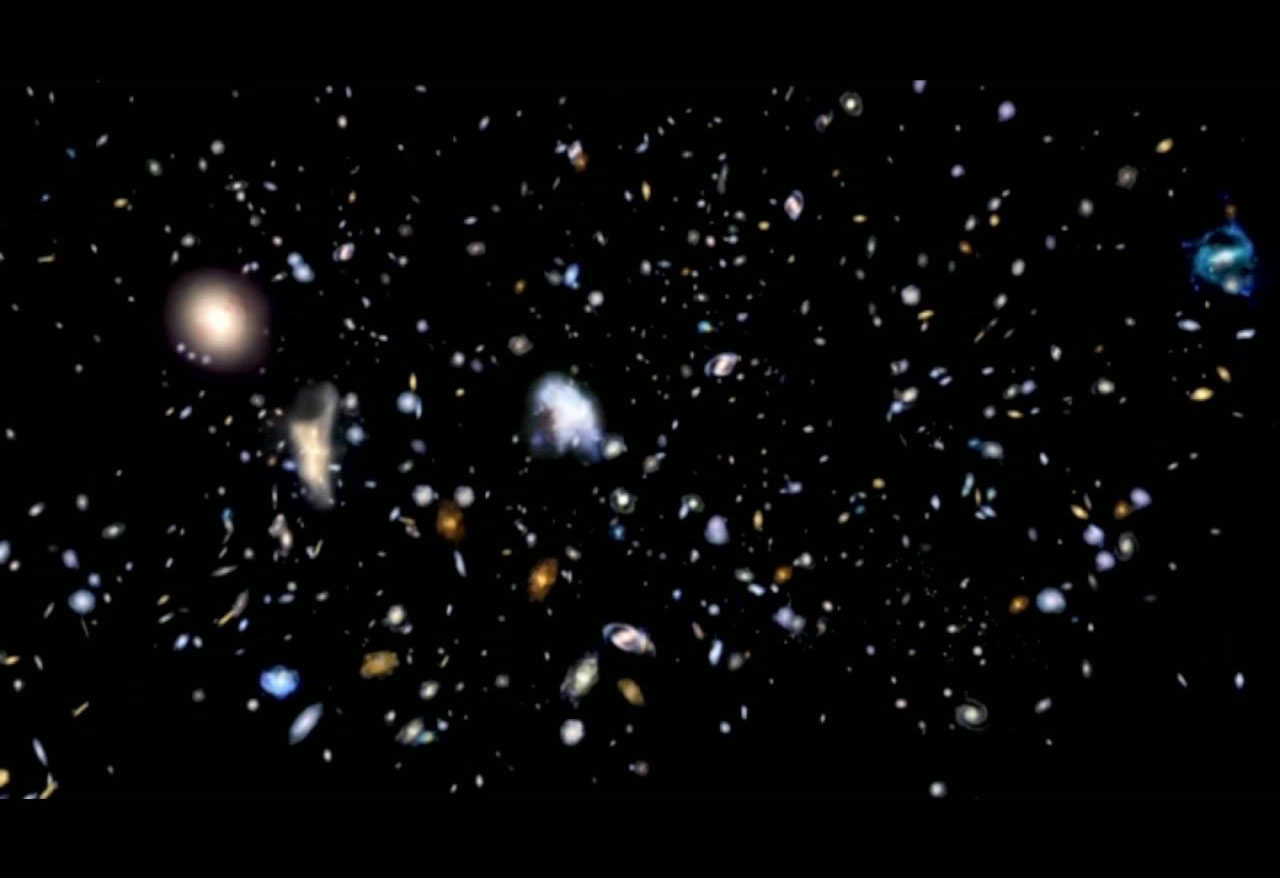
Suppose that in one night all the dimensions of the universe became a thousand times larger. The world will remain similar to itself... Only, what was formerly a metre long will now measure a kilometre, and what was a millimetre long will become a metre... When I awake in the morning what will be my feeling in face of such an astonishing transformation? Well, I shall not notice anything at all. The most exact measures will be incapable of revealing anything of this tremendous change... In reality it would be better to say that as space is relative, nothing at all has happened, and that it is for that reason that we have noticed nothing. ——Henri Poincaré, The Relativity of Space

== Inspiration, genre, and themes ==
The concept of the universe doubling overnight is ultimately based on a thought experiment by French theoretical physicist Henri Poincaré in his essay The Relativity of Space.

Both media artist and critic Mike Hoolboom and Erik Martinson, curator of an exhibition featuring Nocturnal Doubling, refer to the short in reference to science fiction, Martinson interpreting the narrator's intuition of an undetectably expanded universe as the "nervous pang" of an "extra-sense".

=== Empiricism and epistemology ===
Martinson discusses Daniel Cockburn's narration mainly in philosophical terms: it is "a series of exploratory gestures and thoughts in this new yet strangely similar world", in which empiricism is itself tested, "secured by the senses and questioned by the restless mind."

Something does not compute. If "no measurements could be taken" given the spontaneous growth of absolutely everything—the sameness is unnervingly all encompassing—how does the mind know?

=== The artist and the God complex ===
Mike Hoolboom discusses the theme of the media artist as God as an idea found in a number of Daniel Cockburn's short works such as WEAKEND: "In order to be a media artist, one must be God, the father, the one who controls. Or else one is the son, the subject, the controlled." The narrator of Nocturnal Doubling likewise compares himself to God, "the first and last measurement, or ruler."

== Production ==
=== Background ===
The mid-2000s were an especially productive period for Cockburn, who made several short films or videos a year during this stage of his career. The year Nocturnal Doubling was produced, he also made Chicken/Egg, Continuity, Stupid Coalescing Becomers and Figure vs. Ground, the latter a collaboration with Emily Vey Duke.

=== Commission ===
Shot on video, Nocturnal Doubling was created for a project commissioned by Friends of Rage Productions in which a one-word theme ("giants") was drawn from a hat, and participants were given half an hour to write a script, and then an hour immediately after to shoot, and finally "a 24-hour period later on to edit."

== Release and reception ==
Nocturnal Doubling was released in 2004.

=== Anthology film ===
Beginning in 2009, Nocturnal Doubling began to be shown along with a selection of Cockburn's other films, under the collective title You Are In a Maze of Twisty Little Passages, All Different, the actual programme varying with the venue.

=== Home media ===
A 55-minute DVD (for exhibitions and educational institutions) of one version of the anthology film was released in 2009.

=== Critical response ===
On the purely visual level, Hoolboom notes Cockburn's montage consists of deliberately banal images, "indifferently shot and largely illustrative of the voice-over" to emphasize the fact that, to all appearances and for all practical purposes, nothing has changed.

Norman Wilner notes that as is typical of him, Cockburn's narrator is both prankster and serious inquisitor, calmly offering philosophical and metaphysical insights while his thesis plays out on the screen; "there's no way anything he's talking about is even plausible, let alone probable, but he's going to explore the possibilities as if it were."

Treating the narrator exclusively as a persona, Martinson remarks that he is both rattled by and curious about the uniquely private and perturbing knowledge that he has mysteriously acquired, and, if we take the narrator at his word, a universal expansion is reducible to "a blip in the order of things, barely perceptable." The narrator is certain about what happened and yet nervous about it at the same time, aware that the "residue" of the event exists "only in this mind" in the form of a "barely sensed sense" which, having happened once, may happen again.

== See also ==
- Metronome, an earlier video by Cockburn that makes use of a regular beat
- WEAKEND, an earlier video by Cockburn in which a video artist has godlike powers
