= Daniel Cockburn =

Canadian filmmaker and performance artist

Daniel Ernest Cockburn
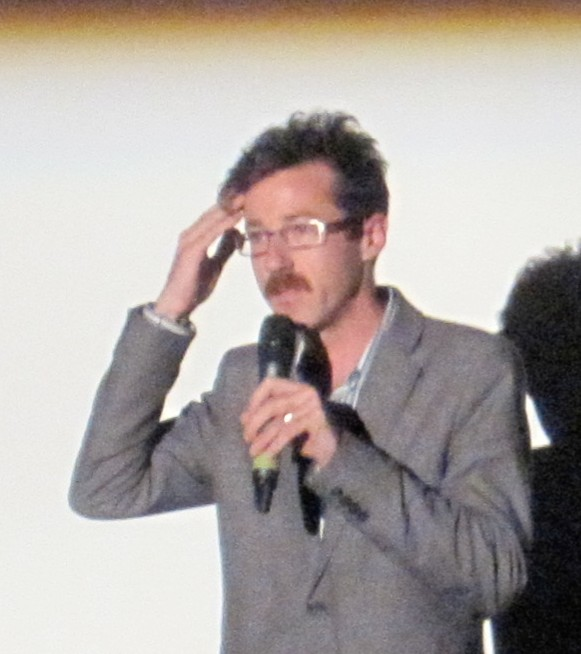
- Daniel Cockburn at TIFF 2010
- Born: 1976 (age 49–50); Belleville, Ontario, Canada
- Education: York University (B.F.A., M.F.A.)
- Occupations: Video artist; film director; performance artist; professor
- Years active: 1999–present
- Notable work: The Other Shoe (2001); Metronome (2002); The Impostor (hello goodbye) (2003); Denominations (2003); WEAKEND (2003); Nocturnal Doubling (2004); All The Mistakes I've Made (2009); You Are Here (2010); All The Mistakes I've Made (Part 2) (2015)); The Argument (with annotations) (2017); God's Nightmares (2019)
- Awards: K.M. Hunter Artists Award; Jay Scott Prize; EMAF Award; Pitch This! prize (Telefilm Canada)
- Website: zerofunction.com

Daniel Ernest Cockburn is a Canadian performance artist, film director and video artist. Cockburn won the Jay Scott Prize in 2010 and the European Media Art Festival's principal award in 2011 for his debut feature film You Are Here.

== Education and career in video and filmmaking ==
=== Early short films and videos (1999–2007) ===
I think I know how I justify asking people to give up their time to watch my work - I try to entertain them... I think that thinking is entertaining.

— Daniel Cockburn (interview, October 2003)

Born in Belleville, Ontario, Cockburn grew up in Tweed. He graduated from York University with a Bachelor of Fine Arts in film studies in 1999, but felt "dissatisfied with his own final project", a 17-minute film that took him six months to finish; he decided to "abandon all that stuff", meaning big film productions heavy on stage design and light design, with sound engineers and a production manager, "in order to make much simpler films based on his own writing." He discovered the experimental film community in Toronto "and beyond," spending a decade making short films and video projects, which were "experimental, but which always had a strong narrative bent."

The first video Cockburn directed after graduation, Doctor Virtuous, about a troubled fruit fly researcher plagued by existential worries and anxiety concerning his supposed nemesis Doctor Wrong, was shot over 24 hours in the summer of 1999 on a budget of about $500 for the 4th On The Fly Festival.

He has a rare literary talent which he serves up with visual élan, smart design sense and a playful philosophical project whose deeply lived roots is leavened throughout with humour. In fact, he's most serious when he's having fun. And even though his work appears as audio-visual feuilletons—essayistic briefs, missives from the margins—they possess an uncanny narrative order (though it is a narrativity steeped in the twentieth century, not the nineteenth).

— Mike Hoolboom

Cockburn released around three to six videos a year between 2000 and 2004. Metronome (2002) was his "breakout hit", attracting significant attention, an award, and an honourable mention. In 2003, Cameron Bailey declared Cockburn was "Toronto's best new video artist". Cockburn won more prizes for WEAKEND and Denominations the same year. In 2004, he worked in collaboration with Emily Vey Duke on Figure Vs. Ground, and re-edited and released one of his earlier works in 2005.

Cockburn usually appeared in his own films, not exactly playing himself, but enacting the main (or only) character of his script: "I am interested in this blank face without emotions. It becomes a projection surface for anything that happens in the film, like the Kuleshov Effect", referring to the early Russian filmmaker who showed that the same head-shot could express different emotions according to adjunct edits in the film and he thus had a strong influence on Sergei Eisenstein's theory of montage. "And I decided I could do that myself; I didn't need an actor to make the kinds of films I wanted to make". Sometimes, as in The Impostor (hello goodbye) (2003), he played multiple roles, or different aspects of the same role, which were also in some sense fictionalized versions of himself: "I often perform in the work, in a mode that I started calling 'somewhere between fictional character and autobiography' when people started saying, 'that's not actually the way you think, is it?'" Alissa Firth-Eagland, who curated an exhibition featuring his work in 2005, highlighted this feature of his art:

Daniel Cockburn's videos are cleverly self-referential without being didactic. They are deliberately sleek and crafted, even produced, but it is Cockburn's performances within these productions that intrigue me most; his personae are disconcerting in their honesty and familiarity. I find there are many blind spots for me in all his onscreen characterizations. A notable mutability of portrayer and portrayed is evident in particular in his work The Impostor (hello goodbye): there's a mysterious blurring of fact and fiction. I am always left wondering how much of his onscreen personalities are, in fact, him.

Cockburn admits that "over the years, his main characters became more and more influenced by autobiographical ideas."

=== Anthology and debut feature (2008–2010) ===
In 2008, Cockburn won the K.M. Hunter Artists Award for Film & Video ($8,000), A video of Cockburn commenting on a few of his films, with clips, was released. He began working on his first feature film that year.

==== You Are In a Maze of Twisty Little Passages, All Different (2009) ====
In 2009, Cockburn was one of three directors invited to a six-month fellowship in Berlin (DAAD Artists-in-Berlin Program). He returned to Toronto toward the end of the year with a curated programme of his films and videos, to launch a publication about his work. The program included The Chinese Room, a ten-minute work-in-progress excerpt from his upcoming feature. Norman Wilner wrote a brief retrospective review of Cockburn's work prior to the event:

Cockburn's work is strange and recursive and curious and enthralling, and sometimes all at once. In works like Metronome and The Impostor (hello goodbye), he considers life, death and dreams - and dreams about death - with a childlike fascination and an adult's sense of gravity. He'll ponder the collective illusion of time in Stupid Coalescing Becomers, or investigate his suspicion that everything in the universe has doubled in size overnight in the aptly titled Nocturnal Doubling. Calmly offering philosophical and metaphysical insights on the audio track, while evidence of his thesis plays out on the screen, he's both prankster and serious inquisitor; there's no way anything he's talking about is even plausible, let alone probable, but he's going to explore the possibilities as if it were.

==== You Are Here (2010) ====
Cockburn's first feature film has been presented at over forty film festivals worldwide, and compared to the works of Charlie Kaufman, Jorge Luis Borges, and Philip K. Dick. The film won both the Jay Scott Prize in 2010, and the EMAF Award in 2011, and with few exceptions, was received enthusiastically by critics. Marcos Ortega de Mon noted that in the film, finding and archiving material plays a big role in the narration:

The activity of collecting seems to be a trap and source of obsession, but in other respects, it may also be a base for resistance, an escape from those powers that seem to have control over the claustrophobic situations his protagonists find themselves in, not only in the feature film but also in his shorts.

=== Graduate studies and overseas residencies projects (2010–present) ===
Following the release of You Are Here and the short The Bad Idea Reunion, Cockburn participated in the National Parks Project, visiting Bruce Peninsula National Park with musicians John K. Samson, Christine Fellows and Sandro Perri, and also had two brief stints overseas as an artist-in-residence and a guest professor. (Note: At the Impakt Festival in Utrecht in late November and early December 2010, Cockburn was the festival's artist in residence, and again as part of the European Media Artists in Residence Exchange. Over 2011 and 2012, Cockburn was a guest professor at the Braunschweig University of Art.)

Cockburn's feature film script The Engineers won the Telefilm Canada Pitch This! prize ($15,000) at the 2013 Toronto International Film Festival, and was reported as in development with the Canadian Film Centre. In 2014, Cockburn returned to York University to begin working towards his Master of Fine Arts degree. During this period, he made the short films Sculpting Memory (2015) and The Argument (with annotations) (2017), the latter of which was also presented as his master's thesis, and made the Toronto International Film Festival's annual Canada's Top Ten list in 2017. He began a second Acme residency, "Mind the Gap", in Glasgow, in 2023.

By the time The Argument was released, Cockburn had begun an artist-in-residenceship at Acme Studios and research fellowship at the Queen Mary University of London's School of Languages, Linguistics and Film in its pilot year. The Argument, along with his most recent short films, including God's Nightmares, are Canadian-British co-productions or else British productions. During the residency, Cockburn researched the extension of lecture-performance practice into an expanded-cinema format involving multiple projections and live video feeds.

=== Related pursuits and professional affiliations ===
Cockburn curates film and video and is a member of the Pleasure Dome programming collective, writing for their publication A Blueprint for Moving Images in the 21st Century. He has also contributed to publications such as Year Zero One Forum and Cinema Scope magazine.

== Performance art ==
=== Early performances (2005–2007) ===
In March 2005, Cockburn presented Visible Vocals, a typing performance for Feats, might, a night of performance art by video artists curated by Alissa Firth-Eagland, presented by Fado and the Museum of Contemporary Canadian Art. In 2007, a set of two books and a CD was published by Parasitic Ventures Press "to replicate the performance in book form."

ALTOGETHER is an ensemble performance of music, movement, and monologue produced with the participation of York University students in 2007, the work explores "semantic/somatic overlap and overload". It was also made into an installation art work as a commission from the university Art Gallery.

=== Performances on mistakes and failure (2009–present) ===
==== All The Mistakes I've Made ====
During his Berlin residency in 2009, Cockburn developed an anti-artist talk, also called a "lecture-performance" about his professional mistakes as an artist, technical, aesthetic, and ideological. "The art world is bursting with events where artists present an anthology of the highlights of their career to a slightly bored audience." Cockburn decided to turn this idea on its head with All The Mistakes I've Made, examining to what extent his own inability to properly judge is representative of a "negative trend" in contemporary art and cinema, and supporting this argument with excerpts from his own work, and that of artists like Andrei Tarkovsky and Tim Burton. The performance toured internationally, described in 2013 as "both playful and profound, personal and wide-reaching in its meditation on creative misguidance." Cockburn performed All The Mistakes I've Made from 2009 to 2013.

• All The Mistakes I've Made (Part 2)

Sometimes also featuring a subtitle (How Not To Watch a Film) or alternate title (How Not to Watch a Movie), the performance is not, despite the titular suggestion, strictly follow up but a spiritual successor: "an independent, stand-alone work." It begins as a look at 1990s horror movies before "spinning off into an autobiographical journey full of film references, over-interpretation and paranoia." Cockburn also argues against finding fault with continuity errors, as he says in an essay derived from the performance:

Both Mistakes performance lectures have been presented to "much acclaim."

==== Heist Gone Wrong ====
In 2014, Cockburn put together a performance about failure, Heist Gone Wrong, which opened for the It wasn't supposed to be like this exhibition at Videofag in Toronto. The exhibition embraces "the messy, mistaken, or misshapen," and "explores how we might learn more from the times when things didnt work out, than from those times that they did."

== Current projects ==
As of late 2019, Cockburn is adapting Mark Vonnegut's memoir The Eden Express into a feature screenplay, and developing a new one-man multi-screen live show called "All of the Other Agains", which was scheduled to premiere at the Flatpack Festival in Birmingham in 2020.

== Personal life ==
In a number of interviews, Cockburn said that he struggled with a paranoid-delusional breakdown during which "everything I saw, read, and heard was some sort of message to me that needed to be decoded." It was a period of "intense meaning-making ... I'd be looking at any text I'd encounter like a menu or road sign and I'd scramble the letters around and see if there were any different codes there that needed to be deciphered." After a long time, he realized that this behaviour, which was emotionally exhausting and troubling, had emotional underpinnings: "It became something that wasn't just an enjoyable intellectual play. ... In a number of ways I worked through it, and part of that was figuring out what the emotional reasons were." That experience "stayed" with him and worked its way into "just about everything" he wrote or directed, including his first feature film:

You Are Here is a compendium of characters dealing with the question of whether their life is just a series of random events, or whether there’s some "Great Code" at the heart of it all. It's a cerebral concept, but when you're in the middle of it, it's scary and exciting and sometimes even funny, and that, for me, is the heart of the movie.

During postscreening question-and-answer sessions for You Are Here, audiences often asked Cockburn what is religious beliefs were, and he answered: "I don't know."

Daniel Cockburn is currently living in London, recently as a Research Fellow in Film Practice at Queen Mary University of London and on an Acme Studios residency.

Cockburn has called fellow video artist Lia Matthew Brown a friend. When Brown made a work for the One Minute Film & Video Festival titled This Thing Is Bigger Than the Both of Us: The Secret of String (2007), and would not tell Cockburn what it was about, he made one of his own with a view to hazarding a guess. Both were shown together at a screening of Cockburn's anthology film in Toronto by Pleasure Dome in 2009.

== Accolades ==
The following two lists should not be considered complete or up to date.

=== Awards and mentions ===
- Images Festival, Homebrew Award (honorable mention): Metronome / The Other Shoe, 2002
- Media City 9, Jury Prize Best Canadian Work, Metronome, 2003
- Tranz Tech International Media Art Biennial, famefame Jury Prize: WEAKEND, 2003
- One Minute Film & Video Festival, Special Jury Prize: Denominations, 2003
- Ontario Arts Council, K.M. Hunter Artists Award (Film & Video), 2008
- Toronto Film Critics Association Awards 2010, Jay Scott Prize, You Are Here
- 24th European Media Art Festival, EMAF Award You Are Here, 2011
- Telefilm Canada, Pitch This! Award, The Engineers film script, 2013
- 42nd Toronto International Film Festival • Canada's Top Ten, The Argument (with annotations), 2018 (selected in 2017)

=== Residencies and grants ===
- Trinity Square Video, "Fraternité" Residency: Brother Tongue, 2006
- DAAD Artists-in-Berlin Program, filmmaker residency, 2009
- Centre For Art Tapes (Halifax), artist in residence, 2010
- Impakt Foundation (Utrecht), artist in residence, 2011; European Media Artists Residency Exchange, artist in residence, 2015
- Ontario Arts Council, Chalmers Arts Fellowship, 2012
- Canada Council for the Arts, Screenwriting Grant, 2014; International Residencies Grant, 2017
- Acme Studios, London, Associate Artist Residency, 2017; Alumni Artist Residency, 2019
- Queen Mary University of London, Research Fellow, Film Practice, 2017

== Filmography, installations and performances ==
=== Films and videos ===
Early short films and videos (1999–2007) (Note: Based primarily on a chronological list compiled by Mike Hoolboom.)

- Doctor Virtuous (1999)
- Rocket Man (2000)
- The Other Shoe (2001, commissioned by LIFT)
- monopedal Joy (2001)
- IdeaL (2002)
- You Are in a Maze of Twisty Little Passages, all Different (2002, produced for the Trinity Square Video "Devil Music" artist residency)
- Metronome (2002)
- i hate video (2002)
- PSYCHO / 28 X 2 (2002)
- Subteranea Gargantua (prelude) (2002)
- The Impostor (hello goodbye) (2003, commissioned by Vtape for The Colin Campbell Sessions)
- WEAKEND (2003, commissioned by famefame)
- Denominations (2003)
- AUDIT (2003; second version, 2005)
- Figure vs. Ground (2004, with Emily Vey Duke, commissioned by the 640 480 video collective for the VS. programme)
- Nocturnal Doubling (2004, commissioned by Friends of Rage Productions)
- Chicken/Egg: The Williams Equation (2004)
- Continuity (2004, part of the 2004 Charles Street Video / Images Festival Fear Factory Residency)
- Stupid Coalescing Becomers (2004)
- Brother Tongue/Langue Fraternelle (2006, for the Trinity Square Video "Fraternité" Residency)
- This Thing is Bigger Than the Both of Us: These Are Facts (2007)

Anthology, feature, and later short films (2009–present)

- You Are In a Maze of Twisty Little Passages, All Different: Films and Videos by Daniel Cockburn (2009; ten of the above titles)
- You Are Here (2010)
- The Bad Idea Reunion (2010, for the TIFF Talent Lab)
- Material (2011, commissioned by the National Parks Project)
- My Godfather (2011, Impakt residency)
- Sculpting Memory (2015, commissioned by the National Film Board)
- The Argument (with annotations) (2017; master's thesis)
- Repeat Viewing (After Hours) (2017)
- Pattern Recognition (2017, video essay commissioned by BFI Digital)
- Correspondence 1989-1999 (2019, British Film Institute)
- God's Nightmares (2019)
- Ahead of the Curve (2024), commissioned by Film and Video Umbrella
- The Invocation and The Abjuration (2024), commissioned as a pair by Weird Weekend Cult Film Festival

=== Performances and installations ===
==== Performances ====
- Visible Vocals (2005)
- ALTOGETHER (2007)
- All The Mistakes I've Made (2009; Part 2, 2015)
- Heist Gone Wrong (2014)
- All the Other Agains (scheduled for 2020)

==== Installations ====
- ALTOGETHER (single-channel video), Art Gallery of York University (2007)
- I Can Feel It (3-channel video), Art Gallery of York University (2015, commissioned by AGYU Vitrines)

== Select publications ==
=== Book ===
- Visible Vocals. Parasitic Ventures Press, 2007. 2 volumes and a CD.

=== Essays ===
- Untitled. Pleasure Dome presents Apotheoses of Everything, 2003.
- "ExperiMental." Point of View 54, 2004.
