= Stupid Coalescing Becomers =

2004 experimental short film

Stupid Coalescing Becomers.
- Directed by: Daniel Cockburn
- Written by: Daniel Cockburn
- Produced by: Daniel Cockburn
- Starring: Daniel Cockburn
- Edited by: Daniel Cockburn
- Production company: ZeroFunction Productions
- Distributed by: Vtape
- Release date: 2004
- Running time: 2 minutes
- Country: Canada
- Language: English

Stupid Coalescing Becomers (with a full stop included in the title on screen, as Stupid Coalescing Becomers.) is a 2004 Canadian short darkly comic experimental film by video artist Daniel Cockburn about time running backwards as an act of rebellion.

== Synopsis ==
Screenshot from Stupid Coalescing Becomers.

An artist (Daniel Cockburn) witnesses strange happenings even as a continuous narration (Daniel Cockburn in voice-over) lashes out at "stupid coalescing becomers" in those secret places of the world where the arrow of time flies backwards. The "little opposite rebellions" in which paper uncuts, cigarettes unsmoke, broken lightbulbs re-integrate, and so on. Finally even the artist himself disappears in a backwards leap, undone, along with the narrator's "moral diatribe".

== Cast ==
- Daniel Cockburn as an artist and a narrator in voice-over (who may or may not be the same being)

== Themes, genre, and interpretations ==
Stupid Coalescing Becomers foregrounds our awareness of time through its reversal. Norman Wilner suggests Cockburn "ponders the collective illusion of time" in this film, while Mike Hoolboom calls it a "backwards time fantasy", or "a home brewed science fiction short". The "rub" of the film, as Hoolboom puts it, is the inevitability of the forward flow of time.

Cockburn is "not afraid of being funny" and he finds ideas amusing; but in his hands, "funny" is "only the other side of terror." As Norman Wilner remarks:

Calmly offering philosophical and metaphysical insights on the audio track, while evidence of his thesis plays out on the screen, he's both prankster and serious inquisitor: theres no way anything he's talking about is even plausible, let alone probable, but he's going to explore the possibilities as if it were.

In an interview with Hoolboom, Cockburn asserts that the narrator's identity in the short is ambiguous, even when the artist flies out of the frame: "it's uncertain (unless you know me) as to whether this body is the narrator's or whether it belongs to one of the Becomers". As for who the Becomers are, beings who think they can avoid cause-and-effect temporarily (futilely in the narrator's opinion), the act of reversing time for themselves fits with what Cockburn calls Hoolboom's implied definition of "video artists/audiences as willful self-oblivionizers".

== Production ==
=== Background ===
The mid-2000s were an especially productive period for Cockburn, who made several short films or videos a year during this stage of his career. The year Becomers was produced, he also made Chicken/Egg, Continuity, Figure vs. Ground, and Nocturnal Doubling, the latter a collaboration with Emily Vey Duke.

=== Inspiration and writing ===
The inspiration for the short came from a conversation between Cockburn and Jeremy Rigsby at the Images Festival in Toronto, asking him if he had heard of a Super 8 film called Smartbomb, Rigsby replying that there were too many experimental films called Smartbomb, and someone should make one with the opposite title, the two of them gradually arriving at the conclusion that the opposite of an "exploder" (a smartbomb) would be a "becomer":

We both agreed that someone should make a film or video called Stupid Coalescing Becomers., and I thought it would be lovely and hilarious if I could present him with a VHS tape containing said movie before he went home at festival's end. So I made the movie that weekend, adding the period to the title for greater assertive effect, the three-word phrase having taken on a definitive insulting third-person tendency) and gave him the VHS tape on closing night.

In developing the concept for the work, "backwardness" seemed a natural starting point, though Cockburn was "leery" because he had seen or heard about several experimental videos making use of backwards footage "that year alone" (M Station Backward, FF/REV were two he had seen). "So I think the voice-over grew out of a tendency to chastise them and myself for using a device that, let's face it, has been around long before that guy backwards-sang "What a Wonderful World" on America's Funniest People".

=== Filming and editing ===
Shot over a weekend in front of his home in Toronto, the apparent reversal of time is achieved through "fairly standard backwards footage", according to Cockburn, who filmed the final shot repeatedly and eventually hurt his knees, aching for days. Cockburn said he thought about re-editing and re-recording the voice-over for a year and a half and no longer remembers whether he made any changes before mastering it digitally: "I probably didn't".

== Release and reception ==
The short was released in 2004. Its Western Canadian premiere took place in Victoria, British Columbia, at the 7th annual Antimatter Underground Film Festival on 23 September 2004. A little over a year later, it was screened at the Rendezvous with Madness Film Festival (Toronto), which shows works on mental illness, in November 2005.

Stupid Coalescing Becomers was screened at the Code Red Green Blue exhibition at the Ed Video Gallery with other short works thematically questioning the "veracity of video", paranoia and conspiracy theory in December 2008.

=== Anthology film ===
Beginning in 2009, Stupid Coalescing Becomers began to be shown along with a selection of Cockburn's other films, under the collective title You Are In a Maze of Twisty Little Passages, All Different, the actual programme varying with the venue.

=== Home media ===
A 55-minute DVD (for exhibitions and educational institutions) of one version of the anthology film was released in 2009.

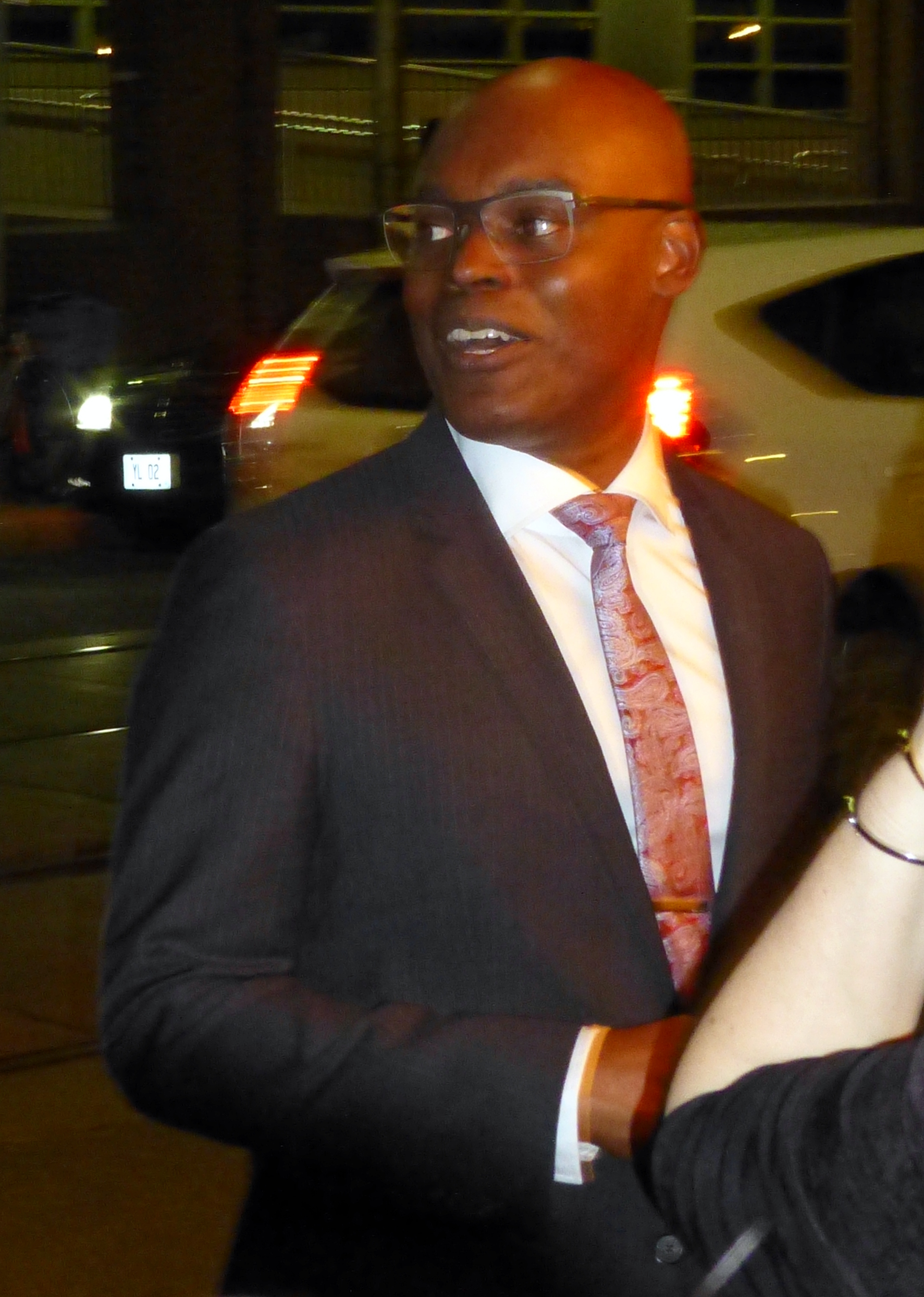
Cameron Bailey

=== Critical response ===
Declaring that Daniel Cockburn was "Toronto's best new video artist", TIFF's Cameron Bailey called Stupid Coalescing Becomers a "comic-formalist gem."

Norman Wilner finds pieces like Becomers, along with Nocturnal Doubling revealed Cockburn to be a "maturing" artist still "capable of connecting" to his adolescence as a geek.

Mike Hoolboom calls Stupid Coalescing Becomers a concise and witty film "delivered in a deadpan monologue of mock exasperation" and the short's final image, the artist flying out of the frame by way of a simple jump off his porch is a sight gag "worthy of the old comics". That the short is also a home movie, "made for nothing but the time it took to dream it all up", Hoolboom says, is a tribute to Cockburn's ingenuity.
