= The Argument (With Annotations) =

2017 experimental short film

- Directed by: Daniel Cockburn
- Written by: Daniel Cockburn
- Produced by: Lesley Johnson; Dan Montgomery
- Starring: Clare Coulter
- Cinematography: Nikolay Michaylov
- Edited by: Daniel Cockburn
- Production company: ZeroFunction Productions
- Distributed by: Vtape
- Release date: 8 September 2017 (TIFF)
- Running time: 20 minutes
- Countries: Canada; United Kingdom
- Language: English

The Argument (With Annotations) is a 2017 Canadian-British short experimental drama film written, directed, and edited by video artist Daniel Cockburn. The short's first half attempts to deceive the audience into thinking it is a non-fictional video essay, revealing itself mid-way to be a work of fiction, the essay actually the work of the film's protagonist, an elderly professor (Clare Coulter). Submitted as Cockburn's thesis for the degree of Master of Fine Arts in Film studies at York University, the film had its world premiere at the 42nd Toronto International Film Festival, and has been warmly received by critics.

== Synopsis ==
The film begins with an "appropriated-footage essay" about metaphor and the suspension of disbelief, the unseen narrator's line of thought taking the audience "on a jagged path" past the works of T. S. Eliot, Groucho Marx, John Carpenter, and Terence Davies, featuring clips from numerous films ranging from The Shining to 300. when "something else" happens: the film is actually a work of fiction. The "argument" made in the first half's video essay is by the film's female protagonist, a septuagenarian professor.

The film's second half follows the professor's own life, her daily routine: doing errands, having dinner with her husband, all the while, she is unable to stop thinking about her essay. Written notes appear on screen as she begins to refine her theories and question the accuracy of some of the points she has made.

I like to say "it's a video essay about how metaphor might operate in moving images compared to in language... until it becomes something else." If pressed, I say "and then it suddenly turns into a short film about a woman who has a shitty dinner date with her husband."

— Daniel Cockburn

== Cast ==
- Clare Coulter
- Robin Benger

== Themes, analysis, and interpretations ==
Michael Sicinski recognizes the first half of the film as the type of "theory film" as produced in the 1970s, in the "heyday" of journals like Screen and Ciné-tracts. Calum Marsh observes that the film applies lofty Wittgensteinian language games to metaphors in cinema and television, and then "it pivots sharply, and becomes instead a character study of a college lecturer with a lot on her mind", an effect "common to all of Cockburn's work: ever restless, he aspires principally to challenge and surprise." Sicinski suggests the film "shares traces" in particular with the filmmaker's 2010 feature, You Are Here. C. J. Prince agrees, but is more explicit:

Toying with cinema, language, and time, the first half essentially functions as a video essay laying out the professor's argument. The film's second half is almost the inverse, turning the camera on the professor's own life, which seems to lack any sort of meaning or metaphor whatsoever. Cockburn's film, much like You Are Here, revels in ambiguity; bringing up questions with no answers, it creates a space where various ideas bounce around freely.

The audience, "thinking they are watching an appropriated-footage piece, has the rug pulled out from underneath them when they find that they are watching a fiction film". The now "hybrid" film makes further demands through the inclusion of the onscreen annotations: they may be interpreted as the professor's running internal monologue or as her written notes (aide-mémoire), among other possibilities, but regardless, they require "multiple viewings just to decipher it all."

The short explores the intersection between research and creativity in a way which calls into question its own narrator's authority. The professor questions her own argument, thereby parodically and poetically disrupting her own academic discourse. Questioning the authority of philosophical discourse, the film examines and repositions philosophical sites of activity, foregrounding the esoteric linguistic conventions of exclusivity. Jamie Dunn suggests that while the film is a "sly critique on the nature of using film images out of context" to prove an intellectual point, it is also a subtle examination of memory and ageing. Similarly, Sicinski notes that the film also "subtly examines social mobility, the frailty of the body and mind, and the written note as an aide memoire against the fallibility of aging memory".

== Production ==
=== Background ===
Cockburn completed his first feature, You Are Here (2010), the success of which led to brief stints overseas as an artist-in-residence and a guest professor. (Note: At the Impakt Festival in Utrecht in late November and early December 2010, Cockburn was the festival's artist in residence, as part of the European Media Artists in Residence Exchange. Over 2011 and 2012, Cockburn was a guest professor at the Braunschweig University of Art.) Cockburn returned to York University to begin working towards his Master of Fine Arts degree in 2014, making the short films Sculpting Memory (2015) and The Argument (With Annotations), the latter also being submitted as his master's thesis. The same year (2017), Cockburn had begun an artist-in-residency and a research fellowship at the Queen Mary University of London's School of Languages, Linguistics and Film in its pilot year. The short is considered a Canadian-British co-production.

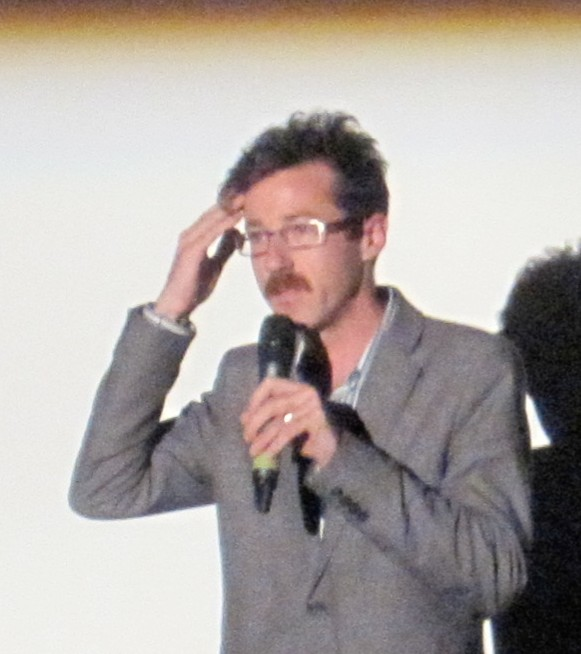
Daniel Cockburn

=== Writing and filming ===
Cockburn originally conceived of the project as a "lecture-performance," like All the Mistakes I've Made:

As I worked on it I realized I'd prefer to make it a short film, and to cast someone else in the speaking role. Because it is essentially two films back-to-back, I needed to give the first one time to develop, for the audience to sink into it; then I needed the second half to be of a pretty similar duration.

As the edit progressed, "get it under 20" became Cockburn's goal, "in the back of my mind — mainly psychological": 19 minutes felt like a lot less than 20 minutes, "the way 99 cents feels way less than a dollar"; he was also aware of "not wanting to scare off festival programmers."

== Release and reception ==
The Argument (With Annotations) premiered at the 42nd Toronto International Film Festival, as the first film in the Short Cuts Programme, on 8 September 2017. Two months later, it was screened at a sold-out show at Depth of Field, a semi-annual event showcasing recent York University CMA graduate thesis films in November, at the Art Gallery of Ontario. The short was selected for the 2017 Canada's Top Ten minifestival and screened on 14 January 2018, along with a Canadian Open Vault free screening of Cockburn's 2010 feature film, You Are Here.

The short had its American premiere at the Museum of the Moving Image in Astoria, New York, the First Look Festival, on 15 January 2018, where it was misleadingly billed as a "free-associative interrogation and exemplification of metaphors and their meaning", in an attempt to avoid spoiling the film for the audience.

The European premiere took place on 5 May 2018 at the Tower Mill Cinema in Hawick as a double-bill with The Rare Event, an experimental docufiction film by Ben Rivers and Ben Russell, at the Alchemy Film & Moving Image Festival. The two films played together in the UK and Ireland.

=== Critical response ===
Norman Wilner, writing for Now Toronto, describes The Argument (With Annotations) as a "dry" film "which elegantly knits the semiotics of cinema into an understated relationship drama about an academic ... who realizes that her partner ... is kind of a tool." (Cockburn's response to this characterization of the husband was: "Nailed it.") Jason Anderson is quoted as calling the film an "astounding feat of cerebral and cinephilic dexterity" at the Toronto festival. Courtney Small calls it "a smart, witty, and at times dizzying, exploration into language and cinema", and a "stirring look at how we interpret words and how easily we accept things not actually said." Andrew Parker calls the short a "witty blending of semantics and melodrama": "Not only a discussion about the use of metaphor in a literary and cinematic sense, Cockburn has also created a short that's dripping with visual metaphor in its own right, building to a sumptuous, layered film." In Sicinski's review, he suggests that calling it a "theory film" would risk relegating it to the "circular file", and then adds: "Nevertheless, the film is so fitfully alive that we could probably count on it to crawl back out under its own power."

Jamie Dunn calls the transition from what the film appears to be, "a smug essay film splicing together scenes from a myriad of familiar works" which makes "some very spurious arguments about the nature of metaphor in cinema", into "an indie drama", something "wonderful":

Just when you think your eyes can't roll any further back into your head something wonderful happens, and we start to follow the woman, a septuagenarian professor, who's made this essay film. Now taking the form of an indie drama, we're with the filmmaker on her daily routine... Written notes appear on screen as the filmmaker begins to refine her theories and question the accuracy of some of the points she has made... After seeing The Argument, we kind of wish all essay films had a similar second half, with the likes of Adam Curtis and Jean-Luc Godard forced to reassess their intellectual leaps.

One reviewer calls the film "offbeat and quirky" and a "thinking-person's flick" consisting of "rambling philosophy and wordplay", the area in which Cockburn "excels", since he brings self-awareness to the academic's self-indulgence: "It's amusing and thought provoking if one has the taste for it, otherwise, The Argument might feel like film class mumbo jumbo."

=== Accolades ===
- 42nd Toronto International Film Festival • Canada's Top Ten, 2018 (selected in 2017)

The film was also nominated for the Short Cuts Award for Best Canadian Short Film, but lost to Pre-Drink.
