= The Impostor (hello goodbye) =

2003 experimental short film

- Directed by: Daniel Cockburn
- Written by: Daniel Cockburn
- Starring: Daniel Cockburn
- Edited by: Daniel Cockburn
- Music by: Alexander Glenfield
- Production company: ZeroFunction Productions
- Distributed by: Vtape
- Release date: 9 October 2003 (Tranz Tech)
- Running time: 9 minutes
- Country: Canada
- Language: English

The Impostor (hello goodbye) is a 2003 Canadian short experimental film by video artist Daniel Cockburn, one of several works commissioned for The Colin Campbell Sessions and inspired by the makings of video art pioneer Colin Campbell for the Tranz Tech festival. Cockburn's video draws formally on Campbell's style while at the same time metaphorically expresses the artist's anxiety in making the video itself.

== Plot ==
I watched my words transmogrify into miniature razor blades, syllable-encrusted sewing needles, and minuscule and many-pointed shards of crystal. I watched all of these unhealthy words – these unhealthy physical words – pass from my mouth into my father's body, and still I couldn't stop talking. — Still frame and quote from the short (Note: Text quoted by Mike Hoolboom, who discusses the significance of the word "physical" being italicized in Cockburn's script. The words are "physical" because they have been "laid onto videotape"; Cockburn belongs to a generation of video artists who made videos rather than digital files, and "it's clear that the material troubles him, why else imagine the turning wheels of the video cassette skinning him alive? What is the cost of creating an object out of this voice, of putting my voice onto this piece of tape?")

In a split screen, a man dressed in a black suit and tie (Daniel Cockburn) speaks directly to the audience, while a black and white home movie is being projected next to him, on the left. He describes a dream in which he was asked to read a eulogy for his father. As he does so, the projectionist on the left hand side (Daniel Cockburn) is cutting the film with scissors.

Watching his father (Daniel Cockburn) in the home movie, he realizes that the gestures his father made are a kind of prison; he is forced to repeat them involuntarily. Then the man in black looks on with the horror of recognition, realizing that his father's body language "prefigured all the gestures into which I would later grow, thinking they were my own."

In a dream, the man returns to his father's bedside. "I had gone to visit him at the hospital, and he had been unconscious, but I thought he might like to hear the sound of my voice, so I spoke to him..." The man's father is on his deathbed. Moments before his father dies, the man speaks to him, but his father makes no sign of hearing. The man pulls out an IV tube and speaks into it as though it were a microphone. His words turn into sharp needles that enter his father through the tube, who dies presently. The man wonders if his words killed his father, or perhaps removing the tube.

At his father's funeral, the man says that his inheritance now depends on the tears shed by the audience.

The man changes places with the projectionist in the left hand side of the screen. The projectionist destroys the work.

== Cast ==
Daniel Cockburn plays both a fictional version of himself and his "fictionally dead father".

The fictional Cockburn is himself conceived as split between the "monologist" who delivers the introspective eulogy, and "the projectionist who destroys the film after its projected." At the end, Cockburn the monologist steps back to take the place of Cockburn the projectionist, and Cockburn the projectionist steps forward to take the place of Cockburn the monologist.

== Themes ==
=== Life and death ===
On the surface, The Impostor (hello goodbye) is ostensibly a work about a dead father and a eulogy by his son. Norman Wilner finds Cockburn talks about life and death, and dreams of death, "with a childlike fascination and an adult's sense of gravity."

=== The artist and the anxiety of performance ===
Most of Cockburn's previous work had been, in one way or another, about himself, his own ideas: "It's me trying to figure myself out." When he was asked to make a video for The Colin Campbell Sessions to be screened with other new films inspired by Colin Campbell, it gave him pause:

I didn't know how I was going to be able to do a film about myself and still be respectful. I felt guilty about using Colin's life to do stuff about myself. I felt like I was standing on the shoulders of giants. That's where the idea of the impostor came from.

The Impostor is therefore "a portrait of a young man using the death of another as an opportunity to grandstand", that is to say: "It's a video about Cockburn's anxiety about making the video."

=== Fathers and sons: the anxiety of influence ===
Cockburn transforms this anxiety of performance into one of influence, through the theme of fathers and sons, which Mike Hoolboom traces across a number of Cockburn's videos, including WEAKEND, which premiered at the same festival as The Impostor, in which video the theme is "brought to a head". To comply with the commission, Cockburn must take inspiration from an influential predecessor or "video dad", Colin Campbell. The man speaking in the video, according to Cockburn, has an "adverse relationship to his late father (who is also himself) – an antagonism born of disassociation, of one party's ignorance and the other's absence." He is attempting to breach that chasm by throwing a rope across it, "even as a third aspect of himself scissors the rope into little bits."

Colin is an influence at second remove; I understand his work by having heard people talk about it, by having seen work made in its shadow. So my work is the shadow of a shadow, a second-generation copy at best. For me, in the context of video art, Colin is like, for instance, Orson Welles (and I mean the Welles of Chimes at Midnight and It's All True!, not the Welles who made Citizen Kane and Touch of Evil and the other few that I actually have seen)... And if we stand on the shoulders of those who come before us, then I'm standing on someone who's standing on Colin's shoulders, and I've gotten to this height to no credit of my own... And I want to build on what I'm standing on, not just fritter away my vantage point from atop the dead, yet it feels that to do so I have to wrest attention away from them, toward myself (because attention is a finite resource)... At any rate, I feel a need to justify or defend myself – even if only to myself, to make me happy.

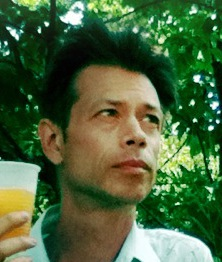
Mike Hoolboom

Colin Campbell made his first films in Sackville, where he made a "gently ironic send up" of his small town origins (he was born in Reston, Manitoba) and "big world aspirations," done in the form of a monologue delivered to camera, "all in one take, like so much work made in the seventies." Sackville, I'm Yours (1972) became a template for Campbell's work over the next three decades, and "set up a style sheet for much of the field." Cockburn's own performance addressed directly to the camera is a postmodernist take on the motif: "there is a picture playing beside him, which turns his speaking self into a picture as well." Hoolboom asks whether the invoked eulogy, or indeed the video itself, is a eulogy for Campbell, and interprets the invocation as an expression of "the wish for the father's death", a metaphor for "the unconscious of the medium itself, the unspoken darkness that lies at the heart of the collective project" of video art:

Isn't this a confession? Whenever I speak I am killing him. Or: the only way for me to speak is to kill my father. Every word I pronounce is sharp, that's how dad feels it, because it's either him or me. There's no way for the two of us to talk at the same time, it's figure versus ground, Arnold versus Daniel, father against son. (Note: Hoolboom speculates that the "bedside confession" is an echo of an earlier video by Cockburn's "other video dad," Steve Reinke.)

== Production ==
=== Background ===
In the mid 2000s, Cockburn was making several videos and short films any given year. In 2003, besides The Impostor, he made WEAKEND, Denominations and the first version of AUDIT.

=== Commission and financing ===
Lisa Steele, who co-founded distributor Vtape with Colin Campbell and others, commissioned the project; unusually, she approached only artists who did not know Campbell well: "She always has an eye for outreach, and it was from this missionary position that the work advanced." Cockburn was unaware of this when he made The Impostor.

As a commission for The Colin Campbell Sessions, the video was made with the assistance of the Canada Council for the Arts Media Arts Commissioning Grant.

=== Filming and editing ===
The Impostor was shot in a single take of eighteen minutes; Cockburn then split the screen, putting the first nine minutes on the left side and the second nine on the right. Hoolboom was under the impression this was done with no edits. This is not quite true, as Cockburn pointed out:

There is one not-quite-hidden but not-usually-noticed dissolve which enables me to present an 18-minute take as a nine-minute (hopefully invisible) split-screen. (I feel uncomfortable saying this, as if I were Hitchcock letting the dead mother out of the bag just because it seemed a fitting thing to do in the middle of a chat with some decent fellow down at the press club.)

Tarkovsky said that electronic music at its ideal could 'be like someone breathing'.

— Daniel Cockburn interviewed by Mike Hoolboom

=== Music ===
Cockburn said that Alex Glenfield's music is the "emotional anchor of the movie". Glenfield composed and recorded it a couple of years before Cockburn's commission, and first played the CD for Cockburn while he was formulating the concept for his video. "I thought it would be appropriate for The Impostor, with its waxing/waning, loop-like structure, and when he told me the title and the sonic ingredients, I knew it was doubly perfect." Glenfield had been thinking about Morse code and its use as a means for soldiers to communicate with their allies during wartime, wondering if anyone might have formulated a message for an enemy, which Cockburn called "a proposal that sounds melancholy and humane"; a part of the piece of music represents the phrase for my enemy in Morse code, repeated and superposed at various pitches. (Note: "There is also... a second Morse code phrase in the piece, but no one has yet been able to decipher it, and he refuses to tell.") This seemed fitting to Cockburn, referring to the "giants" on whose shoulders he "stands": "I don't know if they are my enemy – I doubt it, in fact, for they have given me so much – but quite often I feel I am theirs (or maybe rival is a more accurate, less stinging though also less evocative term than enemy)."

== Release and reception ==
The Impostor (hello goodbye) premiered two days before WEAKEND at the festival where they were both commissioned, Tranz Tech, the third biennial media art festival, on 9 October 2003.

=== Anthology film ===
Beginning in 2009, The Impostor began to be shown along with a selection of Cockburn's other films, under the collective title You Are In a Maze of Twisty Little Passages, All Different, the actual programme varying with the venue.

=== Home media ===
A 55-minute DVD (for exhibitions and educational institutions) of one version of the anthology film was released in 2009.

Daniel Cockburn eerily inhabits the delicate tissues of verbal ambiguity... Never has the alternate ending so well eaten its tail as truth cycles in and out of focus, complicated by the multiple voices of the complex yet hapless protagonist.

— Lisa Steele, Tranz Tech 2003 catalogue

=== Critical response ===
Norman Wilner describes Cockburn's work as "strange and recursive and curious and enthralling, and sometimes all at once." Alissa Firth-Eagland describes Cockburn's videos as "cleverly self-referential without being didactic"; she finds his performances intriguing:

I find there are many blind spots for me in all his onscreen characterizations. A notable mutability of portrayer and portrayed is evident in particular in his work The Impostor (hello goodbye): there's a mysterious blurring of fact and fiction. I am always left wondering how much of his onscreen personalities are, in fact, him.

Mike Hoolboom, in an email interview with Cockburn, finds something similar: "You deliver this monologue in a manner Colin would have relished, brimful with irony... I am fixated, as usual, on your performing presence... your movie offers the... vicarious pleasures of the meta-verse: not emotions, but emotions that are about emotions."
