= Metronome (film) =

2002 experimental short film

- Directed by: Daniel Cockburn
- Written by: Daniel Cockburn
- Produced by: Daniel Cockburn
- Starring: Daniel Cockburn
- Cinematography: Chris MacLean; (additional camera): Hilda Rasula; Daniel Cockburn
- Edited by: Hilda Rasula
- Production company: ZeroFunction Productions
- Distributed by: Vtape
- Release date: 26 October 2002 (Moving Pictures Festival)
- Running time: 11 minutes
- Country: Canada
- Language: English

Metronome is a 2002 Canadian short experimental film which mixes appropriated film clips and video by video artist Daniel Cockburn to express ideas about rhythm and order, the self and other minds, and the digital age. Densely philosophical, the work is acknowledged as his international "breakout hit" after several locally successful short works, winning praise from critics, a mention, and an award.

Still frame and Wittgenstein quotes from Metronome How small a thought it takes to fill a whole life!: Ludwig Wittgenstein, Culture and Value; Language sets everyone the same traps; it is an immense network of wrong turnings… What I have to do then is erect signposts at all the junctions where there are wrong turnings so as to help people past the danger points.: Ludwig Wittgenstein, Culture and Value

== Synopsis ==
A quote by Ludwig Wittgenstein appears onscreen accompanied by choral voices. (Note: Orchestrated by Steve Reich in his piece Proverb.)

It is morning. In a kitchen, an artist (Daniel Cockburn) sits at a table, still in pyjamas, pounding a regular beat on the table with his hand (144 beats per minute). (Note: The beat is expressed as "Pass the god-damn butter.") The artist states in voice-over: "This will be my rhythm for the day", and he begins to beat his chest rather than the table. The artist is seen doing routine morning things while the beat and pounding continue. He goes outside and gets on a bus.

The artist goes to a movie and later plays pool. All the while, his voice-over continues to speak rapidly, discussing mental patterns in life, language, rhythm, as well as determinacy and free will. He talks about Hollywood films that have inspired him, and appropriated clips begin to play one after the other along with the artist's own footage. He wonders how many of his daily thoughts are his own, as opposed to ideas coming from films or indeed the rest of his life experience.

The artist returns home. He lies down and stops beating his chest, however the pounding continues. In voice-over, he says "Jesus, how much longer is this going to go on?" Another quote by Wittgenstein appears onscreen. A bell rings, and a bus sign appears flashing STOP REQUESTED.

The end credits roll, accompanied by a cut-up remix of the music that played at the start.

== Cast ==
Daniel Cockburn • The Artist

== Genre and influences ==
I had just seen Fight Club, for the second time... I thought of how this voiceover would sound, and it doesn't feel like it was really my idea. I had the rhythm and the timbre of Ed Norton's monologues swirling around whichever mental whirlpool I was stuck in that day on the Bathurst bus.

— Metronome

A "densely philosophical film", Metronome is also darkly comic.

Among many other films, Cockburn's work refers directly to the voice-over monologue from the film Fight Club, the Artist speaking in a flat monotone staccato similar to the narrating character portrayed by Edward Norton. Another "end-of-century, white-collar rebellion chic film" that appears in Metronome is The Matrix.

== Themes and interpretations ==
=== Rhythm and order ===
In many of his short works, Cockburn is especially interested in the rhythm of speech and singing. Metronome is ostensibly a video essay on rhythm and order, more specifically a meditation on the rhythm of the human body and its mathematics. Cockburn "sets out to prove that it's easier than you might think to keep the same beat all day." That, at least, is Metronome's "conceptual starting point", the narrator's attempt to keep a steady beat for an extended period of time: "It's a "day in the life" movie, from breakfast to bedtime, with me pounding my own chest at 144 beats per minute in sync with a constant table-drumming on the soundtrack." By the end of the film, it appears that the self-imposed repetition has become hellishly unbearable. Metronome is a "piece that you can almost dance to - almost." One interpretation of this aspect of the film is that the Artist's fixation does not come from within himself; that Metronome is a critique of modern life.

=== The self and other minds ===
Like much of Cockburn's early work, the film arises from his own thoughts and self-analysis: "That's what my work's about. It's me trying to figure myself out." Astria Suparak describes the self-portrayal as that of an underdog "with a feeble narcissism".

At the same time, the film is also socially themed. Three years following the production of Metronome, in an interview with Mike Hoolboom, Cockburn said it was "all about a mind formed by the images of others."

A[n]... insistent voiceover makes a fairly deterministic and despairing relation between meter/order/loops and the experience of repetitive thought patterns. ... The monologue acknowledges its debt to other monologue-based movies I've seen (repeatedly, in many cases), and goes on from there to speculate on how two decades of movie going has insinuated certain aesthetic and ideological beats into the polyrhythm that is my psyche.

=== Anxiety in the digital age ===
Adam Nayman has remarked that many of Cockburn's short pieces express a form of technophobia. Cockburn states in the interview with Hoolboom that he is particularly perturbed by digital video: "Digital video scares the crap out of me, more so than film by a long shot." A little later, he says: "Metronome alludes to the physical experience of life in a digital age; the/my body is presented as a thing stuck living out the mental loops of its controlling brain."

If my life's argument has a conclusion (by which I mean closing credits), I hope they're not my life flashing before my eyes. I mean, Woody Allen has already done that — and, for that matter, so has Robert Altman. And everybody knows they got it from Bergman.

— Metronome

=== Life and death ===
In a brief retrospective review, Norman Wilner notes that Cockburn has a singular way of talking about life and death: "In works like Metronome and The Impostor (hello goodbye), he considers life, death and dreams - and dreams about death - with a childlike fascination and an adult's sense of gravity."

== Production ==
=== Background ===
By 2002, Daniel Cockburn had become established in Toronto as a maker of "engrossing, cerebral short video pieces". Cockburn released the following short works the same year: i hate video (a related work), IdeaL, You Are in a Maze of Twisty Little Passages, all Different, PSYCHO / 28 X 2, and Subteranea Gargantua (prelude). Like Metronome, many of these were commissions.

Cockburn came to video after first working with Super 8, 16mm and linear video editing, and, as noted above, was uncomfortable with digital video as a medium on philosophical grounds:

Whatever you say about it, a film frame is an object which bears the physical imprint of reality. A videotape is an object which bears an analogically encoded imprint of reality. This is still somehow acceptable to me — but once you get into digital video, and the tape-object is merely a carrier for various file formats, for language that humans will never be able to comprehend (though they may have invented it), it seems somehow heretical that we should think that the image and sound which spew out the other end of this tape/computer actually embody a connection to reality. Bearing a resemblance and embodying a connection are two different things.

=== Filming ===
The portions of Metronome made by Cockburn were shot in Toronto, such as the bus ride along Bathurst Street, referred to by name in the voice-over. Cockburn described how he conceived of making a video combining appropriated footage with his own. In Metronome, the appropriated footage is like a POV shot, while the video of himself is a reaction shot. "My voiceover, in connecting the two, fulfills the function that would in classical cinema be fulfilled by my eyeline. This might in fact be more subjective, since it's a shot-reverse-shot alternation motivated by the mind's eye rather than the retina's". Metronome was produced on video and completed in conjunction with a grant under the Charles Street Video "Home Show" Residency Program.

=== Post-production ===
Ryan Feldman was responsible for post-production, which took place at Charles Street Video, using After Effects.

== Release ==
Metronome premiered at the 11th annual Moving Pictures Festival of Dance on Film and Video, in the Canada Dances section, Saturday 26 October 2002. It was shown at Canada House in London before the year was over. A year later, it was described as his "most successful" film to date, "spending 2003 touring festivals in the U.S. and Europe."

In 2004, Wendy Banks said the film was a "festival favourite". In 2005, Mike Hoolboom acknowledged it as Cockburn's "breakout hit", comparing the response it received it to James Benning's American Dreams (1984): "something of that shadow hung over Metronome, it was just so smart and hurting and funny." A screening at the Rivoli Theatre, Toronto, in 2006 was preceded by a discussion by theoretical physicist Lee Smolin, who contributed to a catalogue for a curated programme of Cockburn's films (see below).

=== Anthology film ===
Beginning in 2009, Metronome began to be shown along with a selection of Cockburn's other films, under the collective title You Are In a Maze of Twisty Little Passages, All Different, the actual programme varying with the venue.

=== Home media ===
A 55-minute DVD (for exhibitions and educational institutions) of one version of the anthology film was released in 2009.

== Reception ==
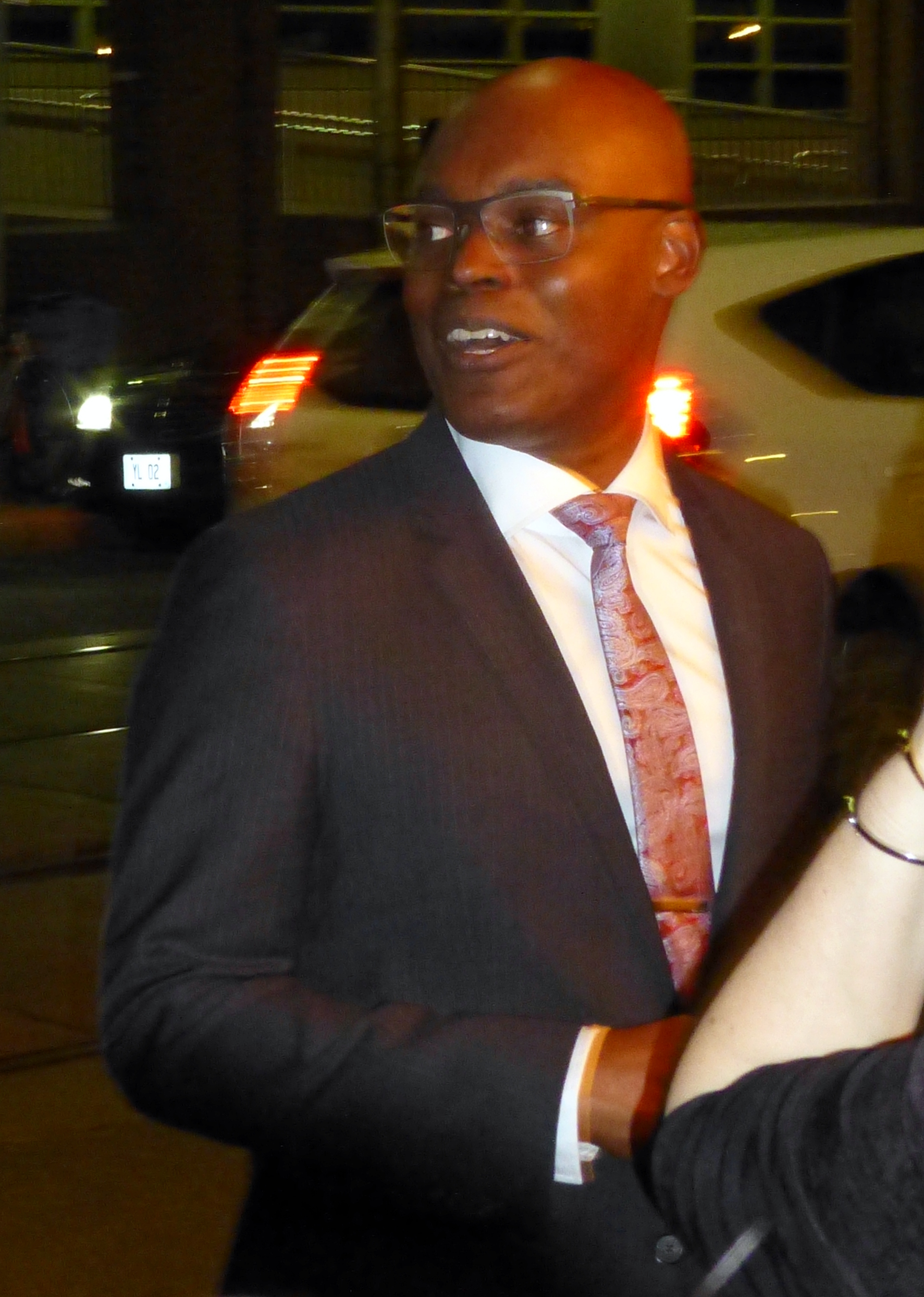
TIFF's Cameron Bailey

=== Critical response ===
Declaring Cockburn was "Toronto's best new video artist", Cameron Bailey stated that Metronome was "shockingly inspired," mixing Wittgenstein, movies and pattern theory. Wendy Banks called the film "dizzying" and "worth the price of admission" to see it, "plus the cab ride". Glenn Sumi said it took absurdity to an extreme but his talent and idiosyncratic form of postmodernism was appealing:

Filmmaker Daniel Cockburn obsessively pounds his chest and speaks in an intentional monotone, trying to locate the rhythmic beat of his life. We never get to the bottom of the narrator's fixation on rhythm — in film and his daily life — but Cockburn's a talented director with a sharp technique and a clever pomo sensibility that's always engaging.

James Missen of the Available Light Screening Collective in Ottawa said that in Metronome, Cockburn merges the aesthetics of his Toronto predecessors Mike Hoolboom and Steve Reinke "in order to weave a compelling tale of domestic routinization that is equal parts hilarious and heartening." Hoolboom himself was impressed enough by the film that it is ranked in 18th place on his 2017 list of Top 111 Canadian films. Hoolboom wrote in 2005:

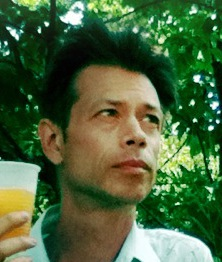
Mike Hoolboom

He burst into my brain with Metronome, a movie that remixed an artist's diary and found footage smarts in a meditation on the body's mathematics... Superimposed on his heartbeat, which here is a stand-in for the inner monologue, are pictures which arrive from elsewhere, secondary experiences which storm the screen with an abyss of another kind: the promise of pleasure without consequence. It's only a movie, right? But this cinephile, who is busy turning himself into an image, tries to weigh the cost of his mediascape... Deploying an elegant clip collage he demonstrates that films are models of ordering, impossible to imagine without it... but at the same time he notes this ordering leads to despair. A perfect world, in which everything can be known, is perilously close to fascism's "politics equals aesthetics," but without striving to know, where is happiness? "All this too is seductive, aesthetic, perfect despair."

=== Accolades ===
Award

- Media City 9 Film Festival, 2003 • Jury Award - Best Canadian Film/Video/Installation

Honorable mention

- Images Festival, 2002 • Homebrew Award - Best Local Emerging Artist (together with The Other Shoe)

== Related work ==
i hate video (2002)

Also released in 2002, i hate video is an eight-minute "documentary of sorts" on the making of Metronome.
