= List of Canadian films of 2001 =

This is a list of Canadian films which were released in 2001:

Title	Director	Cast	Genre	Notes
4125 Parthenais (Le 4125, rue Parthenais)	Isabelle Lavigne		Documentary	
Almost America	Antonio Frazzi, Andrea Frazzi	Sabrina Ferilli, Massimo Ghini, Henry Czerny, Tony Nardi, Dominic Zamprogna	Romantic comedy	Canadian-Italian coproduction
Aria	Pjotr Sapegin		Animated short	Canadian-Norwegian coproduction
The Art of Woo	Helen Lee	Sook-Yin Lee, Adam Beach	Romantic comedy	
Avalanche Alley	Paul Ziller	Ed Marinaro, Nick Mancuso	Adventure, Drama	Made for TV
Atanarjuat: The Fast Runner	Zacharias Kunuk	Natar Ungalaaq, Sylvia Ivalu, Peter-Henry Arnatsiaq, Pakak Innukshuk, Madeline Ivalu	Epic drama set 4,000 years ago in the Canadian Arctic	First Inuit-produced feature film
Black Soul (Âme noire)	Martine Chartrand		Animated short	
Blue Potatoes (Le Minot d'or)	Isabelle Raynauld		Documentary	
Century Hotel	David Weaver	Lindy Booth, Colm Feore, David Hewlett, Sandrine Holt, Janet Kidder	Drama, Mystery, Romance	
Danny in the Sky	Denis Langlois	Thierry Pépin, Eric Cabana, Véronique Jenkins	Drama	
Dead Awake	Marc S. Grenier	Stephen Baldwin, Michael Ironside	Dark comedy thriller television film	U.S. coproduction
Druids	Jacques Dorfmann	Christopher Lambert, Klaus Maria Brandauer	Historical, Adventure	Canada-France-Belgium co-production
February 15, 1839 (15 février 1839)	Pierre Falardeau	Luc Picard, Sylvie Drapeau, Frédéric Gilles, Julien Poulin	Historical biodrama	About the final days of François-Marie-Thomas Chevalier de Lorimier
The Fiancée of Life (La fiancée de la vie)	Carole Laganière		Documentary	
FILM(dzama)	Deco Dawson	Maurice Dzama	Experimental short	
Formula 51	Ronny Yu	Samuel L. Jackson, Robert Carlyle, Emily Mortimer, Rhys Ifans, Meat Loaf	Action	Canada-U.K. co-production
Games of the Heart (Du pic au cœur)	Céline Baril		Drama	
A Girl at the Window (Une jeune fille à la fenêtre)	Francis Leclerc	Fanny Mallette, Hugues Frenette, Denis Bernard, Johanne-Marie Tremblay	Drama	
Hey, Happy!	Noam Gonick	Jérémie Yuen	Comedy, drama	
The Hidden Fortress (La Forteresse suspendue)	Roger Cantin	Charlie Arcouette-Martineau, George Brossard, Gaston Caron, Isabelle Cyr, Xavier Dolan	Children's adventure comedy	
High Adventure	Mark Roper	Thomas Ian Griffith, Anja Kling	Adventure	Canadian-British-Italian-Bulgarian co-production
The Sea Wolf	Mark Roper	Thomas Ian Griffith, Gerit Kling	Adventure	Canadian-British-Italian-Cuban co-production
Honour Before Glory	Anthony Sherwood		Docudrama	
I Shout Love	Sarah Polley	Matthew Ferguson, Kristen Thomson	Short	Genie Award - Live-Action Short
Ice Cream, Chocolate and Other Consolations (Crème glacée, chocolat et autres consolations)	Julie Hivon	Dorothée Berryman, France Castel	Comedy-drama	
Inertia	Sean Garrity	Jonas Chernick, Sarah Constible, Gordon Tanner, Micheline Marchildon	Drama	
Jesus Christ Vampire Hunter	Lee Demarbre	Phil Caracas	Action comedy, Horror	Santa Cruz-Best Sci-Fi
Karmen Geï	Joseph Gaï Ramaka	Djeïnaba Diop Gaï, Stephanie Biddle, Magaye Adama Niang	Musical	Adaptation of the opera Carmen, Canadian-French-Senegalese coproduction
Karmina 2	Gabriel Pelletier	Gildor Roy, Yves Pelletier, Isabelle Cyr	Comedy horror	
Kevin of the North	Robert Spiers	Skeet Ulrich, Natasha Henstridge, Leslie Nielsen, Rik Mayall	Comedy	Canada-U.K. co-production
Khaled	Asghar Massombagi	Michael D'Ascenzo, Michelle Duquet, John Ralston, Joanne Boland	Drama	
Last Wedding	Bruce Sweeney	Benjamin Ratner Frida Betrani, Tom Scholte, Nancy Sivak, Vincent Gale, Molly Parker	Comedy film	Genie Awards – Supporting Actor (Gale), Supporting Actress (Parker); TFCA – Best Canadian Film
Lost and Delirious	Léa Pool	Jessica Paré, Piper Perabo, Mischa Barton, Jackie Burroughs	Drama	
Lunch with Charles	Michael Parker	Sean Lau, Theresa Lee, Nicholas Lea, Bif Naked, Tom Scholte	Comedy-drama	
Marriages (Mariages)	Catherine Martin		Drama	
Mile Zero	Andrew Currie	Michael Riley, Connor Widdows, Sabrina Grdevich	Family drama, thriller	
monopedal Joy	Daniel Cockburn	Daniel Cockburn	Short experimental film	Made from outtakes (The Other Shoe)
My Eye for a Camera (Mon oeil pour une caméra)	Denys Desjardins		Documentary	
MVP 2: Most Vertical Primate	Robert Vince	Scott Goodman, Richard Karn, Cameron Bancroft, Robert Costanzo, Oliver Muirhead	Family film	Made with U.S. financing
My Dinner with Weegee	Donigan Cumming	Marty Corbin	Documentary	
Obāchan's Garden	Linda Ohama		Documentary	
On the Nose	David Caffrey	Robbie Coltrane, Dan Aykroyd, Brenda Blethyn	Comedy	Canada-Ireland co-production
On Your Head (Le Ciel sur la tête)	André Melançon, Geneviève Lefebvre	Arianne Maheu, Serge Dupire, Céline Bonnier, Marc Messier, Maka Kotto	Comedy-drama	
The Other Shoe	Daniel Cockburn	Daniel Cockburn	Short experimental film	Honorable mention for Homebrew award shared with Metronome
Parsley Days	Andrea Dorfman	Megan Dunlop	Drama	
Picture Claire	Bruce McDonald	Juliette Lewis, Gina Gershon, Mickey Rourke	Thriller	
The Pig's Law (La Loi du cochon)	Érik Canuel	Isabel Richer, Sylvain Marcel, Catherine Trudeau	Drama	
The Pornographer (Le Pornographe)	Bertrand Bonello	Jean-Pierre Leaud, Jérémie Rénier, Dominique Blanc, André Marcon	Drama	Canada-France co-production; Cannes Film Festival - International Critics Prize
Rare Birds	Sturla Gunnarsson	William Hurt, Molly Parker, Andy Jones, Vicky Hynes	Comedy, drama	
Remembrance	Stephanie Morgenstern	Stephanie Morgenstern	Romance, drama	Prix Jutra – Short; Yorkton Film Festival – Jury Award
Replay (La Répétition)	Catherine Corsini	Emmanuelle Béart, Pascale Bussières, Dani Lévy, Jean-Pierre Kalfon, Sami Bouajila	Sexual drama	Canada-France co-production
See Spot Run	John Whitesell	David Arquette, Angus T. Jones, Paul Sorvino	Comedy	Made with U.S. financing
Shrek	Andrew Adamson, Vicky Jenson	Mike Myers, Eddie Murphy, Cameron Diaz, John Lithgow	Animated computer-animated fantasy comedy	Co-production with the US and Sweden
The Shipment	Alex Wright	Matthew Modine, Elizabeth Berkley	Crime drama	
Side Orders (Foie de canard et cœur de femme)	Stéphane Lapointe	Suzanne Clément, Christian Bégin	Short drama	
Soft Shell Man (Un Crabe dans la tête)	André Turpin	David La Haye, Isabelle Blais, Vincent Bilodeau	Drama	
Suddenly Naked	Anne Wheeler	Wendy Crewson, Peter Coyote, Emmanuelle Vaugier	Drama	Genie Award – Editing
Tar Angel (L'Ange de goudron)	Denis Chouinard	Zinedine Soualem, Hiam Abbass, Catherine Trudeau, Rabah Aït Ouyahia	Drama	
Three Princesses for Roland (Trois princesses pour Roland)	André-Line Beauparlant		Documentary	
Trains of Winnipeg	Clive Holden		Experimental film	
Treed Murray	William Phillips	David Hewlett, Clé Bennett	Drama	
Turning Paige	Robert Cuffley	Katharine Isabelle, Nicholas Campbell	Coming of age drama	
Varian's War	Lionel Chetwynd	William Hurt, Julia Ormond, Lynn Redgrave, Matt Craven, Alan Arkin, Rémy Girard	Docudrama	A France Canada-U.K. co-production by HBO Films
The War Bride	Lyndon Chubbuck	Anna Friel, Brenda Fricker, Molly Parker, Aden Young	Drama	Genie Awards – Art Direction, Costumes; Canada-U.K. co-production
Wedding Night (Nuit de noces)	Émile Gaudreault	François Morency, Geneviève Brouillette, Pierrette Robitaille, Sonia Vachon, Yves Jacques	Comedy, drama	Golden Reel Award
Westray	Paul Cowan		Documentary	Genie Award for Best Documentary
Wolf Girl	Thom Fitzgerald	Grace Jones, Tim Curry, Victoria Sanchez, Lesley Ann Warren	Horror	TV movie
The Woman Who Drinks (La Femme qui boit)	Bernard Émond	Élise Guilbault, Luc Picard, Michel Forget	Drama	Genie Award – Actress (Guilbault); Prix Jutra – Actress (Guilbault)

== See also ==
- 2001 in Canada
- 2001 in Canadian television
