= WEAKEND =

2003 experimental short film

- Directed by: Daniel Cockburn
- Written by: Daniel Cockburn
- Produced by: Daniel Cockburn
- Edited by: Daniel Cockburn
- Production company: ZeroFunction Productions
- Distributed by: Vtape
- Release date: 11 October 2003 (Tranz Tech)
- Running time: 7 minutes
- Country: Canada
- Language: English

WEAKEND (usually represented in all caps, but sometimes referred to as Weakend) is a 2003 Canadian short experimental film created by video artist Daniel Cockburn, made through a remix of audio and video from The 6th Day, a Hollywood feature film about cloning starring Arnold Schwarzenegger. Commissioned by famefame for the third biennial Tranz Tech Media Art Festival, the work was awarded the Jury prize.

[Schwarzenegger]: What are you doing to me? I don't think this is very funny. Who are you? You think you are a media artist because you control me with a piece of software. This is terrible. This is not natural. This is creepy. You know that. I want my life back. You think you are God because you control me. No, I don't think you are God. I don't think you are a media artist. You are a sick bastard. You can go fuck yourself. I'm going to take my life back. [Videomaker]: Love me two times Frankenstein and I'll enjoy you from both ends, making and unmaking you. I prefer your image anyways, the one that's on my hard drive, cooking all night with new changes. Wait until you see the new you. Though looking forward is something only I can do. You are condemned to looking back. — WEAKEND still frame and dialogue (Note: Text quoted by Mike Hoolboom.)

== Synopsis ==
Video and audio of Arnold Schwarzenegger as Adam Gibson from The 6th Day is loosened up and reworked by a videomaker, subjecting him to "a cruel series of digital replications".

It opens with "dreamed double encounters," followed by "the looped abyss of eyes within eyes, a mosaic of multiplying greetings" ("I'm Adam Gibson"), a looped descent, a montage of Schwarzenegger's reaction shots (slowed), and a pulsing screen atop a screen in which "even the frames are replicating".

The manipulation stops with the arrival of the Sabbath, when "the videomaker rests," and the Schwarzenegger of his creation appears to be perimitted to speak angrily for himself, (Note: Achieved by Cockburn splicing together his 6th Day dialogue to create the spoken text: the words are "respliced into a different order, sometimes syllable by syllable.") demanding that he be left alone. The videomaker replies, calling his creation a "Frankenstein", and exults in his own powers to digitally re-create him yet again.

== Themes and analysis ==
Like some of creator Daniel Cockburn's earlier shorts, WEAKEND was a commission, the single criterion of which in this case was that all media derive from Roger Spottiswoode's The 6th Day (2000).

=== The figure in the frame: the camera or the mirror ===
In 2005, Mike Hoolboom considered the moment of confrontation from the perspective of the fictional creation, which he contended may represent the modern everyman under "the pressure of too many cameras, the relentless surveillance of the supremely visible, the inflated surrogate, multiplied and sprayed across screens around the world", or, ourselves "inside a matrix of branded zones, which we announce with the clothes we put on as images, the picture foods we eat, the sitcoms we are busy living", and asks: "What happens when a mirror looks at itself?":

Here at last, in this weakened state, philosopher Schwarzenegger is allowed to muse on his too many years spent replicating, offering us warning and prophecy about our own hopes, even as he runs out of his own. He is spoken by the artist, like we are spoken by language, though here in the gridlocked codes of narrative we can see the tensions of power at work as an image is made to appear ("as if" – behind every image is the promise of "as if") as if it hoped only to escape its own finitude, its limits, sensing that something else might lie outside the frame.

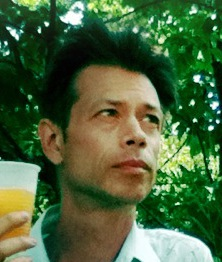
Mike Hoolboom

Hoolboom concluded that "longing and limits" were the heart of the work.

=== The artist and the God complex ===
Hoolboom and others also recognize that Cockburn explicitly replays this remix of The 6th Day "as an ingenious creation myth", following "the inference of the source film's title" referring to the Biblical six days of creation. He imposes "a calendar structure", applying a creationist metaphor and thereby broadens it into a consideration of "the relationship of an artist to materials". As Hoolboom put it in 2013, "In order to be a media artist, one must be God, the father, the one who controls. Or else one is the son, the subject, the controlled." The artist's video clips and editing are "divinely employed", imposing his will "on his newest digital son", an action movie star:

Schwarzenegger's visibility and stardom means only that his exposure to the author's interventions are maximized. The bigger the star, the easier it is to tear a stripe off him, to demote him to the status of video art subject. Arnold is recast as the lead in a video art movie, where heroic rescues have been abandoned, and there is no escaping the digital manipulations of his new father.

=== Anxiety in the digital age ===
Many of Cockburn's short pieces express a form of technophobia, and he states in an interview with Mike Hoolboom that he is particularly perturbed by digital video, and that phobia pervades several of his short works; in this case, it is the subject of the work who is consigned to "digital hell" rather than himself ("doing to Arnold what I usually do to myself"). He freely admitted that digital video "scares the crap out of me, more so than film by a long shot.

The Other Shoe was a not-very-veiled plea for the virtues of film over those of digitalia; Metronome alludes to the physical experience of life in a digital age... Governor Schwarzenegger is condemned to the seven circles of digital hell in WEAKEND...

== Production ==
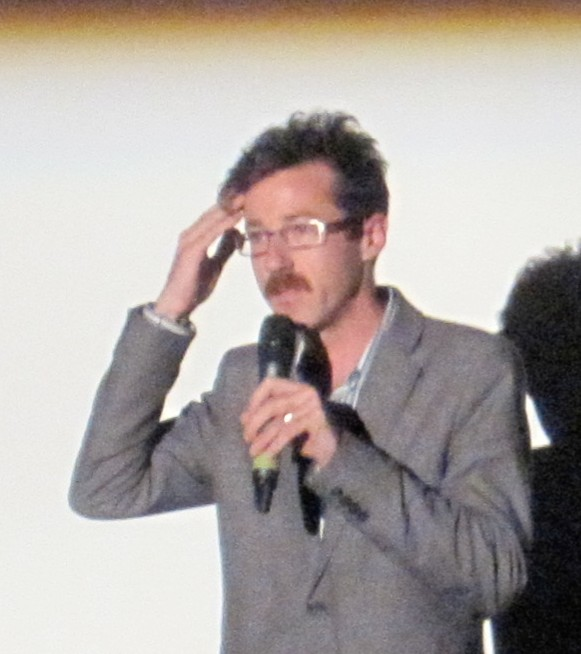
Daniel Cockburn

=== Background ===
In the mid 2000s, Cockburn was making several videos and short films any given year. In 2003, in addition to WEAKEND, he made The Impostor (hello goodbye), Denominations and the first version of AUDIT.

Cockburn came to video after first working with Super 8, 16mm and linear video editing, and, as noted above, was uncomfortable with digital video as a medium on philosophical grounds:

Whatever you say about it, a film frame is an object which bears the physical imprint of reality. A videotape is an object which bears an analogically encoded imprint of reality. This is still somehow acceptable to me — but once you get into digital video, and the tape-object is merely a carrier for various file formats, for language that humans will never be able to comprehend (though they may have invented it), it seems somehow heretical that we should think that the image and sound which spew out the other end of this tape/computer actually embody a connection to reality. Bearing a resemblance and embodying a connection are two different things.

=== Commission ===
WEAKEND was created for "Attack of the Clones" at the 2003 Tranz Tech Media Art Biennial. Around a dozen artists responded to an open call by media-art collective famefame to produce a video using only images and sound from The 6th Day, the idea being that just as the film is about cloning, so the artworks would all be "little clones" of the film, "each fighting to have its own voice in a sea of sameness." As Cockburn put it: "All videos in the program would have the same DNA, so to speak, all clones of the original 35mm opus."

=== Development and editing ===
WEAKEND was made by splicing together images and words from The 6th Day on video. Cockburn was "very excited about the project" at first, "until I finally watched the film and was so underwhelmed by its content and images that I felt sullenly noncommittal." Cockburn felt that the short was only a "series of digital gimmicks to perpetrate upon Arnold" which, while fun, were hardly "enough". "So I felt I needed to give them some context and use (and also expiate my moral twinges at playing with Arnold so cruelly, doing to Arnold what I usually do to myself) by giving Arnold the epilogue in which he criticizes the proceedings."

== Release ==
WEAKEND premiered two days after another of Cockburn's shorts, The Impostor (hello goodbye) at the festival where they were both commissioned, Tranz Tech, the third biennial media art festival, in the "Attack of the Clones" section, at Latvian House, on 11 October 2003.

=== Anthology film ===
Beginning in 2009, WEAKEND began to be shown along with a selection of Cockburn's other films, under the collective title You Are In a Maze of Twisty Little Passages, All Different, the actual programme varying with the venue.

=== Home media ===
A 55-minute DVD (for exhibitions and educational institutions) of one version of the anthology film You Are in a Maze of Twisty Little Passages, all Different was released in 2009.

== Reception ==
=== Critical response ===
Norman Wilner appreciates how Cockburn repurposes clips from The 6th Day into a "dissertation on artistic control and character manipulation," a "fascinating fractal treatment that engages fully with themes the source material barely understands." Mike Hoolboom similarly avers that none of the other entries for the "Attack of the Clones" were as "finely tuned" as Cockburn's, and the "cut and paste monologue" is "hilarious".

=== Accolade ===
- Tranz Tech Media Art Biennial • famefame Jury Prize
