= Jan Peacock =

- Born: 1955 (age 70–71); Barrie, Ontario, Canada
- Known for: Video artist
- Website: janpeacock.net

External videos
- “Sirensong” (1987) by Jan Peacock, Images Festival

Jan Peacock (born November 6, 1955, in Barrie, Ontario) is a Canadian interdisciplinary artist, curator and writer.

== Life ==
Peacock was born in Barrie, Ontario. She studied at the University of Western Ontario, receiving her BFA in 1978, and went on to the University of California, San Diego for her MFA in 1981. Peacock lives in Halifax, Nova Scotia, where she teaches at NSCAD University.

== Writing ==
Some of her published texts include:

- "Presence" in Point and Shoot: Performance et Photography,
- "Ready Access" in Public, No 25: Experimentalism (Toronto: Public Access, 2002),
- "Move This" and "4/14/99" (with Paula Levine) in LUX: A Decade of Artists’ Film and Video, ed. Steve Reinke and Tom Taylor (Toronto: YYZ Books, 1998)
- "(in)Script" and "SiRENSONG" in By the Skin of Their Tongues: Artists’ Video Scripts, ed. Nelson Henricks and Steve Reinke (Toronto: YYZ Books, 1996)
- Corpus Loquendi (Body for Speaking): Body-Centred Video in Halifax 1972- 1982 (Halifax: Dalhousie Art Gallery, 1994).

== Collections ==
Peacock's work is found in international public and private collections, including the National Gallery of Canada, the Museum of Modern Art in New York, and Museum Ludwig in Cologne.

== Awards ==
She has won awards at the Atlantic Film & Video Festival (Best Experimental, 1990) the Chicago International Film & Video Festival (1992), and the Atlanta Film & Video Festival (1997). She is a recipient of the Bell Canada Award and the Canada Council Medal for her contribution to the field of video. Peacock received a Governor General's Award in Visual and Media Arts in 2012.

== Selected works ==
- Sirensong, 9 min. (1987)
- Nuits Blanches: Dark Days, Sleepless Nights, Voice and Nothing More (1990)
- White Wash (1991)
- Reader By The Window (1993)
- Book of Chairs (1997)
- The Road Rises To Meet You
