= The Bad Idea Reunion =

2010 experimental short film

- Directed by: Daniel Cockburn
- Written by: Daniel Cockburn
- Produced by: Daniel Cockburn
- Starring: Minna Haller
- Cinematography: Daniel Cockburn; Barbara Goldstein
- Edited by: Daniel Cockburn
- Animation by: Jenn Norton
- Production company: ZeroFunction Productions
- Distributed by: Vtape
- Release date: September 2010 (TIFF)
- Running time: 4 minutes
- Country: Canada
- Language: English

The Bad Idea Reunion is a 2010 Canadian short experimental film by video artist Daniel Cockburn, in which an infant muses in an internal monologue on the future and the forms its good and bad ideas will take.

== Synopsis ==
"It's never too early to think about your future," muses an infant (Minna Haller) in voice-over (London Angelis) in the carseat of a car in motion on a rainy night. The baby contemplates the ideas to come with growing up, good and bad. "My good ideas will manifest as shapes... pure, clean, simple geometry." The shapes - a red pyramid, a blue sphere, and a green cube - float before and past the baby's eyes. "My bad ideas will manifest as people... with straight black hair, albino skin, and bright green eyes."

Someday, when grown up, the adult child will have a final bad idea, and all the "bad idea people" will gather together at the airport to board a plane, looking as though they are there for a family reunion since they all resemble one another. The image transitions from the infant in the carseat to one of a plane on a tarmac on a day with low visibility. Aboard the plane, thinks the infant, a very old man tells the rest of the passengers in a cracked voice: I am the original bad idea. I was here before any of you. I'm the idea to make all of you and put you on this plane. When asked where they are going to land, he tells them they are not going to land anywhere. "And if they look worried, he'll try to soothe them." The old man will say: Don't worry, it's never too late to think about your future.

On the tarmac, the plane begins to taxi in preparation for takeoff and fades into the distance.

== Cast ==
- Minna Haller • infant
- London Angelis (voice)

== Themes ==
The infant, neither named nor gendered, (Note: Played by a baby girl but voiced by a boy.) is "the most pessimistic pre-verbal baby ever." To the child, the ideal or good is identified with simple geometry, "pure" and "clean", while the "bad" is, as Daniel Benedict remarks, embodied by pale, bright-eyed, "creepy" or "scary" (unheimlich) people. When asked if this is how he sees the world, Daniel Cockburn said he habitually prefers the ideal to the complicated world of people, noting that no-one likes to admit feeling this way. Benedict and Cockburn briefly discuss the film's themes in relation to Cockburn's lecture-performance, All The Mistakes I've Made.

== Production ==
=== Commission ===
The Bad Idea Reunion was made for the TIFF Talent Lab. The commission was for films of one to five minutes.

=== Voice and music ===
London Angelis voices another anonymous child character in You Are Here, Cockburn's first feature film also released in 2010.

An electronic music beat running through the monologue serves as an overture for the song which plays as the plane fades into the fog ("My Favourite Mistakes", by Ford Pier).

== Release ==
The Bad Idea Reunion premiered at the 35th annual Toronto International Film Festival in September 2010.
