= God's Nightmares =

2019 experimental short film

- Title frame
- Directed by: Daniel Cockburn
- Written by: Daniel Cockburn
- Produced by: Daniel Cockburn
- Edited by: Daniel Cockburn
- Production company: ZeroFunction Productions
- Distributed by: Vtape
- Release date: 8 September 2019 (TIFF)
- Running time: 5 minutes
- Countries: Canada; United Kingdom
- Language: English
- Budget: C$300,000

God's Nightmares is a 2019 Canadian-British short experimental black comedy film created by Daniel Cockburn that "mashes together" appropriated film clips, creating a visual collage that imagines the thoughts that plague God at night, his "interior monologue," in which he muses about a recurring nightmare of being an everyman.

== Synopsis ==
Dozens of disjointed images flow one after the other: the mind of God reviewing human activities, anxiously considering the nightmare possibility of becoming trapped in his own creation as an everyman.

== Themes ==
Ostensibly, Daniel Cockburn explores the "murky world of dream logic", "the stuff of dreams and nightmares", by means of a meditative collage of "iconic and esoteric movie clips ... artfully set to the measured but troubled reflections" of God. However, as Calum Marsh notes, the film technique is also a way "to think about how movies work", and in that sense God's Nightmares may be seen as a follow-up to the director's 2017 film, The Argument (with annotations).

== Production ==
=== Background ===
In 2017, the same year he completed his York University master's thesis film, The Argument (with annotations), Cockburn began an artist-in-residency and a research fellowship at the Queen Mary University of London's School of Languages, Linguistics and Film in its pilot year. Both The Argument and God's Nightmares are considered Canadian-British co-productions.

=== Financing ===
In the introduction to his review of God's Nightmares, Marsh notes appreciatively that Telefilm Canada and other funding bodies in recent years "have completely redefined how money is awarded to filmmakers across the country", choosing to support dozens of different projects "instead of bankrolling two- or three-million-dollar epics by washed-up directors who have been phoning it in since middle age", representing "a shake-up that is already transforming the landscape of Canadian film in a fundamental way." It has been reported that Cockburn's project had a budget of $300,000.

=== Editing ===
Cockburn's film relies almost exclusively on "a few dozen carefully curated film clips," the same collage technique he made use of in the first half of The Argument and in his early short film work.

== Release and reception ==
God's Nightmares had its world premiere at the 44th Toronto International Film Festival on 8 September 2019 in the Short Cuts Programme, and its U.S. premiere shortly thereafter at Fantastic Fest on 22 September 2019.

=== Critical response ===
Writing for Now following the film's premiere at Toronto, Norman Wilner placed it at the top of his list of best ten short films at the festival, Wilner calls the film a video essay. God's Nightmares likewise makes it on to Calum Marsh's list of top six short films at the festival, and he also calls Cockburn "one of Canada's preeminent film essayists" whose "odd, often beguiling experiments with sound and image display an extraordinarily rich familiarity with cinema history and, more than anything else, a profound love of motion pictures."

God's Nightmares, his latest short, follows up on the sly metacommentary of 2017's The Argument (With Annotations), again using found footage from a huge range of movies, and over the course of its brief running time, Cockburn draws surprising connections, finds intriguing parallels, and makes observations that qualify as bona fide film criticism, all tied together with a meditative narration that playfully muses about the thoughts and fixations of the Almighty.

Victor Stiff compares God's Nightmares to the "unsettling" films of David Lynch, saying the clips such as Halloween and After Hours induce anxiety through the "strange visual collage".
