= Denominations (film) =

2003 experimental short film

- Directed by: Daniel Cockburn
- Written by: Daniel Cockburn
- Produced by: Daniel Cockburn
- Starring: Joe Gibbons
- Cinematography: Daniel Cockburn
- Edited by: Daniel Cockburn
- Production company: ZeroFunction Productions
- Distributed by: Vtape
- Release date: 2003 (One Minute Festival)
- Running time: 1 minute
- Country: Canada
- Language: English

Denominations is a 2003 Canadian short experimental documentary film created by video artist Daniel Cockburn about some time spent with American video artist Joe Gibbons.

== Synopsis ==
A screenshot from Denominations

The title refers to denominations of currency. The American video artist Joe Gibbons is in Daniel Cockburn's kitchen one morning during which they compare cameras. While this is taking place, a text scrolls up the left hand side of the screen, describing and commenting on the scene itself (Joe is a "self-professed sociopath" from "Massachusetts (USA)"), but also describing events that take place off screen later in the morning when they go for brunch.

Joe Gibbons appears in the film as himself. Cockburn refers to the short as a "docu-anecdote" and suggests that the phrase "a penny for your thoughts" is subject to an exchange rate in practice.

== Production background ==
In the mid-2000s, Cockburn was making several videos and short films any given year. In 2003, in addition to Denominations, he made WEAKEND, The Impostor (hello goodbye), and the first version of AUDIT.

Joe Gibbons described himself as a sociopath in Confessions of a Sociopath, his "semi(?)-autobiographical masterwork", for which he won an award in 2001, and which Cockburn curated in Toronto in 2003.

== Release and reception ==
The short was screened at the 2003 One Minute Film & Video Festival in Toronto, where it won the Special Jury Prize.
