= Connie Zheng =

Chinese-American artist

- Education: Brown University; University of California, Berkeley; University of California, Santa Cruz
- Occupations: Artist; writer; filmmaker

Connie Zheng is a Chinese-born artist, writer, and filmmaker based in Oakland, California. Her projects include large-scale maps, seed exchanges, seed-making workshops, and experimental films about seeds. Themes in Zheng's work include navigating diasporic memory, ecological transformation, and relationships between human and more-than-human worlds.

== Education ==
Zheng received two BAs, Economics and English, from Brown University, Providence, RI and an MFA in Art Practice from the University of California, Berkeley. She is currently a PhD student in Visual Studies at the University of California, Santa Cruz.

== Career ==
=== Exhibitions ===
Zheng's work has been exhibited at the Asian Art Museum, the Contemporary Jewish Museum, SOMArts Gallery, and Thacher Gallery at the University of San Francisco in San Francisco, CA; Singapore Art Week; Framer Framed, Amsterdam, the Netherlands, and the IMPAKT Festival in the Netherlands, among others.

Most recently, Zheng 2023 three piece work entitled Guest Passage has been featured Bay Area Now 9 at Yerba Buena Center for the Arts.

=== Awards ===
Zheng has received fellowships and residencies from the Headlands Center for the Arts, Sausalito, CA; the Oak Spring Garden Foundation, Upperville, VA, and the Minnesota Street Project Foundation, San Francisco, CA, among others.

Zheng was the inaugural recipient of the Joint Space Award, awarded by The Space Program San Francisco and the Minnesota Street Project Foundation.

=== Publications ===
Zheng's work has been published in Hyperallergic, KQED Arts, and MUBI Notebook, among others.

Zheng wrote a chapter for the Routledge Companion to Contemporary Art, Visual Culture, and Climate Change published in 2021. She has also contributed to SFMOMA's Open Space blog.
