= Weakend =

Weakend could refer to:

- WEAKEND, 2003 experimental short film
- "Weakend" from the 2022 album And I Have Been by Benjamin Clementine
- Misspelling of weekend
- Misspelling of "weakened"
