= The Other Shoe (film) =

2001 experimental short film

- Title frame
- Directed by: Daniel Cockburn
- Written by: Daniel Cockburn
- Produced by: Daniel Cockburn
- Edited by: Daniel Cockburn
- Production companies: ZeroFunction Productions, LIFT
- Distributed by: Vtape
- Release date: 2001
- Running time: 5 minutes
- Country: Canada
- Language: English

The Other Shoe is a 2001 Canadian short experimental film by video artist Daniel Cockburn, his third, which, along with Metronome (2002), earned a mention for the Homebrew Award when shown at the Images Festival and thereby broadened his reputation beyond Toronto.

== Themes ==
=== Time in the cinema ===
The main theme of The Other Shoe is the cinematic perception of time, which is compressed or elongated into a singular experience, for which insight Cockburn acknowledges Andrei Tarkovsky. Cockburn remarks that the contemporary trend in cinema is speed and diversion, except in advertising where one finds many static shots: "We have learned that slowness can be appreciated, but only briefly; slownesses thus follow one another with great rapidity, as refreshing as ice cubes shooting out of a volcano." Cockburn is convinced that "longer attention span means greater capability of complex thought, means greater empowerment", adding that he is not fixated on "slowness" and that there are other means of foregrounding time, which he does with rhythm in Metronome and Stupid Coalescing Becomers, a "backwards time fantasy".

=== Media and multitasking ===
Cockburn was surprised to find that the finished film was as much about hypertext and multitasking as it was about his original intentions. According to the LIFT programme, The Other Shoe "straddles the line between media, questioning its validity on either side." The short engages its viewers in "the conflict between contemplation and multitasking," while trying to avoid "shoot[ing] itself in the foot."

== Production ==
The short film was Daniel Cockburn's third following Doctor Virtuous (1999) and Rocket Man (2000). It was also his first widescreen motion picture.

=== Commission ===
The Other Shoe was a commission for the 20th anniversary of LIFT (The Liaison of Independent Filmmakers of Toronto). Cockburn was one of fifteen film and video artists given cash and equipment to create short works "that would be personal responses" to the theme Self & Celluloid: The Future. Cockburn has long had technophobic tendencies, in particular of digital video as a medium, and has claimed to have created The Other Shoe "solely in dismayed response" to his discovery that the commissioned works of which The Other Shoe was a part would be streamed online: "That may be fine for some people, I thought — without (much) prejudice — but not for those of us who still relish the surrender of darkened-theatre viewing."

=== Filming and editing ===
The director's solution to the anxieties created for him by the live-streaming aspect of the project was to make a double projection of both 16 mm film and video, with the video portion designed to be streamed on the Internet, while the film portion could only be seen by the audience who attended the screening, a practice which Cockburn later called "simplistic film fetishism" on his part.

Cockburn's method for achieving "slowness" was to place single takes in a multi-frame context, something he did again in The Impostor (hello goodbye). Looking back a few years later, he said these portions of The Other Shoe were some of the relatively few shots he had ever made that he found "really aesthetically pleasing."

== Release and reception ==
As part of the LIFT 20th Anniversary programme, The Other Shoe premiered in Toronto in 2001 and toured Canada through 2002.

=== Critical and audience response ===
Stephen Lan saw the short at the Images Festival in April 2002, calling it "thoughtful and philosophical... clever and witty." Response to The Other Shoe surprised Cockburn, who wrote in October 2001 that he derived a "humbling joy" from knowing that a work made with his "simple-minded" intentions could, in "failing to fully make its point," nevertheless be "engagingly conflicted and complex".

=== Accolade ===
- Images Festival, honorable mention for the Homebrew Award (Best Local Emerging Artist) jointly with Metronome, 2002

== Related work ==
monopedal Joy (2001)

Cockburn made use of outtakes to create the short music video monopedal Joy, a 16 mm projection captured and edited in camera on Mini DV and subsequently mastered to Betacam.
