= You Are In a Maze of Twisty Little Passages, All Different =

- Directed by: Daniel Cockburn
- Written by: Daniel Cockburn
- Starring: Daniel Cockburn; Emily Vey Duke
- Cinematography: Daniel Cockburn; Chris MacLean
- Edited by: Daniel Cockburn; Hilda Rasula
- Music by: Alexander Glenfield
- Animation by: Daniel Cockburn
- Production company: ZeroFunction Productions
- Distributed by: Vtape
- Release date: 5 December 2009 (Canada (limited))
- Running time: 55 minutes
- Country: Canada
- Language: English

You Are In a Maze of Twisty Little Passages, All Different: Films and Videos by Daniel Cockburn is a 2009 Canadian experimental film anthology consisting of a curated programme of eleven short films by video artist Daniel Cockburn.

== Synopsis ==
=== AUDIT ===
An attempt to graph the shape of a human life through animation, with all its coincidences and repetitions.

- 2003, 3 minutes, Super 8 with audio CD

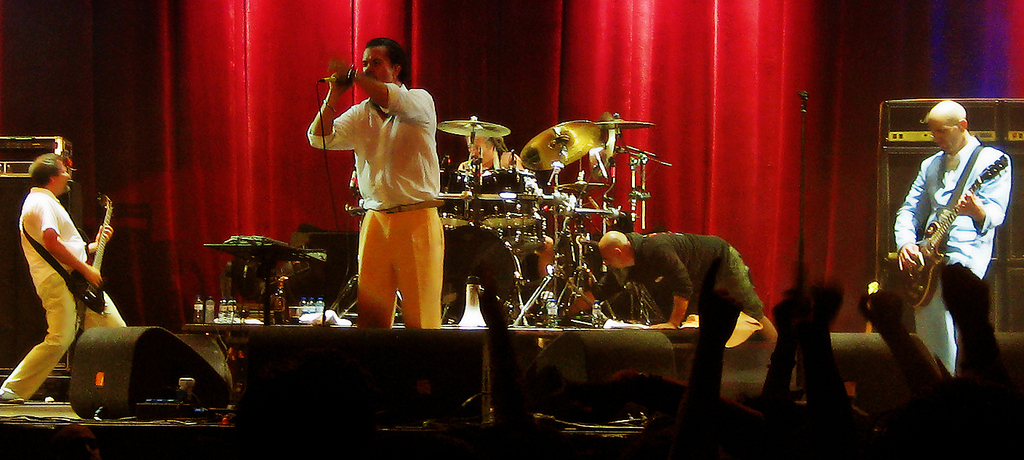
Faith No More in 2009

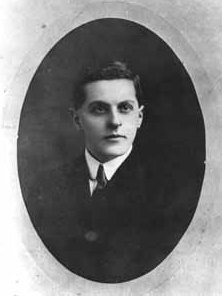
Texts by Ludwig Wittgenstein appear in IdeaL and Metronome.

=== IdeaL ===
Texts by Ludwig Wittgenstein are set against lyrics by the cock rock band Faith No More in a "1-to-1 syllable-to-syllable ratio."

- 2003, 3 minutes, video

=== Rocket Man ===
A karaoke muzak video version of Elton John / Bernie Taupin's Rocket Man set to clips of fifty years' worth of American space films like Forbidden Planet and Lost in Space.

- 2001, 5 minutes, video

=== Metronome ===
An artist goes through his day keeping to a steady rhythm. All the while, his voice-over speaks rapidly, discussing mental patterns in life, language, rhythm, as well as determinacy and free will. He talks about Hollywood films that have inspired him, and appropriated clips flow along with the artist's own footage. He wonders how many of his daily thoughts are his own, as opposed to ideas coming from films or indeed the rest of his life experience.

- 2002, 11 minutes, video
  - Images Festival • (honorable mention, with The Other Shoe) Homebrew Award for work by a local emerging artist
  - Media City Film Festival • Jury Award for best Canadian film/video/installation

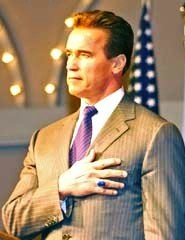
Arnold Schwarzenegger in 2004

=== WEAKEND ===
Video and audio of Arnold Schwarzenegger as Adam Gibson from The 6th Day is reworked by a videomaker. The manipulation stops with the arrival of the Sabbath, when the videomaker rests, and the Schwarzenegger of his creation speaks angrily for himself, and the videomaker answers.

- 2003, 7 minutes, video
  - Tranz Tech Media Art Biennial • FAMEFAME Jury Prize

=== The Impostor (hello goodbye) ===
In a split screen, a man dressed in a black suit and tie speaks directly to the audience, while a black and white home movie is being projected next to him, on the left. He describes a dream in which he was asked to read a eulogy for his father. The man wonders if his words killed his father.

- 2003, 9 minutes, video; commissioned for The Colin Campbell Sessions and inspired by the makings of video art pioneer Colin Campbell

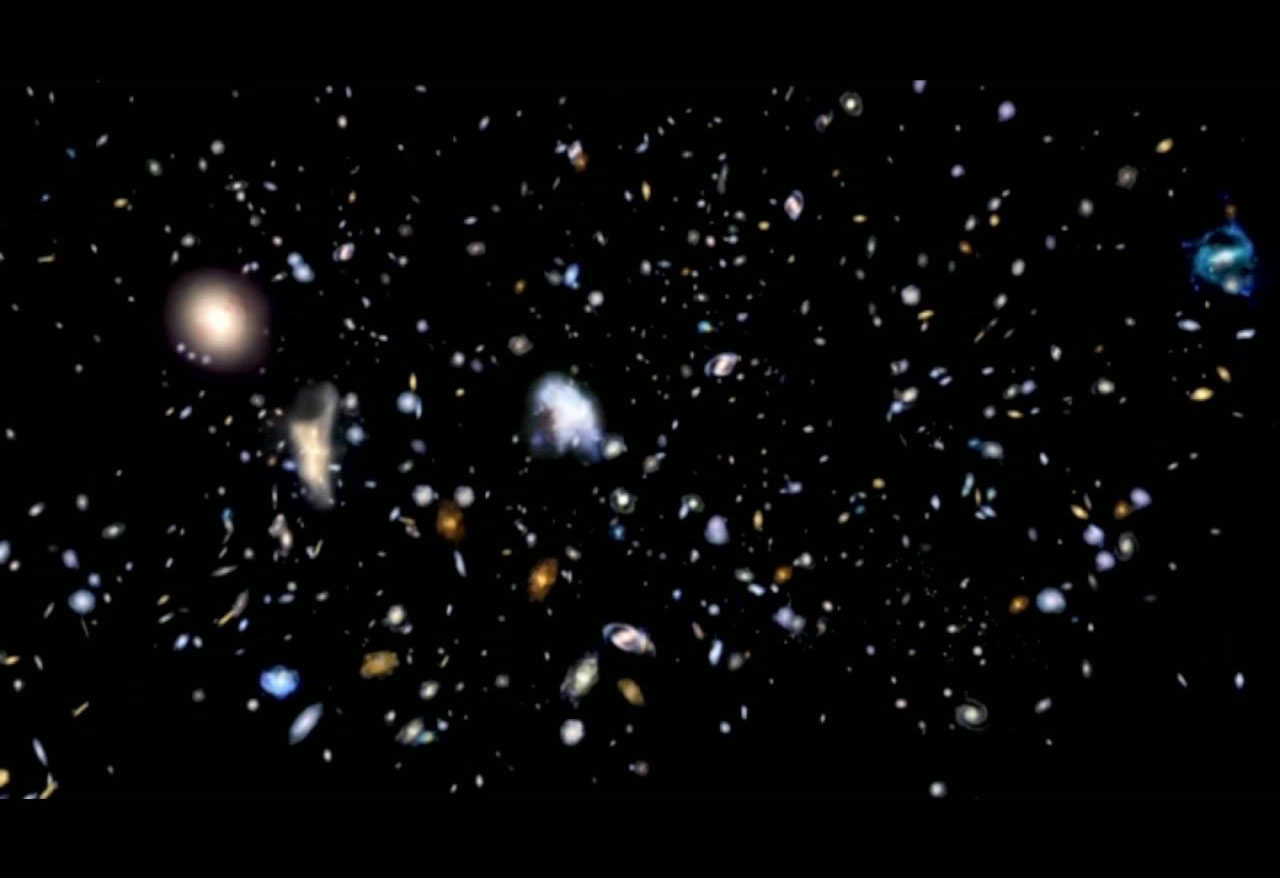

=== Nocturnal Doubling ===
As a metred beat thumps, and a metred line is pulled across the screen, a narrator asserts with certainty that the entire universe expanded to twice its size overnight.

- 2004, 4 minutes, video; based on a thought experiment in Henri Poincaré's essay The Relativity of Space

=== Figure Vs. Ground ===
Emily supplied him with a clip of her singing on a boat, which he promptly layered up into a dizzying multi-screen display that buried her "figure" beneath his "ground." Emily dubbed his aggressive material assertions "like being gang raped by video."

— Mike Hoolboom

A journey from cacophony to harmony.

- 2004, 7 minutes, video; a collaboration with fellow video artist Emily Vey Duke, commissioned by the 640 480 video collective for the VS. programme

=== Stupid Coalescing Becomers ===
A "backwards time fantasy" in which a narrator lashes out at the "little opposite rebellions" he sees in which everything is reversed: "paper uncuts itself, cigarettes unsmoke, broken lightbulbs re-form, pills re-gather and in the final image, the artist himself flies out of the frame."

- 2004, 2 minutes, video

=== This Thing Is Bigger Than the Both of Us: These Are Facts ===
A shadowy figure speaks in a modulated whisper attempting to guess what sort of video artist Matthew C. Brown made for the One Minute Film & Video Festival (This Thing Is Bigger Than the Both of Us: The Secret of String).

- 2007, 1 minute, video

=== AUDIT (version 2) ===
Another, different attempt to graph the shape of a human life through animation.

- 2005, 3 minutes, Super 8 with audio CD

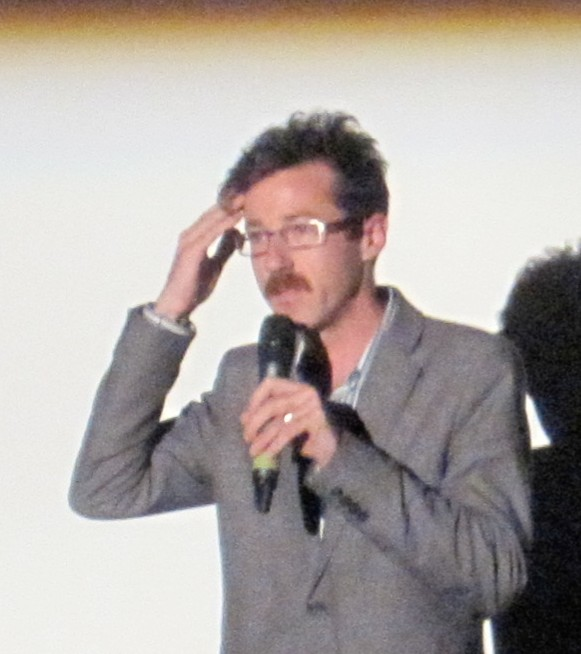
Daniel Cockburn

== Genre and themes ==
The guide for the 2011 Impakt Festival suggests Daniel Cockburn's films are found at the intersection of avant-garde and narrative cinema, combining innovative storytelling strategies and structuralist experimentation, breaking open "day-to-day reality to reveal the strange codes beneath."

Self-reflexive to the point of neurosis, Cockburn is fascinated with how moving images can illuminate the structures and rhythms of our lives; he is forever looking for hidden meaning in randomness and patterns in chaos.

== Production and related works ==
In 2009, Cockburn was invited to a six-month fellowship in Berlin (DAAD Artists-in-Berlin Program), where he began showing a curated programme of his films and videos. An anthology film tour was coordinated by curator Jon Davies (Pleasure Dome) with the support of the Canada Council for the Arts.

Cockburn returned to Toronto toward the end of the year with a revised programme which also saw the launch a publication about his work. The catalogue, also titled You Are in a Maze of Twisty Little Passages all Different, was edited by Daniel Cockburn and Jon Davies, and included five commissioned essays by video artists Steve Reinke and Emily Vey Duke, author Sheila Heti, filmmaker Spencer Parsons, and theoretical physicist Lee Smolin.

== Release and reception ==
The final version of You Are in a Maze of Twisty Little Passages all Different was screened in Toronto on 5 December 2009. In addition to the eleven shorts which form the core of the standard programme, the Pleasure Dome screening included The Chinese Room (a ten-minute work-in-progress excerpt from Cockburn's upcoming feature, You Are Here) and Matthew C. Brown's This Thing Is Bigger Than The Both Of Us: The Secret Of String. The 2011 Impakt Festival version switches The Chinese Room with Material (2011), the short Cockburn made for the National Parks Project.

=== Home media ===
A 55-minute DVD (for exhibitions and educational institutions) of the definitive (Toronto) version of the anthology film was released in 2009.

=== Critical response ===
Norman Wilner wrote a brief retrospective review of Cockburn's work in advance of the Pleasure Dome event in Toronto:

Cockburn's work is strange and recursive and curious and enthralling, and sometimes all at once. In works like Metronome and The Impostor (hello goodbye), he considers life, death and dreams - and dreams about death - with a childlike fascination and an adult's sense of gravity. He'll ponder the collective illusion of time in Stupid Coalescing Becomers, or investigate his suspicion that everything in the universe has doubled in size overnight in the aptly titled Nocturnal Doubling. Calmly offering philosophical and metaphysical insights on the audio track, while evidence of his thesis plays out on the screen, he's both prankster and serious inquisitor; there's no way anything he's talking about is even plausible, let alone probable, but he's going to explore the possibilities as if it were.
