= All the Mistakes I've Made =

Performance

All The Mistakes I've Made
- Still image from the multimedia performance (a screenshot from Peewee's Big Adventure)
- Artist: Daniel Cockburn
- Year: 2009
- Type: Performance art, anti-art
- Subject: Mistakes in films, film criticism
- Location: Berlin, Toronto, Utrecht, etc.

All The Mistakes I've Made is the common title of a pair of distinct performance/lecture pieces conceived and performed by Canadian video artist Daniel Cockburn.

== All The Mistakes I've Made ==
Every film I've ever made seemed like a good idea at the time.

— Daniel Cockburn, All The Mistakes I've Made performance in Berlin

I promise to try to be sincere, and to be -- for the most part -- forthcoming about the ways in which I fail to be sincere. It will perhaps be shown that my regrets constitute a parallel body of work... It could be described as a live version of one of my videos -- in which case it is possible that the presentation will make all the same mistakes the videos have.

— Daniel Cockburn, statement issued in advance of All The Mistakes I've Made performance in Berlin

=== Content ===
Daniel Cockburn revisits some of his early short films and "walks the audience through the pros and cons of being a visual artist." Examples include a karaoke-style revamp of Rocket Man and an overlooked element due to his having taken shots in his bedroom, the latter of which he ascribes to laziness. Besides mistakes made while making films, Cockburn also confesses to misunderstanding the works of other filmmakers, and discusses works by Andrei Tarkovsky and Tim Burton.

=== Background and concept ===
During an artist's residency in 2009 in Berlin, Daniel Cockburn developed an anti-artist talk, also called a "lecture-performance" about his professional mistakes as an artist: technical, aesthetic, and ideological. "The art world is bursting with events where artists present an anthology of the highlights of their career to a slightly bored audience." Cockburn decided to turn this idea on its head, examining to what extent his own inability to properly judge might be representative of a "negative trend" in contemporary art and cinema, supporting this argument with excerpts from his own work, and that of artists like Andrei Tarkovsky and Tim Burton.

Cockburn gave an interview in Osnabrück ahead of a performance there in 2012, saying that during the programme he was half himself and half artificial persona, that it all begins quite personally but ends apocalyptically.

=== Performances ===
Cockburn performed All The Mistakes I've Made from 2009 to 2013, touring internationally. In Osnabrück, it was advertised in German as Alle meine Fehler.

On at least one occasion, he playfully retitled the performance a few minutes in, to Some of the Mistakes I've Made.

=== Reception ===
Cockburn's lecture-performance is described as "funny, quirky, and insightfully self-deprecating", and "both playful and profound, personal and wide-reaching in its meditation on creative misguidance."

== All The Mistakes I've Made (Part 2) ==
All The Mistakes I've Made (Part 2)
- Poster
- Artist: Daniel Cockburn
- Year: 2015
- Type: Performance art
- Subject: Mistakes in films; film criticism
- Location: Utrecht, Toronto, Manchester, etc.
- Preceded by: All The Mistakes I've Made

=== Content ===
Cockburn begins with a look at 1990s horror movies (two 1994 films in particular, John Carpenter's In the Mouth of Madness and Wes Craven's New Nightmare), "by way of illuminating both the redemptive and destructive powers of storytelling." He then takes the audience on an autobiographical journey "full of film references, over-interpretation and paranoia." Cockburn also argues against finding fault with continuity errors, as he says in an essay derived from the performance:

We never would have noticed, if you hadn't pointed it out to us. IMDB users of the world: does it make you feel good to find mistakes in a world's construction? ... Film is joinery. That's what it is, what it does. So there's no point in getting indignant or superior when the joins aren't in line with what you think they ought to be.

=== Background and concept ===
Sometimes also featuring a subtitle (How Not To Watch a Film) or alternate title (How Not to Watch a Movie and even How To Not Watch a Movie), Cockburn's similarly titled and -themed performance is not, despite the titular suggestion, strictly a sequel to All The Mistakes I've Made, but rather a spiritual successor to the original performance, "an independent, stand-alone work."

=== Reception ===
Like his "exuberantly cerebral, filmically deconstructionist" work in film and video, the performance defies easy categorization, located at an intersection of filmmaking, criticism, academia, performance art, and personal confession. And, like the original performance, Cockburn's multimedia presentation has been met with "much acclaim." Calum Marsh calls it "part scholarly monologue, part real-time essay film, and part solo theatre":

A bit like Spalding Gray with PowerPoint. All the Mistakes I've Made (Part 2) is about the cinema, and it is smart and amusing. Better still is its curt punch line, provided by none other than Paul Schrader – a sight gag worth the price of admission.
