= Sculpting Memory =

2015 Canadian short artistic video celebrating the work of Atom Egoyan

- Directed by: Daniel Cockburn
- Written by: Daniel Cockburn
- Produced by: Justine Pimlott (executive producer: Anita Lee)
- Cinematography: Cabot McNenly
- Edited by: Duff Smith
- Music by: Lev Lewis
- Production companies: National Film Board of Canada in association with; National Arts Centre and; Governor General's Performing Arts Awards Foundation
- Release date: 30 May 2015
- Running time: 5 minutes
- Country: Canada
- Language: English

Sculpting Memory (French: Au fil de la mémoire) is a 2015 Canadian short artistic video directed and written by Daniel Cockburn which profiles and celebrates the body of work of Canadian director Atom Egoyan commissioned for the occasion of the 2015 Canadian Governor General's Performing Arts Awards, where Egoyan was presented with a Lifetime Artistic Achievement Award.

== Synopsis ==
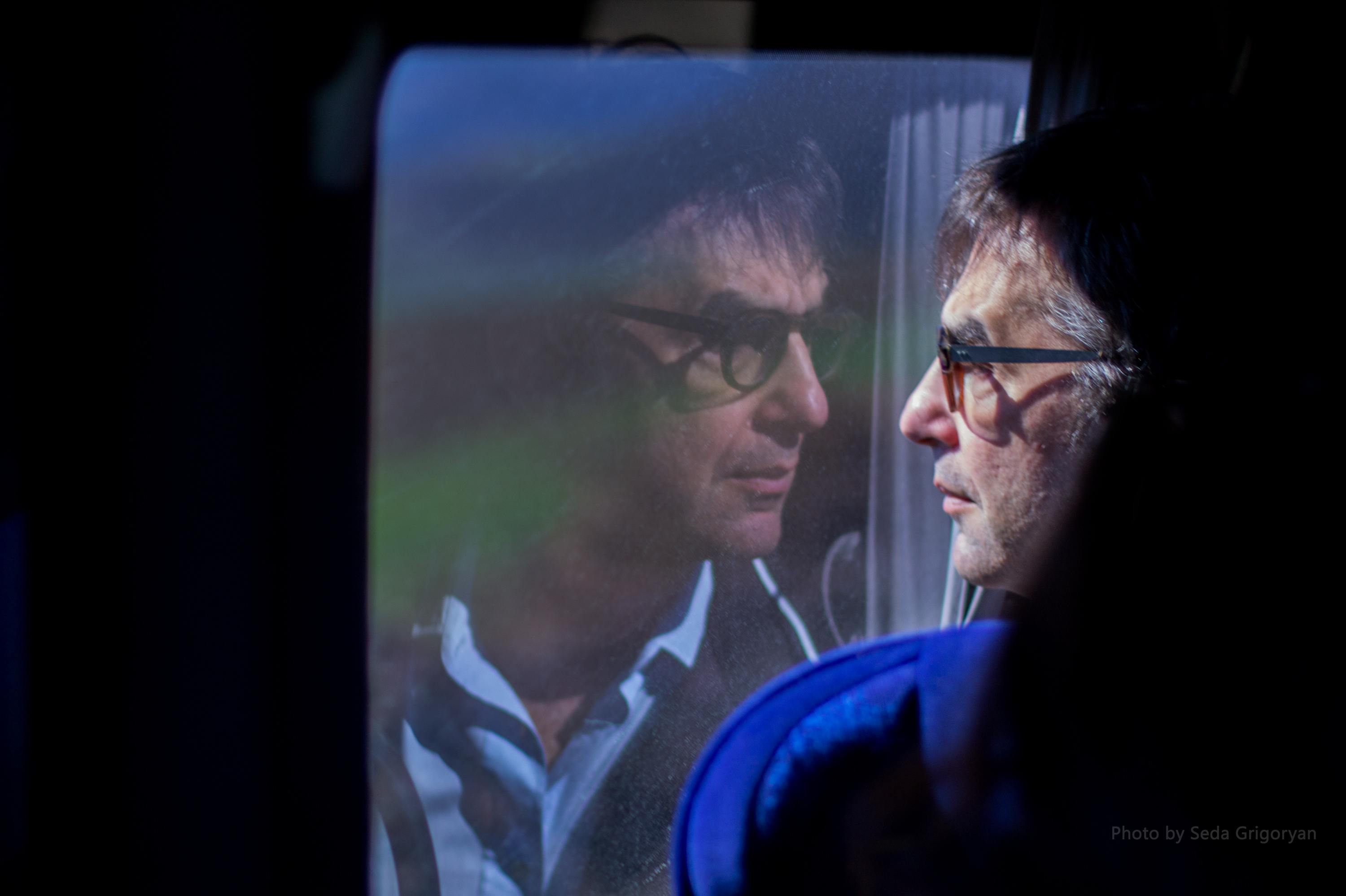
Atom Egoyan in 2017

Atom Egoyan is shown setting up several television sets in a large room. The television sets show excerpts from Egoyan's films Next of Kin, Family Viewing, Calendar, The Adjuster, The Sweet Hereafter, Speaking Parts, Exotica, A Portrait of Arshile, and Citadel.

== Themes ==
Sculpting Memory literally surrounds Atom Egoyan with his own films, a conceptual move referencing Egoyan's adaptation of Samuel Beckett's Krapp's Last Tape (for the project Beckett on Film), as well as "evoking Egoyan's own work as a moving-image installation artist and his concern with the recording and displaying of images."

== Production background ==
Sculpting Memory is one of seven films made to honour achievements by seven laureates of the 2015 Governor General's Performing Arts Awards. At the time of production, Cockburn had returned to his alma mater York University to earn his Master of Fine Arts degree in 2014.

The short film features an original score by Lev Lewis.

== Release ==
The seven short films were released online on 30 May 2015. The films are available on the National Film Board Online Screening Room, as well as through its apps for smartphones, tablets and connected TV, and in The Performing Arts in Canada: A Celebration, the GGPAA e-book.
