= European Media Art Festival =

Annual festival and congress for film in Osnabrück, Germany

- Location: Osnabrück, Germany
- Founded: 1981
- Language: International
- Website: www.emaf.de www.emaf.de/en (English)

The European Media Art Festival (officially abbreviated as EMAF) is an annual festival and congress for film and media art which takes place every April/May in Osnabrück, Germany.

== Overview ==
The festival offers its visitors a current overview of experimental films, installations, performances, digital art, and hybrid forms, ranging from personal and political subjects or formal experiments to provocative statements about media art and society. The Festival sees itself as a place of experimentation and a laboratory where extraordinary works, experiments and ventures are created and presented. It is the largest showcase of experimental short films and feature films, digital art, animation, and multimedia, in the world of media art, presenting as many as 250 works out of up to 2500 entries during an event attended by about 14,000 participants as of 2018. The festival has an "open policy" with room for projects ranging from "process-based experiments and technological innovations to dexterous crossovers between the media and genres." Students are included as filmmakers, exhibitors and visitors.

== History ==
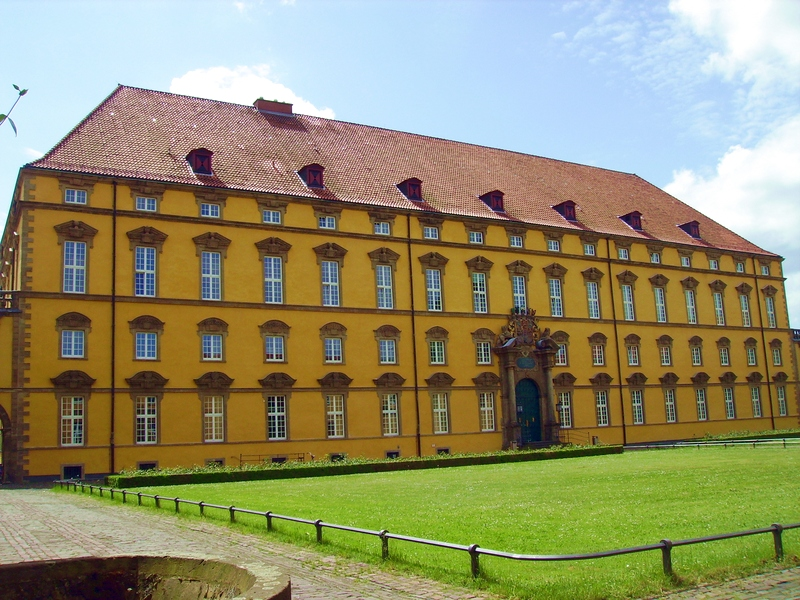
Osnabrück Castle, main building of the University of Osnabrück (view from the inner court)

The European Media Art Festival started in 1981 as an experimental film workshop (the official organising body is still called the "Experimentalfilm Workshop"), with the intention of providing a platform of expression for innovative and experimental art from the genres of film, video, multimedia and new media. The first workshop was organised by the Department of Media Studies at the University of Osnabrück. In 1988, the "Film and Television Year" proclaimed by the European Economic Community offered an opportunity to expand the workshop into something greater. A team of students developed the concept under the new title "European Media Art Festival".

== Notability ==
The European Media Art Festival is well-covered in regional media, with summaries in national dailies and trade papers as well as in magazines on art, movies and multimedia; there is also commercial and public broadcast coverage in regional and national programmes. The Festival is considered one of the most important media art festivals in Europe (and worldwide), attended by German and European producers, European TV companies, representatives of festivals, academies, agencies and distributors, setting trends in the international media art scene, highlighting socially-relevant events and giving artists an opportunity to be heard and established, defining itself above all as the avant-garde of media art and promoter of young media creators.

The Festival has featured film retrospectives by important international artists such as Shelly Silver, Michael Snow, Peter Greenaway, Fernando Birri, Al Razutis and David Rimmer.

== Awards ==
The European Media Art Festival has presented up to four awards and prizes each year (values as of 2018):

- EMAF Award (€5,000), for a trendsetting work in media arts
- Newcomer Award (€1,500)
- Dialogue Award for the Promotion of Intercultural Exchange (€1,500), awarded by the German Ministry of Foreign Affairs (German: Dialogpreis des Auswärtigen Amtes)
- German Film Critics Prize (Best German Experimental Film/Video, €1,000), awarded by the Association of German Film Critics (German: EMAF-Medienkunst-Preis der Deutschen Filmkritik)

The deadline for submission of material to be presented each year is in January.

== Other activities ==
The Festival also functions as a distributor of experimental and media art works through cooperation with numerous cinemas and museums as well as the Goethe Institute's international affiliates, organizing tour packages of films and videos through the Experimental Film Workshop, booked and presented in non-commercial cinemas, galleries, museums and other national and international cultural locations. These have included tours across Germany, other European countries, as well as to Australia, Brazil, China, Japan, Lebanon, Mexico, New Zealand, Russia and the U.S.

== Themes ==
Since 2000, the Festival has been organized according to a particular theme:

EMAF THEMES
Year	Theme	Ref.
2000	Now Future	
2001	Inside Outside	
2002	Colour	
2003	Larger than Life	
2004	Transmitter	
2005	Document	
2006	Smart Art	
2007	20 Years of Being Confused	
2008	Identity	
2009	The future lasts longer than the past	
2010	Mash Up	
2011	This is Media Art	
2012	25 years Jubilee	
2013	Mapping	
2014	We, the enemy	
2015	Irony - subversive interventions in media art	
2016	The Future of Visions: Don't expect anything	
2017	Push - living in the hyper information age	
2018	Report - notes from reality	
2019	Wild grammar	
2020	First Person Plural	
2021	Possessed	
2022	The Thing Is	
2023	Trembling Time	
2024	Feelers, Sensors	
