= Emily Vey Duke =

Canadian-born visual artist

- Born: 1972 (age 52–53); Halifax, Nova Scotia, Canada
- Education: University of Illinois at Chicago
- Website: http://dukeandbattersby.com/wp/

Emily Vey Duke (born 1972, Halifax, Nova Scotia, Canada) is a Canadian-born visual artist who has worked collaboratively with Cooper Battersby since 1994. She is an associate professor in the Department of Film and Media Arts at the College of Visual and Performing Arts at Syracuse University.

== Career ==
Prior to her completion of university, in 1995, Duke was in a local Halifax band called Popularity Contest, which played in and around Halifax during the height of Maritime rock scene. Duke also released a self-titled, eight-song cassette in 1995.

Duke completed a Bachelor of Fine Arts at the Nova Scotia College of Art and Design in Halifax, Nova Scotia. After graduating, Duke worked as the artistic director at the Khyber Centre for the Arts in Halifax in 2004. She also went on to complete her Master of Fine Art degree at the University of Illinois at Chicago in 2004.

Duke and Battersby were featured artists at the Images Festival in 2016 and were nominated for the Sobey Art Award for Aliant New Media Prize in 2005 and the Atlantic Canada Prize 2010. In 2015, Duke and Battersby won the Grand Prize at the European Media Arts Festival for their video Dear Lorde.

Duke has exhibited at the Vancouver Art Gallery, the Whitney Museum, and the Institute of Contemporary Art in Philadelphia. Additionally, Duke and Battersby participated in the International Film Festival of Rotterdam. Her video work is distributed by V-Tape in Toronto, Video Out in Vancouver, Argos in Brussels, and Video Data Bank in Chicago.

Duke also works as a writer and has been published in Border Crossings, Canadian Art, C Magazine, Fuse Magazine, and Mix Magazine.
