= Reaction shot =

Cinematic technique

In film production, cinematography and video production, a reaction shot is a shot which cuts away from the main scene in order to show the reaction of a character to it. The reaction shot is a basic unit of film grammar.

A reaction shot usually implies the display of some sort of emotion on the face of the actor being shown, and is thus most commonly a close-up shot (although a group of actors may be shown reacting together). A reaction shot is also generally bereft of dialogue, though this is not an absolute rule. Its main purpose is to show an emotional response to the immediately preceding action or words of another character in the scene, or to an event in the immediately preceding scene which may or may not involve another actor (e.g., an explosion, monster, empty room, etc.)

The assumption behind the logic of the reaction shot is that the emotional reaction of the actor being depicted will either advance the story, reveal character traits of the character in the reaction shot, or emphasize character traits of another character that were displayed in the action or dialog present in the preceding shot. A completely unemotional reaction may also be important if it provides information to the audience or is unexpected in the context of the scene.

Reaction shots can be especially critical in comedy, as the reaction of an actor or actors to a dramatic incident provides a psychological cue to the audience about how to respond to that incident themselves.

In some cases, the deliberate avoidance of showing a reaction shot can be used by a filmmaker to dramatic effect; for instance, if the filmmaker wishes to conceal a character's motivations by hiding their reaction to a particular event.

== See also ==
- Kuleshov effect
