= Norman Wilner =

Canadian film critic

- Occupations: Film critic and festival programmer
- Relatives: Mike Wilner (brother)

Norman Wilner is a Canadian film critic and festival programmer, best known as a longtime film critic for Toronto's alternative weekly newspaper Now.

Previously a writer for a variety of publications including the Toronto Star and Canadian editions of the Metro chain of newspapers, he joined Now in 2008 as its senior film writer. In a 2014 interview with Toronto Star writer Eric Veillette, he attributed his interest in film to the influence of his grandfather Percy, a longtime owner of Toronto's now-defunct Orpheum movie theatre. After Now was acquired by Media Central Corporation in 2019, making it a sister publication to Vancouver's The Georgia Straight, his reviews also sometimes appeared in that publication.

Shortly after Media Central announced that it was filing for bankruptcy in April 2022, he left the publication to take a job as a programmer for the Toronto International Film Festival's digital initiatives. Following the retirement of Steve Gravestock from the festival in late 2022, he became the festival's lead programmer for Canadian films beginning with the 2023 Toronto International Film Festival, before departing the festival programming team in 2025.

He has also served as secretary and vice-president of the Toronto Film Critics Association from 2008 to 2016, and as host of Someone Else’s Movie, a podcast where he interviews a film industry figure about other filmmakers' work that they admire.

His brother, Mike Wilner, is a sports writer for the Toronto Star and a former play-by-play announcer for Toronto Blue Jays games.
