= Steve Reinke =

Canadian video artist and filmmaker

- Born: June 5, 1963 (age 62); Eganville, Ontario, Canada
- Known for: Video artist
- Website: www.myrectumisnotagrave.com

Steve Reinke (born 1963) is a Canadian video artist and filmmaker.

== Life ==
Reinke was born June 5, 1963, in Eganville, Ontario, Canada. He lives and works in Chicago, Illinois, where he is a professor of Art Theory and Practice at Northwestern University. He received his M.F.A. from Nova Scotia College of Art and Design in 1993.

== Work ==
Reinke's best known work is The 100 Videos (1996) and consists of one hundred separate videos created between 1990 and 1996.

As a writer and editor, Reinke has co-edited Lux: A Decade of Artists' Film and Video, 2000 and published Everybody Loves Nothing: Video 1996-2004, 2004.

== Exhibitions ==
Reinke exhibited in the 2014 Whitney Biennial. He has additionally exhibited at the Museum of Modern Art, Pompidou Centre, Tate, National Gallery of Canada, International Film Festival Rotterdam and the New York Video Festival.

== Collections ==
Reinke's work is included in the permanent collections of the National Gallery of Canada and the Museum of Modern Art.

== Awards ==
In 2006, Reinke won the Bell Canada Award for Video Art, administered by the Canada Council for the Arts.

In April 2026, he was awarded the 2026 Guggenheim Fellowship in Film-Video.
