= Impakt Festival =

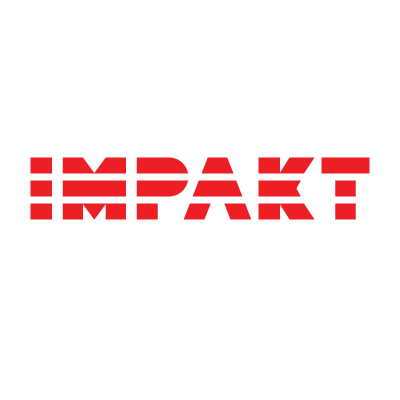
Logo of Impakt

The Impakt Festival is a yearly manifestation on media art, founded in 1988 in the city of Utrecht, Netherlands.

It showcases films, video art, performances, music, conferences and other special events with works from international artists. Dealing with questions about society, digital culture and media, the festival aims to tackle pressing questions from an interdisciplinary perspective.

== History ==
The Impakt Festival started in 1988 as a festival for experimental arts. Since its first edition the Impakt Festival has been offering a variety of events including video and film screenings, exhibitions, conferences, talks, concerts and dance nights. Besides the annual Panorama program, which is still Impakt's official selection of recent film and video productions, the festival also has a thematic program that is focused on contemporary matters. Interdisciplinarity is embraced and efforts for balance and multi-perspectiveness is preferred. Over the years, the festival has taken the form of a more thematic program. Impakt also operates an artist-in-residency scheme, outside of the annual festival, along with year-round events.

== 1990s ==
The 1990s editions were characterized by an, already proven, experimental research that formed a positive stimulus to the past image and soundculture and a necessary supplement to the mass media’s supply of entertainment. During those editions were screened works from Vito Acconci, Bruce Nauman, Mathias Muller, Bruce Conner, Bill Viola, Kurt Kren, Dereck Jarman and William Wegman.

== 2000s ==
As Impakt Festival's prestige as a European media art festival grew, the turn of the millennium saw a turn to focusing on a more specifically on an annual thematic program. Themes included:

2001 Group Formation
2002 Whatever Happened To All The Fun In The World?
2003 It's Happening Again: Fashion, Music, Politics
2004 Cultural Autopsy
2005 Adventures in Sound and Image
2006 The Great Outdoors
2007 Adventures in Sound and Image
2008 Yourspace
2009 Accelerated Living

During the 2000s editions, works from Annika Larsson, Magnus Wallin, Norman McLaren, Miranda July, Matthew Barney and Reynold Reynolds were screened at Impakt Festival, in addition to many others.

== 2010–present ==
=== Impakt Festival 2010 ===
Matrix City focused on the various different perceptions of what elements constitute a city and what a city should look like. Considerations, not only on geographical matters, but additionally on Utopianism were addressed through the programme.

=== Impakt Festival 2011 ===
2011 focused on the theme The Right to Know, in which Impakt dove into all dilemmas inherent in our modern data society, with conspiracy theories and cover-ups, digital dissidents and banned videos, data journalism and fear management, fine print messages and big secrets. The theme transpired to be extremely apt, as 2011 saw the onset of the Arab Spring and the prominence of WikiLeaks' rise.

The Centre for the Humanities (CfH) at Utrecht University, in collaboration with the department of New Media and Digital Culture and the Impakt Festival, initiated the CfH-Impakt Festival Fellowship. Mercedes Bunz acted as the festival fellow.

=== Impakt Festival 2012 ===
No More Westerns explored the decline in dominance of Western media culture. The programme explored shifting geopolitical landscapes on the world stage and aimed to preview the imminent changes in visual culture. Guest curators included Samantha Culp and Cher Potter, they stated that: "We hope to share some of the isolated charges and momentary signs we’ve noticed that indicate a new and imminent awareness – a set of cultural and social movements emerging from regions operating along alternative storylines to the west, in the spaces between pre-modernism and postmodernism".

Speakers of note included Parmesh Shahani, along with another collaboration with The Centre for the Humanities (CfH) at Utrecht University.

=== Impakt Festival 2013 ===
In 2013 the Impakt Festival investigated capitalism and the current economic crisis under the theme Capitalism: Catch-22 It asked questions, such as: whether capitalism is at the root of crises or actually the driving force behind progress? And, are there any viable alternatives?

Impakt selected three curatorial parties, representing a diverse programme: Amsterdam-based collective Monnik, British curator Benjamin Fallon and German film curator Florian Wüst.

=== Impakt Festival 2014 ===
Soft Machines: Where the Optimised Human Meets Artificial Empathy celebrated Impakt Festival's silver jubilee, in addition to probing the relationship between humanity and artificial intelligence. A. E. Benenson, Ken Farmer, Noah Hutton and Dr. Leah Kelly acted as guest curators for the programme.

Highlights included Bruce Sterling, pioneer of the Cyberpunk literary genre, presenting the key-note speech of the festival, in collaboration with the Studium Generale Utrecht University, as well as a presentation of new work by Floris Kaayk (recipient of the 2014 Volkskrant Beeldende Kunst Prijs). Additionally, Dutch graphic design team, Metahaven's music video for Holly Herndon's Interference, premiered alongside other Impakt Festival commissions.

=== Impakt Festival 2015 ===
Impakt Festival 2015 took place from 28 October- 1 November 2015, under the title The Future of History (in a World Well Documented). It offered reflections and new ideas on the future of history and on the future of the future, within the themes of ´The Better You´, ´Colossal Data´ and ´The Memory of Technology´.

The festival deviated from its traditional form in that the opening was conducted over two evenings, with keynotes from Daan Roosegaarde(in collaboration with HKU) and Evgeny Morozov (in collaboration with Hacking Habitat).

The rest of the festival was divided temporally between past, present and future over Friday, Saturday and Sunday, respectively. Additional keynote lectures on these days were: Evan Roth, Cécile B. Evans and Jason Scott, founder and maintainer of textfiles.com.

Additional artists and speakers over the weekend included: Olia Lialina, Geert Lovink, artistic director of Transmediale Kristoffer Ganzing, Mirko Tobias Schäfer, among many others.

=== Impakt Festival 2016 ===
Impakt Festival 2016 took place from 26–30 October 2016, under the title Authenticity?

It researched authenticity's various understandings and meanings, reflected upon its relevance as a business strategy; and instead of representing its suggested meaning, it functioned as a catalyst – reflecting and producing a theoretical background for authenticity in the post-digital age. During the festival the film programme Portraits was curated by Fireflies magazine and consisted of films by Pedro Costa and Ben Rivers, while the festival's exhibition called Authenticity is Dead, Long Live Authenticity! included works by Amalia Ulman, DIS (collective) and General Idea. Speakers during the festival were Franco Berardi, Chus Martínez, David Joselit among others.

=== Impakt Festival 2017 ===
The Festival took place from 25 until 29 October 2017 under the title Haunted Machines & Wicked Problems, and was curated by Natalie Kane & Tobias Revell.

=== Impakt Festival 2018 ===
The Festival of 2018 took place from 24 until 28 October 2018 under the title Algorithmic Superstructures, and was curated by Luba Elliott, Alex Anikina and Yasemin Keskintepe. The festival featured talks by Eliot Higgins of investigative collective Bellingcat, Adam Greenfield, Metahaven, Julia Kloiber, Evgeny Morozov a.o.

=== Impakt Festival 2019 ===
The 2019 Festival will take place from 30 October until 3 November.

== Festival Format ==
=== Location ===
The city of Utrecht, The Netherlands, provides the landscape for the festival. Events and screenings occur in various venues across the city. Popular, and often re-used, venues include Theatre Kikker, T’Hoogt and Ekko. The latter of these was one of the venues used when the festival was founded and is now used for live music and night-life events. In the past few years Impakt has made use of other venues for exhibitions, talks, conferences as Academie Galerie, Studio T (Utrecht University).

=== Festival Components ===
The main body of Impakt Festival is composed of its screening programmes. In recent years this has comprised around thematic focus in addition to a Panorama programme which showcases the best in innovative visual art. Speakers and panels, performances (often interactive) tend to focus on the year’s theme. Music nights are an integral part of the festival program: in the past years Toro y Moi, Kode9, James Blake, DJ Spinn and DJ Rashad, Demdike Stare and more played at Impakt Festival.

The closing night of the festival has seen a new tradition in the form of a YouTube battle. Festival participants and guests are invited to out-do one another using YouTube as a medium in a rap battle format.

== Additional Activities ==
=== Residency Programme ===
Impakt runs a year-round operation with a residency programme for artists. Previous artists in residence have included: James T. Hong (2011) and Andrew Norman Wilson (artist) (2013), among many others. Additionally, Impakt collaborates with LabMis, the production and research centre at São Paulo Museum of Image and Sound, in a two-way residency exchange between Brazil and The Netherlands. Previous exchange artists have included Rosa Menkman (2013).

=== Impakt Online ===
Impakt are in the process of digitising their screening history online. They include curatorial highlights from previous years, and additionally new commissions of Internet Art projects on their web gallery.

=== Non-festival Events ===
Impakt organises year-round events in addition to the annual festival. Past events have included a Film club, interactive lectures and performances by current artists-in-residency. March 2015 saw an event, 'Land of Desire', showcasing the work by Dutch Impakt artist-in-resident Donna Verheijden, and featuring a talk by eminent media theorist and founder of the Institute of Network Cultures Geert Lovink.

Additional events in 2015 have included showcases of work by Thiago Hersan and Dutch filmmaker Douwe Dijkstra.

Impakt curatorial programmes have also been screened at other festivals. A selection of highlights from the 2014 Soft Machines programme was screened at Athens Digital Arts Festival.
