= Images Festival =

Film festival

Coordinates: 43°40′N 79°23′W

- Location: Toronto, Ontario, Canada
- Website: http://www.imagesfestival.com

The Images Festival is a yearly event devoted to independent and experimental film, video art, new media and media installation that takes place each spring in Toronto.

== History ==
The Images festival was founded in 1987, originally conceived as an alternative to the Toronto Festival of Festivals (now known as Toronto International Film Festival). Originally titled Northern Visions, the inaugural board included Kim Tomczak, Paulette Phillips, Ross Turnbull, Marc Glassman, Annette Mangaard, Richard Fung, and Janine Marchessault. Since 2005, Images has also presented international tours of Canadian media artists.

== Festival ==
Images is the largest festival of experimental film and video in North America.

Premieres held at the Images festival include:

- Matthew Barney's Cremaster,
- Clive Holden's Trains of Winnipeg,
- G. B. Jones's The Lollipop Generation,
- Zacharias Kunuk's Nunaqpa,
- Barbara Sternberg's Like a Dream that Vanishes,
- Andrew Norman Wilson's Sidewalk Stories

Retrospectives of filmmakers such as Harun Farocki, Richard Fung, Nelson Henricks and Louise Bourque have also been featured.

In 2011, the festival partnered with the Art Gallery of Ontario to present John Sasaki's Pine series.
