= Vtape =

Artist-run centre in Toronto, Canada

Vtape is a Canadian artist-run centre located in Toronto, Ontario. It is Canada's largest distributor of video art, and the world's largest distributor of Indigenous and First People's film and video. The organization is run as a not for profit and is known for video art distribution, media preservation, exhibition programming, and training programs.

Vtape's collection features more than 1500 artists and consists of conceptual art videos, video art installation, performance-based works, and social issue documentaries. In January 2024, there were almost 10,000 titles in distribution.

All artists distributed by Vtape maintain full ownership of their work, and the organization does not require exclusive distribution rights. This model is seen in other Canadian video art distribution organizations Video In Video Out and Videopool.

== History ==
Vtape was established in 1980 by artists Lisa Steele, Susan Britton, Rodney Werden, Clive Robertson, Colin Campbell and Kim Tomczak with the mission to improve the distribution and dissemination of video art and to compensate artists fairly for their work. It was incorporated as a not-for-profit in 1983. Vtape provided organizational assistance for independent art exhibitions throughout the 1980s and 1990s during conditions of intensive censorship of artists' film and video works by the Government of Ontario.

== Aboriginal collection ==
Vtape began a dedicated collection of video works by Indigenous artists in 1994, after being approached by Zachary Longboy. It is the only specialized collection within the organization, and the only collection at Vtape that will accept works on film and works by first-time artists. Longboy helped develop the collection as Vtape's Aboriginal outreach coordinator, and was succeeded by Cynthia Lickers-Sage. As outreach coordinator, Lickers-Sage broadened the collection's reach through the establishment of the imagineNative Film Festival in 1998. The foundation of the Aboriginal Digital Access Project in 2012 broadened access to this special collection by allowing curators from around the world to preview video and film works online, rather than at the archive in person.

== References and further reading ==
- Gale, Peggy, Lisa Steele, George Elliott, Harold Innis, Marshall McLuhan, John Greyson, Marie-Hélène Cousineau et al. Video Re/View: The (Best) Source for Critical Writings on Canadian Artists' Video. (1996). ISBN 0920956378
- Ghaznavi, Corinna. "Lisa Steele and Kim Tomczak." Canadian Art 17.4 (2000): 68.
- Koostachin, Jules. "Remembering Inninimowin: The Language of the Human Beings." Canadian Journal of Law & Society/La Revue Canadienne Droit et Société 27, no. 1 (2012): 75–80.
