= Merike Talve =

Canadian curator and artist (1957–1997)

- Born: Merike Liz Talve; January 31, 1957; Vancouver, British Columbia, Canada
- Died: November 27, 1997 (aged 40); Vancouver, British Columbia
- Education: University of British Columbia, Emily Carr College of Art and Design
- Known for: Critical writing
- Notable work: "Vestiges of the Avant-Garde in Installation", Luminous Sites: Ten Video Installations(1986).
- Movement: Feminist art, Installation art, Media art
- Spouse: Jonathan Gary Fisher

Merike Talve (January 31, 1957 – November 27, 1997) was a Canadian curator, artist and independent writer who lived and worked in Vancouver, British Columbia, Canada. Her body of work was centred on Contemporary Artists exhibiting in Vancouver in the 1980s. Her writing contributed to the documentation of Vancouver art exhibition related activities during this time period. She was known for her writing and curatorial activities related to contemporary art, including installation art, time-based media art, and the feminist art movement.

== Early life and education ==
Merike Talve was born in Vancouver, British Columbia, Canada on January 31, 1957. She was a performer and a Rhythmic Gymnastics instructor in Richmond in 1976. Talve studied at Emily Carr College of Art and Design, where she earned a diploma in two-dimensional art. She earned a Bachelor of Arts degree in Art history from the University of British Columbia in 1981.

== Career ==
In the early 1980s, Talve worked for the Vanguard magazine and the Surrey Art Gallery in British Columbia, Canada. She was appointed as the curator to the Contemporary Art Gallery in Vancouver, British Columbia in 1987. Her curatorial activities at the Contemporary Art Gallery and Surrey Art Gallery included organizing exhibitions of the work of Canadian artists, such as Stan Douglas, Katherine Knight and Laura Vickerson, Kent Tate, Martin Honsich as well as writing critical reviews for exhibitions with artists, such as Paul Wong, Sara Diamond, Kim Tomczak, Vera Frenkel, among others.

Talve's body of work included essays and critical reviews, such as "Absense [sic] of Body Presence of Voice," from Voice Over (1985); Television Interference (1984); and Wallflower Order (1983). For the exhibition Luminous Sites: Ten Video Installations.(1986), In "Some Are Weather-Wise; Some Otherwise: Criticism and Vancouver," from the book Anthology: A Project of the Or Gallery (1991) William Wood examines "the question of who writes about what" in art criticism. Wood's cited Talve's critical review "Joey Morgan: Fugue" in Parachute magazine. In his essay, he discussed "genres of criticism." Wood described Talve's approach (in part) by stating that, "Talve settles into straight exposition, delaying any inflection of her description till the end. Her judgment at that point is a studied ambivalence, a trait shared by a good number of Morgan's reviewers." Talve's "Vestiges of the Avant-Garde in Installation", provided a conceptual and historical framework for this exhibition. Eugeni Bonet referred to Talve's essay "Vestiges of the Avant-Garde in Installation" in "La instalación como hipermedio (una aproximación)" from his book Escritos de vista y oído' (2016). In this essay, Bonet's cited in part Talve's views as follows,

Sin embargo, esta circunstancia posmoderna del arte de la instalacion no esta renida, en opion de merike talve, con el hecho de que pueda simultaneamente ser considerado como la unica de las formas contemporaneas de arte qu soporta directamente el peso de la vanguardia, tanto por recrear una interrelacion entre el arte y la realidad cotidiana – a traves de los elementos y cosas que extrae del prosaico entorno, como porque, muy a menudo, comporta un compromiso critico y etico caracteristico de las antagonias vanguardistas. [Talve, 1986]
However, this postmodern circumstance of installation art is not affected, in Merike Talve's opinion, with the fact that it can simultaneously be considered the only contemporary art form that directly supports the weight of the avant-garde, both for recreating an interrelation between art and everyday reality – through the elements and things that it extracts from the prosaic environment, such as because, very often, it involves a critical and ethical commitment characteristic of avant-garde antagonisms. [Talve, 1986] [sic]

Her work was published in Canadian art magazines, including the Vanguard magazine, ISSUE magazine, Video Guide, C Magazine, Parachute magazine, and the Parallelogramme. Her critical reviews included exhibitions that were presented at the Western Front Gallery Surrey Art Gallery, Or Gallery, UBC Fine Arts Gallery, Simon Fraser University Co-op Gallery, Emily Carr College of Art and Design Charles H. Scott Gallery, Non Commercial Gallery, Main Exit Gallery, Video Inn and Coburg Gallery in Vancouver.

== Published reviews/essays ==
- "Elizabeth MacKenzie." Vanguard (Jan 1983) 11.10: 19.
- "The Meat and the Mystery:" Lynn Hughes and Michael Jolliffe. Vanguard (Feb 1983) 12.1: 10–12.
- "Wallflower Order:" Marion Barling. Video Guide (Apr 1983) 5.2 [#22]: 5.
- "Street Culture:" Kim Tomczak, et al. Video Guide (1984) 6.4 [#29]: 4–5.
- "Third Hand:" Arni Runar Haraldsson. C Magazine (Fall 1984) 3 : 22–23.
- "Fugue:" Joey Morgan. Parachute 36 (Sep–Nov 1984): 64–65
- "Television Interference:" Paul Wong, et al. Video Guide (May 1984) 6.3 [#28]: 4-5.
- "Martin Honsich." Surrey Art Gallery (1985).
- "Absense of Body Presence of Voice," Voice Over: Sara Diamond et al. Contemporary Art Gallery (1985) 1–20 ISBN 0920751024.
- "Alan Storey's Draw." Vanguard (Feb 1985) 14: 44.
- "Crafty women and the hierarchy:" Kati Campbell. C Magazine (Winter 1985) 4: 19–21.
- "Vestiges of the Avant-Garde in Installation," Luminous Sites: Ten Video Installations: Vera Frenkel et al. Video In /Western Front (1986) 1–64, ISBN 0920974147.
- "Trigger:" Colette Urban. Vanguard (Sept 1987) 16: 29.
- "Installations:" Katherine Knight and Laura Vickerson. Surrey Art Gallery (1987) 1–8, ISBN 0920181147.
- "New sculptural works:" Daniel Laskarinet, et al. Contemporary Art Gallery (1988) 1–8, ISBN 0920751180.
- "Learning from salmon:" Deborah Koenker. Contemporary Art Gallery (1988) 1-8, ISBN 0920751199.
- "Repo:" Georgiana Chappell, et al. Contemporary Art Gallery (1988) 1-10, ISBN 0920751202.
- "The Stalker:" Kent Tate. Contemporary Art Gallery (1988) 1–12, ISBN 0920751210.
- "Television spots:" Stan Douglas. Contemporary Art Gallery (1988) 1–34, ISBN 0920751237.

== Personal life ==
Talve was married to Jonathan Gary Fisher. Her parents, Harri Talve and Marie (Õunpuu) Talve, met and married in Vancouver. Both her parents were born in Estonia. Harri, at the age of 13, relocated to Denmark due to displacement because of the war. Marie's family had relocated to Sweden. Harri immigrated to Canada in 1950 at age 20 and Marie in the early 1950s. The couple married and settled in Richmond. Merike Talve died in Vancouver on November 27, 1997.
