= Trinity Square Video =

Art centre in Toronto, Canada

- Established: 1971
- Location: Toronto, Canada
- Executive director: Beverly Moore
- Chairperson: Aljumaine Gayle

Trinity Square Video (TSV) is an artist-run centre in Toronto, Canada. It is a space to re-imagine media art and is known for supporting the production and exhibition of video-based work at the intersection of art and technology. It was founded in 1971 in the basement of the Church of the Holy Trinity near Dundas Square before the development of the Eaton Centre forced it to move. It is currently situated at 401 Richmond St W.

== History ==
Trinity Square Video was founded 1971 in the basement of the Toronto Church of the Holy Trinity by artists for the purpose of making video equipment easily accessible during the 1970s, a time when basic equipment was prohibitively expensive for independent artists. Artists who have created work at or with the assistance of Trinity Square Video include: John Greyson, Lisa Steele, Ed Sinclair, Jacqueline Hoàng Nguyễn, Michael Balser, Kim Tomczak, Vera Frenkel and Barbara Sternberg.

== Select exhibitions ==
- Worldbuilding (2017) Group Show.
- Two Days at the Falls (2015) Isabell Spengler
- ARCTICNOISE (2015) Geronimo Inutiq (a.k.a. dj madeskimo)
- Ice Fishing (2014) Jordan Bennett.
- Sculptural Video (2014) Group Show.
- Grand Gestures (2007) 640 480.

== Publications ==
- "wnoondwaamin | we hear them" touring exhibition (2016)
- ARCTICNOISE Catalogue (2015)
