= Rebel Girls: A Survey of Canadian Feminist Videotapes 1974–1988 =

Rebel Girls: A Survey of Canadian Feminist Videotapes 1974–1988 was an exhibition curated by Susan Ditta at the National Gallery of Canada that ran from 14 February 1989 to 21 May 1989 as part of the Video & Film by Artists Series.

The exhibition travelled in Canada from 7 June 1989 to 15 February 1990.

The exhibition was a major survey, featuring nearly 16 hours of running time, covering 14 years of production, and providing an "opportunity to gain an historical perspective on the use of the medium by Canadian feminist film producers."

== Exhibition details ==
The curator used the exhibition to address women's position in television and Canadian video production.

The chronological start of the show was Lisa Steele’s piece Birthday Suit – with scars and defects, produced in 1974. The other pieces, of which there were 32 tapes (counting Anne Ramsden’s trilogy Manufactured Romance as a single work), were organized by theme into seven programmes: The Body Politic, Requiem for Romance, The Personal is Political, Memory, Mythology, Desire, and She Works Hard for Her Money.

A common theme amongst many of the tapes is "elements of feminist video intervention (recording our histories, the personal as political, reclaiming the female body as subject rather than spectacle)". Other issues covered by the video work include lesbian sex, nudity, sexual harassment, and "slashing".

== Videos, artwork, and artists ==
Title	Date	Artist
Concerned Aboriginal Women	1981	Amelia Productions
Playing With Fire	1986	Marusya Bociurkiw
Scars	1987	Lorna Boschman
Delicate Issue	1979	Kate Craig
Heroics: Definitions	1984	Sara Diamond
Chaperons Rouges	1979	Helen Doyle and Hélène Bourgault
No Small Change: The Story of the Eaton's Strike	1985	Emma Productions
Relative Activities	1984	Paula Fairfield
The Last Screening Room: A Valentine	1984	Vera Frenkel
On Fait Toutes Du Show Business	1984	Nicole Giguere
Quebecoiserient	1976	Diane Heffernan and Suzanne Vertue
Hormone Warzone	1984	Hummer Sisters
Pure Virtue	1985	Tanya Mars
Frankly, Shirley	1987	Marg Moores
The Fleck Women	1978	Kem Murch
Life on Our Planet	1987	Tess Payne
Comptines	1986	Diane Poitras
Manufactured Romance	1985	Anne Ramsden
Birthday Suit – with scars and defects	1974	Lisa Steele
Hot Chicks on TV	1986	Elizabeth Vander Zaag
1932	1988	Susan Rynard
