= Birthday suit (disambiguation) =

Birthday suit is an informal term for the naked human body (as people are at birth).

Birthday suit may also refer to:

== Film and television ==
- Birthday Suit – with scars and defects, a 1974 work by video artist Lisa Steele
- "Birthday Suits," a 2007 episode of the television series Billable Hours
- "Birthday Suits," a 2007 episode of the television series Keeping Up with the Kardashians
- "Birthday Suit," a 2009 episode of the television series Life on Top
- "The Birthday Suits," a 2009 episode of the animated series Chowder

== Music ==
- The Birthday Suit, a Scottish rock band

=== Songs ===
- "Birthday Suit," a song from the Cosmo Sheldrake album The Much Much How How and I (2018)
- "Birthday Suit," a song performed by Johnny Kemp on the soundtrack of the 1989 film Sing
- "Birthday Suit," a song from the Pleasure P album The Introduction of Marcus Cooper (2009)
- "Birthday Suit," a song from the Saafir album Trigonometry (1998)
- "Birthday Suit," a song from the Sean Paul album Imperial Blaze (2009)
- "Birthday Suit," a song from the Weeknd's unreleased leaked EP The Noise (2009)
- "Birthday Suit," a track from Bill Engvall's 2009 comedy album Aged and Confused
- "Birthday Suit," a song from the Kesha album High Road (2020)
