= Fuse (magazine) =

Toronto-based Canadian non-profit arts and culture periodical

Fuse (stylized in all caps) was a Toronto-based Canadian non-profit arts and culture periodical published by Artons Cultural Affairs Society and Publishing Inc. Fuse was one of Canada’s longest running alternative art publications. Throughout its 38 year history, the focus has been the interchange between art, media, and politics. The magazine published its final issue in Winter 2013, under the editorial direction of Gina Badger.

== History ==
Centerfold, an arts newsprint magazine addressing the lack of critical discourse within artist-run culture, was founded in Calgary, Alberta, Canada in 1976. In 1978, Centerfold relocated to Toronto, and in 1980, the name of the magazine changed to Fuse. The focus of the magazine shifted from "an interdisciplinary artists" magazine to "a cultural news magazine". The publishers of Fuse incorporated as Artons Cultural Affairs Society and Publishing in 1984.

== Founding editors ==
Centerfold founding editors were Clive Robertson and Marcella Bienvenue. Continuing as Fuse after the November 1979 issue, the founding editors were Clive Robertson, Lisa Steele and Tom Sherman.

== Contributors ==
Early contributors to the magazine include:

- Bruce Barber
- Karl Beveridge
- Sara Diamond
- Richard Fung
- Peggy Gale
- John Greyson
- M. Nourbese Philip
- Tom Sherman
- Nell Tenhaaf
- Kim Tomczak
