= Merike =

Female given name

- Gender: Female
- Language: Estonian
- Name day: 22 April

Origin
- Region of origin: Estonia

Other names
- Derived: From meri, meaning "sea"
- Related names: Meeri, Meri, Merje

Merike is an Estonian feminine given name. The name is derived from the Estonian language word meri, meaning "sea", and was first proposed as a given name by the Estonian linguist Julius Mägiste for inclusion on the recommended list of names of the Estonian Mother Tongue Society (Emakeele Selts) in 1929.

As of 1 January 2021, 3,192 women in Estonia have the first name Merike, making it the 37th most popular female name in the country. The name is most commonly found in Võru County, where 35.92 per 10,000 inhabitants of the county bear the name. Individuals bearing the name Merike include:

- Merike Aarma (born 1950), choir director and music teacher
- Merike Martinson (born 1940), physician and politician
- Merike Pau (1941–2008), translator
- Merike Rõtova (born 1936), chess player
- Merike Talve (1957–1997), curator, artist and writer
