= Holly King =

Holly King may refer to:

- Holly King (actress) (born 1977), American film actress and TV personality
- Holly King (artist) (born 1957), Canadian artist and photographer
- Holly King (soccer), American professional soccer player
- Holly King and Oak King, personifications of seasonal cycles
