= Kent Tate =

Canadian artist

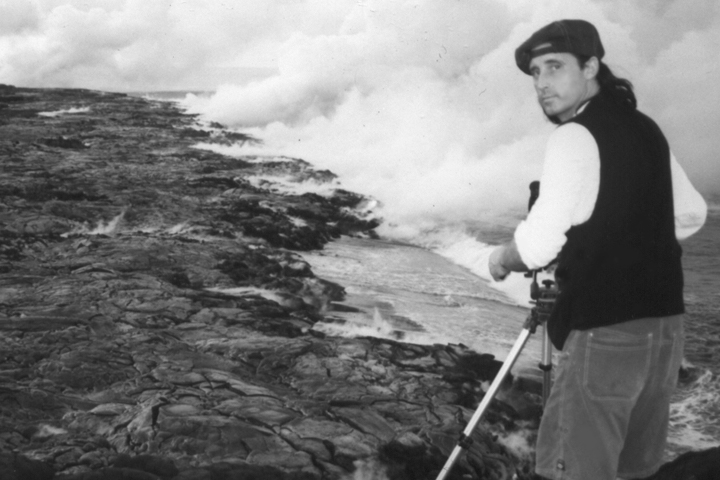
- Kent Tate at lava flows
- Born: Rivers, Manitoba
- Known for: filmmaker
- Website: www.kenttate.ca

Kent Tate is a Canadian artist and filmmaker living in British Columbia. Tate is known for his single-channel video installation works.

== Early life ==
Tate was born in Rivers, Manitoba. He grew up in Germany until he moved with his family to Ottawa, Ontario.

== Exhibitions ==
Tate has exhibited his films and art installations internationally in the UK, USA, Canada, Denmark, Germany, Sweden, Argentina, New Zealand, Mexico and Korea since the early 1980s.

In 1982, Jennifer Oille reviewed Tate's A.R.C. satellite installation in Toronto, the Museum of Post-Habitation, in Vanguard, describing Tate's conversion of a soon to be abandoned dwelling into a museum. The exhibition ended with Tate's performance, Ending All Occupation.

In 1985, the Helen Pitt Gallery in Vancouver presented Tate's exhibition No Rest for the Restless.

In 1986, he presented the installation The Chemical Chamber at the Western Front artist-run centre in Vancouver. Archival material related to the exhibition is held in the Western Front Fonds at the University of British Columbia's Rare Books and Special Collections.

In 1988, Tate exhibited The Stalker installation at the Contemporary Art Gallery in Vancouver.

In 2012, Tate exhibited Movies for a Pulsing Earth, a ten-year retrospective video/sculptural installation at the Art Gallery of Swift Current.

In 2014 Tate's experimental film, The Sun comes out at Night, was an official selection in CURRENTS which is an annual citywide event produced by Parallel Studios in Santa Fe, USA.

In 2016 Tate's video/sculptural installation Movies for a Pulsing Earth toured to the Moose Jaw Museum and Gallery in Moose Jaw, Canada.

In 2019, Curator Kim Houghtaling presented Tate's solo exhibition Peneplain at the Art Gallery of Swift Current in Saskatchewan, Canada Tate's film Catalyst was showcased the same year in the Canadian Filmmakers Distribution Centre and Vtape: Canadian Perspectives on Experimental Film and Video Art program at Kasseler Dokfest in Kasseler, Germany.

In 2020 his film Catalyst was exhibited in The Time is Love exhibition TIME is Love Screening – 12th edition “Universal Feelings: Myths & Conjunction” curated by Kisito Assangni at the Blue Oyster Art Project Space in Dunedin, New Zealand.

In 2021 Tate's film Furnace was an official selection in the Nature & Culture – International Poetry Film Festival presented by the Poetic Phonotheque in Copenhagen, Denmark.

In 2022 the book “Kent Tate: Selected Films 2010 - 2022” with an essay by Julie Oakes was published. Also in that year, The Korean Society of Media & Arts (KOSMA) invited Tate to present the World Premiere of Radius in the KOSMA International Exhibition 'Real is Unreal' which accompanied the 2022 Autumn Symposium “the reconstruction of a relationship” at the Pier Contemporary in Seoul, Korea.

In 2023 Tate exhibited his video Focal Point in the KOSMA Spring International Invitational Exhibition <Floating City> on the Seoullo Media Canvas in Seoul, Korea. Catalyst was screened in Live Soundtrack #69 at the Hypnos Theatre in Malmö, Sweden. His film ARK was an official selection at the Dawson City International Short Film Festival. Curator Jorge Cappelloni presented a retrospective selection of Tate's experimental films covering 2016-2022 which included Inventory (2016), Velocity and Utopia (2017), Catalyst and Rupture (2018), Cornucopia and Furnace (2019), Pressure & Release (2020), Spark (2021) and Radius (2022) at the Buenos Aires Provincial Museum of Contemporary art MAR - Mar del Plata, Argentina.

In 2024, his films Vanishing Heat and ARK were presented in the 22°Festival International Signes de Nuit in Paris, France. ARK was also screened in the 9. Internationales Festival Zeichen der Nacht / Berlin Edition in Berlin, Germany. The work Passengers was premiered in the KOSMA International Exhibition "Fast Forward: Skip" at the Art Museum, 2F, Da Vinci Hall at Seoul National University of Science and Technology in Seoul, Korea. ARK was presented in the Muestra Internacional program of the XI International Exhibition of Video Art and Experimental Cinema at the University of Antioquia in Medellín, Colombia.

In 2025 Tate’s film Precipice was screened at the Thai Film Archive in the 11th International Festival Signs of the Night in Bangkok, Thailand. Symbiosis (silent version) was exhibited by the Korean Society of Media Arts (KOSMA) in the Spring international invitation Exhibition, entitled "The Illusion Beyond the Screen" at the Seoullo Media Canvas in Seoul, Korea. Symbiosis, Precipice, and Trespass were exhibited in Cross Cities Resistance: Time for Peace in their Audio Visual Program "Contemporary Resistance: Examining modern forms of resistance, from art as a tool for change to social and cultural movements “ in Sant'Agata de' Goti, Italy. Passengers, Symbiosis, Precipice and Trespass were also acquired by the CFMDC Collection adding 4 new titles to the 32 other experimental films Tate has in the archive/collection of the Canadian Filmmakers Distribution Centre (CFMDC) in Toronto, Canada.

== Filmography ==
- Sensors 2019
- Carbon Sky 2019
- Furnace 2019
- Cornucopia 2019
- Rupture 2018
- Catalyst 2018
- Velocity 2017
- Utopia 2017
- Inventory 2016
- Isolated gestures 2014
- Prairie Grizzly Talks with Kent 2013
- Radius 2022
- Recollection - Premonition 2021
- Pressure & Release 2021
- Prairie Grizzly's Peneplain 2020
- 10th Frame 2018
- No Rest for the Restless 2017
- Nautilus 2016
- Landing Sites 2015
- Focal Point 2015
- The Sun Comes out at Night 2014
- Transit - Destination 2013
- A Tree Gets in the Way 2013
- Sightings 2013
- Shadows from Magnets 2012
- "Fire & Water" 2012
- Air & Earth 2011
- Burning Farm House 2010
- Prairie Grizzly's Peneplain 2020
- Spark 2021
- Recollection - Premonition" 2021
- Pressure & Release 2021
- Ark 2023
- Vanishing Heat 2024
- AfterMath 2024
- Symbiosis 2025
- Trespass 2025
- Precipice 2025
- Passengers 2025

== Awards ==
- 2015: Ruth Shaw Award (Best of Saskatchewan) from Yorkton Film Festival for Isolated Gestures.
- 2019 "Best Experimental Award" at the Walthamstow International Film Festival for Velocity in London, UK.
- 2025 “Signs Award” for Vanishing Heat from the Internationales Festival Zeichen der Nacht / Berlin, Germany.
