= Cubers =

- Directed by: Richard LeBlanc
- Produced by: Walter Forsyth
- Cinematography: Kyle Cameron
- Distributed by: re:Think Entertainment
- Release date: 2008
- Running time: 70 minutes
- Language: English

Cubers is a documentary film directed by Richard LeBlanc and produced by Walter Forsyth. The documentary's production began in Toronto, Ontario, Canada, but visits Paris, Budapest, Orlando, Tel Aviv, Toulouse and more. The film aired on CBC Newsworld's The Lens in December 2008."Cubers". CBC Newsworld. 25 December 2008.

The documentary appeared in the Orlando Film Festival, Asheville Film Festival, and the Silver Wave Film Festival. The official television premiere was on November 25, 2008, on CBC's Newsworld.

== Plot ==
The documentary follows speedcubers from around the world who can solve the Rubik's Cube in less than 30 seconds through the obstacles of becoming crowned the World Rubik's Cube Champion.

== Press ==
CUBERS especially gained attention in the Maritimes, including Halifax where the documentary held its premiere on September 14, 2008. Before the premiere, director Richard LeBlanc stated that he had not yet solved the Rubik's Cube, despite making an entire film on the subject. Leblanc hoped to solve the puzzle before the premiere.

After a successful premiere at the Atlantic Film Festival, CUBERS was the subject of articles on Yahoo, Metro News, and mentions on Maritime radio.
