= Vickerson =

Vickerson is a surname. Notable people with the surname include:

- Kevin Vickerson (born 1983), American football player
- Laura Vickerson (born 1959), Canadian artist
