= InterAccess =

InterAccess is a Canadian artist-run centre and electronic media production facility in Toronto. The Centre for Contemporary Canadian Art places the founding of InterAccess as a key moment in both the history of Canadian electronic art but also within a timeline of developments in international art, science, technology and culture.

== History ==
In August 1981, Bill Perry and Ric Amis started Telidon at Trinity Square Video, with a Norpak Telidon Information Provider System given to Perry by Bell Canada. Perry, Nina Beveridge and Geoffrey Shea secured operational funding and premises to establish a separate, artist run organization called Toronto Community Videotex (TCV), incorporated in March of 1983. Later in 1983, InterAccess was incorporated as a not-for-profit, artist-run access centre. The founding directors were Perry, Beveridge, Shea and Paul Petro. InterAccess provided artists access to the Telidon system, a precursor of the World Wide Web. The early conception of electronic art placed the organization within the production cooperative system in Canada. TCV's members created artworks which fell within the more systems-based notions of art production, rather than the beaux-arts aesthetic of the museum. The name change to InterAccess in 1987 reflected a new focus on Macintosh graphics, multimedia production and a dial-up artists’ network (much like a Bulletin Board System, or BBS) known as Matrix.

InterAccess moved to a larger facility in 1995 allowing InterAccess to offer a gallery and production space that expanded its activities beyond simply access to multimedia production. The exhibitions began to emphasize the finished production and there was a particular focus on establishing an international presence for the centre. The exhibition Pandoras Box, a collaboration between InterAccess and Fylkingen New Music and Intermedia Art in Stockholm, Sweden in 2000, was billed as "the first international interactive encounter with art using remotely controlled robots."

In 2005, InterAccess moved to a renovated two-floor, three thousand square feet stand-alone building, allowing for more production space, a surround sound studio and a machine shop for constructing large-scale physical computing projects and installation.

The exhibition This must be the place: Vera Frenkel, David Rokeby, Nell Tenhaaf and Norman White was a reconsideration of the centre and the place of electronic art within art history. The four featured artists are described as pioneers in electronic and interactive art and have a history with InterAccess as both members and exhibitors.

In May 2006, InterAccess received a Canada Council Media Arts Commissioning Grant for The Networked City, a series of five outdoor interactive installations on Yonge Street in Toronto.

In Dec 2015, InterAccess announced that it had acquired Vector Festival, a game and new media art festival dedicated to showcasing creative media practices. Vector Festival was founded in 2013 as the “Vector Game Art & New Media Festival” by an independent group of artists and curators: Skot Deeming, Clint Enns, Christine Kim, and Katie Micak, who were later joined by Diana Poulsen and Martin Zeilinger.

In 2016 InterAccess presented Canada's first exhibition related to drones, Once Is Nothing: A Drone Art Exhibition, "an art show completely dedicated to the rise of these suddenly ubiquitous machines, one that raises questions about borders, surveillance, identity and place".

InterAccess moved to 32 Lisgar Street in March 2025. (Unit 4 & 5)
