= Thomas Sherman =

Thomas Sherman may refer to:

== Sports ==
- Tom Sherman (American football) (born 1945), retired NFL quarterback
- Tom Sherman (cricketer) (1825–1911), English cricketer

== Others ==
- Thomas Sherman (MP) for Lewes (UK Parliament constituency)
- Tommy Sherman, fictional character in Daria
- Thomas Ewing Sherman (1856–1933), lawyer and priest
- Thomas W. Sherman (1813–1879), United States Army officer
- Tom Sherman (politician) (born 1957), doctor and New Hampshire state representative
- Tom Sherman (artist) (born 1947), American-Canadian visual and media artist
