= Linda Jansma =

Canadian curator (born 1962)

- Born: 1962 (age 63–64); Bowmanville, Ontario, Canada
- Education: Honours BA in art history from Queen's University, Kingston (1985); MA in art history from University of East Anglia, Norwich, Norfolk (1986)
- Occupation: Art curator
- Known for: curating shows of Canadian modern and contemporary art
- Spouse: Mark Baron

Linda Jansma (born 1962) is the Interim Director of the Robert McLaughlin Gallery in Oshawa (2019–2020) and Senior Curator (1994–2012). She is a Canadian art historian who places collaborative partnerships with institutions across Canada at the centre of her practice.

== Career ==
Linda Jansma was born in Bowmanville and grew up in Hampton, Ontario. She received her Honours BA in Art History from Queen's University, Kingston (1985) and her MA in Art History from the University of East Anglia, Norwich, Norfolk (1986). She served as Registrar/Assistant Curator (1989–1994), Curator (1994–2012), Senior Curator (2012–2018) and Interim Director (2019–2020) of the Robert McLaughlin Gallery in Oshawa, having retired from full-time curatorial practice in 2018.

She focused on Canadian modern art in exhibitions with her show of Canadian artist Michael Forster titled Order out of Chaos: Michael Forster, Sixty Years of a Canadian Artist (1993) and oversaw travel and production of a Kazuo Nakamura show titled Kazuo Nakamura: The Method of Nature (Confederation Centre Art Gallery, Agnes Etherington Art Centre, Art Gallery of Hamilton, Mendel Art Gallery, 2001–2003). She co-curated the exhibition and publication of Jock Macdonald: Evolving Form (Vancouver Art Gallery, Art Gallery of Greater Victoria, 2013–2014) in which she published Macdonald works she discovered done in Vancouver which show his first foray into automatism, held in the Pailthorpe and Mednikoff archives in the Scottish National Gallery of Modern Art Archives. This show was the first major retrospective exhibition of the artist’s work in more than thirty years.

She also curated or co-curated many contemporary Canadian art exhibitions of such Canadian artists as Mary Anne Barkhouse in Mary Anne Barkhouse: Boreal Baroque (Galley Stratford, Art Gallery of Sudbury, Canadian Clay & Glass Gallery, Agnes Jamieson Gallery, Thames Gallery (2007–2008), Holly King in Holly King: Edging Towards the Mysterious (Thames Art Gallery, Musée des beaux-arts de Sherbrooke; Musée du Bas-Saint-Laurent, 2016–2017), Ed Pien, Nell Tenhaaf, and organized a mid-career survey show of artists Jennifer Marman and Daniel Borins, as well writing entries for publications and mentoring emerging curators and writers in Canada.

Besides curating shows, she was involved in commissioning public sculpture by Mary Anne Barkhouse, Douglas Coupland and other sculptors as well as purchases of work by Sarindar Dhaliwal and Tazeen Qayyum. She also has advised the City of Oshawa with its Culture and Art Policy plans.

== Awards ==
- Ontario Association of Art Galleries writing award for "Jock Macdonald, Dr. Grace W. Pailthorpe and Reuben Mednikoff: A Lesson in Automatics". Jock Macdonald: Evolving Form (London: Black Dog Press, 2014)
