= Clive Robertson =

Clive Robertson may refer to:

- Clive Robertson (actor) (born 1965), British actor
- Clive Robertson (artist) (born 1946), British-born Canadian artist
- Clive Robertson (broadcaster) (1945–2024), Australian journalist
