= Bourgault =

Bourgault (French pronunciation: [buʁɡo]); is a predominantly Breton surname derived from Old French but ultimately of Germanic French origin. "Bourg" is from the Frankish *burg meaning town, fortress, or castle and "ault" (-aud) from the Frankish *wald meaning power, mastery, or rule. Philologically, a plurality of Frankish (Franconian) words with the phoneme "w" were changed to gu/ga/gau while developing into nascent old French (e.g. Frankish *werra "war"= "guerre" in Old French, *want "gauntlet"= "gant", and *walha "foreigner/Celt"= "gaulois"). See: Gauthier. Thus, the name means roughly "master of fortification," indicating a position along the lines of a castellan or burgrave. The toponymic "gau" may be significant by dint of the historiographical connotations of the name's meaning. Archaic variants and cognates of the name, used then as an occupational given name, are attested to as early as the 6th century and are found in Fredegar's chronicle although the validity of this source, notwithstanding its primary nature, is often called into question. Therein, one Burgoald was a strongman under King Guntram in the area of Chalon.

The name is sequestered mostly in Brittany, the Pays de la Loire, and Lower Normandy though it is relatively more common in the New World. Seventeenth and eighteenth century census data and baptismal registers indicated a presence in St-Malo and its environs. St-Malo was the chief port of departure for French colonial efforts westward, so it is no great surprise that carriers of the name were among those that emigrated during the kingdom of France's zenith of inhabiting New France. In North America the name is most prevalent in Quebec and, following the late 19th century exodus, New England, particularly Maine and Massachusetts.

The first Bourgault known to emigrate to New France from St-Malo was Jean Bourgault in 1733. He was from Pleurtuit, France, and married Therese Francoise Behier in St-Malo on January 26, 1719. They settled in St-Jean-Port-Joli, Quebec, Canada.

Individuals not within the realm of a recognized heraldic body are entitled to display the following arms and difference them as they see fit: Of azure with two tours argent crenellated on a terrace base of sable.

The name Bourgault is cognate with the feminine Old English Walburga, which in itself means "rule of fortress." Its cognate in Old Norse and the modern Scandinavian languages is Borgvald, commonly used as a forename, surname, and patronymic.

It may also refer to:

- Hélène Bourgault (1945–2006) — Canadian video and film artist
- Jonathan Beaulieu-Bourgault (born 1988) — Canadian professional soccer player
- Lise Bourgault (born 1950) — Canadian politician
- Louis-Albert Bourgault-Ducoudray (1840–1910) — French composer, pianist, and professor of music history/theory
- Pierre Bourgault (1934–2003) — Quebecer politician and essayist
