= Clive Robertson (artist) =

Canadian artist and history professor

PhD. Clive Robertson
- Born: 1946 (age 79–80); Plymouth, Devon, England
- Education: University of Reading
- Occupations: Artist, critic, curator, publisher
- Notable work: Air-To-Earth Parachute Jump (1971), The Sculptured Politics of Joseph Beuys (1975), Explaining Pictures To Dead Air (1978), The Ganser Syndrome (with Johanna Householder and Frances Leeming) (1987)
- Honours: 2015 Lifetime Achievement Award, ARCCO (Artist Run Centres And Collectives, Ontario) 2014 Éminence Gris Award 7a*11d International Performance Art Festival 2002 Nominated for a Governor-General's Visual and Media Arts Award 1996–98 Doctoral Fellowship, SSHRC 1986–87 "A" Grant, Performance Art, The Canada Council 1983–84 "A" Grant, Intermedia, The Canada Council

Clive Robertson (born 1946) is a Canadian performance and media artist, critic, curator, publisher and retired Queen's University art history professor. He is based in Kingston, Ontario.

== Life ==
Clive Robertson immigrated to Canada in 1957, settling in Traynor, Saskatchewan and in 1971 moved to Calgary, Alberta. He is a son of RAF pilot, actor, and Canadian educational TV pioneer Alan Robertson. Robertson attended Plymouth, Cardiff and Liverpool Colleges of Art in the UK before obtaining an MFA in Sculpture/Performance Studies at the University of Reading, England in 1971. He holds a PhD in Communication Studies from Concordia University, Montréal with a dissertation on artist-run culture as a movement and apparatus. Robertson has been recognised as a force for artist organisation advocacy and served in the 1970s as President and in the late 1980s as National Spokesperson for ANNPAC/RACA (Association of National non-profit Artist Centres). Following a Contemporary Art Research Fellowship at the National Gallery of Canada in 1994, Robertson received a full-time appointment to teach contemporary art history at Queen's University in 1999 where he also helped inaugurate the graduate programme in cultural studies. As a critic he has published in: artscanada; Art and Artists; Centerfold; FILE; La Mamelle; Parachute; Only Paper Today; FUSE; C Magazine; Our Times; Remote Control; Parallelogramme; Inter; and High Performance. He retired from teaching in 2016. Clive Robertson's life partner is artist and filmmaker Frances Leeming.

== Curation and publishing ==
Robertson began curating performance art and experimental musics in 1970 in Reading, England programming works by Stuart Marshall, Keith Wood, the Scratch Orchestra and the Portsmouth Sinfonia.

With the artist and educator, Paul Woodrow, Robertson initiated the international performance art collective, W.O.R.K.S. (We.Ourselves.Roughly. Know.Something) in Calgary producing: The First World Festival of W.O.R.K.S. (1972); the artist television series, Conceptographic Reading of Our World Thermometer (1973); and the community cable satire program, Live Lice (1974). Robertson started the audio art magazine, Voicespondence in 1974 as a W.O.R.K.S. project.

With Don Mabie and Marcella Bienvenue, Robertson directed the Parachute Center for Cultural Affairs (later Arton's Publishing) a Calgary artist-run centre famous for its interdisciplinary focus including the production of the magazine, Centerfold (1976–80); Robert Filliou's videotape, Porta Filliou (1977) and a national video art festival, The Canadian Open (1978,1979).

In 1978, Robertson and Bienvenue moved Arton's Publishing to Toronto where with media artists Lisa Steele and Tom Sherman, Robertson became a founding publisher and editor of FUSE, the art/media/politics magazine (1980–2014)

In 1978 Voicespondence began publishing as an indy label where Robertson produced or co-produced first vinyl releases by The Government (1978), Clive Robertson (1981,1985), Gayap Rhythm Drummers (1982), the Dub Poets – Lillian Allen, Clifton Joseph, Devon Haughton (1983), Fifth Column (1983), and the Plasterscene Replicas (1984).

In the 1980s through to the 2000s Clive Robertson also curated projects for A Space, Toronto; Trinity Square Video, Toronto; SAW Gallery, Ottawa; Oboro, Montréal; Centre d'exhibition d'Amos, Québec; Modern Fuel and the Agnes Etherington Art Centre, Kingston; and M:ST (Mountain Standard Time Festival) in Calgary

In 2006 with Modern Fuel curator, Jenn Snider, Robertson co-organized a touring archival retrospective exhibition of his individual and collaborative projects, Then + Then Again – Practices Within An Artist-Run Culture 1969–2005. Between 2007 and 2012 Then +Then Again was shown in Kingston, Quebec City, St.Catherines, Peterborough, London, Toronto, Windsor, Ottawa, Calgary and Saskatoon.

== Selected works ==
Clive Robertson's audio, installation, video, sculpture and performance works have been seen, heard and/or collected in many countries including England, Wales, Canada, U.S., Germany, Poland, France, Holland, Japan and Australia.

Performances include: 12,13,8,11 (1970); Air-To-Earth Parachute Jump (1971); Conversation Piece (at Corrugated Cardboard Products Ltd) (1971); A Year of..F (with Sue Clancy) (1972–73); The Sculptured Politics of Joseph Beuys (1975); In Video Traction (with Marcella Bienvenue) (1976); Explaining Pictures To Dead Air (1978); The Intervenors (with Janet Martin) (1982); In A Drunken Stupor (1983); The Ganser Syndrome (with Johanna Householder and Frances Leeming) (1987); The Sinking of The Gigantic (with Frances Leeming); Taschibosen – The Bridge (1991); Turning the Page (2002); The Confessional Archive Toolshed (2000); The Butler and The Secretary (with Germaine Koh) (2003); The Award (2014); and Flagging Peace (with Ciara Phillips) (2016).

Videoworks include: A Subtle Shade of Violets (1976); Lunar Re-Appraisal (1979); Speaking of Our Culture (1982); What Can A Man Say? (1983–86); Up To Scratch (with Craig Condy-Berggold) (1988); Trade Winds Canada Ltd (1994); A Grandmother and a Godfather: Kit Fahey and Joseph Beuys (2004); Il a cessé de l'aimer l'art aujourdhui (grace å George Jones) (2013); and I.O.60s (In Our Sixties) (2010–15).

Audio and Music Albums include: Space Perception and Construction (1969); Family Music (1972); The Wreckin Role History of Art (1974); Popular songs (1981); Warfare versus Welfare (1985); and Isle of Retirement (2012).

== Awards ==
1983-4 "A" Grant, Intermedia, The Canada Council

1986-7 "A" Grant, Performance Art, The Canada Council

1996-8 Doctoral Fellowship, SSHRC

2002 Nominated for a Governor-General's Visual and Media Arts Award

2014 Éminence Gris Award 7a*11d International Performance Art Festival

2015 Lifetime Achievement Award, ARCCO (Artist Run Centres And Collectives, Ontario)

== Publications ==
Conceptographic Reading Of Our World Thermometer (1973), with Paul Woodrow, W.O.R.K.S., Calgary.

w.o.r.k.s.c.o.r.e.p.o.r.t. (1975), Beau Geste Press, Cullompton, England. ISBN 0859980170

Video By Artists (1976), W.O.R.K.S. in Peggy Gale, Art Metropole, Toronto, ISBN 0920956203

Performance By Artists (1979), Clive Robertson in AA Bronson and Peggy Gale, Art Metropole, Toronto. ISBN 0920956009

Performance Au/In Canada, 1970–1990 (1991), with Alain-Martin Richard, Éditions Intervention and Coach House Press. ISBN 292050004X

Policy Matters – Administrations of Art And Culture (2006), Clive Robertson, YYZ Books, Toronto. ISBN 0920397360

"Then + Then Again: Talking with Clive Robertson about Artist-Run Culture,", Vera Frenkel, FUSE, Vol 30 #3, 26–37, July 2007

Clive Robertson, A W.O.R.K.S. Sampler (2016), with Judit Bodor, Gordian Projects, Glasgow-Sheffield-York, U.K.
