= James B. Steele =

American journalist (born 1943)

- Born: January 3, 1943 (age 83); Hutchinson, Kansas
- Occupations: Investigative journalist, nonfiction writer
- Notable credit(s): The Philadelphia Inquirer, Time, Vanity Fair, books:Empire: The Life, Legend, and Madness of Howard Hughes (with Donald L. Barlett), Forevermore: Nuclear Waste in America (with Donald L. Barlett), America: What Went Wrong?(with Donald L. Barlett), America: Who Really Pays the Taxes? (with Donald L. Barlett), America: Who Stole the Dream (with Donald L. Barlett), The Great American Tax Dodge (with Donald L. Barlett), Critical Condition: How Health Care in America Became Big Business -- and Bad Medicine (with Donald L. Barlett), The Betrayal of the American Dream (with Donald L. Barlett), America: What Went Wrong? The Crisis Deepens (with Donald L. Barlett).
- Spouse: Nancy Steele
- Children: Allison Steele
- Relatives: Lisa Steele (sister)
- Website: http://barlettandsteele.com/

James B. Steele (born January 3, 1943) is an American investigative journalist and author. With longtime collaborator Donald L. Barlett, he has won two Pulitzer Prizes, two National Magazine Awards, six George Polk Awards and many other national awards during the more than 40 years they worked together at The Philadelphia Inquirer, Time, and Vanity Fair.

== Biography ==
Steele was born in Hutchinson, Kansas, and was raised in Kansas City, Missouri. He graduated from the University of Missouri–Kansas City and began his career at the Kansas City Times, where he covered politics, labor and urban affairs. In 1970 he joined The Philadelphia Inquirer, where his partnership with Barlett began.

Barlett and Steele were the longest-running investigative reporting team in American history and the co-authors of nine books, including two New York Times bestsellers.

The duo's reporting methods included extensive use of government documents and computers to analyze complex public issues. The Washington Journalism Revue in 1990 described them as "almost certainly the best team in the history of investigative reporting."

At The Inquirer from 1971 to 1997, Barlett and Steele tackled a wide range of subjects, including The Internal Revenue Service, the oil industry, American foreign aid, federal housing programs, criminal justice, nuclear waste, hidden tax breaks enacted by Congress, income inequality and the shrinking middle class.

For their series "Auditing the IRS", which documented unequal patterns of tax collection, they were awarded The Pulitzer Prize for National Reporting in 1975. They also received The Pulitzer Prize for National Reporting in 1989 for their series "The Great Tax Giveaway", which disclosed the identities of individuals and corporations that received preferential tax breaks in the Tax Reform Act of 1986.

In 1972, Barlett and Steele, working with Philip Meyer, who pioneered in the field of computer-assisted journalism, used a computer to analyze more than 1,000 cases of violent crime in Philadelphia. "Crime and Injustice" was the largest computer-assisted journalism project of its time.

Their 1991 Inquirer series, "America: What Went Wrong?", on how actions of Wall Street and Washington were undermining the middle class and leading to ever-greater income inequality, was named one of the 100 greatest works of journalism of the 20th century by New York University's School of Journalism. Bill Moyers produced and narrated two one-hour specials based on the series for "Listening to America" on PBS.

In 1997, Barlett and Steele left The Inquirer to become editors-at-large for Time Inc., writing principally for Time magazine.Time won two National Magazine Awards for series by Barlett and Steele: "What Corporate Welfare Costs You" (1998) and "Big Money and Politics: Who Gets Hurt" (2000).

After Time, for financial reasons, declined to renew their contract, Barlett and Steele became contributing editors for Vanity Fair. From 2006 to 2016, they researched and wrote investigative articles on subjects including the strong-arm tactics of Monsanto against America's farmers, the military-industrial-intelligence complex, and the disappearance of billions of dollars in cash the U.S. airlifted to Baghdad at the outset of the Iraqi war.

To encourage the kind of in-depth reporting that Barlett and Steele practiced, the Donald W. Reynolds Foundation in 2006 created the Barlett and Steele Awards administered annually by Arizona State University.

Steele and Barlett are the authors of nine books. Their first, a biography of Howard Hughes, EMPIRE: The Life, Legend and Madness of Howard Hughes (1979), received widespread critical acclaim. The New York Times Sunday Book Review called it "the first fully documented cradle-to-grave account of a unique American life...". Their second book, Forevermore: Nuclear Waste in America (1985), was selected as one of the 100 best science books of 1985 by the Library Journal. America: What Went Wrong?, an expanded version of their Inquirer series, became a number one New York Times bestseller in 1992. America: Who Really Pays the Taxes? (1994), depicts unfairness in the U.S. tax system. America: Who Stole the Dream? (1996), also an expanded edition of the Inquirer series, describes the ravages of U.S. trade policy on American manufacturing. The Great American Tax Dodge (2000) details widespread tax cheating and fraud. Critical Condition: How Health Care in America Became Big Business and Bad Medicine (2004), is an indictment of America's health care system that values profit over health care. The Betrayal of the American Dream, which tells of the ongoing impoverishment of America's middle class, quickly became a New York Times bestseller when published in 2012. Their ninth book, America: What Went Wrong? The Crisis Deepens (2020), is an updated and expanded edition of their 1992 bestseller.

Steele has also written investigative articles on the student loan crisis for Reveal of the Center for Investigative Reporting and on federal tax policies favoring the rich for the Center for Public Integrity.

He is a lecturer at the Klein College of Media and Communication at Temple University, which in 2016 established the James B. Steele Chair in Journalism Innovation. He also has taught at Princeton University as a Ferris Fellow in 2009 and 2015.

Steele has led reporting seminars at many universities and news organizations, including the Global Investigative Journalism Network and the Norwegian Foundation for Investigative Reporting (SKUP). He has spoken at conferences of Investigative Reporters and Editors (IRE), the premier U.S. organization of investigative journalists, since its founding in 1976.

Steele is also a director of the Fund for Investigative Journalism, which supports the work of independent journalists.

Steele is married to Nancy Steele, an editor, and they have a daughter, Allison Steele.

His sister, Lisa Steele, is a video artist and professor emeritus of art at the University of Toronto.

== Published works ==
=== Books ===
- Barlett, Donald L.; Steele, James B. (1979). Empire: The Life, Legend, and Madness of Howard Hughes. W.W. Norton & Company. ISBN 0-393-00025-7.
- Barlett, Donald L.; Steele, James B. (1985). Forevermore: Nuclear Waste in America. W.W. Norton & Company. ISBN 0-393-01920-9.
- Barlett, Donald L.; Steele, James B. (1992). America: What Went Wrong?. Andrews and McMeel. ISBN 0-8362-7001-0.
- Barlett, Donald L.; Steele, James B. (1994). America: Who Really Pays the Taxes?. Simon & Schuster. ISBN 0-671-87157-9.
- Barlett, Donald L.; Steele, James B. (1996). America: Who Stole the Dream?. Andrews and McMeel. ISBN 0-8362-1314-9.
- Barlett, Donald L.; Steele, James B. (2000). The Great American Tax Dodge: How Spiraling Fraud and Avoidance are Killing Fairness, Destroying the Income Tax, And Costing You. Little, Brown and Company. ISBN 0-316-81135-1.
- Barlett, Donald L.; Steele, James B. (2004). Critical Condition: How Health Care in America Became Big Business — and Bad Medicine. Doubleday. ISBN 0-385-50454-3.
- Barlett, Donald L.; Steele, James B. (2012). The Betrayal of the American Dream. Public Affairs. ISBN 978-161-0393201.
- Barlett, Donald L.; Steele, James B. (2020). America: What Went Wrong? The Crisis Deepens. Mission Point Press. ISBN 978-1-950659-50-0.

== Newspaper articles ==
- Barlett, Donald L.; Steele, James B. (April 10, 1988). "How the Influential win Billions in Special Tax Breaks". The Philadelphia Inquirer. p. A01.
- Barlett, Donald L.; Steele, James B. (April 10, 1988). "The Tax Chairmen Fail to Respond to Queries". The Philadelphia Inquirer. p. A14.
- Barlett, Donald L.; Steele, James B. (April 10, 1988). "A Rich Texas Widow Could Save $4 Million". The Philadelphia Inquirer. p. A15.
- Barlett, Donald L.; Steele, James B. (April 11, 1988). "A Millionaire Businessman and his Island Tax Shelter". The Philadelphia Inquirer. p. A01.
- Barlett, Donald L.; Steele, James B. (April 11, 1988). "A Tax Favor for Backer of Conservative Causes". The Philadelphia Inquirer. p. A07.
- Barlett, Donald L.; Steele, James B. (April 12, 1988). "How Businesses Influence the Tax-Writing Process". The Philadelphia Inquirer. p. A01.
- Barlett, Donald L.; Steele, James B. (April 13, 1988). "Disguising Those who get Tax Breaks". The Philadelphia Inquirer. p. A01.
- Barlett, Donald L.; Steele, James B. (April 13, 1988). "Investors take over a Vital Atomic Plant a Tax-Saving Strategy Develops". The Philadelphia Inquirer. p. A10.
- Barlett, Donald L.; Steele, James B. (April 14, 1988). "Congress can't add, so the Taxpayer pays". The Philadelphia Inquirer. p. A01.
- Barlett, Donald L.; Steele, James B. (April 14, 1988). "The Wall Street star who Started Catalyst Energy". The Philadelphia Inquirer. p. A18.
- Barlett, Donald L.; Steele, James B. (April 14, 1988). "A $4 Billion Price Tag to Stop a Nuclear Plant". The Philadelphia Inquirer. p. A19.
- Barlett, Donald L.; Steele, James B. (April 15, 1988). "One Firm's Huge Break". The Philadelphia Inquirer. p. A01.
- Barlett, Donald L.; Steele, James B. (April 16, 1988). "Cruising, at Taxpayers' Expense". The Philadelphia Inquirer. p. A01.
- Barlett, Donald L.; Steele, James B. (April 16, 1988). "A Big Bailouts for Steel Firms with the Assistance of Heinz". The Philadelphia Inquirer. p. A07.
- Barlett, Donald L.; Steele, James B. (September 25, 1988). "The Tax-Break Sweepstakes". The Philadelphia Inquirer. p. A01.
- Barlett, Donald L.; Steele, James B. (September 25, 1988). "The Tax War Between the Chickens and the Pigs". The Philadelphia Inquirer. p. A17.
- Barlett, Donald L.; Steele, James B. (September 26, 1988). "Family Football Seeks Bonus Through Tax Bill". The Philadelphia Inquirer. p. A01.
- Barlett, Donald L.; Steele, James B. (September 26, 1988). "A Historic Hotel and its Quest for a Tax Cut". The Philadelphia Inquirer. p. A01.
- Barlett, Donald L.; Steele, James B. (November 4, 1990). "A Tax Increase for the Rich that's no Increase at all". The Philadelphia Inquirer. p. A01.

=== "America: What Went Wrong?" ===
- Barlett, Donald L.; Steele, James B. (October 20, 1991). "How the Game was Rigged Against the Middle Class". The Philadelphia Inquirer. p. A01.
- Barlett, Donald L.; Steele, James B. (October 20, 1991). "Who -- and how many -- in America's Middle Class". The Philadelphia Inquirer. p. A16.
- Barlett, Donald L.; Steele, James B. (October 20, 1991). "After 3 Decades, American Worker Loses out to Mexico". The Philadelphia Inquirer. p. A17.
- Barlett, Donald L.; Steele, James B. (October 21, 1991). "The Lucrative Business of Bankruptcy". The Philadelphia Inquirer. p. A01.
- Barlett, Donald L.; Steele, James B. (October 22, 1991). "Big Business Hits that Jackpot with Billions in Tax Breaks". The Philadelphia Inquirer. p. A01.
- Barlett, Donald L.; Steele, James B. (October 23, 1991). "Why the World is Closing in on U.S. Economy". The Philadelphia Inquirer. p. A01.
- Barlett, Donald L.; Steele, James B. (October 24, 1991). "The High Cost of Deregulation". The Philadelphia Inquirer. p. A01.
- Barlett, Donald L.; Steele, James B. (October 25, 1991). "For Millions in U.S., a Harsh Reality". The Philadelphia Inquirer. p. A01.
- Barlett, Donald L.; Steele, James B. (October 25, 1991). "How Death came to a Once-Prosperous Discount-Store Chain". The Philadelphia Inquirer. p. A21.
- Barlett, Donald L.; Steele, James B. (October 26, 1991). "Raiders work their Wizardry on an All-American Company". The Philadelphia Inquirer. p. A01.
- Barlett, Donald L.; Steele, James B. (October 27, 1991). "When you Retire, Will There be a Pension Waiting?". The Philadelphia Inquirer. p. A01.
- Barlett, Donald L.; Steele, James B. (October 27, 1991). "Workers Saving for Their Retirement Lose on Junk Bonds". The Philadelphia Inquirer. p. A17.
- Barlett, Donald L.; Steele, James B. (October 28, 1991). "How Special Interest Groups have their way with Washington". The Philadelphia Inquirer. p. A01.
- Barlett, Donald L.; Steele, James B. (February 2, 1992). "The Politics of Tax Breaks in an Election Year". The Philadelphia Inquirer. p. A01.

=== "America: Who Stole the Dream?" ===
- Barlett, Donald L.; Steele, James B. (September 8, 1996). "How U.S. Policies are Costing America Jobs". The Philadelphia Inquirer. p. A01.
- Barlett, Donald L.; Steele, James B. (September 8, 1996). "Why the Series Came to be". The Philadelphia Inquirer. p. A18.
- Barlett, Donald L.; Steele, James B. (September 9, 1996). "Importing Goods, Exporting Jobs". The Philadelphia Inquirer. p. A01.
- Barlett, Donald L.; Steele, James B. (September 10, 1996). "Endangered Label: Made in the USA". The Philadelphia Inquirer. p. A01.
- Barlett, Donald L.; Steele, James B. (September 11, 1996). "The "New" American Worker". The Philadelphia Inquirer. p. A01.
- Barlett, Donald L.; Steele, James B. (September 12, 1996). "The Burden of the Working Woman". The Philadelphia Inquirer. p. A01.
- Barlett, Donald L.; Steele, James B. (September 15, 1996). "Shortcut to U.S. Jobs". The Philadelphia Inquirer. p. A01.
- Barlett, Donald L.; Steele, James B. (September 16, 1996). "Say Goodbye to High-Tech Jobs". The Philadelphia Inquirer. p. A01.
- Barlett, Donald L.; Steele, James B. (September 17, 1996). "The Lobbying Game: Influence-Brokers in D.C.". The Philadelphia Inquirer. p. A01.
- Barlett, Donald L.; Steele, James B. (September 18, 1996). "One American Industry that Thrives: Retraining". The Philadelphia Inquirer. p. A01.
- Barlett, Donald L.; Steele, James B. (September 22, 1996). "A Nation in Search of Answers". The Philadelphia Inquirer. p. A01.

=== Magazine articles ===
- Barlett, Donald L.; Steele, James B. (November 9, 1998). "States at War". Time. Archived from the original on January 12, 2005.
- Barlett, Donald L.; Steele, James B. (November 9, 1998). "Corporate Welfare". Time. Archived from the original on February 14, 2008.
- Barlett, Donald L.; Steele, James B. (November 16, 1998). "Fantasy Islands". Time. Archived from the original on June 4, 2008.
- Barlett, Donald L.; Steele, James B. (November 23, 1998). "Sweet Deal". Time. Archived from the original on June 4, 2008.
- Barlett, Donald L.; Steele, James B. (November 23, 1998). "Paying a Price for Polluters". Time. Archived from the original on June 4, 2008.
- Barlett, Donald L.; Steele, James B. (November 30, 1998). "The Empire of the Pigs". Time. Archived from the original on October 23, 2006.
- Barlett, Donald L.; Steele, James B. (November 30, 1998). "Five Ways Out". Time. Archived from the original on March 7, 2008.
- Barlett, Donald L.; Steele, James B. (February 7, 2000). "How the Little Guy Gets Crunched". Time. Archived from the original on November 16, 2005.
- Barlett, Donald L.; Steele, James B. (February 7, 2000). "How to Become a Top Banana". Time. Archived from the original on February 11, 2001.
- Barlett, Donald L.; Steele, James B. (May 15, 2000). "Soaked By Congress". Time. Archived from the original on February 11, 2001.
- Barlett, Donald L.; Steele, James B. (September 25, 2000). "Throwing the Game". Time. Archived from the original on June 11, 2001.
- Barlett, Donald L.; Steele, James B. (December 16, 2002). "Who Gets the Money?". Time. Archived from the original on June 4, 2008.
- Barlett, Donald L.; Steele, James B. (December 16, 2002). "Wheel of Misfortune". Time. Archived from the original on June 4, 2008.
- Barlett, Donald L.; Steele, James B. (December 23, 2002). "Playing the Political Slots". Time. Archived from the original on January 23, 2005.
- Barlett, Donald L.; Steele, James B. (February 3, 2003). "The Really Unfair Tax". Time. Archived from the original on October 26, 2004.
- Barlett, Donald L.; Steele, James B. (May 19, 2003). "The Oily Americans". Time. Archived from the original on March 9, 2005.
- Barlett, Donald L.; Steele, James B. (May 19, 2003). "Iraq's Crude Awakening". Time. Archived from the original on May 20, 2005.
- Barlett, Donald L.; Steele, James B. (July 21, 2003). "The U.S. is Running Out of Energy". Time. Archived from the original on December 31, 2006.
- Barlett, Donald L.; Steele, James B. (October 13, 2003). "The Great Energy Scam". Time. Archived from the original on October 26, 2004.
- Barlett, Donald L.; Steele, James B. (October 13, 2003). "Asleep at the Switch". Time. Archived from the original on September 30, 2007.
- Barlett, Donald L.; Steele, James B. (February 2, 2004). "Why We Pay So Much for Drugs". Time. Archived from the original on November 15, 2006.
- Barlett, Donald L.; Steele, James B. (February 2, 2004). "Has Your Life Become Too Much a Game of Chance?". Time. Archived from the original on June 4, 2008.
- Barlett, Donald L.; Steele, James B. (September 20, 2004). "Who Left the Door Open?". Time. Archived from the original on June 4, 2008.
- Barlett, Donald L.; Steele, James B. (October 23, 2005). "The Broken Promise". Time. Archived from the original on October 24, 2005.
- Barlett, Donald L.; Steele, James B. (October 31, 2005). "Where Pensions are Golden". Time. Archived from the original on October 25, 2005.
- Barlett, Donald L.; Steele, James B. (March 2007). "Washington's $8 Billion Shadow". Vanity Fair.
- Barlett, Donald L.; Steele, James B. (October 2007). "Billions Over Baghdad". Vanity Fair.
- Barlett, Donald L.; Steele, James B. (May 2008). "Monsanto's Harvest of Fear". Vanity Fair.
- Barlett, Donald L.; Steele, James B. (October 2009). "Good Billions After Bad". Vanity Fair.
- Barlett, Donald L.; Steele, James B. (January 2011). "Deadly Medicine". Vanity Fair.
- Steele, James B. (December 2015). "The Disturbing Truth on How Airplanes Are Maintained Today". Vanity Fair.

=== Other articles ===
- Steele, James B.; Williams, Lance (June 28, 2016). "Who Got Rich Off the Student Debt Crisis". Reveal from the Center for Investigative Reporting.
- Steele, James B. (November 29, 2022). "How Four Decades of Tax Cuts Fueled Inequality". Center for Public Integrity.
