= Elizabeth Vander Zaag =

Canadian artist

- Born: 1952 (age 73–74); Alliston, Ontario, Canada
- Education: University of Western Ontario (BFA); University of British Columbia (MA)
- Known for: New Media artist, video artist

Elizabeth Vander Zaag (born 21 June 1952) is a Canadian media artist, writer, and entrepreneur who has been working in video and computer arts since the 1970s. She is based in Vancouver, British Columbia.

Vander Zaag is considered a pioneer of digital media. Her work has been exhibited internationally and included in exhibitions such as c.1983 that examine the history of video art.

== Early life and education ==
Elizabeth Vander Zaag was born in Alliston, Ontario in 1952. She received a Bachelor of Arts degree in English and film from the University of Western Ontario. She also studied creative electronics at Fanshawe College in London, Ontario. After moving to Vancouver, British Columbia in 1974, Vander Zaag briefly studied computer arts at Simon Fraser University in nearby Burnaby, British Columbia.

In 2007, she received her master's degree in interdisciplinary studies from the University of British Columbia. Her graduate thesis, Mother Tongue : a study of participant affect in an interactive installation, combines research in linguistics and human–computer interaction to further her understanding of the academic context of her interactive speech installations. Along with her graduate thesis, Vander Zaag produced an interactive video installation entitled Speaking Mother Tongues (2007).

== Career ==
Between 1977 and 1980, Vander Zaag created the Digit Series, a videotape series that was featured on the cable television program The Gina Show by producer John Anderson. The Digit Series explored both gender and technology. The Digit Series has been included in exhibitions such as the International Symposium on Electronic Art in 2015.

In 1981 Elizabeth Vander Zaag produced Thru the Holes, a short video in which the fragmentation of the video screen was used as a filter for human presence. This and other video works by Vander Zaag from the 1980-1990s are distributed by Video Out and V/Tape. Thru the Holes has been included in a number of retrospective exhibitions.

SyntheticSound: An Experimental Music/Video Retrospective (2016) examined experimental video and music from the 1970s onward. It was curated by Alan Kollins for the transmediale/CTM Vorspiel festival in 2016 and screened in both Canada and Germany. Vander Zaag's work is included to illustrate experimentation with video processing occurring in the 1980s.

c.1983 (2012) examined the development of video art, and the ways in which artists such as Vander Zaag "critiqued the commodification of the art object through the expansion of the powers and capacities of the photographic image."

Vander Zaag's work Hot Chicks on TV (1986) was included in the exhibition Rebel Girls: A Survey of Canadian Feminist Videotapes 1974-1988, curated by Susan Ditta at the National Gallery of Canada in 1989. There it was discussed in the context of women's history, representations of the female body, and relationship of the personal to the political.

In 2000, Elizabeth Vander Zaag's voice interactive installation Talk Nice appeared at the Banff Centre before traveling in Canada and to Seoul, Korea, Sao Paulo, Brazil and Paris.

In 2011, Vander Zaag became the CEO of Mermaid Power Corporation. Mermaid Power has since merged with Neptune Wave, where Vander Zaag is now the CFO. She has also managed companies such as Front Media Ltd, CougarDate.com, Ross House Holdings Ltd. She is the director of North Arm Holdings Ltd.

== Collections ==
Elizabeth Vander Zaag's work is in the following museum collections:

- National Gallery of Canada
- Art Gallery of Ontario
- Vancouver Art Gallery
- Morris and Helen Belkin Art Gallery
- Museum of Modern Art (MoMA)
