= Jacqueline Hoang Nguyen =

Canadian-born artist

Jacqueline Hoàng Nguyễn (born 1979, Montreal, Quebec) is a Canadian-born artist currently living in Stockholm, Sweden. Her art practice is primarily research-based and often takes the form of installation, video, photographs and audio. She received her BFA from Concordia University (2003), her post-graduate diploma in Critical Studies from the Malmö Art Academy (2005) and is a graduate of the Whitney Independent Study Program.

== Themes ==
Some of the themes that surface in Nguyen's work include resistance, power, and feminism. Many of her projects look at how histories are recorded within archival records and reclaim narratives of activism and citizen-led solidarity networks. As such, her work often creates new archives or explores existing archives, including Making of an Archive which explores the everyday of immigrants to Canada and looking at the work of Olive Morris, as a member of the Remembering Olive Collective (ROC).

== Works ==
In her 25-channel sound installation For An Epidemic Resistance (2009), Nguyen explores a laughing epidemic which took place in 1962 in Tanganyika. In an article which appeared in Fuse Magazine in 2013, Amber Berson wrote that "the outbreak of laughter [...] lasted for six months and first occurred at a mission-run boarding school for [...] we can choose to read the girls' laughter as a form of resistance against their patriarchal society and the colonizers at their mission-run institution [...] Yet the girls' weapon – laughter – eventually shut down the school (and other institutions), proving it an effective means of resistance, which Nguyen celebrates in her piece."

Another work, Space Fiction & the Archives (2012), deals with the Canadian centennial celebrations of 1967 and the incident of a Martian landing pad created to welcome UFOs to St. Paul, Alberta. Nguyen "posits a relationship between science fiction and multiculturalism." Her work is highly researched, but also involves an element of storytelling.

Nguyễn's project, The Wages Dues Song (2016) takes up the work of The Wages Dues Collective, a feminist collective formed in 1974 in Toronto, Ontario, Canada, which was linked to the Wages for housework movement in the US. The work appeared as part of the recent exhibition The Let Down Reflex, which ran from January 30 – March 12, 2016 at EFA Project Space in New York.

Jacqueline Hoàng Nguyễn's work has been exhibited at The New Gallery, MAI (Montréal, arts interculturels), Momenta Art, Kunstverein Braunschweig, VOX: Centre de l’image contemporaine, the MTL BNL, A Space, Apexart, PAVED Arts, Or Gallery, and the Philadelphia Institute of Contemporary Art.

In addition to her work as an artist, Nguyen is also a curator, a writer, and an educator. Her work is included in several public and private collections in Canada, Sweden, and the United States, including the NARS Foundation (Brooklyn, US).

Nguyễn's project The Making of an Archive was initiated in 2014 at Gendai Gallery, in Toronto, with curator Maiko Tanaka. The Making of an Archive is a grassroots archival project aimed at capturing images of everyday life of the immigrant experience in Canada. The project involved digitization workshops where the artist invited immigrants and their families, who identify as persons of colour, to scan their photographs and ephemera. The project continued in 2017 at grunt gallery in Vancouver. Although the project is described as ongoing, a publication dedicated to the project was published by grunt gallery in 2018.

== Honours ==
- Production Programme, Sharjah Art Foundation, 2016
- Sobey Art Award, Longlist, 2015
- The Swedish Arts Grants Committee International Program for Visual Arts, International Exhibition Grant, 2013
