= Tom Sherman (artist) =

American sculptor (born 1947)

Tom Sherman (born August 5, 1947) is an American-Canadian artist working in video, audio, radio, performance, sculpture and text/image. He is also a writer of nonfiction and fiction. He is a recipient of Canada's Governor General's Awards in Visual and Media Arts. He is a professor of video art at Syracuse University.

== Early life ==
Sherman was born in Manistee, Michigan. As a boy he was a committed naturalist, studying and collecting insects with a particular fascination for Lepidoptera (butterflies and moths). His public school education was complemented by his experimentation in amateur radio and electronics (he was licensed as WN8CES), shortwave listening and medium wave DXing. This early involvement with communications technologies evolved into cultural pursuits. He earned a BFA degree from Eastern Michigan University in 1970, majoring in sculpture.

== Work with organizations ==
In 1972 Sherman immigrated to Canada, and later became a Canadian citizen. He settled in Toronto and began working at A Space, one of the first artist-run centres in Canada. He established (with Lisa Steele) a video facility for artists at A Space from 1972 to 1975. Throughout the 1970s he developed and established his practice as a visual and media artist making and showing conceptual text-image works, performance art and video art, and sculptural installations.

During this time, he was also a regular on-air contributor to CBC Radio's Morningside with Peter Gzowski and As It Happens with Barbara Frum. From 1976 to 1978 he directed and edited scores of music videos for Nightmusic, a television talk show on the arts on TVOntario, Toronto. He also curated and produced Afterimage, a 13-week, half-hour program of experimental film and video art on TVOntario. In 1978 he was a researcher and writer for Fast Forward, a TVOntario series on the digital revolution, broadcast extensively on PBS in the USA.

After a brief stint as a visiting professor in 1979–1980 at the Nova Scotia College of Art and Design, in Halifax, he was a founding editor (with Clive Robertson and Lisa Steele) of Fuse Magazine in Toronto. Sherman represented Canada at Venice Biennale in 1980 in "Canada Video," curated by Bruce Ferguson of the National Gallery of Canada, featuring his video art along with video by Lisa Steele, Colin Campbell, General Idea, Pierre Falardeau and Julien Poulin.

In 1981 Sherman moved to Ottawa, taking a position as Video Officer within the Visual Arts Section at The Canada Council. In 1983 he founded the Media Arts Section of The Canada Council, becoming its first Head of Section, and establishing Council's first grant programs for computer-integrated media. That year the National Gallery of Canada mounted "Cultural Engineering", a ten-year survey of his video, installations and writing, curated by Willard Holmes.

In 1986 Sherman was appointed an International Commissioner for the Venice Biennale: Sherman, Don Foresta, Tomasso Trini and Roy Ascott curated a major exhibition of digital, network art called Ubiqua: Art, Technology and Informatics at the 1986 Venice Biennale. In 1988-89 he worked with Simon Fraser University to develop and launch a research institute about digital technologies for the arts, the Centre for Image and Sound Research. In 1991 he was appointed Director of the School of Art at Syracuse University in central New York, USA. He continues to teach in the Department of Transmedia at Syracuse University, specializing in video art production and media art history.

== Art: exhibitions, performance and publishing ==
Sherman's visual and media art has been featured in scores of exhibitions, festivals and broadcast venues, including the Vancouver Art Gallery, Anthology Film Archives, the Whitney Museum of American Art, the Museum of Modern Art (New York), the Art Gallery of Ontario, the Images Festival (Toronto), the National Gallery of Canada, Elektra and the Festival International des Film sur l'Art, Musée d'art contemporain de Montréal, Galerie René Blouin (Montreal), Art Gallery of Nova Scotia, Ars Electronica (Linz), Wiener Konzerthaus (Vienna), Musée d'art moderne de la Ville de Paris, Documenta X and Kasseler Dokfest (Kassel), LUX Cinema and Tate Britain (London), Montevideo (Amsterdam), the Impakt Festival (Utrecht), In Video (Milan), the Museo Nacional Centro de Arte Reina Sofia (Madrid), and Transitio_MX (Mexico City).

Faraday Cage installation, Tom Sherman, A Space, Toronto, 1973

In 1997 he founded Nerve Theory, a recording and performance duo with Viennese musician and composer Bernhard Loibner, and was an on-air contributor to many of radio art programs on Kunstradio, the Austrian Broadcasting Network, and other radio venues internationally from 1997 to 2018.

Sherman began publishing essays and articles in 1972 and has published widely in magazines, print anthologies and web-publications. He has published six monographs, including two anthologies of his texts, Cultural Engineering (edited by Willard Holmes, National Gallery of Canada, Ottawa, 1983) and Before and After the I-Bomb: An Artist in the Information Environment (edited by Peggy Gale, Banff Centre Press, Alberta, 2002).

He has been active in the electronic digital network culture since the early 1980s, actively publishing and interacting on listservs and contemporary social media, including the video file-sharing websites YouTube and Vimeo.

== Books ==
=== As author ===
- 3 Death Stories, Art Metropole (Toronto, Ontario), 1978.
- "Animal Magnetism", Only Paper Today (Toronto, Ontario), Vol. 4, No. 10, 1978.
- "1 Traditional Methodology for Processing Information (under the influence of Brian Molyneaux and Jay Yager)", Metropolitan Toronto Library/Art Gallery of Ontario, June 1978.
- Vocation/Vacation: Banff Information Base (co-authored with Jan Pottie), Banff Centre for the Arts (Banff, Alberta), 1981.
- Cultural Engineering, ed. Willard Holmes, National Gallery of Canada Ottawa, 1983. (ISBN 0-88884-498-0)
- Before and After the I-Bomb: An Artist in the Information Environment, ed. Peggy Gale, Banff Centre Press (Banff, Alberta), 2002.

=== Exhibit catalogues ===
- Ferguson, Bruce. "Tom Sherman", in Canada Video (exhibition catalogue), National Gallery of Canada (Ottawa), 1980, in English, French and Italian, pp. 60–78. (ISBN 0-88884-442-5)
- Blanchette, Manon. "Tom Sherman, Video and Writing (Un aspect différent de la télévision)": Musée d'art contemporain, Montréal, 4 Mars 1982-4 avril 1982 (ISBN 978-2-551-04587-7)
- Cuperman, Pedro. "Tom Sherman: Meditations on Video & Language", Point of Contact Gallery, Syracuse, New York, October 25-November 30, 2012

== Awards ==
- Bell Canada Award for Excellence in Video Art, 2003
- Canada's Governor General's Awards in Visual and Media Arts, 2010

video still from Exclusive Memory, Tom Sherman, 1987

== Public collections (selected) ==
National Gallery of Canada, Vancouver Art Gallery, Museum of Modern Art (New York), Whitney Museum of American Art, Art Gallery of Nova Scotia, Musee d'art contemporain (Montreal), Art Gallery of Ontario (Toronto), Ottawa Art Gallery, Municipality of Ottawa/Carleton, Northwestern University (Illinois), Museo Nacional Centro de Arte Reina Sofia (Madrid), Mel Hoppenheim School of Cinema (Montreal), University of Toronto, Ryerson University, Dalhousie Art Gallery (Halifax), Winnipeg Art Gallery, External Affairs/Government of Canada (Paris), The Banff Centre (Alberta), Rose Goldsen Archive of New Media Art/Cornell University, Concordia University Art Gallery, Art Metropole (Toronto), Nova Scotia College of Art and Design (Halifax), Modlin Center for the Arts, University of Richmond (Virginia), The Western Front (Vancouver).

== Personal ==
Sherman divides his time between Syracuse, New York and Port Mouton, Nova Scotia.
