= Birthday Suit – with scars and defects =

1974 video art tape by Lisa Steele

- Artist: Lisa Steele
- Year: 1974
- Medium: single channel black and white video
- Movement: video art

Birthday Suit – with scars and defects (1974) is a thirteen-minute black and white video art tape by Canadian artist Lisa Steele. It is her best known early work and depicts Steele "present[ing] her naked body to the unblinking gaze of the camera".

The tape itself is characterized by common practices of early video art, unedited with a static shot. Steele turns the camera on, walks to the end of the room/set and removes her clothing. She approaches the camera and begins to examine the various scars she's accumulated over her life up to that point. The work represents what critic Dot Tuer indicates is "an offering to the technological gaze [which] downplays the representation of the body as a gendered subject," and as film historian Catherine Russell points out, the work is a "counter-image to the emergent critique of the female body in narrative cinema." Steele's description of the work: "On the occasion of my 27th birthday I decided to do a tape that chronicled my passage through time. I have always been clumsy, tripping, dropping, falling with alarming regularity. This tape accepts the extent of the consequences."

Birthday Suit – with scars and defects was selected by Toronto International Film Festival as an essential part of Canada's cultural legacy.

== Background ==
Lisa Steele was born in Kansas City, Missouri in 1947 and immigrated to Canada in 1968. An important pioneer of video art in Canada since the early 1970s, Steele has shown internationally at the Venice Biennale (1980), the Kunsthalle (Basel), the Museum of Modern Art (NYC), the National Gallery of Canada, the Institute of Contemporary Art (Boston), 49th Parallel Videoseries, the Vancouver Art Gallery and the Long Beach Museum. Her videos are in collections worldwide, including The National Gallery of Canada, the Art Gallery of Ontario, the Museum of Contemporary Art (Houston, Texas), Ingrid Oppenheim, Concordia University (Montreal), Newcastle Polytechnic (England), Paulo Cardazzo (Milan), the Canadian Embassy (Tokyo) and the Akademie der Kunst (Berlin). She is a founding director of Vtape in Toronto, a national information and distribution service for independent video and a founding publisher and editor of FUSE Magazine.

Steele has collaborated exclusively with her partner Kim Tomczak since the early 1980s.

== Context and description ==
Steele's earliest works are part of a key moment in video art history, not only setting the tone for her later work but in particular, pioneering a language for a medium becoming crucial in 1970s Canadian art. Early video art in Canada made by women was a direct critique of mass media with an "awareness" of "media's manipulation" of the viewer. Birthday Suit – with scars and defects is a crucial early work that "has entered the canon of Western art history as one of the best examples of early feminist video art from Canada." Like much early video art, the work is performance-based, with a static camera and one angle. The entire twelve minutes is unedited and

the soundtrack consists entirely of the sounds and voice of the take. Notwithstanding the private and unspectacular setting, the strict form of Birthday Suit. With Scars and Defects – its seemingly rehearsed choreography, the chronological ordering of memory, and the unvarying repetition of gestures – unsettles the viewer’s spontaneous impression of an unedited sequence. Directly addressing the viewer as "you", moreover, contrasts with the otherwise private setting. Such gaze alignment, which the fixed camera position epitomizes, opens up the scene toward a literally "exhibitionist" affirmation of self.

In Birthday Suit with scars and defects Steele disrobes and examines the scars on her naked body, accumulated over her lifetime, on the day of her 27th birthday in order to channel the scars' "origin stories through the touch of her fingers, all in an effort to chart the marks endured in her twenty-seven years of life." Like much of her work in the 1970s, Birthday Suit addresses the video medium as "a gendered tool of power [as a] means of surveillance and social control, or of confession and self-examination."

== Early video art in Canada ==
By the 1970s artists, seeking more control over their work but also the display and distribution, turned to mass media, new technology and communication technologies. Video, photography and audio became the media of choice for artists with a feminist practice. In particular, women artists utilized performance and technology to both engage the viewer but also as a form of direct documentation, often utilizing the artist's body. Birthday Suit – with scars and defects is an important early example of feminist video art. Steele's approach to identity is both matter-of-fact but also fictionalized, employing irony and as an extension of conceptual art, practices of directness and banal bluntness.

Early video art employs approaches first found in performance and body art in the 1960s. Addressing voyeurism (both from the mass media and modernist impulses) and using documentary tropes, in particular direct cinema, the first generation of video art's concerns with sexuality and sexual politics aligned it with feminist discourse of the era. Feminist art in the early 1970s operated in the "ideological" and "linguistic" space of the body. Steele's Birthday Suit engages with "nudity, pain and memory", reinventing the "adult female body" through memory. A form of "critical embodiment" Steele's video self-portrait "counters normative 'pedagogical spectacles' of women's bodies" by emphasizing the "unhealthy... body in ways that forcefully enact embodied agency."

== Reception and legacy ==
For the 2017 Canadian sesquicentennial, the Toronto International Film Festival (TIFF) selected a list of the 150 essential moving-image productions made in Canada, determined "through a national poll of over 200 members of the film, television, advertising and music industry along with journalists, critics, scholars, and filmmakers." Birthday Suit – with scars and defects was selected as an essential part of Canada's cultural legacy.

Described as a canonical work of video art and body art, Birthday Suit – with scars and defects is also an important influence on later artists. An aspect of online video sharing, on platforms such as YouTube, Vimeo and Dailymotion, is the aesthetic of the amateur where "non-professionals, art students, or amateurists comprise the vast majority of videos." Often taking as their inspiration autobiographical video artworks of the 1970s, focusing on the physical body in front of the stationary camera, with minimal editing, the uploaders "physically or conceptually substitute the artist’s body and narrative for their own. In other words, uploaders employ the artist as a productive template for their recorded performances." Steele is one of the most widely appropriated artists on video-sharing websites. Online videos employ Steele's performance of body narrative, often emphasizing the unhealthy, scarred or marked. Like Steele's direct engagement with an absent viewer, these online homages forge complex relationships with viewers, albeit anonymously and not as art.

== Sources ==
- Brophy, Sarah and Janice Hladki. "Visual Autobiography in the Frame: Critical Embodiment and Cultural Pedagogy." Embodied Politics in Visual Autobiography, Sarah Brophy and Janice Hladki, eds. University of Toronto Press, 2014: 3-28. ISBN 1442646608
- Ferguson, Bruce. Canada Video: Colin Campbell, Pierre Falardeau/Julien Poulin, General Idea, Tom Sherman, Lisa Steele. Ottawa: The Gallery for the Corporation of National Museums of Canada, 1980.
- Findlay, Len. "Rumours of Our Breath." Border Crossings v. 12, no. 3 (July 1993): 50-53.
- Gale, Peggy. "Lisa Steele + Kim Tomczak." The Governor General's Awards in Visual and Media Arts 2005. Toronto: Canada Council for the Arts, 2005. 47-57.
- Gale, Peggy and Lisa Steele, eds. Video re/View: The (best) Source Book for Critical Writings on Canadian Artists' Video. Toronto: Art Metropole, 1996.
- Milroy, Sarah. "Video art, and how to survive it: It confounds most viewers, so Sarah Milroy decided to immerse herself in the medium. Here she surfaces with a primer for the rest of us." The Globe and Mail (Mar. 6, 2002).
- Quilty, Jim. "Closer" Art Review no. 31 (Apr. 2009).
- Russell, Catherine. "The Lisa Steele Tapes: Investigation and Vision." North of Everything: English-Canadian Cinema Since 1980. William Beard and Jerry White, eds. Edmonton: University of Alberta, 2002. ISBN 0-88864-390-X
- Tuer, Dot. "Perspectives of the Body in Canadian Video Art", C Magazine (Winter 1993): 32
