= Ciara Phillips =

Canadian-Irish artist

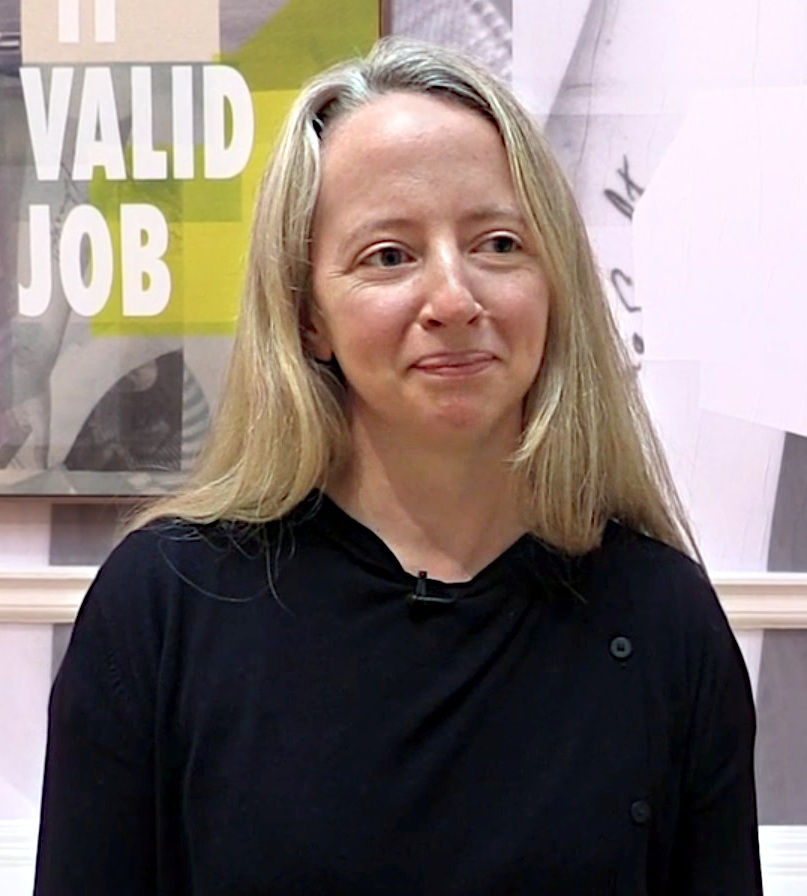
Phillips in 2015

Ciara Phillips (born 1976) is a Canadian-Irish artist based primarily in Glasgow, United Kingdom. Phillips was born in Ottawa, Canada. Her higher education was completed, first, at Queen's University in Kingston, Ontario, Canada (Bachelor of Fine Art — 1996/2000). Subsequently, she studied at the Glasgow School of Art, obtaining a Master in Fine Art (2002/2004). Her work exploits the traditional use of printmaking practices, taking much influence from collaboration and, more personally, the philosophies of artist and teacher Corita Kent. On 7 May 2014, she was nominated for the Turner Prize for her work at The Showroom in London, England.

== Life and career ==
Phillips' practice formally categorises as printmaking, however her use of material ranges from screenprinting to textiles equally using photography and wall painting. She often works collaboratively, re-conceptualising the norms of gallery spaces and involving other artists, designers and local community groups in her practice. Phillips draws much of her inspiration from Corita Kent (1918/1986), a pioneering artist, educator and activist famous for her reinterpretations of advertising slogans and imagery relevant to 1960s consumer culture. She is the founder of the artist collective Poster Club and her ongoing project titled (Workshop 2010—) has been subject to various reiterations after its initial exhibit at The Showroom Gallery in London won her a nomination for the Turner Prize in 2014.

== Artist style ==
A key aspect of Phillips' art practice is the compositional techniques that are devoid of traditional representational systems. In other words, Phillips' work speaks to the idea that no one narrative can possibly account for all aspects of human experience. In a review done by the Generation Guide, Askew explains the necessity of this medium for the message Phillips attempts to discuss in her work. In a manner contingent with the experimental nature of printmaking — the time, space, and collaborative aspect which distinguish it from directly drawing onto the page — are all key aspects of Phillips' vision. Along with these aforementioned notions, comes the historical associations of printing with political and social activism. Phillips' work exploits these notions, coupled with an effort to re-appropriate the idea of art as an instrument for change.

Much of these ideas stem from the educator and activist Sister Corita Kent, an American artist and teacher. At the core of Phillips' practice comes a collaborative aspect equally functioning as a teaching aspect in the same right. Begging the feminist critique; by turning women into artists; are images created by women different from those created by men?

== Selected works ==
=== Comrade Objects - Agnes Etherington Art Centre - Kingston ===
Phillips' Comrade Objects exhibition was held at the Agnes Etherington Art Centre in Kingston, Ontario (Fall 2016). This work focuses on Phillip's visual language and use of semiotics akin to many artists that influence her work. This being, her first major exhibition in Canada, draws upon her interest in collaboration — including a rendition of her Turner Prize-Nominated Workshop (2010 –— ongoing) as well as a body of work done in partnership with Clive Robertson, a Canadian artist and curator. At the same time, this exhibition, with its emphasis on involvement, featured a residency engaging equally with the Kingston community and Queen's University students, like the Fine Art (Visual Art) Program.

=== Workshop (2010–ongoing) - The Showroom - London ===
This is an ongoing project installed as a large-scale workshop, and functions as a temporary print studio during an exhibition. This was first completed in the Showroom Gallery in London, England and was the project that resulted in Phillips' Turner Prize nomination. Throughout the first iteration of this work, Phillips invited community members and local women's groups to participate in screenprinting. She explores the potential of the experimental and wider uses of print.

=== What We Recognize In Others - CCA Derry Londonderry ===
The exhibition of work known as What we Recognize in Others, was Phillips' first solo show in the United Kingdom since her nomination for a Turner Prize in 2014. In this body of work, she screen-printed a collection of photos of her peers onto fabric with text and layers of colour printed overtop in an effort to mask and highlight areas of these photographs. She furthers this layering technique by subsequently layering the walls of the gallery with paintings and fabric, mirroring the work itself. In many ways, this work serves to discuss the handmade quality of work and emphasise the gestural relationships rooted in collaboration. Though Phillips is widely known for her collaborative work, this exhibition was done exclusively on her own. It explains the roots of feminism within her work as well as an emphasis on her influences from historical print-making as a tool for social and political activism.

== Sources ==
- Barnet, Sylvan. A short guide to writing about art. Upper Saddle River, NJ: Pearson, 2015.
- "Ciara Phillips: NO / OK." The Showroom
- "Centre for Contemporary Art Derry~Londonderry." CCA Derry~Londonderry | Ciara Phillips' 'What we recognize in others' reviewed by Nathan O'Donnell for This Is Tomorrow. Accessed February 9, 2017.
- "Exhibitions." Ciara Phillips: Comrade Objects | Agnes Etherington Art Centre. Accessed February 8, 2017.
