= Lorna Boschman =

Canadian artist and filmmaker

Lorna Boschman (1955) is a Canadian Queer media artist, film maker, curator, educator, editor, and camera operator working with themes such as sexual identity, body image, social justice, (dis)ability, cancer, abuse, health, and self-advocacy.

== Life ==
Boschman was born in Carrot River, Saskatchewan, in 1955. In 2005, she graduated from Emily Carr University of Art and Design with a BFA in Film & Video. She received her master's degree and PhD from Simon Fraser University in 2007 and 2012, in Interactive Arts and Technology. Boschman worked as an arts administrator at Vancouver's Video In Studios (now called VIVO Media Arts Centre) before continuing on her masters and doctoral studies at Simon Fraser University.

In 1992 and 2007, Boschman directed Drawing the Line (1992), True Inversions (1992), and Before the New Millennium (2007), about Vancouver's Kiss & Tell Collective, a "performance and artist collective whose work is concerned with lesbian sexuality."

== Career ==
Boschman was featured in Montréal's 29 Festival International Du Film Sur L'Art in 2011, at the Panorama of Quebec and Canadian Video, where two evenings of her retrospective works were showcased and curated by Nicole Gringas. Her work has also been shown internationally, in retrospectives as theatrical programmes in Brussels in 2014, exhibitions in Milan that same year, as well as at the Museum of Modern Art in New York. Her short film Scars (1987) dealt with self-mutilation and cutting by young women. Scars was included in a notable travelling exhibition called Rebel Girls: A Survey of Canadian Feminist Videotapes 1974-1988. Our Normal Childhood (1988) explored childhood sexual abuse.

From 2012 until 2016, Boschman worked as Project Manager and Faculty Associate for Cancer's Margins, a research study focusing on LGBT2Q persons who have been diagnosed with, and treated for breast and/or gynaecological cancers. The work explores the experiences these people face, how they can or have access care, how they are communicated information about their health, and the support they receive during treatment. Working alongside Dr. Mary Bryson, Boschman led Cancer's Margins Digital Storytelling Workshops, and also worked as a mentor for patients with metastatic cancer.

== Permanent collections ==
Boschman's video works Scars (1987) and Our Normal Childhood (1988) are in the National Gallery of Canada's permanent collection. Her work Drawing the Line is included in the permanent collection of the Centre audiovisuel Simone de Beauvoir in Paris.

== Awards ==
Boschman has won several awards for her work, including the NFB Kathleen Shannon Award at Yorkton Short Film & Video Festival, for Inside/OUT! (2000); the Judge's Award, Northwest Film and Video Festival for True Inversions (1992); and during the 2016 Vancouver's Mayor's Arts Awards, Boschman was nominated as an honoree in Film & New Media by a panel of her peers.

== Media artworks ==
- Scars (1987)
- Butch/Femme in Paradise (1988)
- Our Normal Childhood (1988)
- Family Secrets (1990)
- Doing Time (1991)
- Drawing the Line (1992)
- True Inversions (1992)
- Big Fat Slenderella (1993)
- Poodle Diet (1994)
- Fat World (1994)
- Sunnybrook (1995)
- A Cancer Video (1996)
- Dr. Lorna's Seven Day Poodle Diet (1998)
- Boy Girl (1999)
- From the Inside/OUT (2000)
- kickstART! A Celebration (2003)
- Walking Women (2004)
- this ability (2006)
- Before the New Millenium (2007)
- Thanksgiving Dinner (2007)
- Mother Daughter Bake Off (2014)
