= Hélène Bourgault =

Canadian video and film artist

Hélène Bourgault (May 16, 1945 - October 14, 2006) was a Canadian video and film artist. Bourgault was born in Quebec City, Quebec, Canada and died in Montreal, Quebec, Canada. Bourgault was a founding member of GIV, the Groupe Intervention Video, a feminist video production and distribution collective in Montreal, Quebec. As a member of GIV, she co-directed several video documentaries with fellow artist Helen Doyle, including Chaperons Rouges (1979) which was included in a notable traveling exhibition called Rebel Girls: A Survey of Canadian Feminist Videotapes 1974-1988. Chaperons rouges has won two awards, one at the Second Video Open in Toronto in 1979 and another at the Festival international de films de femmes in Sceaux in 1981.

Her work is included in the collections of the National Gallery of Canada and the Cinematheque quebecoise.

== Filmography ==
=== Director ===
Pays d'abondance? (1970), documentary short

Partir pour la famille? (1974), documentary short

Témoignage de Francine (1979), video documentary short

Une nef ... et ses sorcières (1977), with Hélène Roy, Helen Doyle, and Nicole Giguère

Chaperons rouges (1979), video co-directed with Helen Doyle

Le Centre Flora Tristan (1984), video documentary short

Fem do chi, self défense pour femmes (1984), documentary short

End of a Millennium/Fin de millénaire (1994), for the National Film Board of Canada, documentary

Les soeurs Lumière: 100 ans de cinéma de femmes (1996), documentary
