= Walthamstow International Film Festival =

Annual film festival in London, England

- Location: London, England
- Founded: 2010
- Language: International
- Website: e17films.com

Walthamstow International Film Festival (WIFF) is an annual film festival in Walthamstow, London, with a focus on short films by local and international filmmakers.

The event was initially organized in 2010 to return the presence of film to the district for the E17 Art Trail event. Walthamstow was once home to the silent film studio Walthamstow Studios during the 1920s. Sponsors have included Time Out magazine and the British Film Institute. Established in 2010, the Walthamstow International Film Festival was co-founded by Paul (Fletch) Fletcher and Liza Fletcher, and has been held annually since.

In 2018 co-founders Liza Fletcher and Paul Fletcher accepted the London Borough of Waltham Forest Arts and Culture Award that the Walthamstow (International) Short Film Festival won at the Love Your Borough Awards ceremony at Wathamstow Assembly. CDS sponsored the 2018 (3rd annual) Love Your Borough Awards ceremony.

== Editions ==
=== 2010 WIFF ===
The first annual WIFF was held between 5 and 12 September in the Walthamstow Village centre. The screenings occurred during the E17 Art Trail. The WIFF 2010 panel of judges included Stella Creasy (Walthmstow MP), Dominic Stinton (director/documentarian), and David Jenkins (Time Out London film critic).

=== 2011 WIFF ===
The second annual WIFF was held between 2 and 11 September. It built on the success of the previous year's festival, and over 900 visitors viewed short movie screenings in the Walthamstow Village. The organizers enlisted a panel of judges that included Oona King King (former MP/baroness), Barry Bliss (Walthamstow director), David Jenkins (film critic) and Paul McGann (Withnail and I actor).

=== 2012 WIFF ===
The third annual WIFF was held at Vestry House Museum on 8 and 15 September. The panel of judges included David Jenkins (critic), Barry Bliss (director), and Noel Goodwin (BFI's director of youth education).

1st Place winner was Kieron Clark's Gas. 2nd Place winner was Kim Noce and Shaun Clark's High. 3rd Place winner was Otis Tree's Action Movie.

=== 2013 WIFF ===
The fourth annual WIFF was held at The Stow Film Lounge on 13 and 14 July. Workshops were held at Vestry House Museum on 6 July 2013. The panel of judges included Barry Bliss (film director), Noel Goodwin (BFI educator), Georgina Starr (installation artist/filmmaker), and Pauline Black (actress/presenter).

1st Place winner was Hassan Vawda's My Photographs. 2nd Place winner and Best Drama category winner was Rene Nuijens' The First Yugoslavian Cosmonaut. Joint 3rd Place winners were Guillame Bastien's Déjà Vu and Otis Tree's Time Warp, which also won the Best Youth category. Best Animation category winner was Dee Honeybun and Lesley Palmer's Lega’say.

=== 2014 WIFF ===
The fifth annual WIFF was held at the Vestry House on 1 June, with categories including Drama, Documentary, Animation, Experimental and First Film. The panel of judges included Liza Fletcher, Pamela Stephenson, Richard Hobbs, Barry Bliss, and Noel Goodwin.

1st Place winner was Hardy D Saleh' Documentary Mother. 2nd Place winner was Moehring-Gabriels OOA. 3rd Place winner was Kimberley Carroll, Saraph Saleh and Richardo Reverson Blanco's One By One. Best Drama category winner was Andrew Stewart and Sharon Reeh's One for the Road. Best Experimental category winner was Antti Polojarvi's Underdog Dream. Best Animation category winner was Moehring-Gabriels' IOA. 1st Place Audience Vote winner was Ellie Mumford's Animation The Dog Song. 2nd Place Audience Vote winner was Naren Wilks' One Man, Eight Cameras, and 3rd Place Audience Vote winner was Tyrell Charles' M Sobrienska's The King's Legacy.

=== 2015 WIFF ===
The sixth annual WIFF was held on 14 June at the Empire Cinema with categories including Animation, Drama, Experimental, and Young Person's. The Silent Film category was added in 2015. The panel of judges was composed of directors, producers and critics and the winners were decided at the British Film Institute on 29 May 2015.

1st Place winner was Jessica Bishopp's Speed. The 2nd Place winner was Teymour Ghaderi's It hit upon the roof. 3rd Place and Best Silent category winner was Paul Murphy's Wipeout. Best Experimental category winner was Dee Honeybun's Probably, Maybe, Not Really, Whatever. The MMBF 'Rising Star' Award was Stanley Tucker's Rain. The Best Animation category winner was Viviane Peoc'h's Grandma.

=== 2016 WIFF ===
The seventh annual WIFF was held on 23 July at The Empire Cinema Walthamstow and Vestry House Museum, with categories including Animation, Silent, Experimental and Documentary.

1st Place winner and Best Silent category winner was Elena Broadach's Silence. 3rd Place winner and also Best Documentary category winner was Carol Gyasi's Kayayo.

=== 2017 WIFF ===
The eighth annual WIFF was held on 3 and 4 June at the Vestry House Museum with categories including Animation, Documentary, Experimental, Drama, Silent, and Young Person's.

Joint 1st Place winners were Micaela D'Angelo and Naima Mebchour's Experimental II.NO Exit and the Syrian documentary The Wall. Highly Commended winner was Holy Family Sixth Form's White Noise.

=== 2018 WIFF ===
The ninth annual WIFF was held on 23 and 24 June at the Vestry House Museum with categories that included Documentary, Drama, Experimental, Animation and Under 18s. The panel of judges included Janet Awe (scripted comedy development producer), Barry Bliss (Walthamstow film director/photographer), Ed Cross (director/producer of digital content at M-Integrated Solutions), Wayne Jones (cinema manager of Empire Cinema Group) and Hassan Vawda (Walthamstow based artist/film director).

1st Place winner and joint winner of Under 18s was Jordan Benjamin's drama Forgotten. The 2nd Place winner and joint winner in Under 18s category was Marcus Green's Rose, and 3rd Place winner and category winner for Best Experimental was Non Films' Dull Hope. Carol Gyasi's Skateboard Blues was category winner for Best Documentary and Marcos Mereles' The Dead Man Speaks was category winner for Best Drama.

=== 2019 WIFF ===
The tenth annual WIFF was held on 15 and 16 June at the Vestry House Museum with categories that included Documentary, Drama, Experimental, Animation, and Young Person's. The panel of judges included Janet Awe (scripted comedy development producer), Barry Bliss (film director), Ed Cross (digital content producer/director), Pinny Grylls (documentary film-maker and video ethnographer), and Wayne Jones (Empire Cinema manager).

Joint 1st Place winners were Flora Bradwell's Animation Waltham Forest Bath and Kazuya Ashizawa's Documentary My Theatre. 2nd Place winner was the Mission Grove Primary School's The Magical Portal in the Under 18s category. Highly Commended winners were Bakhtiar Khalili's Drama Souvenir and Gystere's Drama WOMXN. The Best Experimental category winner was Kent Tate's Velocity.

=== 2021 WIFF ===
The eleventh annual WIFF was held on the 10th of July at The Truman Social Club, after the event was postponed in 2020. The short films presented in the 2020/2021 WIFF were selected from over 70 local and international entrants from the Animation, Documentary, Drama, Experimental, and U18 categories.
