= Laura Vickerson =

Canadian artist (born 1959)

- Born: 1959 (age 66–67); Edmonton, Alberta, Canada
- Education: M.F.A., Department of Visual Art, University of Victoria; B.F.A., Department of Art & Design, University of Alberta
- Known for: installation artist, fabric artist
- Awards: 2003 Calgary ARTWALK Honouree
- Website: http://www.lauravickerson.com

Laura Vickerson (born 1959 in Edmonton, Alberta) is a Canadian artist who works with mixed media in site-specific situations. She often includes discarded household items in her projects as a comment on changing trends, consumerism and human relationships with everyday objects. Vickerson was a professor in Craft and Emerging Media at the Alberta College of Art and Design, where she taught starting in 1989. Vikerson retired in 2020 and is now a Professor Emeritus.

== Exhibitions ==
Vickerson has exhibited at the Biennale du Lin in Quebec, the 5th Istanbul Biennial, Textile Museum of Canada, Surrey Art Gallery, the Southern Alberta Art Gallery and the Oakville Galleries.

== Works ==
In 2018, she was part of the exhibition entitled Fabrications at the Kelowna Art Gallery, along with three fellow women installation artists from different regions of Canada -- Libby Hague, Gisele Amantea, and Yael Brotman. Her piece, entitled Air, invites guests to lie barefoot below a canopy of cream-coloured translucent pieces of used clothing that she sewed together and suspended nearly 10 feet above the floor.

Fairy Tales and Factories was a site specific work created by Laura Vickerson for Locus+ in Newcastle upon Tyne, England and exhibited March 26–April 9, 1999. It was her first show in the UK. The installation consisted of a cape, 4 metres wide and 21 metres long, created from hundreds of thousands of rose petals pinned to organza. The garment was made on-site at Farfield Mill, which closed after 169 years of linen production, in collaboration with a local women's group, the Sedbergh Stitchers. Conversations with them and people connected to the building were recorded and played during the show.
