= Libby Hague =

Canadian artist

- Born: Mary Elizabeth Hague; 1950 (age 75–76); St. Thomas, Ontario
- Education: Sir George Williams University (now Concordia University)
- Known for: installation artist, printmaker, screen printer, lithographer, filmmaker
- Website: libbyhague.com

Libby Hague RCA (born 1950) is a Canadian artist based in Toronto, Ontario. She is known for her large scale print installations. Her work has been exhibited in prominent galleries across Canada, including the Art Gallery of Ontario.

== Background ==
Born in St. Thomas, Ontario, Hague received her B.F.A. from Sir George Williams University (now Concordia University) in 1971. She is known for her large scale installations composed primarily of paper and prints. She is a member of the cooperative Loop Gallery, and is also affiliated with Open Studio, where she served as vice president from 1988 to 1990. From 1988 to 2002 she taught print-making at Sheridan College. She is represented in many public collections and galleries across Canada, including the Donovan Collection at the University of Toronto. Hague's work deals with themes of disaster, precariousness, and hope. Her complex works often have playful qualities, and she has described her process as experimental and fluid.
