= Holly King (artist) =

Canadian artist (born 1957)

- Born: 1957 (age 67–68); Montreal, Quebec
- Website: hollykingart.com

Holly King (born 1957) is a Canadian artist based in Montreal, known for her photographs of constructed landscapes. She views landscape as a product of the imagination.

== Career ==
For thirty years, Holly King has been making meticulously staged images from miniature theaters, groups of small sculptures composed of plants in the foreground, paintings as a backdrop and cleverly reflected lighting, to give rise, once photographed, to large-scale landscapes through which King hopes to reveal the beautiful and sublime. For the last 10 years, King has moved back and forth between constructed images to images of real places and back again. She sometimes added machine elements or constructed small still life subjects from plants.

King studied visual arts at Laval University, where she earned her BFA in 1979. She then studied visual arts and modern dance at York University, completing her MFA in 1981. The Canadian Centre of Contemporary Photography organized a travelling show of her photography in 1998. In 2016, Linda Jansma curated a travelling mid-career retrospective of her work for the Robert McLaughlin Gallery in Oshawa, Ontario, titled Holly King: Edging Towards the Mysterious. It showed the last 10 years of her work, both constructions and her more recent "viewing boxes".

King has been teaching at Concordia University in Montreal since 1983.

== Collections ==
Her work is included in the collections of the Musée national des beaux-arts du Québec, the Montreal Museum of Fine Arts the Robert McLaughlin Gallery, Concordia University, and the National Gallery of Canada
