= Silver Wave Film Festival =

Canadian film festival

The Silver Wave Film Festival is an annual film festival, which takes place in Fredericton, New Brunswick, Canada. Organized by the New Brunswick Film Cooperative, the festival programs a lineup of Canadian and international films, with a special but not exclusive focus on films made within the province of New Brunswick.

The event was launched in 2001 as the Tidal Wave Film Festival, with screenings taking place at Tilley Hall on the University of New Brunswick campus. It subsequently moved to the city's Charlotte Street Arts Centre as its primary venue, although the University of New Brunswick remains a sponsor of the event and still hosts some screenings. It changed its name to Silver Wave in 2005.

Due to the COVID-19 pandemic in Canada, the 2020 festival was staged entirely online.
