= Sara Diamond (academic administrator) =

Canadian artist and former university president

Sara Louise Diamond CM OOnt
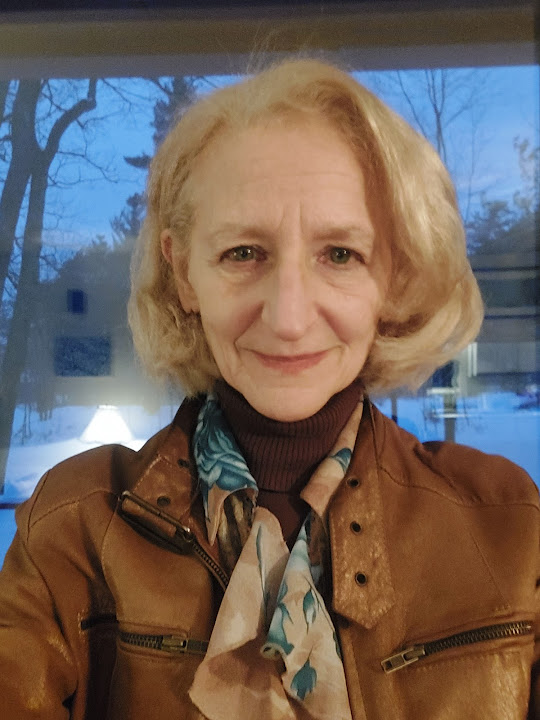
- Dr. Sara Diamond in Georgian Bay (winter)
- Born: 9 March 1954 (age 72); The Bronx, NYC
- Known for: video artist
- Awards: Bell Canada Award in Video Art 1995

Sara Louise Diamond, CM OOnt RCA (born 9 March 1954) is a Canadian artist, designer, researcher and academic administrator. She is President Emeritus of OCAD University, Canada.

== Biography ==
Sara Louise Diamond was born in the Bronx, New York City, USA in 1954. During the 60s Diamond emigrated to Toronto, Ontario, Canada. Diamond's father was the executive director of the Jewish Family and Child Services. Her mother was a professor at the University of Toronto.

In New York, Diamond was a student at the Ethical Culture Fieldston School, in Manhattan. After emigrating to Toronto, Diamond attended the SEED Alternative school, which was known as a "free school", and influenced by the pedagogical philosophies of progressive educators Jean Piaget and A.S. Neill.

Diamond has an undergraduate Honours BA in Communications and History from Simon Fraser University, and a master's degree in Digital Media Theory from the University of the Arts, London.

Diamond holds a PhD in computing, information technology and engineering, from the University of East London, England, with a focus on data visualization. Diamond was the artistic director of media and visual art and director of research at the Banff Centre, where she created the Banff New Media Institute in 1995 and led it until 2005. Diamond taught at Emily Carr Institute of Art and Design, at Capilano College, at the California Institute for the Arts and remains an adjunct professor at UCLA.

She is a member of the Royal Canadian Academy of Arts. In 2012 she was made a member of the Order of Ontario.

Diamond began her career as a labour activist in Vancouver during the 1970s and 1980s, working with the Association of University and College Employees (AUCE) to organize non-unionized labourers at the University of British Columbia. While a student at Simon Fraser University (SFU), she combined activism with academic studies in history, communications, and the arts, producing research that led to the Women’s Labour History Project. Between 1979 and 1980, she conducted and recorded 43 oral history interviews with women active in British Columbia’s labour movement from the 1890s onward. These interviews, housed at SFU Archives, document women’s working lives, family experiences, and union activism, and became foundational to her subsequent publications and media work.

Diamond held several leadership roles at the Banff Centre, including Director of Television and Radio (1992–1994), Director of Research (2003–2005), and founder and Artistic Director of the Banff New Media Institute (1994–2005). Her work integrated media production, research, and artistic experimentation, and she became a central figure in the development of Canadian digital and new media arts.

In 2005, Diamond was appointed President of OCAD University in Toronto, where she advanced initiatives in media arts, digital design, and research partnerships. Reappointed as President and Vice-Chancellor in 2014, she continued to shape the university’s direction as a hub for creativity, technology, and critical inquiry. Her tenure ended on June 30, 2020, whereupon she was appointed Dr. Diamond President Emerita in recognition of her service.

Diamond is founding Chair of the Mobile Experience Innovation Centre and current co-chair (with RBC). She is co-principal investigator on the Centre for Information Visualization/Data Driven Design, an OCAD U/York University major initiative and sits on the board of the National Centre of Excellence GRAND. Diamond continues to write and lecture on the subjects of digital media history, digital media, strategic foresight; mobility and design strategy for peer-reviewed journals and acts as a reviewer and evaluator for IEEE and ACM conferences and journals; SSHRC, CFI and the Canada Research Chair programs. Her artwork is held by prestigious collections such as the Museum of Modern Art, NYC and the National Gallery of Canada.

== Art career ==
Diamond's work as an artist was shown in exhibitions including at the National Gallery of Canada, the Museum of Modern Art, and the Vancouver Art Gallery. In 1992, Diamond's work was shown in a retrospective titled Memories Revisited, History Retold, organized by the National Gallery of Canada. During her time as an undergraduate student at Simon Fraser University, Diamond created the Women's Labour History Project, which, beginning in 1978, collected the oral histories of women who were active in the trade union movement, published resources on the women, toured a photo exhibition, and produced videos of the histories. The project is now housed in the Simon Fraser University Archives.

=== Works ===
Year	Title	Credit
1980	Influences of My Mother	Director
1984	Heroics: A Quest	Director
1988	Keeping the Home Fires Burning	Director
1990-1991	The Lull Before the Storm	Director
1992	On to Ottawa	Director
1992	Paternity	Director
1996	The Dream of the Night Cleaners	Producer
1998	Singing Our Stories	Executive producer

== Awards ==
- 2018: Inspiring 50: Advancement of diversity of STEM fields, Government of Netherlands and Senate of Canada
- 2017: Canada 150 Women: Leaders, Champions and Luminaries
- 2014: Toronto Life's 50 Most Influential
- 2014: Appointed as senior fellow, Massey College, University of Toronto
- 2013: Awarded Queen's Diamond Jubilee Medal for significant contributions to
- Canada
- 2013: Awarded Digital Media Pioneer, Grand National Centre of Excellence
- 2012: Awarded Order of Ontario
- 2009: Nominated and inducted into the Royal Canadian Academy of Art
- 2003: CodeZebra – Winner of Canadian Digital Innovation Award
- 2002: Educator of the Year – Canadian New Media Awards
- 1995: Bell Canada Award in Video Art 1995
- 1990: Dean's Medal and gold medal for outstanding achievement in History, History Department, Simon Fraser University
- 1990: The Stephen McIntyre Book Prize, Simon Fraser University

== Author's publications ==
- Diamond, Sara (2011). Artists & Designers: An Experiment in Data Visualization. 8th ACM conference on Creativity and cognition (C&C '11). New York, New York: ACM. pp. 195–196. doi:10.1145/2069618.2069651. ISBN 978-1-4503-0820-5.
- Diamond, Sara; Cook, Sarah, eds. (2011). Euphoria & Dystopia: The Banff New Media Dialogues. Banff: Banff Centre Press. ISBN 9780920159712.
- Diamond, Sara (2005). Participation, Flow, and the Redistribution of Authorship: The Challenges of collaborative Exchange and New Media Curatorial Practice. Museums and the Web 2005: Proceedings, Mar. 31 Spring, 2005.
- Pearce, Celia; Diamond, Sara; Beam, Mark (2003). "Bridges I: Interdisciplinary Collaboration as Practice". Leonardo. 36 (2). MIT Press: 123–128. doi:10.1162/002409403321554189. JSTOR 1577438. S2CID 57568902.
- Diamond, Sara; Kibbins, Gary (1998). Total recall: History, memory & new documentary. Vancouver: Satellite Video Exchange Society.
