= Vanguard (magazine) =

Defunct Canadian art periodical

Vanguard was a periodical produced in Vancouver, British Columbia, Canada from 1972 to 1989, containing reviews and critical articles on Canadian art and artists. The magazine was successor to the Vancouver Art Gallery Bulletin which existed between 1933 and 1971. It was published monthly by the Vancouver Art Gallery from 1972 to 1984. The first issue of Vanguard appeared in January 1972. In February 1979 it was redesigned as a glossy, full format, perfect-bound, magazine with full-colour photographs of artwork featuring longer articles, usually on individual artists, in front, and short, illustrated, reviews of current exhibitions in Canada in back. Its coverage also expanded to include national art events. Canadian arts writers were featured along with three American art critics: Donald Kuspit, Erik ReeL (as Gary Reel), and Matthew Kangas. The magazine was published by the Vancouver Society for Critical Arts Publications from 1985 to 1989, when it ceased publication. Full holdings can be found at the Vancouver Art Gallery library.
