= Colin Campbell (artist) =

Canadian video artist

- Born: June 15, 1942; Reston, Manitoba, Canada
- Died: October 31, 2001; Toronto, Ontario, Canada (age 59)
- Education: University of Manitoba, Claremont Graduate School
- Known for: Video artist
- Awards: Bell Canada Award for Video Art, 1996

Colin Campbell (June 15, 1942 – October 31, 2001) was a Canadian video artist.

== Life ==
Colin Campbell was born in Reston, Manitoba, 1942. He received his BFA from the University of Manitoba (gold medal) and his MFA from Claremont Graduate School, California. Campbell's first academic position was at Mount Allison University, Sackville, New Brunswick, the subject of his video Sackville, I'm Yours. Campbell moved to Toronto in 1973, where he taught at the Ontario College of Art and later (from 1980) in the Department of Fine Art at the University of Toronto. Based in Toronto since 1973, Campbell produced over 45 tapes.

Campbell was active in the artist-run centre movement and was a founding member of Vtape. He was active as a curator and a producer of artists' books.

Campbell saw himself as bisexual and bigendered.

Colin Campbell died of cancer on October 31, 2001, in Toronto.

== Work ==
Campbell was a pioneer of video art in Canada. He began exploring video in the early 1970's when the use of video in visual arts was still marginal. He created one of his earliest videos, Sackville I'm Yours (1972) using a video camera borrowed from the Mount Allison University football team during the off season. In the video he plays the persona of "Art Star", a legend in his own mind responding to a media interview while "roughing it out" in rural New Brunswick.

Campbell used video as an accessible and flexible means for story telling. Starring in almost all of his works, his videos explore themes of gender and sexual identity with humour and pathos.

Campbell's work has been exhibited internationally since the mid-1970s, including the 1977 São Paulo Biennale, 1980 Venice Biennale and 1992 Istanbul Biennale. In 1990 the Winnipeg Art Gallery organized a national touring retrospective of his videotapes (1972–90). His first film, Skin, premiered at the Festival of Festivals (Toronto International Film Festival) in 1991. In 2008, Oakville Galleries held a retrospective exhibition of Campbell's work.

His work has been reenacted by contemporary artists including Amy Siegel. In 2021, Siegel screened Sackville I'm Yours...Too, as an homage to the artist and rural queer communities, at festivals including Silver Wave Film Festival and SappyFest.

In 2013 Canadian artist Benny Nemer revisited Campbell's 1972 video True/False. Originally intended as a remake, Nemer's work, Colin is my real name, instead summons Campbell's voice to once again speak statements related to his identity and private life. Nemer's video was filmed at Mount Allison University, where True/False was originally produced. It was exhibited on the university campus and premiered at the Per Speculum Video exhibition at the Frankfurter Kunstverein in 2013.

== Awards ==
Campbell was awarded the Bell Canada Award in Video Art in 1996.

== Select videography ==
- Sackville, I'm Yours (1972)
- Janus (1973)
- The Woman From Malibu (1976)
- Modern Love (1978)
- Bad Girls (1980)
- White Money (1983)
- The Woman Who Went too Far (1984)
- Bennies from Heaven (1986)
- No Voice Over (1986)
- Black and Light (1987)
- Fiddle Faddle (1988)
- Rendez-vous (1991)
- Invention (1993)

== Collections ==
- Museum of Modern Art
- National Gallery of Canada
- Canada Council Art Bank
- Canadian Cultural Centre, Paris
- Oakville Galleries
- Centre Georges Pompidou
- Owens Art Gallery, Mount Allison University
