= Vera Frenkel =

Canadian artist

- Born: November 10, 1938 (age 87); Bratislava, Czechoslovakia
- Education: Fine Arts
- Notable work: String Games (1974), ...from the Transit Bar (1992), ONCE NEAR WATER: Notes from the Scaffolding Archive (2008), The Blue Train (2012-2014)
- Awards: Governor General's Awards in Visual and Media Arts (2005)
- Website: www.verafrenkel.com

Vera Frenkel RCA FRSC (born November 10, 1938) is a Canadian multidisciplinary artist based in Toronto. Her installations, videotapes, performances and new media projects address the forces at work in human migration, the learning and unlearning of cultural memory, and the ever-increasing bureaucratization of experience.

== Biography ==
Vera Frenkel was born in Bratislava, Czechoslovakia, lived in England during her childhood, and resided in Canada for her adult life. Frenkel graduated with a degree in Fine Arts from McGill University in 1959, then pursued further studies in Montreal under Arthur Lismer and Albert Dumouchel.

She has exhibited in solo and group shows in Canada and internationally since the early 1970s. Her work has been exhibited at Documenta IX, the Offenes Kulturhaus, Linz; the Setagaya Art Museum, Tokyo, the National Gallery of Canada, Ottawa, the Museum of Modern Art, New York, and the Biennale di Venezia.

== Work ==
In 1974, Frenkel worked with the Bell Canada Teleconferencing Studios to produce the work String Games: Improvisations for Inter-City Video, the first artwork in Canada to use telecommunications technologies. This was an early work of Internet art.

One of Frenkel's major works, ...from the Transit Bar (1992), is a multi-media installation with a functioning bar and video monitors playing individuals testimonials recounting themes such as exile, translation and cultural migration. It was a collaboration between the National Gallery of Canada and The Power Plant. It was initially exhibited in 1992 at documenta IX in Kassel, Germany, toured Europe in the 1990s and has been most recently re-exhibited at the National Gallery of Canada in the spring and summer of 2014.

ONCE NEAR WATER: Notes from the Scaffolding Archive (2008) is a videotape about a city cut off from its lake and uses the scaffolding as a metaphor for both aspiration and loss. In the opening lines, its voice over narrative discusses the lake and sets the stage for the piece. According to the artist's website, "This report is about a lake, and about longing. Also about greed, and about ways of bearing witness. I don't know the whole story, one never does."

== Major exhibitions ==
Frenkel's solo exhibitions include the following: Likely Stories: Text/Image/Sound Works for Video and Installation (Agnes Etherington Art Centre, Kingston, Ontario, 1982); Raincoats, Suitcases, Palms (Art Gallery of York University, Toronto, 1993); from the Transit Bar (Museum Fridericianum, Kassel, The Power Plant Contemporary Art Gallery, Toronto, 1994–95, and National Gallery of Canada, 1996); and Body Missing (Offenes Kulturhaus, Linz, Austria 1996; Gesellschaft für Aktuelle Kunst, Bremen, Germany, 1996–97). In recent years, Frenkel has exhibited her works at Centre Culturel Canadien (Paris, 2002) and the Freud Museum (London, UK, 2003). Between November 15 and December 28, 2014, the Museum of Contemporary Canadian Art presented Ways of Telling, an exhibition presenting Frenkel's work from the early 1970s to present, including her more recent works. ONCE NEAR WATER: Notes from the Scaffolding Archive (2008) and The Blue Train (2012–2014). The exhibit was curated by the National Gallery of Canada's Associate Curator, Contemporary Art, Jonathan Shaughnessy.

Some examples of Frenkel's group exhibitions include the following: OKanada (Akademie der Künste, Berlin, 1982–83); Vestiges of Empire (Camden Arts Centre, London, UK, 1984); Rebel Girls: A Survey of Canadian Feminist Videotapes 1974-1988 (National Gallery of Canada, Ottawa, Canada, 1989);...from the Transit Bar (Documenta IX, Kassel, Germany, 1992); Shifting Paradigms (Bucharest, 1994); Beyond National Identities (Tokyo, Kyoto, and Sapporo, Japan, 1995); and Archival Dialogues: Reading the Black Star Collection (Toronto, Ontario, Canada, 2012).

== Awards and honours ==
Frenkel was the recipient of the 1989 Canada Council Molson Prize, the 1994 Toronto Arts Foundation Visual Arts Award, the 1993 Gershon Iskowitz Prize, the 1999 Bell Canada Award for Video Art and the 2007 iDMAa Pioneering Achievement Award. In 2005 she was awarded the Governor General's Awards in Visual and Media Arts by the Canada Council for the Arts. She has received honorary doctorates from the Nova Scotia College of Art and Design (NSCAD) (1996) and the Emily Carr Institute (2004), and is a member of the Royal Canadian Academy of Arts and inducted into the Royal Society of Canada Academies of Arts, Humanities and Sciences in 2006.
