= Nell Tenhaaf =

Canadian artist, teacher, and writer (born 1951)

- Born: 1951 (age 74–75); Oshawa, Ontario
- Education: Concordia, Montreal, QC
- Known for: Electronic art

Nell Tenhaaf (born in 1951 in Oshawa, Ontario) is a Canadian artist, teacher, writer and feminist.

Nell received a B.F.A. in 1974 and a M.F.A. in 1989 both from Concordia University, Montreal, Quebec.

The bulk of Tenhaaf’s art was produced during the time that she lived in Montreal, Quebec (since 1969); however, her work has been exhibited not only in Canada, but also in the United States and Europe.

Today, Nell Tenhaaf lives in Trent Hills, Ontario and is Professor Emeritus in the Visual Arts and Computational Arts departments of York University.

== Practice ==
Tenhaaf writes and makes art on subjects related to science, biotechnology and artificial life. Her practice also focuses on gender issues regarding electronic media and computer technologies as well as science exploration through art practice, keeping even the feminist works within the scientific realm in order to incorporate female origin stories while agitating the rational locus of science. Tenhaaf includes in her work aspects that may contradict each other such as mythology, genetics, biotechnology and even religious iconography, believing that the power of art lies in the interaction between the artist, who is present in a work, and an individual viewer. In order to help the viewer identify with the work, Tenhaaf often includes the material presence of a body in her pieces. In addition to this, Tenhaaf makes sure to keep the notion of agency present in her practice while also addressing ethics.

== Notable works ==
The key connection between the artist’s current practice and her early database work is information. Despite originally being trained in painting, in the early 1980s Tenhaaf was determined to get permission from Canadian Department of Communications (DOC) to take part in the Telidon Vista field trials supported by Bell, in Toronto and Montreal. Artists were experimenting with the new "videotex" technology for creating computer graphics in the form of image and text, making content for testing the videotex protocol and the telecommunication networks that gave public access to the databases. It interested Tenhaaf to create alternative content for an emerging technology that was hoped to have a wide commercial appreciation. Given the opportunity, she created the database Us and/or Them (1983) which was a digital collection of text, maps, graphic design as well as images of Cold War found in various information sources such as magazines, newspapers and even United Nations reports, all of which were presented with manipulated digital graphics. This project introduced a correlation between Boolean concept of “and/or” and the harsh us vs them Cold War attitude. By combining information from both the United States and the Soviet Union origins, the controversial aspect of blame was opened. Later, Tenhaaf recreated the project as an independent show; however, until then initial Us and/or Them (1983) was accessible exclusively online at publicly available videotex terminals. This DOC-sponsored artist project was so significant due to its status as the first example of art about data realm.

The commercial project Telidon failed in mid-eighties, and at the same time Tenhaaf decided to redirect her practice closer to her starting medium (painting). She was still extremely interested in technological innovations, but at the time exploring only that in the artistic sphere seemed quite limited. The artist continued to include electronic technologies in her work integrating them with more traditional media such as painting and charcoal drawing. The exhibition ...believable, if not always true (1987) explored a concept of galleries and museums as archives of politically-focused information about economics of both liberalism and capitalism. The installation combined aspects of Egyptian art with popular culture innuendos in a form of bright pinks and greys. In addition to this, Tenhaaf played with the idea of placing contradictory cliches on computer screens within the space that both engaged the viewers and left them wondering about the lack of epistemological certainty. The mixture of information, technology, graphics, conundrums and mock architecture erased the conventional detachment of faith and truth, mythology and science. The artist herself explained the installation as “an interactive encounter with received ideas intended to seduce through a sense of the familiar, and yet introduce a conceptual space for resistance to acquired knowledge.” She elaborated that in this era of technological advancements that allow us to store unlimited amounts of information, the concept of knowledge become controversial. Ironically, despite our tremendous attraction to online databases and digitally-enhanced images, we are still drawn to a familiar past, hence why she choose to include sacred cow and Egyptian-esque architecture exhibiting that beliefs are a foundation to all modern innovations. Consequently, Tenhaaf explored scientific technological discourse and the absence of female form in it by familiarizing viewers to the matriarchal presence in Egyptian culture. In that database, the artist explained the importance of the Cycladic goddess, information on which was taken from the Ramses exhibition conveniently that was taking place in Montreal, Quebec at the time.

Species Life (1989) characterized the shift from information technology to biological technology in Tenhaaf’s practice. She played with the binary objections on gender by presenting digitally rectangular light boxes depicting conventions of gender roles through digitally enhanced images (T frame capture and manipulation): a man and a woman looking at a picturesque sunset with a pink and blue strings of DNA spinning around them; texts from the writings of Friedrich Nietzsche and Luce Irigaray (hand-printed yet still computer-processed) climbing up the fine threads of the double helix where Irigaray’s portion was positioned to identify female position, and consequently, accentuate the role of the mother in reproduction and modern society in general while Nietzsche’s piece took place of a male position of power. By intermingling the traditional aspect of heterosexual coupling with iconic texts of influential philosophers, Tenhaaf presented a conceptual way of describing the DNA double helix exploring the connection between romantic trope of mating and procreation and scientific discovery and its control over the reproduction. Tenhaaf’s work on biotechnology reminds us that biology itself has its history, suggesting that our contemporary concepts of biological destiny in both religious and scientific senses depends majorly on beliefs that include displacement of women from a liable position. By including images of Virgin Mary and Christ in Vitro (1991) and references to the myth of Oedipus in horror autotoxicus (1992) and combining the religious ideas with scientific notions, Tenhaaf urged the viewers to realize that science doesn’t banish patriarchal ways of thinking, but on the contrary can reinforces their power and authority.

In 1993 Nell Tenhaaf introduced her own body in her work. “I’m in a sequence of thought where the self is metaphorized. I’m engaged in my own form of experimental science, bound up with its vocabulary and imaging technologies.” (Nell Tenhaaf) Oedipal Ounce of Prevention (1993) and The solitary begets herself, keeping all eight cells (1993) were the first 2 works where the artist chose to exhibit her own human form, the former being an installation of lightboxes with the images of pierced Oedipus’ ankles and protein molecules (to reference human flesh) that hung next to images of Tenhaaf’s body presented with different medical instruments in front of it. The latter work was exhibited as a narrow 12 foot long self-portrait (exactly twice as long as the artist’s body). Both of these works reflected Tenhaaf’s fantasy of controlling her own arbitration within the scientific and cultural discourse of reproduction, proposing a conversation about women’s choice to remove or leave the 2 cells that are believed to be unnecessary in creating a complete human being, despite no ground knowledge on the subject.

== Influences ==
- Luce Irigaray
- Erwin Schrödinger "What Is Life"
- Manuel De Landa "A Thousand Years Of Nonlinear History"
- Evelyn Fox Keller "Refiguring Life"
- Marcel Duchamp
- John Von Neumann
- Stuart Kauffman
- Friedrich Nietzsche

== List of works ==
- ...believable if not always true, 1987
- Species Life, 1989
- In Vitro (the perfect wound), 1991
- horror autotoxicus, 1992
- Homunculus, 1993
- Oedipal Ounce of Prevention, 1993
- The solitary begets herself, keeping all eight cells, 1993
- Apparatus for Self-Organization, 1995
- Expression of Humours and Four-Cell Stage, 1995
- Fit, 1995
- Orphaned Life-Form, 1995
- UCBM (you could be me), 1999
- dDNA (d is for dancing), 1999
- Swell, 2003
- Flo'nGlo, 2005
- Push/Pull, 2009
- WinWin, 2012

== Exhibitions ==
=== Solo ===
2018

Push/Pull: an excitable sculpture, live demo with EEG sonification at LIVELab, McMaster University /Hamilton, ON

2012

WinWin, Paul Petro Contemporary Art /Toronto, ON

2008

Homeostatic, Tom Thomson Art Gallery /Owen Sound, ON

2007

Fit/Unfit: A Survey Exhibition, Art Gallery of Hamilton /Hamilton, ON

2005

Flo'nGlo, Paul Petro Contemporary Art (in Images Festival) /Toronto, ON

2004

Fit/Unfit: A Survey Exhibition, The Canadian Museum of Contemporary Photography /Ottawa, ON and Leonard and Bina Ellen Gallery, Concordia University /Montreal, QC

2003

Fit/Unfit: A Survey Exhibition, The Robert McLaughlin Gallery /Oshawa, ON

2002

dDNA (d is for dancing) Paul Petro Contemporary Art (in flow, Images Festival of Independent Film & Video) /Toronto, ON

2000

The Empathy Sessions, photographs and lightboxes at Paul Petro Contemporary Art /Toronto, ON

UCBM (You could be me), Western Front, interactive installation in Zero Degree Monstrosities event /Vancouver, BC

1999

dDNA (d is for dancing), storefront video projection developed on-site, MediaArts /St. Louis, MO

UCBM (You could be me), interactive installation at Paul Petro Contemporary Art /Toronto, ON

1997

Neonudism, InterAccess Electronic Media Centre /Toronto, ON

1995

Recent works, Galerie Samuel Lallouz: lightboxes, c-prints /Montreal, QC

1993

Recent works, Galerie Lallouz + Watterson /Montreal, QC

1992

In Vitro (the perfect wound), Galerie Samuel Lallouz: lightboxes /Montreal, QC

Horror autotoxicus, Axe N o 7: videodisc installation /Hull, QC

1990

Horror autotoxicus, Western Front Gallery /Vancouver, BC

1988

Gramatica, Galerie Oboro: slide projection installation /Montreal, QC

1987

Believable if not always true..., A.R.C. Gallery: installation /Toronto, ON

Believable if not always true..., Galerie J. Yahouda-Meir /Montreal, QC

1985

Silence is a Monument, Galerie Powerhouse: constructions /Montreal, QC

1982

She was a perfect recluse, Eye Level Gallery: xerography /Halifax, NS

1980

Galerie Powerhouse, drawings /Montreal, QC

1979

Galerie Powerhouse: constructions /Montreal, QC

1977

Grandes illusions, Galerie Powerhouse: drawings /Montreal, QC

=== Collaborations ===
2013

NSF (nous sommes fragiles) – Nell Tenhaaf with John Kamevaar, audio/video performance in The Box Salon at the Rivoli /Toronto, ON

2001

Quick Fix with Derrick Hodgson, Paul Petro Contemporary Art /Toronto, ON

1996

Myths From Cyberspace, with Sylvie B langer, Koffler Gallery /Toronto, ON

1995

50 ml. of Pittsburgh Air, Pittsburgh Center for the Arts, CMU art faculty exhibit, collaboration with Steve Kurtz /Pittsburgh, PA

1994

Nell Tenhaaf/Blair Robins, Glendon Gallery /Toronto, ON

1990

There's a mirror/ear at the end of my bed, SAW Gallery "Touch That Dial", collaboration with Kim Sawchuk /Ottawa, ON

1985

Filiation, mother-daughter show at Galerie Powerhouse, collaboration with Kay Tenhaaf /Montreal, QC

=== Selected group shows ===
2010

thelivingeffect, Ottawa Art Gallery: Push/Pull /Ottawa, ON

2007

Bios 4, CAAC (Centro Andaluz de Arte Contempor neo) /Sevilla, ES

2005

This Must Be The Place, Interaccess Gallery with Vera Frenkel, David Rokeby, Nell Tenhaaf, Norman White /Toronto, ON

2003

The Bigger Picture, Ottawa Art Gallery /Ottawa, ON

2003

Complexity, Samuel Dorsky Museum, SUNY /New Paltz, NY and Federal Reserve Board /Washington, DC

2002

Digitized Bodies, Mestna Galerija /Ljubljana, SI

2001

Digitized Bodies, Ludwig Museum /Budapest, HU

2000

Intimate Perceptions, Interaccess and Zsa Zsa /Toronto, ON

Odd Bodies, Oakville Galleries /Oakville, ON

Dream Ecology, The Koffler Gallery /Toronto, ON and The Robert McLaughlin Gallery /Oshawa, ON

1999

Contemporary galleries, The solitary begets herself, keeping all eight cells, Art Gallery of Ontario /Toronto, ON

Choice, three Canadian artists at Enkehuset Gallery /Stockholm, SE and Gallery Astly, Skinnskatteberg: UCBM

The Body In Question, Salina Art Center /Salina, KS and KRATES Kansas touring art service circulating show

1998

Digital Documentary: The Need to Know and the Urge to Show, Walker Art Center /Minneapolis, MN

Art & Science: Selected Works, Foster Gallery /Baton Rouge, LA

Interface: Encounters with New Technology, Canadian Museum of Contemporary Photography /Ottawa, ON

1997

LikeLife, Brighton Media Centre /Brighton, UK

Promises of Monsters, Rockville Arts Place /Rockville, MD

Techno-seduction, The Cooper Union /New York, NY

1996–97

Odd Bodies/Corps trangers, National Gallery of Canada /Ottawa, ON

1996

Dessins et maquettes de sculpteurs, Galerie Samuel Lallouz /Montreal, QC

1995

Que sont les pionni res devenues?: Centre Copie-Art - Galerie Arts Technologiques, with ISEA95 /Montreal, QC

1994

Le corps: Kunsthalle Bielefeld: The solitary begets herself... /Bielefeld, DE

and Haus am Waldsee /Berlin, DE

Le b n fice du doute: Le Sous-sol/Paris, FR

Frankenstein: Macdonald Stewart Art Centre /Guelph, ON

Arte Virtual: 12 Protuestas de Arte Reactivo: Horror autotoxicus /Madrid, ES

De Causis et Tractatibus, Axe N o 7 Art Contemporain /Hull, QC

1993

Le b n fice du doute: Optica /Montreal, QC

Body-guard: London Regional Art Gallery /London, ON

Angles of Incidence: The Banff Centre for the Arts /Banff, AB

1992

Les Cent jours d'art contemporain, Vues d'ensemble /Montreal, QC

1991–92

Other Frontiers: Species Life, Third Eye Centre /Glasgow, UK; Canada House /London, UK; and Centre Culturel Canadien /Paris, FR

1989–91

Legitimation: Species Life, Galerie Powerhouse /Montreal, QC; Contemporary Art Gallery /Vancouver, BC; Nickle Arts Museum /Calgary, AB; London Regional Art Gallery /London, ON; and Vu /Quebec, QC

1988

Le Dessin Errant, Dalhousie Art Gallery /Halifax; Concordia Art Gallery /Montreal, QC and Musee du Quebec /Quebec, QC

1987

Siting Technology: The Walter Phillips Gallery /Banff, NS and Mackenzie Art Gallery /Regina, SK

1986

Women in Adverticity (Eye Revue): Union Station /Toronto, ON

1985

Art is Communications: A Space /Toronto, ON and Centre for Art Tapes /Halifax, NS

Pictures of Democracy: Video Cabaret (videotex) /Toronto, ON

Digicon 85: Arts, Sciences and Technology Centre /Toronto, ON

Collection Pret d'Oeuvres d'art: Musee du Quebec /Quebec, QC

1984

TVOntario broadcast: BETA videotex magazine /Toronto, ON

Anti-Nuke Show: Galerie Powerhouse (touring) /Montreal, QC

The Artist as a Young Machine: Ontario Science Centre /Toronto, ON

Artists talk about technology: ANNPAC Conference /Halifax, NSFeministe toi-meme, feministe quand meme, La Chambre Blanche /Quebec, QC

== Publications ==
- With Melanie Baljko, "Sensory, sonic and symbolic features of a collaborative media art practice" in Canadian Journal of Communication, Vol. 37, No. 1, 2012, pp. 109–119.
- With Melanie Baljko, "The Aesthetics of Emergence: Co-constructed Interactions" in ACM Transactions on Human-Computer Interaction (TOCHI – Special Double Issue on the Aesthetics of Interaction), Vol. 15, Issue 3, November 2008, pp. 11: 1–27.
- "Art Embodies A-Life: The VIDA Competition" in Leonardo, Vol. 41, No. 1, 2008, pp. 6–15.
- "Where Surfaces Meet: Interviews with Stuart Kauffman, Claus Emmeche and Arantza Etxeberria" in Leonardo, Vol. 34, No. 2, 2001, pp. 115–120.
- "As Art is Lifelike: Evolution, Art, and The Readymade" in Leonardo, Vol. 31, No. 5, 1998, pp. 397–404.
- "Pandora Re-visited: Art and New Technologies" in Journal of Architectural Education, Washington, D.C., Summer, 1987, pp. 18–23.
