= Lisa Steele =

Canadian artist (born 1947)

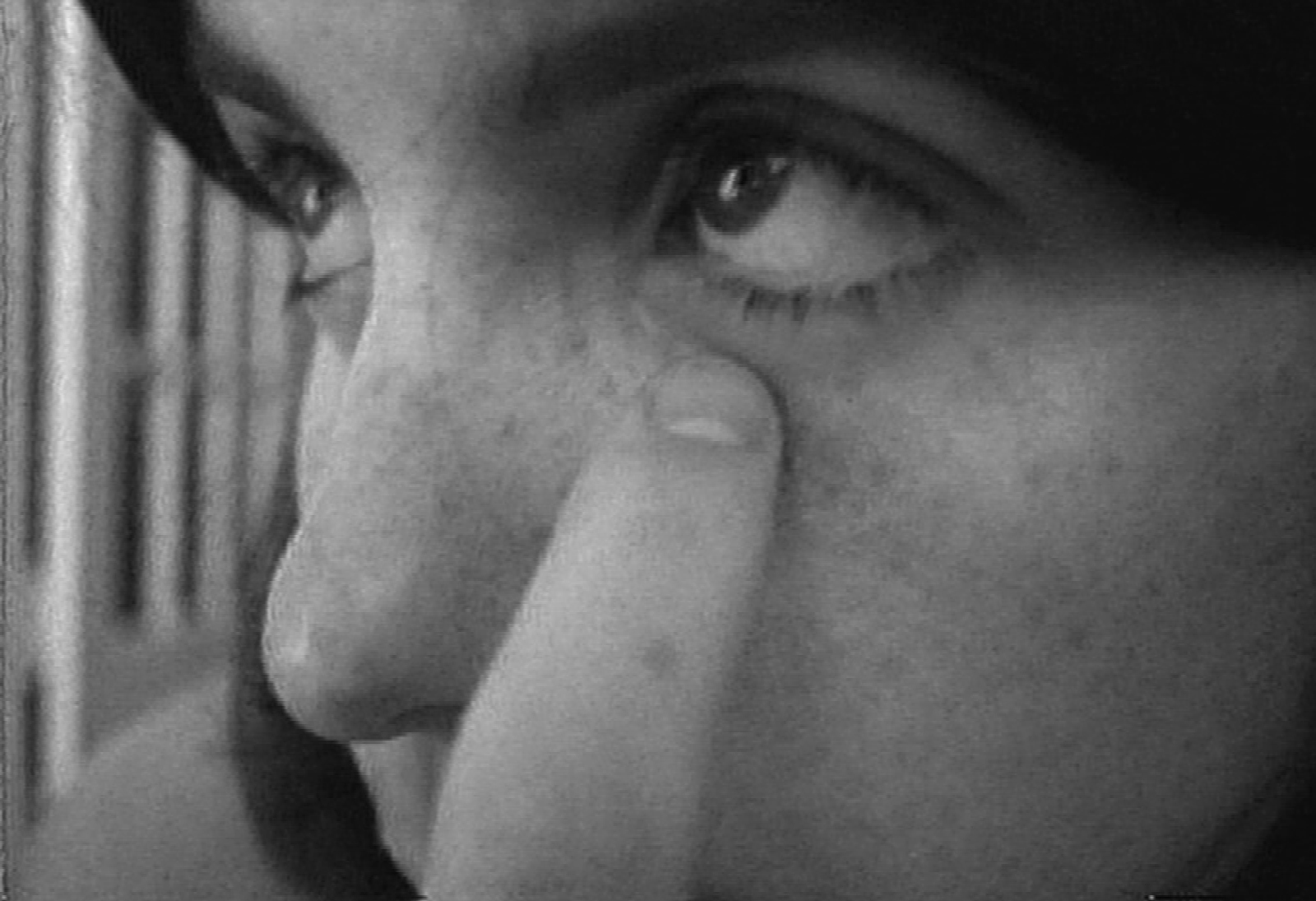
- Birthday Suit – with scars and defects, 1974, b/w videotape, 12 minutes on betacam Sp cassette
- Born: 1947 (age 77–78); Kansas City, Missouri
- Known for: video art
- Notable work: Birthday Suit – with scars and defects, 1974 The Blood Records, written and annotated, 1997 (with Kim Tomczak)
- Awards: 2005 Governor General's Award for Visual and Media Art (with Kim Tomczak) 1993 Bell Canada Award for Video Art (with Kim Tomczak) 1993 Peter Herrndorf Media Arts Award (with Kim Tomczak)

Lisa Steele (born 1947) is a Canadian artist, a pioneer in video art, educator, curator and co-founder of Vtape in Toronto. Born in the United States, Steele moved to Canada in 1968 and is now a Canadian citizen. She has collaborated exclusively with her partner Kim Tomczak since the early 1980s.

== Early life ==
Steele was born in Kansas City, Missouri in 1947 and immigrated to Canada in 1968. Her brother, James B. Steele, is a Pulitzer Prize winning journalist located in Philadelphia.

== Career ==
An important pioneer of video art in Canada since the early 1970s, Steele has shown internationally at the Venice Biennale (1980), the Kunsthalle Basel, the Museum of Modern Art (NYC), the National Gallery of Canada, the Institute of Contemporary Art (Boston), 49th Parallel Videoseries, the Vancouver Art Gallery and the Long Beach Museum. She is a founding director of Vtape in Toronto, a national information and distribution service for independent video and a founding publisher and editor of FUSE Magazine.

=== Early work ===
Steele's best known early work Birthday Suit – with scars and defects (1974) is a thirteen-minute black and white video tape where she "presents her naked body to the unblinking gaze of the camera". The tape itself is characterized by common practices of early video art, unedited with a static shot. Steele turns the camera on, walks to the end of the room/set and removes her clothing. She approaches the camera and begins to examine the various scars she's accumulated over her life up to that point. The work represents what critic Dot Tuer indicates is "an offering to the technological gaze [which] downplays the representation of the body as a gendered subject," and as film historian Catherine Russell points out, the work is a "counter-image to the emergent critique of the female body in narrative cinema." Steele's description of the work:

On the occasion of my 27th birthday I decided to do a tape that chronicled my passage through time. I have always been clumsy, tripping, dropping, falling with alarming regularity. This tape accepts the extent of the consequences.

Birthday Suit – with scars and defects was included in a notable touring exhibition in 1989–1990 titled Rebel Girls: A Survey of Canadian Feminist Videotapes 1974-1988.

A Very Personal Story (1974) is a videotape which acts as a metaphor to Steele's childhood experience of discovering her mother's dead body at the age of 15. The Globe and Mail described "A Very Personal Story" as an "exquisitely intimate work, recounting the day of her loss."

The Ballad of Dan Peoples (1976) is a videotape in which Steele holds a photograph of an old man while sitting upon a stool. She then narrates stories of her grandfather's rural childhood in his voice, taking on his characteristics and personality. Her grandfather's memories and identity reveal parts of her own identity; the closing credits acknowledge her grandfather's recent move to a home for the aged also speaks to the familial and self-reflective conditions which inspired this work.

In 1976, Steele employed fellow video artist Colin Campbell to create the four-part drama The Scientist Tapes, which overlays cultural anxieties about scientific change with details about their long distance desire for one another. The video series ends with the two characters drifting off into space, finally together.

Between 1974 and 1986, Steele developed character-based micro-dramas, drawing from her experiences working at the Toronto women and children's shelter Interval House. In The Damages (1977), Makin' Strange (1978), Talking Tongues (1982) and The Gloria Tapes, Steele inhabits the characters of Mrs. Pauly, Beatrice Small, and Gloria.

=== Steele and Tomczak ===
Since the early 1980s, Steele has worked exclusively in collaboration with Kim Tomczak. Their individual and collaborative work was the subject of a major survey exhibition at the Art Gallery of Ontario in 1989–1990. In 1993, Steele and Tomczak were recognized with two awards: the Bell Canada Award for excellence in the field of Canadian video art and a Toronto Arts Award (the Peter Herndorf Media Arts Award). In 1996, their work The Blood Records: written and annotated, received a world premiere at the Museum of Modern Art in New York. Their installation work We're Getting Younger All the Time has been installed in several locations in England, in Venice and was at the Centre d'art Contemporain in Basse-Normandie in November 2002. In 2005, Steele and Tomczak won the Governor General's Award in Visual and Media Arts. In 2009, Steele and Tomczak were recognized with honorary doctorate degrees from the University of British Columbia (Okanagan) In 2016, Wanda Nanibush, then a new curator at the Art Gallery of Ontario referred to Steele as an ongoing significant contributor to the Toronto new media scene. Steele is a professor emeritus at the University of Toronto John H. Daniels Faculty of Architecture, Landscape and Design.

== Awards ==
Steele received the Long Haul Award for lifetime achievement at the Untitled Art Awards reception in Toronto, February, 2005. In 2005, she and Kim Tomczak were jointly awarded a Governor General's Award in Visual and Media Arts.

== Permanent collections ==
Her videos are in collections worldwide, including The National Gallery of Canada, the Art Gallery of Ontario, the Museum of Contemporary Art (Houston, Texas), Ingrid Oppenheim, Concordia University (Montreal), Newcastle Polytechnic (England), Paulo Cardazzo (Milan), the Canadian Embassy (Tokyo) and the Akademie der Kunst (Berlin).

== Personal life ==
Steele is a breast cancer survivor.

== Works ==
=== Select videography ===
- Birthday Suit – with scars and defects (1974)
- A Very Personal Story (1974)
- The Ballad Of Dan Peoples (1976)
- The Damages (1977)
- Makin' Strange (1978)
- Talking Tongues(1982)
- The Gloria Tapes (1980)

with Kim Tomczak:

- Working The Double Shift (1984)
- Legal Memory (1992)
- The Blood Records: written and annotated (1997)
- We're Getting Younger All The Time (2001)
- Make Love Not War (2003)
- Practicing Death (2003)
- Free Speech (2006)
- Speak City (2009)
