= Kim Tomczak =

Canadian artist (born 1952)

- Born: 1952 (age 72–73); Victoria, British Columbia, Canada
- Spouse: Lisa Steele
- Awards: 2005 Governor General's Award for Visual and Media art (with Lisa Steele)
- Website: http://www.steeleandtomczak.com/

Kim Tomczak (born 1952) is a Canadian artist known for his work in performance art, photography and video art. Born in Victoria, British Columbia in 1952, he graduated from the Vancouver School of Art (now the Emily Carr Institute of Art & Design) in 1975. Tomczak has collaborated exclusively with his partner Lisa Steele since the early 1980s.

== Work ==
Tomczak's work has been shown at the Paris Biennale, the Canadian Cultural Centre in Paris, the Video Biennale in Vienna (where he received first prize for a tape co-produced with Lisa Steele) as well as the Montreal Museum of Fine Arts, Documenta 8 in Kasel, Germany, and the Centre Georges Pompidou in Paris. His work is in many collections including: the National Gallery of Canada, the Art Gallery of Ontario, the Vancouver Art Gallery, the Institute of Contemporary Art in Boston and the Oakville Galleries.

Tomczak is a co-founder of Vtape, a Toronto media arts resource centre.

Tomczak is a professor at University of Toronto's John H. Daniels Faculty of Architecture, Landscape and Design.

== Steele and Tomczak ==
Since the early 1980s Tomczak has worked exclusively in collaboration with Lisa Steele. Their individual and collaborative work was the subject of a major survey exhibition at the Art Gallery of Ontario in 1989–90. In 1993, Steele and Tomczak were recognized with two awards: the Bell Canada Award for excellence in the field of Canadian video art and a Toronto Arts Award (the Peter Herndorf Media Arts Award). In 1996, their work The Blood Records: written and annotated, received a world premiere at the Museum of Modern Art in New York. Their installation work We're Getting Younger All the Time has been installed in several locations in England, in Venice and was at the Fonds régional d'art contemporain Basse-Normandie in November 2002. In 2005, Steele and Tomczak won the Governor General's Award in Visual and Media Arts. In 2009, Steele and Tomczak were recognized with honorary doctorate degrees from the University of British Columbia (Okanagan)

== References and further reading ==
- Ardenne, Paul. Lisa Steele, Kim Tomczak: Before I Wake. Paris: Centre culturel canadien, 2003.
- Ghaznavi, Corinna. "Lisa Steele and Kim Tomczak." Canadian Art 17.4 (2000): 68.
- Monk, Philip. 4 hours and 38 minutes: Videotapes by Lisa Steele and Kim Tomczak. Toronto: Art Gallery of Ontario, 1989.
- Russell, Catherine. "The Lisa Steele Tapes: Investigation and Vision." North of Everything: English-Canadian Cinema Since 1980. William Beard and Jerry White, eds. Edmonton: University of Alberta, 2002. ISBN 0-88864-390-X
- Steele, Lisa and Kim Tomczak. The Blood Records: written and annotated. Oakville: Oakville Galleries, 1999.
