= They Will All Die in Space =

- Film poster
- Directed by: Javier Chillon
- Written by: Javier Chillon
- Produced by: Javier Chillon; Luis Fuentes (associate producer)
- Starring: Francesc Garrido; Julio Perillán; Ben Temple
- Cinematography: Luis Fuentes
- Edited by: Javier Chillon; Luis Fuentes
- Music by: Cirilo Fernández
- Production companies: Misterio; Behind the Movies; Morituri
- Distributed by: Unstable Ground (North America) (Galaxy of Horrors)
- Release date: 25 June 2015 (Fantafestival)
- Running time: 15 minutes
- Country: Spain
- Language: English
- Budget: €20,000 (estimated)

They Will All Die in Space (Spanish:Morirán en el espacio or Ellos morirán en el espacio) is a 2015 English-language Spanish short science-fiction horror film written, directed and produced by Javier Chillon, about a starship technician (Julio Perillán) . Chillon's third short film was shown at well over 300 film festivals between 2015 and the end of 2019, and has won approximately sixty awards and honours, including Best Short Film from the 2015 Sitges Film Festival, the most important fantastic film festival in Spain.

In 2017, They Will All Die in Space received a general theatrical release through its inclusion in the Canadian science-fiction horror anthology film, Galaxy of Horrors.

== Cast ==
- Francesc Garrido as Dan Atenas
- Julio Perillán as Alex Talabot
- Ben Temple as Phil Eberhart

== Production ==
=== Development and support ===
Chillon worked on the film for four years (from script writing to filming was three years), keeping costs down by borrowing space and equipment from his associate producers: a sound stage belonging to Behind the Movies, and a RED camera from Morituri.

=== Design, effects, and filming ===
The set was built to minimize the need for CGI, but also for aesthetic reasons related to his influences. Most of the visual effects are old-fashioned models made with the help of José Luis Orive (called "Rambo") to create different spaces on the ship; the relatively little CGI was done by User T38, integrating, creating the astronaut in 3D, the spacecraft, and so on.

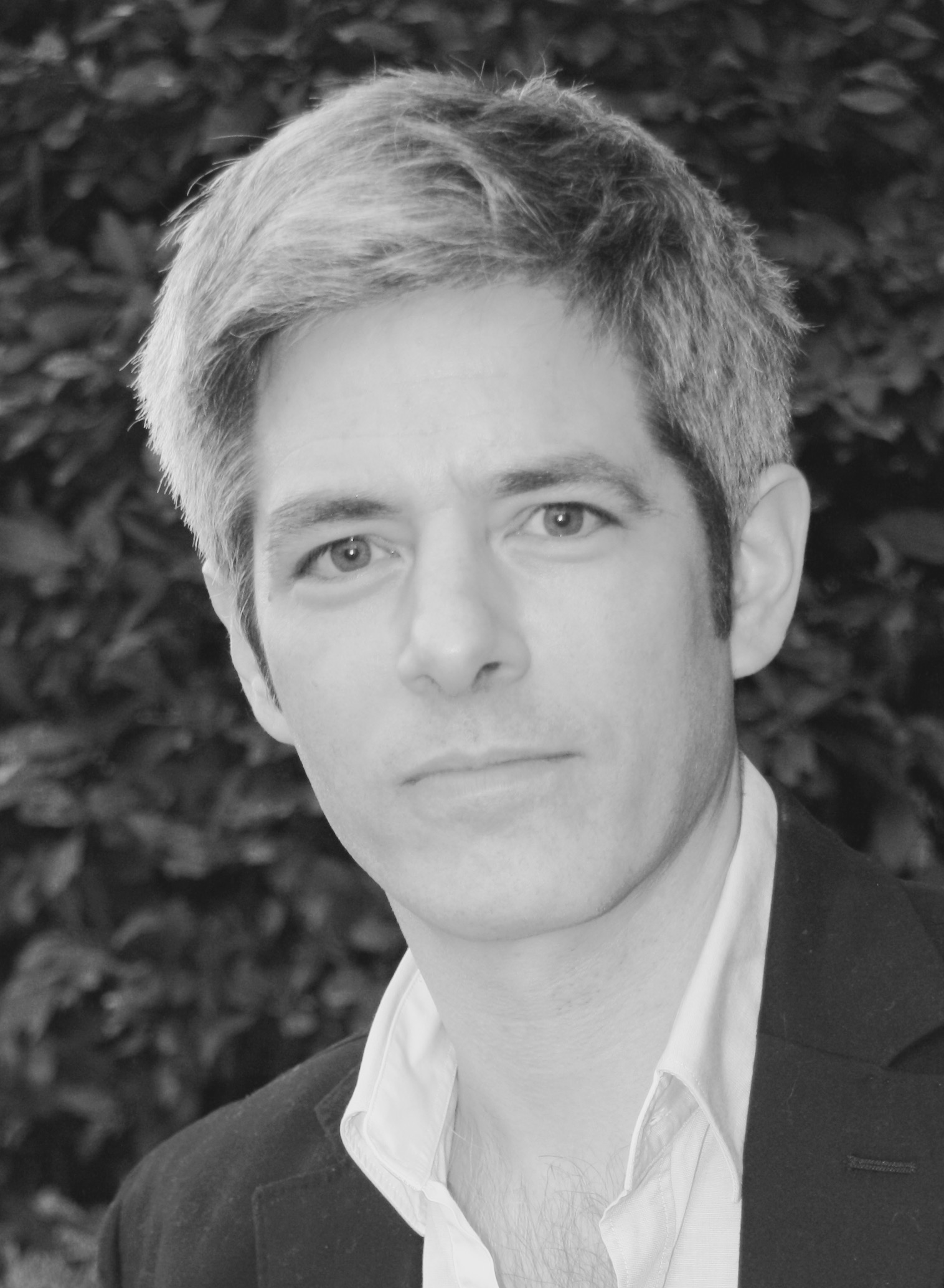
Julio Perillán

Chillon said the three actors, Francesc Garrido, Julio Perillán and Ben Temple, understood their roles and the tone of the story perfectly. Chillon and his director of photography, Luis Fuentes, thought the film a mixture of science fiction and thriller, and decided to shoot the film in black and white.

== Release ==
They Will All Die in Space had its premiere at the 35th Fantafestival in Rome on 25 June 2015. In less than two years, the short had been selected for nearly 300 film festivals worldwide, where it received much praise. By March 2019, the short had been shown at 336 festivals.

=== Anthology film ===
They Will All Die in Space is included in the 2017 Canadian science-fiction horror anthology film Galaxy of Horrors, which comprises eight shorts within a larger narrative frame in which a man awakens from a cryogenic sleep pod and is forced to watch the shorts as entertainment while his damaged life-support runs out. The anthology film had its premiere in Toronto at Imagine Cinemas Carlton on 1 March 2017. the feature was conceived by Little Terrors short films festival founder Justin McConnell, who directed the narrative frame, and Indiecan Entertainment's Avi Federgreen. The production is the second collaboration between Rue Morgue Cinema and Little Terrors, following Minutes Past Midnight.

=== Home media and streaming ===
The film is available to view on Vimeo in its entirety, and is a Vimeo Staff Pick.

The Galaxy of Horrors anthology was released on DVD and special edition Blu-ray in 2017. The anthology was made available through various video on demand options on the IndieCan Entertainment website, on 7 March 2017, and on Amazon Prime.

== Reception ==
=== Critical response ===
They Will All Die in Space made Shawn Herbert's top ten list of "life changing short films" in 2018, saying it was "an interesting watch, especially for those who enjoy having goosebumps!" Peter Martin called the film an "extremely well-crafted film", while Terek Puckett said "Chillon delivers a great piece of space horror with a grim tone reminiscent of many American science fiction feature films of the early 1970s." Richard Sopko concurred, and averred: "It's well acted so there's an immediate engagement with the characters." Carl Fisher compared the claustrophobic feel to Alien and considered the film the best of the eight in the Canadian anthology. Jeff Spry, writing for Syfy Wire, called it "an exceptional example of the short film form, filled with fluid camerawork", actors who are "invested in the material," brooding music, and "an unappetizing twist on a familiar trope in outer-space movies"; a film "gorgeous to watch, even when the horrifying mystery unfolds". Andrew Liptak said it "ends with a neat twist that pays off exceptionally well." Cheryl Eddy of io9 enjoyed the "crisp black-and-white" and "sinister new spin" on the otherwise familiar story of a space ship filled with humans slumbering in cryogenic chambers encounters catastrophic troubles in deep space. Joseph Perry praised all elements of the film.

Alisha Bunting praises the cinematography, sound design, and the acting, which "matched the film", wishing there had been a bit more shown of the two waking crew interacting while the protagonist is in cryogenesis, and hoped the short would be converted into a feature.

=== Accolades ===
Awards or special mentions earned by the film include:

2015

Awards

- Sitges • Best Short Film
- Cartagena • Best Short Film (Premio Carabela de Plata 'Ciudad de Cartagena', €3000)
- CortoLovere (Lovere) • Best Foreign Short Film
- Cine Corto de Tapiales (Tapiales) • Best Foreign Short Film
- Acocollona't (Girona) • Second Best Short Film
- Maratón de cine fantástico de Sants (Sants) • Best Short Film
- Algeciras Fantástika (Algeciras) • Best Short Film
- Fotofilm Navàs (Navàs) • Best Short Film
- Festival "ConSecuencias" (Spain) • Best Short Film
- Golden Knight Malta International Short (Malta) • Best Short Film

2016

Awards

- La Vieja Encina (San Nicolás del Puerto) • Best Short Film
- Toma Corto (Tomares) • Best Sound
- CometCon (Live Action) (Oviedo) • Best Short Film
- Fright Night Theatre (Hamilton, Ontario) • Best Sci-fi Short Film
- Rewind (Barcelona) • Best Sci-fi Short Film • Best Director
- FanTer (Cáceres, Spain) • Best Short Film
- FiPiLi Horror (Livorno) • Best Sci-fi Short Film
- Festival de Cine de Sant Joan d'Alacant (Alicante) • Silver Ficus, Best Director
- End of Days (Orlando, Florida) • Best Screenplay
- Sci-On! International (Reno, Nevada) • Best Space Travel Film
- Fort Worth Bizarre (Fort Worth) • Best Foreign Short Film
- Kimera International (Molise area, Italy) • Best Short Film (Jury)
- Snake Alley (Burlington, Iowa) • Best Sci-fi Short Film
- Cortometrajes de Terror y Fantástico (Barcelona) • Best Director
- Cryptshow (Barcelona) • Best Cinematography (Luis Fuentes
- Latronic Horror (Latronico) • Best Short Film
- Ballston Spa (Ballston Spa, New York) • Best Screenplay
- Terror en El Castillo (Arroyo de la Luz) • Best Short Film
- Festival Alhama Ciudad de Cine (Alhama de Granada) • Best Director
- Hellfire (Folkestone) • Best Short Film
- Revolution Me (Brooklyn) • Best Sci-fi/Horror Short Film • Best Special Effects
- IndieCrete (Crete) • Best Sci-fi Short Film
- GenreBlast • Best Short Film
- Rivne International - Dream City (Rivne) • Third Best Short Film
- StarGate Galactic (Wadsworth, Texas) • Best Sci-Fi/Suspense Short Film
- FanCine de Lemos (Monforte de Lemos) • Best Short Film (€800)
- Cinestrange (Braunschweig) • Best Short Film
- Fangofest (Amposta) • Best Sci-fi Short Film
- Fantástico Mar del Plata (Mar del Plata) • Best Sci-fi Short Film • Best Director • Best Script
- Cervignano (Cervignano) • Best Cinematography • Best Production Design (Idoia Esteban)
- Hot Shorts (London) • Best Production Design (Idoia Esteban) • Best Set Design (Jose Luis Drive) • Best Costume Runner Up (Clara Bilbao) Best Screenplay Joint 2nd Place
- National Irish Science Fiction Convention (Dublin) • Silver Blaster Audience Award
- Apocalypse Later International Fantastic (Phoenix) • Audience Award
- Suspiria (Alicante) • Audience Award (Terror)
- Steam House Entertainment Independent (Los Angeles) • Best Short Film • Best Sci-fi Short Film • Honorable Mention
- Certamen Audiovisual Roberto Di Chiara (Florencio Varela) • Best Short Film
- Peligros (Peligros) • Youth Jury Award
- CollFantasy (El Coll) • Best Sci-fi Short Film
- Amarcort (Rimini) • Youth Jury Award
- Weird Shots (Palma de Mallorca) • Best Short Film
- Image In Cabestany (Cabestany) • International Audience Award (€200)
- DRAFT (Derry, New Hampshire) • Best Thriller Short Film
- Pop Ninja Shortsfest (Lake Charles, Louisiana • Best Short Film
- Poe Fantastic, (Brazil) • Best Sound

Special mentions

- Fanta Elx (Elche)
- Borgo in Corto (Borgo San Dalmazzo)
- Artfools (Larissa, Greece)
- Obuxo (Javierrelatre)
