= You Are Here (2010 film) =

- Film poster
- Directed by: Daniel Cockburn
- Written by: Daniel Cockburn
- Produced by: Daniel Cockburn; Daniel Bekerman
- Starring: Tracy Wright; R.D. Reid; Anand Rajaram; Nadia Litz
- Cinematography: Cabot McNenly
- Edited by: Duff Smith
- Music by: Rick Hyslop
- Production companies: ZeroFunction Productions, Scythia Films
- Distributed by: Pacific Northwest Pictures
- Release dates: 10 August 2010 (Locarno); 15 September 2010 (TIFF)
- Running time: 78 minutes
- Country: Canada
- Language: English
- Budget: C$100,000 (Note: This figure is based on an off-the-cuff remark by Daniel Cockburn ("about a hundred thousand dollars"), presumed to be Canadian dollars, though he was speaking in Utrecht at the time.)

You Are Here is a 2010 Canadian philosophical speculative fiction film written and directed by video artist Daniel Cockburn, which he also co-produced with Daniel Bekerman. Cockburn's first feature film is "hyper-inventive and categorically hard-to-describe", initially billed as a "Borgesian fantasy" or a "meta-detective story", and later as "part experimental gallery film and part philosophical sketch comedy." In You Are Here, Cockburn makes use of the techniques and concepts he had honed over the previous decade as an experimental video artist with "a narrative bent", and "works them into a complex and unique cinematic structure." The film mainly follows a woman (Tracy Wright, who died of cancer seven weeks before the film was released) searching for the meaning behind a series of audiovisual documents from other universes, seemingly left purposefully for her to find, some of which are shown as vignettes concerning figures such as the Lecturer (R.D. Reid) and the Experimenter (Anand Rajaram) interspersed throughout the film. She finds so many of them that they fill a space which she calls the Archive, and herself its Archivist. In time, the Archive appears to resist her attempts at cataloguing and organizing it, and she receives a cell phone instead of the usual document, leading to a fateful encounter with others.

The film features music composed by Rick Hyslop and visual effects by Robert James Spurway, and makes use of excerpts from films by fellow Canadian filmmaker John Price. It has been presented at over forty film festivals worldwide, and compared to the works of Charlie Kaufman, Jorge Luis Borges, and Philip K. Dick. The film is a recipient of both the Jay Scott Prize in 2010, and the EMAF Award in 2011, and with few exceptions, has been received enthusiastically by critics.

== Plot ==
A lecturer discussing "the awareness of the self as a solitary construct" shines a red dot from a laser pointer on to a screen showing ocean waves crashing onto a shore. He instructs his audience not to follow the dot. The key, he says, is to somehow allow the pointer to act as a guide into the footage of the waves while simultaneously following one's own thought processes, one's own path.

Elsewhere, people call into an office with bright red threads strung across it, reporting their whereabouts to a team of trackers. One such person, or persons, is "a crowd of people named Alan", (Note: "Alan" is "a crowd of ethnically diverse men and women of varying ages", played by some two dozen (uncredited) actors in different shots. The "'crowd of people named Alan' who seem to collectively inhabit a single quotidian existence (even when that existence effectively comes to an end)" may be understood as a cipher. Even the viewer is named Alan: "You out there, the person reading this review? You're Alan, too: 'Your name is Alan, and you are on your way.'") described in a philosophical voiceover about getting taxis to random street corners whenever they are ordered to do so by the trackers. They also ponder a near-death experience, a forgotten password, and an ominous door located on the outer side of a high-rise.

An experimenter is seen in a room of his own devising, designed to be a model of an information processing unit, demonstrating that the mind inside need never understand any questions or commands, nor what is written in response, which is in Chinese, a language he cannot read but does learn to write, with a tool in the form of books of instruction, which permit him to give correct answers despite not understanding them either. After going through this experience, even after having left the room, he no longer believes he understands anything he hears or says.

A reclusive woman searches for the meaning behind a series of audiovisual documents that connect to alternate universes, including a tape of the Lecturer, who is later seen on the beach being bothered by a group of children whom he eventually turns into a new, albeit both frustrated and frustrating, audience—they bury him up to his head in the sand and train the laser pointer light on his head. In time, the woman finds so many items, they fill a room in her apartment and calls it the "archive", and herself its "archivist". One such document, in a voiceover by a child, tells the story of a celebrated inventor who secretly develops a red eye implant given to every person in his world; once activated, the eye shows only what he sees, so that when he is imprisoned for this, they share the view from his cell, effectively sharing his imprisonment.

The archive appears to resist the woman's attempts at cataloguing and organizing it. She receives a cell phone instead of the usual document. She makes a call and follows instructions until she encounters a pair of field agents, going from place to place in a taxi, reporting their whereabouts. They welcome her as one of their own. There is a car accident which kills Alan, who, even in death, continues to morph from one body to another. Alan holds a red ball in its hand, which the archivist takes and places in her archive, which she then locks up forever.

The final scene is from the viewpoint of a shelf in a room with a red ball on it. The room appears to begin to move in a rocking manner from side to side.

== Characters and cast ==
- The Archivist • Tracy Wright
- The Lecturer • R.D. Reid
- The Experimenter • Anand Rajaram
- The Assistant • Nadia Capone
- Voice of the Philosopher • Hardee T. Lineham
- The Trackers (Verna, Hal, Sharon, Bob) • Shannon Beckner, Richard Clarkin, Jenni Burk, Robert Kennedy
- The Field Agents (Marcie, Edgar) • Nadia Litz, Alec Stockwell
- Narrating Alan • Scott Anderson
- Alan in the stairwell • Emily Davidson-Niedoba
- The Children • Shae Norris, Rosie Elia, Isaac Durmford
- The Inventor • Peter Solala
- Child's voice • London Angelis

== Themes and interpretations ==
=== Anxiety about uncertainty in the digital age ===
Though it is never explicitly invoked, You Are Here is primarily about the Internet and the information society. At a festival question-and-answer session in Utrecht, Cockburn said the film comes from anxieties and feelings "that are very specific to the current digital age". In an interview with Adam Nayman, who notes that Cockburn's previous short pieces carry a recurrent theme of technophobia, Cockburn said he wanted to make a movie that expressed anxiety about a world where mapping and archiving the world is more substantial than the world itself: "Photography or video is already one step removed from reality. The second step away from reality is: how is it stored, how is it findable? There's the world, there's pictures of the world, and there's this multitude of search engines that you can use." The entry for the film on Vtape, Cockburn's usual distributor, quotes a blog review touching on these themes from the first sentence:

Do you suffer under the tyranny of Twitter? Is your life story written in status updates? Are your thoughts search engine optimized? When you picture the future, do you imagine Mark Zuckerberg's sneaker stomping on a human face—forever? If so, you may find comfort in You are Here.

In a similar vein, Cockburn, said the film is all about "location, or at least talking around the idea of location ... the non-specificity of place ... closely connected to the anxiety and uncertainty-of-selfhood that I hope is somewhere near the movie's heart."

=== Despair or hope ===
Cockburn has related how, at the 35th annual Toronto International Film Festival, in response to someone asking the actors what they thought the movie was about, most of the actors having just seen it for the first time, R.D. Reid said: "I think this film is about the attempt to deal with a deep-rooted despair", which surprised Cockburn, since they had not talked about it: "I was really gratified to hear him say that. I thought that is a very appropriate interpretation of the movie." In the same exchange, Cockburn also noted: "A couple of people have written about it being hopeful, which I'll accept." In his interview with Cockburn, Adam Nayman argued that the film was hopeful "insofar as it urges the viewer to simply take stock of his and her reality and act accordingly," to which Cockburn replied: "It's gratifying to hear it positioned that way."

== Inspiration and influences ==
In a number of interviews, Cockburn has said that You Are Here is ultimately related to a period when he went through a paranoid-delusional breakdown: "everything I saw, read, and heard was some sort of message to me that needed to be decoded." It was a period of "intense meaning-making ... I'd be looking at any text I'd encounter like a menu or road sign and I'd scramble the letters around and see if there were any different codes there that needed to be deciphered." After a long time, he realized that this behaviour, which was emotionally exhausting and troubling, had emotional underpinnings: "It became something that wasn't just an enjoyable intellectual play. ... In a number of ways I worked through it, and part of that was figuring out what the emotional reasons were." That experience "stayed" with him and worked its way into "just about everything" he wrote or directed:

You Are Here is a compendium of characters dealing with the question of whether their life is just a series of random events, or whether there's some "Great Code" at the heart of it all. It's a cerebral concept, but when you're in the middle of it, it's scary and exciting and sometimes even funny, and that, for me, is the heart of the movie.

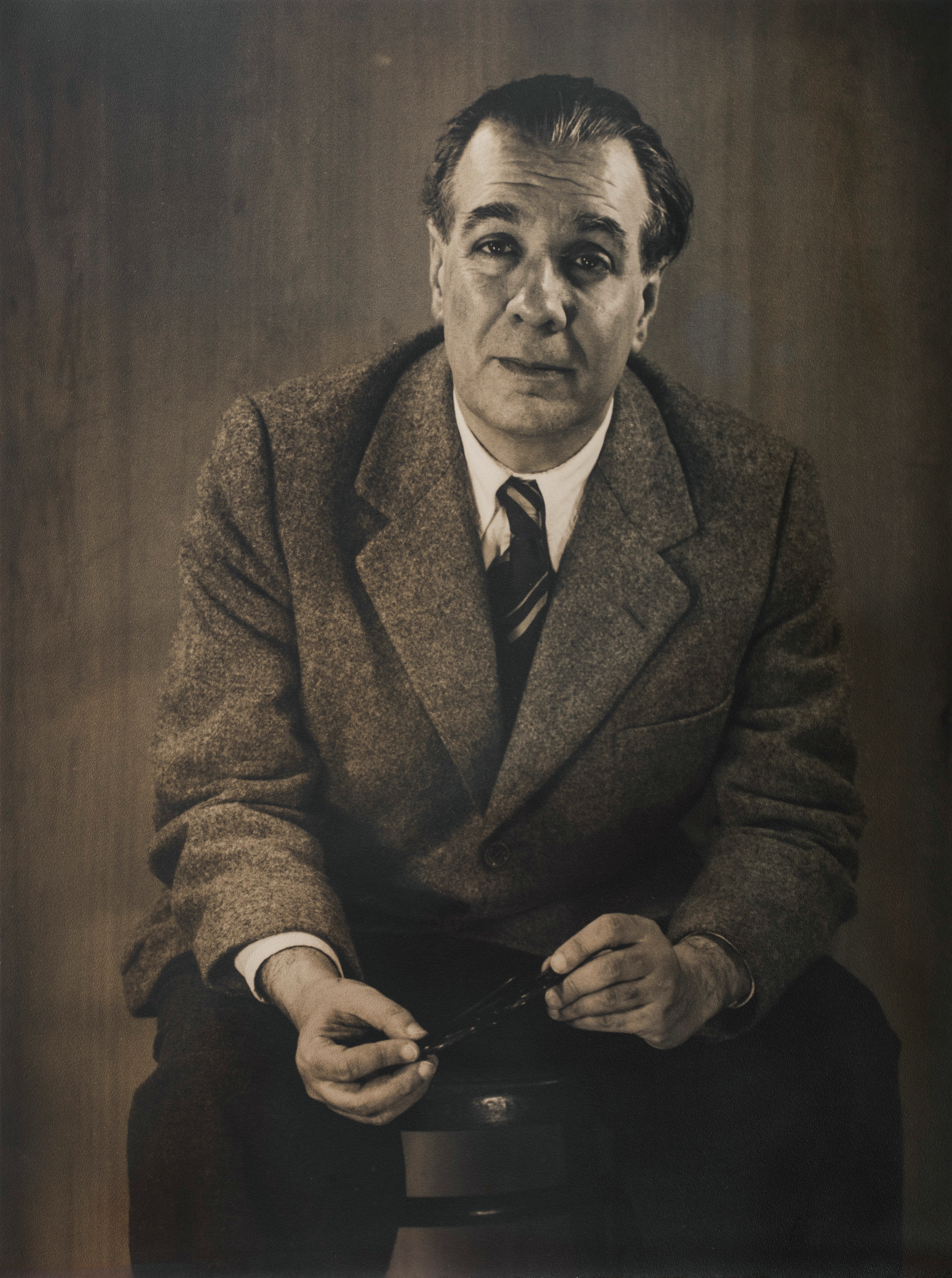
Jorge Luis Borges in 1951

Cockburn's literary influences for You Are Here include Paul Auster and especially Jorge Luis Borges, "where he talks about imagining the path that someone travels in their life and how if you could see that path it might somehow form a shape", that is, a trace "that no person will ever be able to know or see or understand."

That idea is structurally the heart of the movie, but it's also key to the emotional resonance. All the characters are struggling to come to terms with the fact that they can't know the bigger picture of the universe they're living in. They can't know how they relate to the other pieces. They can't see the traces they are leaving.

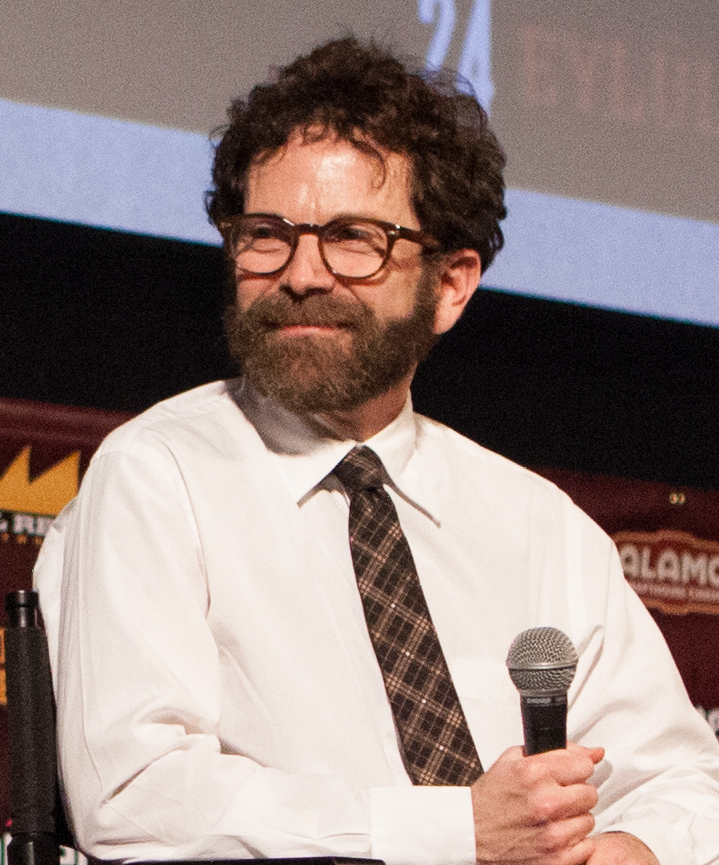
Charlie Kaufman in 2015

His film influences include the directors Todd Haynes (Poison and I'm Not There in particular), "for how he plays with film language with multiple styles in one movie, or the same character being played by multiple actors", and Charlie Kaufman (Synecdoche, New York), which "came out just as we were beginning to cut You Are Here". The film was a Rosetta Stone of sorts, "in its willingness to seriously mess around with the supposed rules of filmmaking and storytelling, but ultimately being a comprehensible and moving experience that hits you on levels you didn't even know you had." It gave Cockburn a lot of hope for his own film.

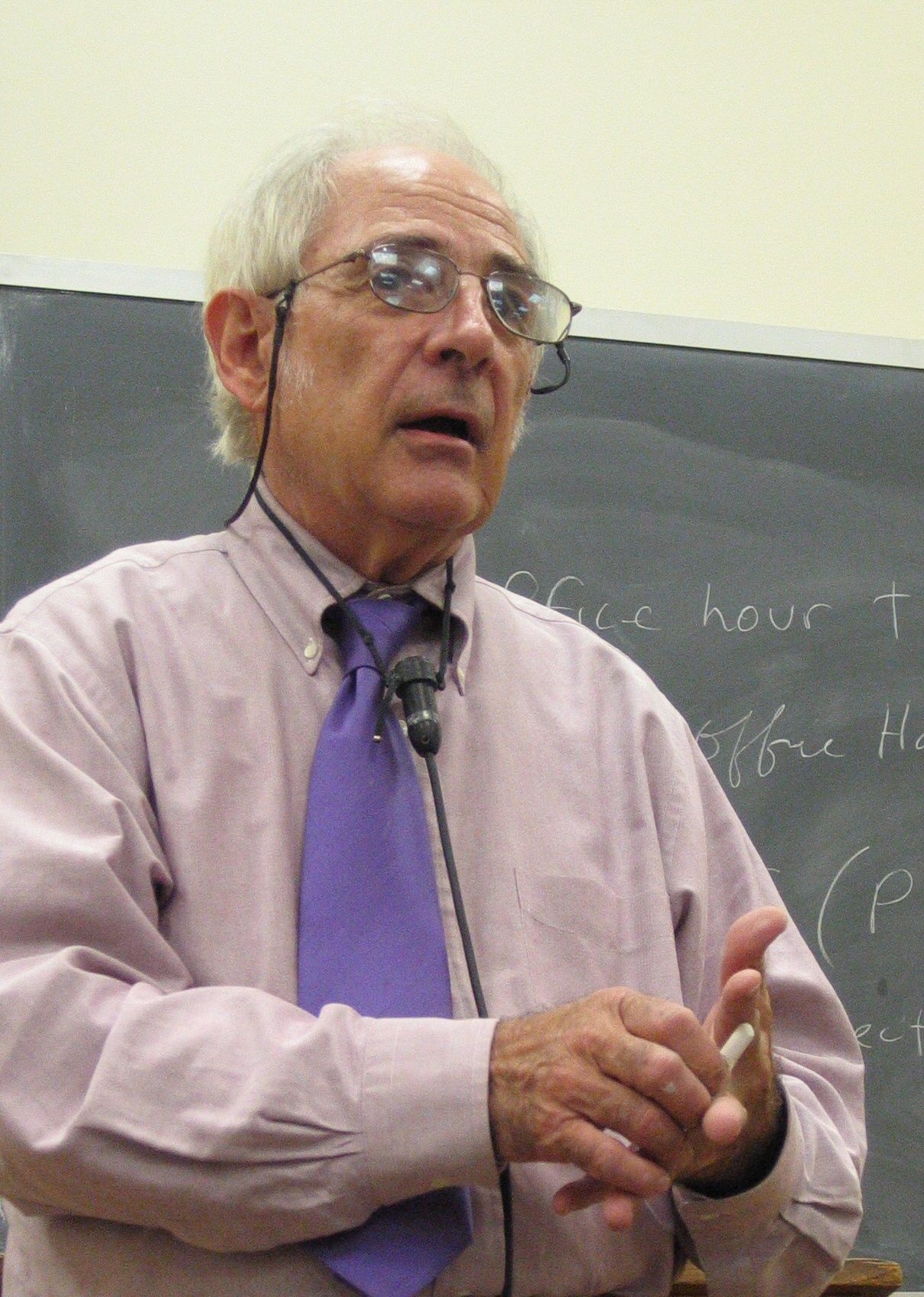
John Searle

The end credits of You Are Here ambiguously suggest the film may or may not include an accurate representation of American philosopher John Searle's ideas. The scenes with the Experimenter are based on Searle's Chinese room thought experiment, which Cockburn described in 2016 as "sort of a pessimistic cousin" to the Turing test: Cockburn, who believes strongly in acknowledging his sources, telephoned Searle to seek permission to use the Chinese room; Searle was "very busy" but later gave "succinct approval". In the Nayman interview, after Cockburn tells this story, he remarks that he forgot to credit Douglas Hofstadter who wrote Gödel, Escher, Bach, which was the source for the film's "headache" word puzzle.

== Production ==
=== Financing and development ===
Cockburn received a Chalmers Arts Fellowship in 2006, which enabled him to leave his job for a year and work on the script. In 2008, he received additional funding from the Canada and Ontario Arts Councils, which made it possible to go into production, though it was several months before he found a producer: "through a daisy-chain of meetings and recommendations," he met Daniel Bekerman, and immediately knew that his combination of experience and "practical know-how" combined with a deep understanding of alternative cinema made him "an ideal collaborator". Cockburn relied heavily on Bekerman for logistics, from assembling the crew to finding equipment and other resources. As for Cabot McNenly, the cinematographer, he was a colleague and friend from Cockburn's York University film days; they had wanted to work together for years: "so he was on board literally a couple of years before we went to camera."

The "micro-sized" budget (estimated to be $100,000) was a challenge, as Cockburn had not written a simple script for a few actors in a single location, but rather "an incredibly ambitious script production-wise, with many, many locations, a large cast, and heavy demands on production design and cinematography." The script as originally written was structured so that everything had multiple meanings. Cockburn came to greatly appreciate the crew Bekerman had assembled, learning from the experience: "if your crew understands the tone of the script, sometimes one telling detail can do the same cinematic-magical work as a whole swath of complicated ideas, and at one-tenth the cost." Looking back, he also found his personal journey mirrored in the process of making the film:

I started writing it as a very intellectual pursuit, and through making it and collaborating ... all these people with all of their ideas, and these actors who gave human reality to these concepts that I had written down, that creative evolution from script to human movie is parallel to the journey of realizing that intellectual traps and thought patterns have an emotional underpinning.

=== Writing ===
The process of writing You Are Here from conception to final draft took two and a half years, the culmination of a "long conversation" he was having with himself over ten years; in a sense, it is a lot of his own life "boiled down into 78 minutes." Cockburn said he first conceived of You Are Here as "both a series of shorts and a feature-length movie," like a concept album or short story collection that "halfway through, you realize is actually a novel." In the Nayman interview, Cockburn complained that in previous screenings of his short films, reception depended a lot on what other films they were shown with, and he started to think it might be a good idea to make a series of short films that were "a whole program unto themselves, which were intended to be shown together, with certain recurring images and ideas." Initially, there were six short film scripts, each section with its own title, separated by red pages:

Someone read them and said that the red pages made sense with regards to the script as a physical object—as a way of organizing the pages—but told me to ask myself what they stood for in the film. This same person also told me that I needed to give the audience a way into the material, a kind of proxy character. From those two suggestions, I came up with the idea of the Archivist and her dilemma.

=== Casting ===
Cockburn was familiar with Tracy Wright's work in Me and You and Everyone We Know, as well as her short video work and her live performances, which he had seen in Texas in 2002. He thought she would be perfect for the role of the Archivist after seeing her in Monkey Warfare. He contacted her through a colleague with whom he had worked in experimental theatre (Jacob Wren), sent her the script, then met and talked with her for three hours or more, during which she said she didn't "get" the script, at which point he told her about the "paranoid-delusional breakdown" he had gone through, and how that was the "emotional basis" for what he had written: "I don't know if that's what helped her find her way in, but however it happened, she found the non-theoretical, genuine core of the character." Moreover, Cockburn has since said "she built something more human and complex and real than what I imagined."

There was a real honesty to Tracy... I never felt she was holding anything back. And this resulted in a number of great performances. Even during line readings, she'd recite her part in ways I wasn't expecting, but in ways that made complete sense. This is what added humanity to her character.

Wright shot You Are Here about a year before her diagnosis of pancreatic cancer, and saw the finished work a few months before her death. Cockburn recalled that after an early screening, before the final edit, Wright told him she liked the film, but not her own performance: "The edit took a long time, but eventually, with dialogue editing and narration voice work, we got the cut and did another screening. It means so much to me that Tracy came up to me and said, 'I didn't like myself in it, but I do now.'"

Cockburn said he originally tried to get David Cronenberg to play the Lecturer, but he was "unavailable", which, with hindsight, Cockburn was glad about: Cronenberg is quite recognizable, so the viewer would know what is on the screen is fictional, whereas R.D. Reid is not so well known (and, according to Cockburn, is also a much better actor than Cronenberg). As noted above, Reid saw his role and the film in general, as about "how to deal with deep-seated despair", and Cockburn has said "it's exactly what I saw in his performance, a performance which frankly went far beyond what I had expected for the role."

For the Experimenter, Cockburn wanted to cast himself, because he thought the role was similar to videos he made before where he was the performer, but changed his mind:

I ... really liked, structurally, the center of the movie being about someone who puts himself in his own experiment, and I as the moviemaker, putting myself in the role. But when we were doing auditions I used Chinese room text as audition material as a test, and this one guy, Anand Rajaram, read ... in a way that was creepy and hilarious and upsetting at the same time; he's many things at once, he's a really unique performer. As soon as I saw him, I thought I'll fire myself and let him do it. And I'm really glad I did.

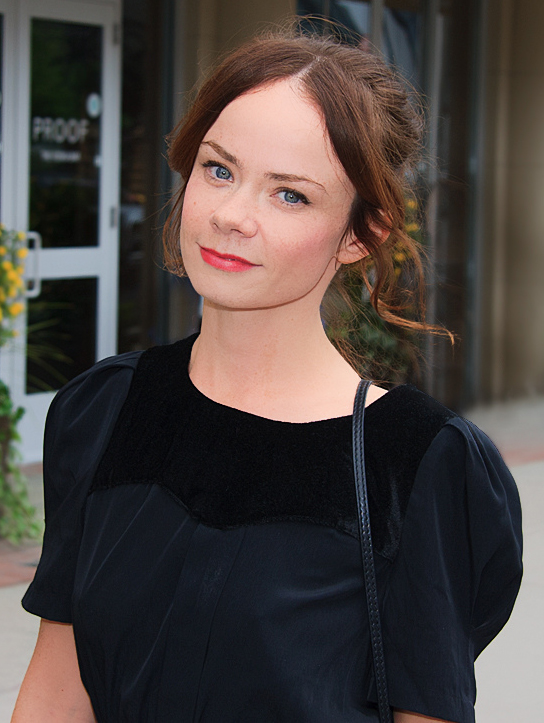
Nadia Litz at TIFF in 2010.

As with Wright, Cockburn thought of casting Nadia Litz after seeing her in Monkey Warfare. It was Wright who told Litz about Cockburn's project. "I read the script five times before I could comment on it... Sometimes I think it makes more sense on paper. Not in a bad way."

London Angelis also voiced the unnamed infant character in The Bad Idea Reunion, a short film Cockburn also released in 2010.

=== Design ===
The film has a "lo-fi, anachronistic production design." There are VHS tapes, Polaroid pictures, land line phones, large cell phones and dated computers, all of it intentional:"If the movie had been set in the here and now, and everybody had been surrounded by amusing cellphones and iPods and GPS, it would have made everything feel way too blunt and obvious." Cockburn wanted to "shift everything sideways" and regrets there were "a couple of laptops in there", but they were needed for the production. The result is a film that takes place "in a time that has never actually existed."

Production designer Naz Goshtasbpour was given a working budget, that, according to Cockburn, "a lot of people in her position would have found laughable; but she managed to build a number of totally convincing sets entirely from scratch, and came up with ingenious solutions for slightly modifying locations to make them exactly what we needed." The books for the Chinese room were mostly styrofoam props (one was a real book, and she said it was the most expensive film prop she had ever made). After finishing the film, Cockburn says he carried these fake books with him from home to home despite their having no use: "After eight years, I finally threw them out."

=== Filming ===
Although Cockburn had spent the previous decade making short experimental films, this was not is original ambition: "You Are Here represents a return to my early desire to be a narrative feature-film director, but it's a strange, unorthodox way of storytelling which uses all the techniques I've been exploring in the last decade in service of creating a long-form emotional story experience for the audience." You Are Here was shot with very little rehearsal time for the actors, but Cockburn points out that he did get the chance to chat with them about the script and the ideas: "I think that was probably more useful than rehearsal would have been."

==== Principal photography ====
I don't want to say that Toronto is devoid of globally recognizable cultural and architectural landmarks. But if you want to make a movie that's spatially anonymous, it'll work for you.

— Daniel Cockburn (interviewed by Norman Wilner)

You Are Here was shot on almost all possible formats: 35mm, 16mm, RED, HD, MiniDV, Super 8, and BetaMax. Cockburn was proud of the spectrum of visual styles brought to the work with this approach, and said BetaMax was his favourite footage in the entire film, once remarking that since only about 15% of the work was actually shot on film, he avoids calling it a "film". Having shot it entirely in Toronto, Cockburn deliberately fudged the city's geography in the dialogue, making up "a mishmash of Toronto streets and also made-up names and numbered streets so nobody could ever watch the movie and try to correlate it with extant geography." Cockburn told Norman Wilner why this was done and that Toronto's relatively anonymous cityscape meant this was fairly easy to do:

It was part of the concept of the movie that the audience isn't supposed to know when or where it's taking place... So had we been shooting in New York or Istanbul or Reykjavik, I still would have been working to make sure we were dealing with non-existent intersections... I think it worked out well that I was shooting this in Toronto... Had I been shooting in New York City, we would have been at every corner trying to run away from landmarks that would de-anonymize it, you know?

==== Editing ====
Editing the work took a year, during which time "a lot changed". An example of this is the film's opening lecture: as written in the script, it was not at the beginning, but rather about 25 minutes in. Fairly early on, Cockburn and McNenly knew it had to be moved up because of its importance: "if someone comes in three minutes late after that lecture, in one sense you didn't miss anything... In another sense you miss everything. It functions as the keynote lecture to how to watch this movie."

=== Marketing and related works ===
In 2009, Cockburn presented some of his earlier films and videos as part of the launch of a publication about his work by Spencer W. Parsons. The program included The Chinese Room, presented as a ten-minute work-in-progress excerpt from his upcoming feature.

== Release ==
The film's world premiere took place at the 63rd Locarno Film Festival on 8 August 2010, where it was in competition for a Filmmakers of the Present Award. The Canadian premiere was held on 15 September 2010, at the 35th annual Toronto International Film Festival, in the Canada First section, at the TIFF Bell Lightbox. It went on to be screened at the Whistler Film Festival in December, (Note: Further Canadian festival screenings included Victoria in February, Kingston Canadian on 5 March 2011, Calgary Underground on 12 April 2011, and Fantasia in Montréal and the Picton Picturefest, both in July.) and then at the Göteborg International Film Festival and the International Film Festival Rotterdam in January 2011. (Note: Later screenings at festivals in the European area included Belfast, CPH PIX (Copenhagen), the 30th International Istanbul Film Festival, and the REC in Tarragona, all in April. On 1 May (May Day), the film was screened at the BFI Southbank in as part of the 10th Sci-Fi London Festival. Later the same month, it was shown at the European Media Art Festival in Osnabrück, Germany, where it won the EMAF Award. In July, it was screened at the Era New Horizons Festival in Wrocław. In mid autumn, it was screened in Liverpool as part of the Abandon Normal Devices Festival of New Cinema and Digital Culture. At the Impakt Festival in Utrecht in late November and early December, Cockburn was the festival's artist in residence, and You Are Here was screened along with several of Cockburn's short films.)

=== Distribution ===
Unlike Cockburn's short films, exclusively distributed by Vtape, Cockburn opted to distribute You Are Here with former Hollywood producer Zanne Divine's newly formed Canadian company Pacific Northwest Pictures, as well as IndiePix in the United States. The American premiere took place at the Santa Barbara International Film Festival where it was shown on 2, 4, 5 February 2011. (Note: It went on to be screened at the Miami and Ann Arbor Film Festivals in March, and Seattle later in the Spring.) It did not receive its limited release in the U.S. until a premiere in New York City on 11 May 2012 (a one-week run at the reRun Gastropub Theater in Brooklyn). (Note: By this time, the film had already reached screens in Tokyo (Image Forum Festival) and Melbourne, in June and July of the previous year.)

==== Home media ====
A DVD has been available from IndiePix Films in the U.S since June 2012, with video on demand and download options.

The Spanish DVD (2012, Cameo Media and Cine Binario, titled Usted Está Aquí) includes bonus content in the form of two short science fiction films by Madrid director Javier Chillon, Die Schneider Krankheit (2008) and Decapoda Shock (2011). This was the fourth DVD released by Cine Binario, which formed in 2011. The DVD cover is derived from an earlier promotional poster for the film based on a still from The Chinese Room showing Anand Rajaram drawing a red circle on glass and filling it to form a dot.

==== Streaming ====
Streaming service Mubi showed You Are Here "nearly worldwide" from 29 September to 28 October 2016.

=== Retrospectives ===
In 2017, by which time it was estimated that the film had been screened at over forty festivals since its original release, C.J. Prince lamented that You Are Here was "underseen and underrated". The film was selected for a Canadian Open Vault free screening at the 2017 Canada's Top Ten minifestival, in January 2018, and as part of the curated film season "A Cinema of Forking Paths – Films Inspired by Borges" in collaboration with the British National Film and Television School, the screening taking place at the Horse Hospital Cinema, in London, England, on 8 December 2018.

== Reception ==
=== Critical response ===
On review aggregator Rotten Tomatoes, the film has achieved a score of 83% based on twelve reviews, for an average rating of 7/10. On Metacritic, which uses a weighted score, the film has received a 63 out of 100 based on four reviews, indicating "generally favorable reviews".

You Are Here was called "a major discovery" by the director of the Locarno Festival, Olivier Père. Sources differ as to its wider reception at Locarno. Audiences are said to have been "sharply divided" by Leslie Felperin, whereas Adam Nayman refers to "the few people" who saw it before the Toronto festival as having deemed it "difficult" and Norman Wilner says it was "received enthusiastically by critics and audiences."

Early festival reviews, such as Felperin's, called the film "charming" and "playful" and compared it to the films of Charlie Kaufman. Canadian filmmaker Atom Egoyan is quoted as calling the film inventive and multi-layered, and "a brilliantly organized first feature full of philosophical ideas and tremendous energy." John Semley assigns the film five stars, saying "there are more brains, imagination, and spark in You Are Here than there were in the last four Egoyan movies." He elaborates on this in the preface to his interview with Cockburn, saying the film may be "the best film yet made about the cumulative effect that internet-saturation, YouTube, and Google Mapping have had on our world", and calling it "intellectually and emotionally exciting", admiring how Cockburn buries the present "in dated technology and nostalgia" which "only reinforces the skill with which You Are Here diagrams the contemporary flattening of time, space, and identity." Leslie Felperin praised the "mostly unknown cast", who contributed "solid" performances: "Wright's part is the meatiest by far, and she brings an affecting vulnerability to her role as the confused archivist." This view is shared by Adam Nayman, who calls the film "very ambitious and ultimately rewarding", finding "a lot of filmgoing pleasure here, in the way that Cockburn and his cinematographer Cabot McNenly create telling textural gradations across the film's different segments". Peter Howell's final word in his review for The Toronto Star is simply "Wow": "Meticulously conceived, shot and edited, it's Cockburn's first feature after a string of well-received shorts, and it's quite the calling card."

Francis Ouellette called it the most elusive and unique film to be presented at Fantasia Montréal in 2011, and a great discovery, a view he shared with festival organizer Simon Laperrière. Josef Woodard appreciates the tone and manner of "easy-going experimentalism, to ends which are somehow simultaneously contemplative and intellectually madcap", a film full of "conundrums, visual puns, and self-commenting ruses, hypnotic and seemingly non-linear but actually organized with a looping internal logic", with generous doses of self-effacing humor that "help the brainy business go down easily and even coaxes out a laugh or three." At Era New Horizons, You Are Here was the film Ludwika Mastalerz "was rooting for the most", calling it "an amusing crash-course in analytical philosophy", admiring how "Cockburn flows freely from one abstract idea to the next. He doesn't settle for simple imagery, transforming it instead in his own style." Virginie Sélavy, reviewing the film after its first screening at the BFI Southbank, describes it as "a tremendously rich experience, invigorating and joyous as well as unsettling and thought-provoking, and, when the consciousness we have seen at work throughout the film dies out at the end, a surprisingly moving one too."

In the New Year's Eve 2013 edition of Now, Susan G. Cole, Glenn Sumi, Norman Wilner, John Semley, all four critics based in Toronto, assigned You Are Here second place in a list of "top 25 Toronto films".

Erick Kohn, who when reporting from Locarno called the film the festival's "most original narrative experiment", admired the ambition of the film itself, but said it "suffers from stilted, humorless performances and some clunky pacing issues"; even so, he says "the ideas sustain it", and "Cockburn's use of pop philosophy yields an original form of heady entertainment", assigning the film a grade of "B+". Noel Murray of The A.V. Club assigns a grade of "B", opining that the film, while it may be "often highbrow, it's never dry" and Cockburn "keeps the audience on its toes". C.J. Prince rates the film 7.4/10, finding the film's individual segments are compelling in their own right, but the "ending stumbles a bit with the way it forcefully ties the segments together," and yet the film "is brimming with so many ideas that it makes up for its issues with the execution." Eli Glasner gives the film 3.5/5: "To be blunt, this movie's not for everyone, but stick with it to the end and some of the puzzle pieces finally fall into place. If you're looking for explanations, Cockburn would never be so obvious. A mood piece and a post-modern maze, You Are Here is where you are." Rhett Bartlett agrees: "It is tough going at stages, but contains some splendid ideas."

Slant's Chuck Bowen gives the film 2 stars out of 4, echoing Kohn's view that "Cockburn isn't without ambition or talent", but while conceding the film has "a striking look, and some moments have an ominous charge," he finds "the film is mostly ponderous. Each story essentially arrives at the same purposefully irresolvable conclusion, and many of them are accompanied by narration that's performed in a drone that immediately grows tedious. And Cockburn is fatally humorless".

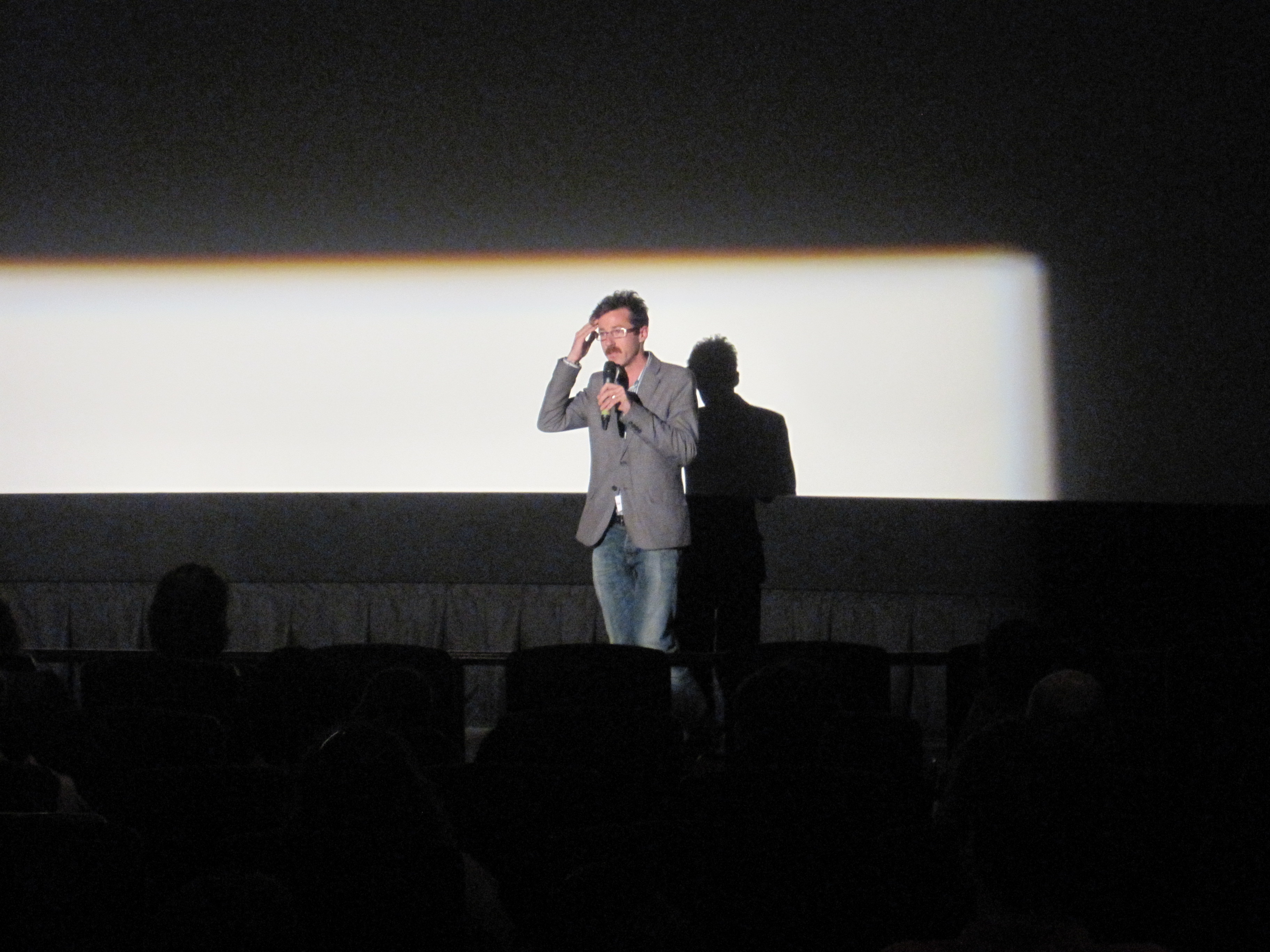
Director Daniel Cockburn leads a post-show Q&A after a screening of You Are Here

=== Audience response ===
You Are Here was received enthusiastically by audiences as much as by critics. Based on Cockburn's question-and-answer sessions or emails he received, he was gratified that "people get it."

They don't just get it cerebrally, but they connect with it; they find it entertaining, and they find it funny and moving. These are all the things we were hoping for, but they're the things you can't predetermine or guarantee. You can't know, until the movie enters into that dialogue with other people.

Cockburn came to believe that the film "stirs up a lot of strange thoughts in the viewer, and there are a lot of different ways to react." Discussion often tended toward people asking about his religious or cosmic beliefs: "It feels strange that that should be something a roomful of people would want to know, because I'm not an authority on anything - except this movie."

=== Accolades ===
Awards

- Toronto Film Critics Association Awards 2010 • Jay Scott Prize for Emerging Talent (C$5000)
- 24th European Media Art Festival, 2011 • EMAF Award for trend-setting media art (€1500)

Nominations

- Locarno International Film Festival, 2010 • Filmmakers of the Present (Golden Leopard)
- Santa Barbara International Film Festival, 2011 • Panavision Spirit Award for Independent Cinema
- CPH PIX, 2011 • New Talent Grand Prix
- T-Mobile New Horizons International Film Festival (Wrocław), 2011 • Grand Prix
- Genie Awards, 2011 • Best Achievement in Sound Editing (Fred Brennan)
