= Galaxy of Horrors =

- Film poster
- Directed by: Dennis Cabella; Todd Cobery; Javier Chillon; Andrew Desmond; Benni Diez; Marcello Ercole; Jean-Phillipe Ferré; Richard Karpala; Justin McConnell; Antonio Padovan; Fabio Prati; Ethan Shaftel; Marinko Spahić
- Produced by: Justin McConnell; Avi Federgreen; (associate producers:); Jay Clarke; Daryl Shaw; (executive producers:); Rodrigo Gudiño; Dave Alexander
- Music by: Sean Motley
- Animation by: Chris Murch
- Production companies: IndieCan Entertainment; Unstable Ground; Rue Morgue Magazine; Little Terrors
- Distributed by: Unstable Ground
- Release date: 1 March 2017
- Running time: 107 minutes
- Country: Canada
- Languages: English; Italian; German

Galaxy of Horrors is a 2017 Canadian science-fiction horror anthology film consisting of eight short films within larger "wraparound" framing sequences before and after each of the shorts, in which a man (Adam Buller) wakes from a cryogenic sleep pod and is forced to watch the films as entertainment while his life-support runs out. The shorts are by international filmmakers such as Antonio Padovan, Javier Chillon, Benni Diez, Ethan Shaftel and Marinko Spahić, while Justin McConnell directed the wraparound.

== Plot ==
=== Untitled wraparound ===
Mr. Brown wakes up in deep space trapped in his cryogenic stasis pod. Unable to get out because of a faulty system asking him for a password, he is forced to wait and watch science fiction horror shorts chosen by the computer for his entertainment, even though this is draining the life support system. During the brief intermissions, he tries guessing the password again and again, with events taking a more and more dire turn.

- Canada, 2017: directed by Justin McConnell (cast: Adam Buller)

=== Eden ===
In a future United States, a civil war has poisoned the air and very few people can survive for long without a gas mask. One of the factions manages to infiltrate a compound on the other side with the aim of assassinating the president and liberating one of their own who has a natural immunity to the air and is the victim of torture and experiments.

- United States, 2013: directed and written by Todd Coberry (cast: Charles Hubbell, David Tufford, Heidi Fellner, Dax Grap)
  - Best Short and Costume Design, GenArt film festival, 2013

=== Iris ===
A man named Dave tries to hide a dead body, but his smartphone's AI, Iris, has developed a sense of ethics and justice, challenging his actions and finding ways to thwart him.

- United Kingdom-United States, 2015: directed and written by Richard Karpala (cast: Luke Sorge, Michelle Strickland)
  - Best Overall Film and Best Director, Fright Film Fest 2015 (Almost Famous Film Festival) • Best Short Film (Bronze), Fantasia, 2015

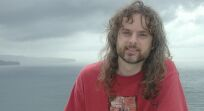
Philosopher David Chalmers appears as himself in Flesh Computer.

=== Flesh Computer ===
A weary handyman does his best to maintain order and care for his cybernetic "pet project", a strange mix of machine and flesh. But when a pair of thuggish residents threaten a young girl, the line between human and machine becomes blurred.

- United States, 2014: directed and written by Ethan Shaftel (cast: Rob Kerkovich, Anthony Guerino, Elle Gabriel, David Chalmers)
  - Best Special Effects, The Indie Horror Festival (Chicago) • Best Screenplay, Latronic Horror Festival (Latronico)

=== Pathos ===
A man is hooked up to a machine via a large tube attached to the top of his head; he pays for experiences, his senses, and life itself with increasing desperation as the computer system steadily blocks each of his senses after he has an unauthorized thought.

- Italy, 2009: created by Dennis Cabella, Marcello Ercole, and Fabio Prati (cast: Fabio Prati, Grant Mountjoy, Daniele Gatti, Silvia Quarantini, Giorgio Viaro)
  - Méliès d'Argent, 2010 (presented at Leeds) • Best Foreign Short Film, Fancine, 2009

=== Eveless ===
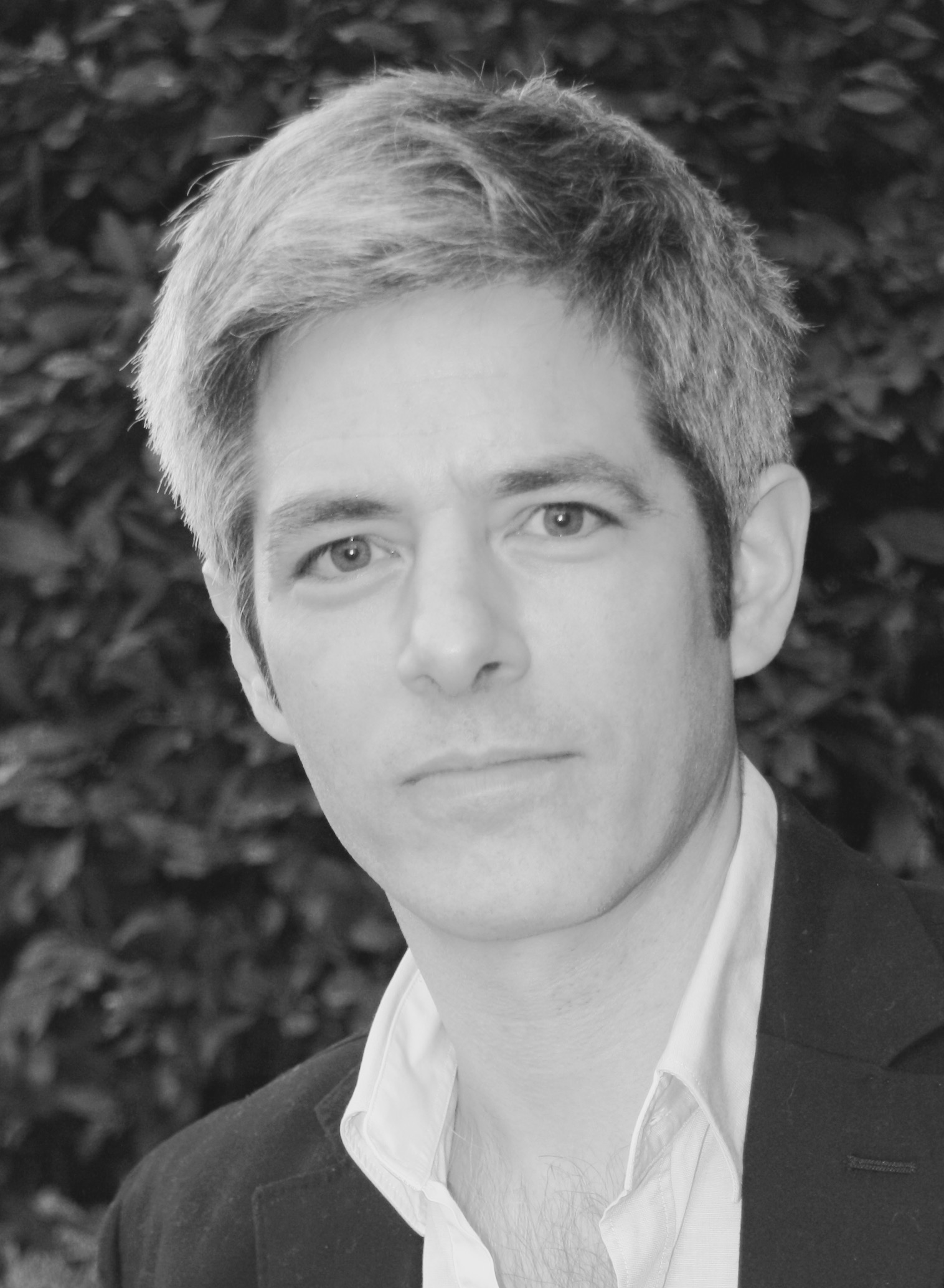
Julio Perillán stars in They Will All Die in Space

In a future world where women no longer exist, two men have desperately tried to conceive. One of them is in labour and neither is prepared for what is about to happen.

- United States, 2016: directed by Antonio Padovan; commissioned for the anthology; written by Padovan and Dolores Diaz (cast: Vin Kridakorn, Greg Engbrecht)
  - Best Editing, New York Premiere Film Festival, 2017

=== They Will All Die in Space ===
Two men wake a third from stasis in the hope he can fix their damaged ship, adrift in deep space. As he begins work, he realizes things are not quite what they seem.

- Spain, 2015: directed and written by Javier Chillon (cast: Francesc Garrido, Julio Perillán, Ben Temple)
  - Best Short Film, Sitges and Cartagena, 2015 • GenreBlast, 2016

=== Entity ===
Minutes after the technical failure of her spacecraft, an astronaut finds herself ejected into space. She tries in vain to call for help. She is slowly running out of air. Little by little, fear grabs hold of her, and she faints. After floating adrift for several hours through the immensity of space, she awakens to find herself facing a strange and sentient entity in the form of a nebula.

- France, 2014: directed by Andrew Desmond and co-written by Jean-Phillipe Ferré (cast: Alias Hilsum)
  - Best Visual Effects, Hollywood Horror Fest, and FilmQuest Film Festival, Provo, Utah, 2014

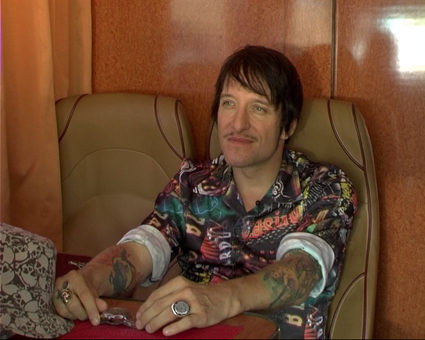
Bela B (Dirk Felsenheimer), credited in Kingz with a mashup of his real and stage names, in 2007

=== Kingz ===
Two drug couriers go to an underground club to make a delivery but come up against something not of this world.

- Germany, 2007: directed and written by Benni Diez and Marinko Spahić (cast: Olli Banjo, Mathis Landwehr, Claire Oelkers, Bela B. Felsenheimer, Ben Schamma, Frank Zube, Christian Gneiẞl, Marsul Stefanec)
  - Méliès d'Argent (Short Film), 2009 (presented at Trieste Science+Fiction) • Best Short Film, Trieste Science+Fiction, 2008

== Production ==
The anthology film is the second collaboration between Rue Morgue Cinema and the Little Terrors short films festival, following Minutes Past Midnight. The feature is the brain-child of Little Terrors founder Justin McConnell, who wrote and directed the narrative links between the shorts, and Indiecan Entertainment's Avi Federgreen.

== Release and reception ==
Galaxy of Horrors had a premiere in Toronto at Imagine Cinemas Carlton on 1 March 2017.

=== Home media and streaming ===
The Galaxy of Horrors anthology was released on DVD and special edition Blu-ray in 2017. The anthology was made available through various video on demand options on the IndieCan Entertainment website, on 7 March 2017, and on Amazon Prime.

=== Critical response ===
A number of reviewers found similarities in the film or individual segments with the Black Mirror series, usually as a point in the anthology's favour. Carl Fisher is impressed by the "seriously high production values", remarking that "some of the visuals ... are simply stunning".

Addison Wylie described the "claustrophobic wraparound short" by Justin McConnell as "semi-meta" and "pretty clever"; a bit of Mystery Science Theater 3000 dowsed in Heavy Metal: "The videos play for him – and for us – in a disjointed order; a forgivable trait since Galaxy of Horrors basically throws the audience into immediate abruptness." Carl Fisher called its story "minimal but with a fun payoff." Karina Adelgaard appreciated the intermissions as "little nuggets of comedy" and a "welcome relief" since most of the shorts are very dark.

== Sequel ==
The next film in the series compiled by Justin McConnell is Blood, Sweat, and Terrors (2018).
