= Die Schneider Krankheit =

- Film poster
- Directed by: Javier Chillon
- Written by: Javier Chillon
- Produced by: Javier Chillon
- Starring: Paco Casares; Franz Leisdon; Jeff Callow; Joe Durán; José Antonio Fuentes; Gonzalo Terreros; Félix Lalanne; Patxi Hurtado; Sergio Chehabi; Jesús Espinoso; Alberto Martín; Javier Chillon Sr.
- Cinematography: Luis Fuentes
- Edited by: Javier Chillon; Luis Fuentes
- Music by: Cirilo Fernández
- Animation by: Alicia Manero
- Production company: Überblick Films
- Distributed by: CineBinario-Films
- Release date: 2 October 2008 (Sitges)
- Running time: 10 minutes
- Country: Spain
- Languages: Spanish, German
- Budget: €9000

Die Schneider Krankheit (Spanish: El Mal de Schneider; English: The Schneider Disease, alternately Schneider's Disease) is a 2008 Spanish short science fiction mockumentary film written, directed, and produced by Javier Chillon, with brief animated sequences by Alicia Manero. Chillon's first film was shot on black and white Super 8 film, with a Spanish-language voice-over dubbed over another German one. With credits and most other onscreen text in German, the short film gives the impression of being a West German educational documentary film of the 1950s or 1960s. Its subject is the effect of an extraterrestrial plague brought to Earth by a Soviet chimpanzee cosmonaut after its capsule crash landed near the border with East Germany in 1958. Financed entirely by Chillon himself, the short film was selected for more than 200 international film festivals and received more than 45 awards within the first two years of its release, including a Méliès d'Argent in 2010.

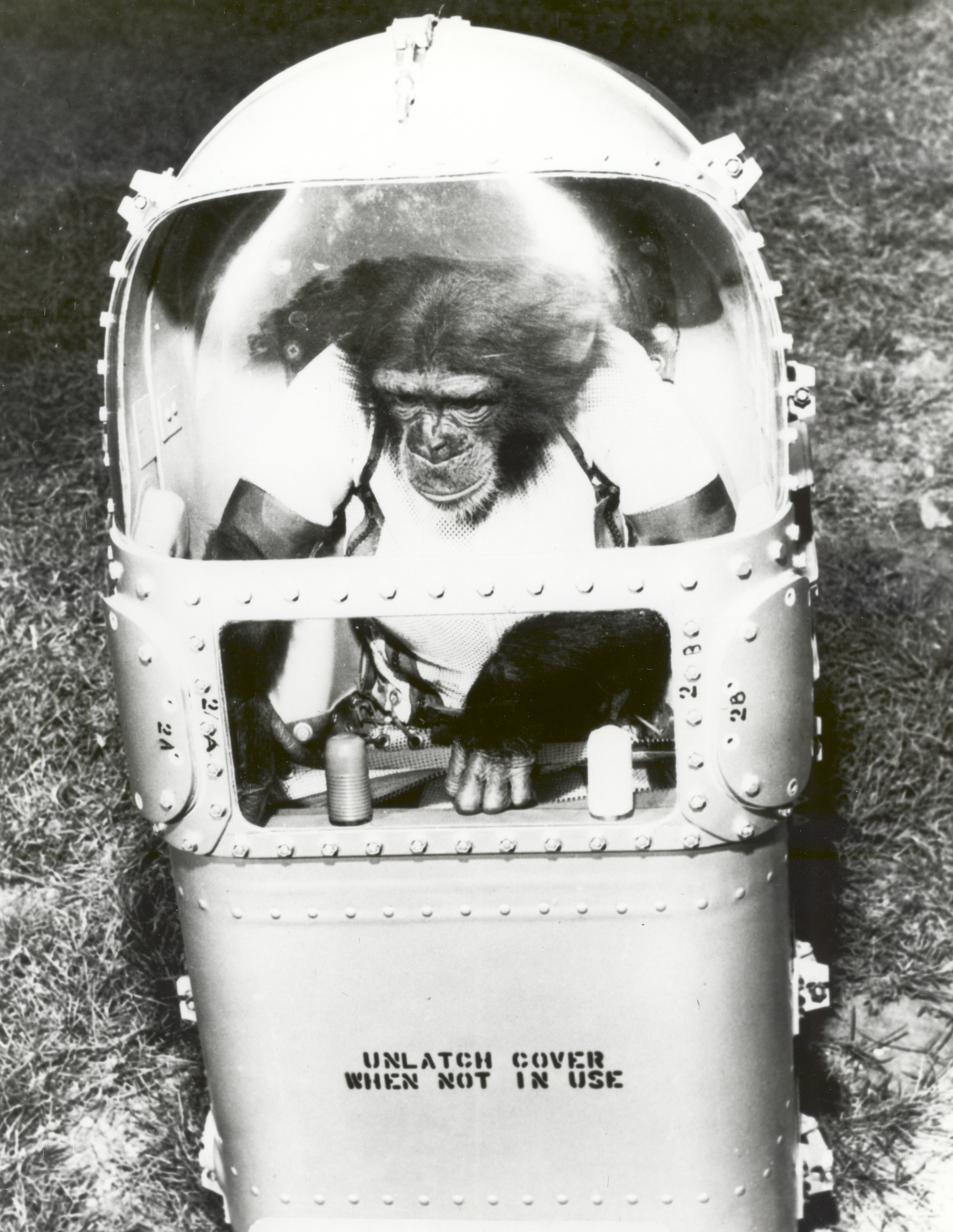
Ham, the first chimpanzee in space, shown in the life support system used for his January 1961 flight ultimately leading to the crewed orbital flights of NASA's Project Mercury. In the alternate history of Die Schneider Krankheit, the Soviets achieved this three years earlier, but with unforeseen consequences.

== Plot ==
In 1958, recent history is presented in the form of a documentary about a crashed Soviet space capsule near the border with East Germany. Inside the capsule is a chimpanzee cosmonaut, taken and subjected to tests by West German scientists. Soon after the discovery, the same scientists and their assistants get sick. The sickness spreads, and within a month, the first of the infected begin to die.

A struggle to find a cure ensues, resulting in a hybrid creature referred to as a chimera, genetically engineered from a green sea turtle, medicinal leech, and ocellated lizard whose purpose is to perform a kind of bleeding on the sick, effecting a limited cleansing of the patient's systems. The treatment extends survival by about ten months, but everyone, even those so treated, must wear gas masks to avoid new infections, which is the present state of things at the end of the documentary, in which a nuclear family is shown at home, each of them wearing a mask and living a "normal life".

== Cast ==
Actors

- Jeff Callow
- Joe Durán
- José Antonio Fuentes
- Gonzalo Terreros
- Félix Lalanne
- Patxi Hurtado
- Sergio Chehabi
- Jesús Espinoso
- Alberto Martín
- Javier Chillon Sr

Voice

- Paco Casares (Spanish narration)
- Franz Leisdon (German narration)

== Inspiration, themes, and analysis ==
Javier Chillon's main inspiration was the "Hollywood look of the 50s and the educational films of that time, documentaries with an enormous propagandistic content". He was also inspired by the period's American newsreels and science fiction B movies, such as those by Roger Corman, and European classics such as Chris Marker's La Jetée (there is a flat shot done as an homage), and Fritz Lang's Metropolis.

Die Schneider Krankheit shares a number of themes with Javier Chillón's second short film, Decapoda Shock: monstrous creatures resulting from "spatial" mutations or genetic manipulation, primarily derived from the science fiction B movies of the 1950s, the "atomic age".

The mockumentary attempts to make its viewers "believe what they are watching" and to recreate a time period "without using any archival footage." Scholar Paweł Frelik remarks that this kind of "retro-inflected material enjoys significant popularity" in twenty-first century science-fiction short films, citing Die Schneider Krankheit, Matthew Savage's Reign of Death (2009), and Johan Löfstedt's Kometen (The Comet, 2004).

== Production ==
=== Writing and development ===
Chillon originally intended to set the film in France, but quickly realised that the story ought to take place in Germany, which has always been the country of "mad doctors" in popular culture, and moreover, the Cold War-era Partition provided an excellent context. There was a storyboard, but, as with a real documentary, there was no sequence development in terms of the movement of dramatic actors; a few sequences were invented on the fly during principal photography.

=== Financing ===
Chillon financed the two-and-a-half-year project himself for €9000, obtaining various elements for free or cheaply through his family connections or friends: for example, the film's art director, his cousin, together with another friend who is a theatre set designer, were able to get the hospital beds for free from rental companies in Madrid, and all the sets were mounted in the loft of a friend's house. Essentially, the budget paid for rolls of film, petrol, and food.

=== Casting and crew ===
The approximately fifty or so non-professional actors who appear in the film were friends, or friends of friends, or parents of friends, and his own father, Javier Chillon, Sr. Even so, they were carefully cast: mainly Spanish, they had to look like Germans of the 1950s, to move and act like the people from the old documentaries, just doing their work, often oblivious to the camera. Chillon obsessed over that aspect. The only professional actor in Die Schneider Krankheit is Paco Casares, the narrator. Chillon saw the stage actor in a play and said to himself, this is the voice; he was easy to direct, and the entirety of his spoken text was recorded in one afternoon.

Most of Chillon's small crew were made up of either members of his family or friends: his father (a painter and sculptor) worked alongside his mother in special effects; his cinematographer Luis Fuentes is a close friend, while make-up was done by a friend who is a professional make-up artist and hairdresser.

=== Design ===
It was important to Chillon to pay attention to the smallest details and create the right atmosphere; the individual elements (wardrobe, sets, actors, and so on) would only work when presented through the correct production values. For the most part the sets such as the tiled walls and floors, microscopes, hospital room, had to be constructed. Despite the aim at realism, it is still a science fiction film and could not be made without special effects, "however we tried not to use info graphics whenever it was possible."

The criterion was clear: using the same techniques used by filmmakers of that time. Models, make-up effects, animations from pictures previously shot and superimposition effects are some of the techniques that helped to set Die Schneider Krankheit in a very specific style and period.

=== Filming ===
The film was shot in Madrid, in black and white Super 8, with a 4:3 aspect ratio, as much for budgetary as for aesthetic reasons. Chillon had worked with 16mm and Super 16 as a student at Solent University, Southampton, but they were too expensive; he and Fuentes began investigating Super 8, wondering why it was no longer used professionally, and discovered friends from Solent University had worked with it, and lent them a Sankyo 320XL camera, which they thought looked like a "toy" when they first saw it; Chillon said jokingly it is the worst camera in the world, but he and Fuentes would not change it once they saw what it could do.

==== Principal photography ====
Shooting began with the most "delicate" parts of the short film, those with the largest sets, neither director nor cinematographer knowing what the outcome would be, having done no tests, also recording in ProHD, in case everything "went to hell", to have a video back-up. Most sequences were shot on a tripod, but in an effort to simulate an older documentary, they also included a few hand-held shots, Fuentes using Tri-X or Plus-X film depending on the amount of light for each shot. They used high contrast film and film grain, which are distinctive of the genre, along with automatic exposure and deliberate "velatures" to reinforce the documentary style:

The real challenge is to achieve the balance between the realism of longer shots with little editing and a more cinematic look: distinctive camera angles and hand-held camera shots. A delicate balance which will guide the audience during the journey through the threatened world of Die Schneider Krankheit.

As most of the cast were not professional actors, they were not put off by the look of the Sankyo camera, until shooting began: it makes a lot of noise, and this led to some of the actors being surprised and not moving.

==== Animation ====
Most of the animation was done on poster prints in Super 8; the pan or tilt of the camera is real. The image of the human body is physical paper put on an easel and rolled. A 50 cm model of the landing space capsule was built by Chillon and his father out of porespan and cardboard, filmed and then integrated into the field.

=== Editing ===
The ten-minute film was edited down from sixty minutes of footage. The result is a film similar to the format of educational documentaries of the 1950s such as might be found in the Prelinger Archives.

=== Sound and music ===
Another element of realism in the film is the superimposing of the voices in German and Spanish, as Chillon explained: "Those documentaries had only one soundtrack, that's the reason why when they were dubbed, the original soundtrack had to be kept in and the translated narration had to be superimposed." Both voices are heard on the soundtrack, "with a distinctive classic tone from the 1950s sci-fi films with characteristic melodies and effects from that era."

Cirilo Fernández is an Argentinian who studied music at Berklee and met Chillon through some friends. Chillon asked him to produce a 1950s B movie orchestral soundtrack with a theremin, which he did in a week, "without real instruments".

== Release ==
Die Schneider Krankheit had its premiere at the 41st Sitges Film Festival on 2 October 2008. There is typically no Super 8 category at film festivals, so it was usually screened among video entries rather than 35 or 16 mm. Within the first two years of its release, the short film was selected for more than 200 international film festivals and received more than forty-five awards. In 2016, there was a special screening of the short with Chillon's third short film, They Will All Die in Space at the Skepto International Film Festival.

=== Home media ===
Die Schneider Krankheit and the director's second film, Decapoda Shock, appear as bonus material on a Spanish-subtitled DVD of Daniel Cockburn's 2010 feature film, You Are Here.

=== Online platform ===
The film is available in its entirety on Vimeo.

== Reception ==
=== Critical response ===
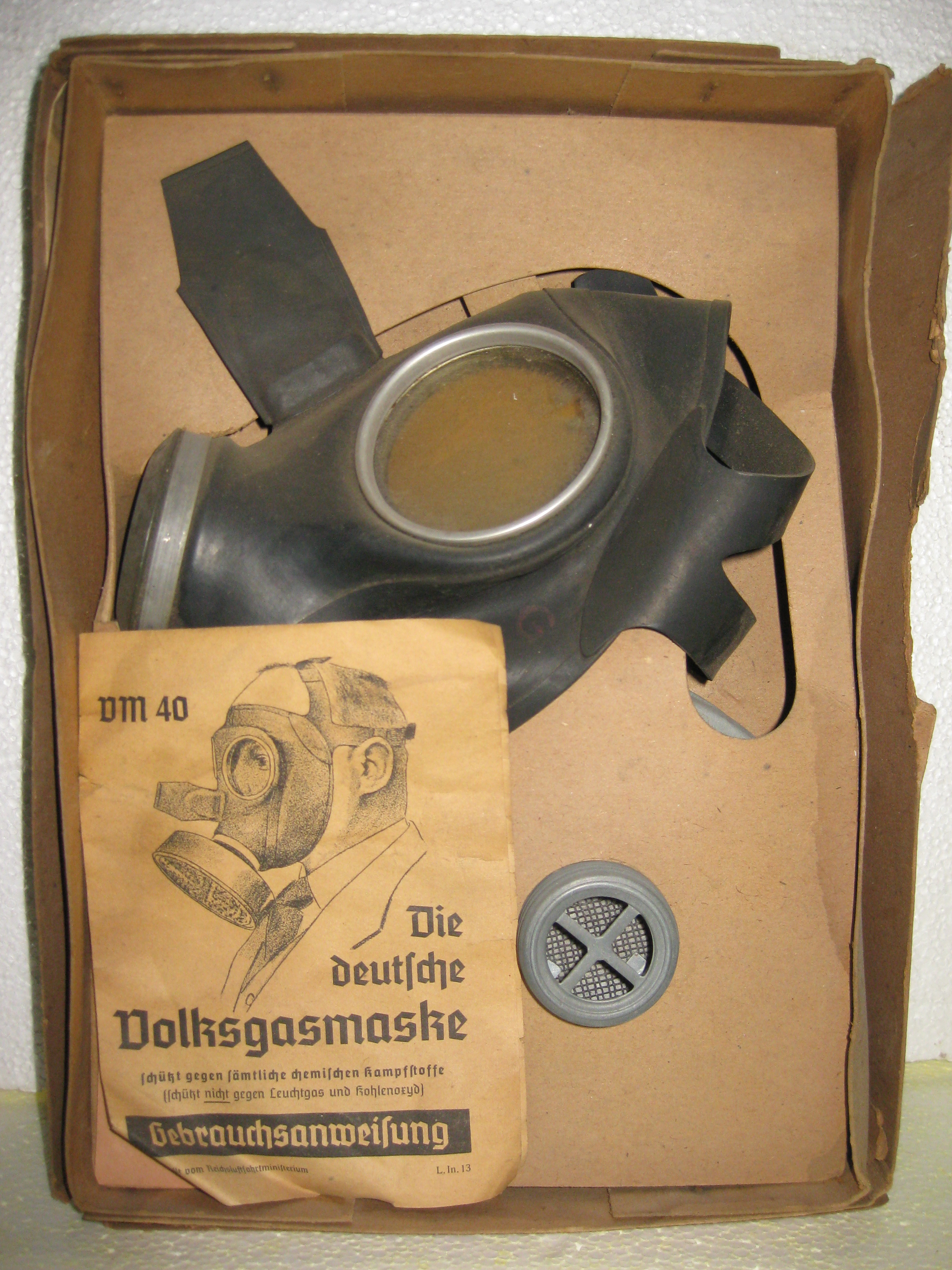
The final scenes of Die Schneider Krankheit show members of a family all wearing World War II-era German gas masks, evoking their use by civilians during the war (image below).

Critics were impressed by the realism of Die Schneider Krankheit, which "painstakingly recreates an alternate history through a seamlessly authentic aesthetic." The editors at Sin Final en el Guion suggest it is probably one of the best first films by any director. The realism achieved is of such a high degree that it was rejected by some early festivals because selectors believed archival footage had been used. As a result, disclaimers were placed at the beginning of the film to "let the viewer know that the images are original, and not extracted from real documentaries." The opening sequence and end credits, along with the dual Spanish-German soundtrack, appear to have been convincing enough to lead some viewers to believe the film is genuinely of German origin (and in one case, Russian). It even won a Best Documentary award at the Sax International Film Festival.

Once the initial misunderstanding about archival footage had been cleared up, the short caught on very quickly, and received "raves on the festival circuit". Virginie Sélavie calls the short "inventive, intelligent", and "fantastic": the "50s newsreel style is perfectly reproduced, while the reasonable tone of the reporter is brilliantly contrasted with the outlandish events depicted." Christopher Webster calls the short a "perfect blend of newsreel, visual FX and creative storytelling".

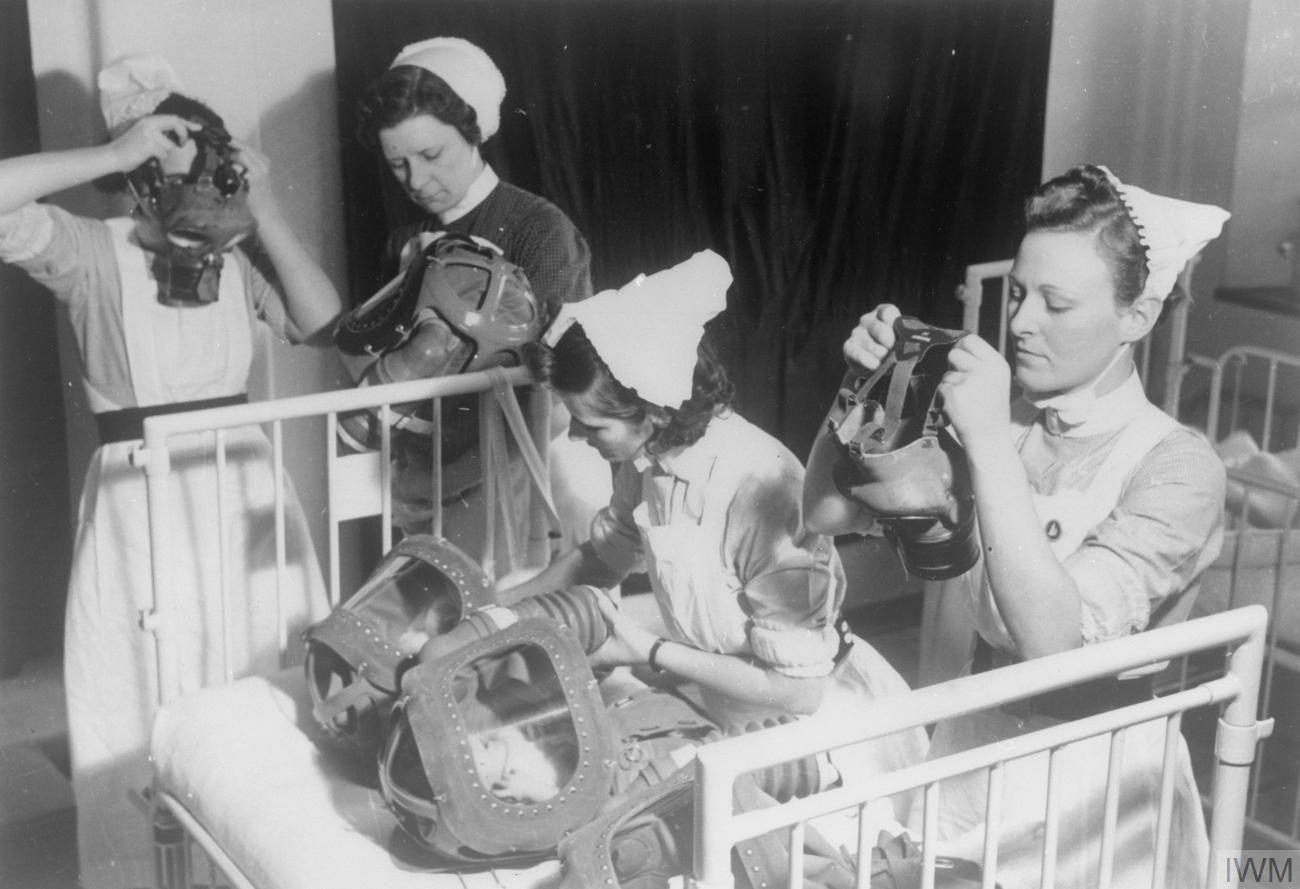
Photograph: "Gas Drill at a London Hospital- Gas Masks For Babies Are Tested, England, 1940"

Artie Knapp was impressed right from the first shots, "with the camera tilting down through the trees to show us the crash site at long range ... a nearly prefect rendition of old documentary style right down to how the camera would move."

This is science fiction that is a deadly accurate portrayal of the calm, governmental, ponderous yet urgent, carefully-framed and full-of-import quality found in mid-century documentary films. The humor is sly and builds its effect gradually. It's also somewhat frightening.

Reviewing the film at the Flatpack Festival, Alex King calls it a highlight of the event, but found it more than "somewhat frightening": "it captures perfectly the dark, clunky feel of old newsreels yet every single shot is created through original footage."

The scene where an innocent 50s nuclear family sit around the television all wearing sinister WWII gas-masks while the narrator explains how "normal family life" has continued despite the epidemic is one of the most chilling things I have ever seen on film.

The special effects were likewise good enough to give a French reviewer goosebumps, who also suggested the short could have made a good story segment on The Twilight Zone. A reviewer on Ain't It Cool News called the film "without a doubt, one of the very oddest – and very best – bits of film that I've come across this year," advising: "Don't try to understand, just enjoy." A Canadian reviewer at the Fantasia International Film Festival expected that a short mockumentary "should be awful, but this 10 minute gem shot on 8mm Tri-X stock is brilliant."

Tim Hall, of the Seattle Post-Intelligencer, gives the short a grade of "C", finding it "somewhat enjoyable if "a little bizarre"; he "wasn't sure where they were going with this film".

=== Accolades ===
By the end of its run in October 2011, Die Schneider Krankheit had been screened at 255 festivals, and won at least fifty awards or special mentions.

==== 2008 ====
Awards

- 18th Fancine • Best Spanish Short Film
- 38th ALCINE (Alcalá de Henares) • Best Art Direction (Ángel Boyado and Nino Morante)
- 15th CineMad - Cine Independiente y de Culto (Madrid) • Best Sci-Fi Short Film
- 10th Certamen Internacional de Cortos (Soria) • Best Art Direction (€1000)
- 12th Muestra de Cine Independiente y Fantástico (Toledo) • Best Short Film

Special mention

- 8th Trieste Science+Fiction Festival

==== 2009 ====
Awards

- 15th Concurso de Cortos de Leioa Bizkaia (Leioa) • Second Best Short Film
- 6th VisualSound (Barcelona) • Best Short Film
- 21st U.S. Super 8 Film and Digital Video (Rutgers University) • Best Experimental Short Film
- 27th Uruguay International (Montevideo) • Best International Short Film
- 15th Trofeu Torretes "especial Mar" (Calella) • Best Short Amateur Argumentative/Fiction Film
- 3rd Mockfest (Hollywood) • Zelig Award (for Innovation in Mockumentary Filmmaking)
- 10th Torrelavega (Torrelavega) • Best Short Film - Video Section
- 5th Trayecto Corto (Velilla de San Antonio) • Best Art Direction
- 7th Caostica, (Bilbao) • Best Short Film - Video Section
- 13th Primavera Cinematográfica de Lorca (Murcia) • Second Best Short Film
- 5th Portello River (Padua) • Best Short Film
- 4th Sax International (Sax, Alicante) • Best Documentary Short Film
- 5th Cine Paradiso (Barrax) • Best Short Film
- 14th Certamen de Creación Audiovisual (Cabra) • Best Short Film (€2700)
- 2nd FicBueu (Bueu) • Best Art Direction (Ángel Boyano & Nino Morante) • Best Make-Up and Hairdressing (Isabel Avernheimer & Mayte González) • Best Costume Design (Ariadna Paniagua)
- 3rd Octubre de Por Barcelona Horror • Best Short Film
- 15th L'Étrange Festival (Paris) • Best Short Film
- 10th Buenos Aires Rojo Sangre • Best Short Film
- 6th Certamen de Documental e Vídeo Secuenciacero • Best Short Film
- 1st Pasado y Futuro (Almendralejo) • Second Best Short Film
- 10th Sonorama (Sonorama) • Jury Prize, Best Short Film
- 3rd CryptShow (Barcelona - Art Direction)

Special mentions

- 3rd Cambridge International Super 8 Festival (Cambridge)
- 5th Cortomenar Festival Nacional de Cortometrajes (Colmenar Viejo) Jury

==== 2010 ====
Awards

- Méliès d'Argent, presented at the 20th Espoo Ciné International
- 3rd Escorto Festival (El Escorial) • Best Art Direction • Best Editing • Best Soundtrack • Best Make-Up and Hairdressing • Best Costume Design
- 4th Short Shorts (Mexico City) • Best Cinematography
- 10th Certamen de Creación Joven Valencia Crea (Valencia) • Best Spanish Short Film
- 10th Vídeo Jove (Alella) • (Professionals) Fourth Best Short Film
- 6th Cine Corto de Tapiales (Tapiales) • Best Foreign Short Film
- 3rd Festerror (Cine de Terror y Fantástico, Lloret de Mar) • Best Short Film
- 8th FIKE - Évora International (Évora) • Organization Award
- 12th FEC (European Short), National Competition (Cambrils) • Second Best Short Film
- 7th MIDEC (Universidad de La Laguna) • Best Cinematography
- 10th Festival de Cine de Lanzarote (Lanzarote) • Best Spanish Short Film

Special mentions

- 6th Lago Film Fest (Lago, Calabria - Sui Generis Section)
- 8th International Super 8mm Festival (Szeged)

==== 2011 ====
Award

- 1st Bio-Fiction Science Art (Vienna) • Special Award of the Jury
