= The Dark Hour (2006 film) =

- Directed by: Elio Quiroga
- Written by: Elio Quiroga
- Produced by: Elio Quiroga, Margaret Nicoll, Jérôme Debève, Juan A. Ruiz, Sebastián Álvarez, Octavio Fernández-Roces
- Starring: Silke, Jorge Casalduero, Omar Muñoz
- Cinematography: Angel Luis Fernández (AEC)
- Edited by: Luis Sánchez-Gijón
- Music by: Alfons Conde
- Distributed by: Baditri
- Release date: 14 September 2007
- Running time: 93 minutes
- Country: Spain
- Language: Spanish

The Dark Hour (Spanish: La hora fría) is a 2007 Spanish science fiction film, written and directed by Elio Quiroga, and produced by Eqlipse Producciones Cinematográficas with Margaret Nicoll, Jérôme Debève and Juan A. Ruiz as associate producers.

== Plot ==
The film follows a group of eight people who living in a crumbling, unknown installation. They are survivors of a cataclysmic war. Maria (group leader), Pablo (her boyfriend), Jesus, Lucas, Mateo, Magda, and teen Ana all live together. Judas and Pedro (Maria's former lover) live away from the others. Jesus, the only young boy, films everything on a digicam. Jesus and Ana visit Judas in the basement whenever possible, as he treats them like adults. On the way to his room they pass decrepit corridors that are out of bounds, although Jesus leaves food for the "Solitary Child" that lives in the area.

Included throughout the film are in-universe propaganda films presented in a style reminiscent of 1950s American cartoons. These cartoon focus on the destruction of an unnamed enemy. Another film declares the enemy had developed a virus that destroys skin, making the infected victim constantly bleed but never die.

The survivors can't leave the complex and live in fear of the "Strangers" and "Invisibles" (only seen as a green mist in the corridors). The survivors' only defense is to cut the complex's power and heat; the Dark (or Cold) Hour of the title. The "Strangers" are the infected mentioned in the propaganda films. When food, medical supplies and ammunition begin to run out they must travel to a supply depot outside of their underground safe zone.

Pablo, Pedro and Lucas are chosen to get the supplies. Pablo is frightened when a Stranger begins stalking them. Pedro uses the confusion to push Pablo into a room full of Strangers, letting him become infected. Pablo's death devastates Maria and makes the other survivors question their future. Mateo wonders if it would be better if the group made a suicide pact instead of face such a bleak future.

The complex is then invaded by the Invisibles. Ana stumbles into the green mist and frantically tries to get into another room. Mateo rescues her and they kiss briefly.

The next day the Solitary Child shows up because his home was overrun by Strangers. As he is cleaned up by the children the others organize an attack on the Strangers. Magda learns of Mateo and Ana's kiss and slaps him for taking advantage. During the attack Mateo and Lucas are infected and killed by their comrades. A Stranger slips past them, though, and chases the children until he touches Jesus. The children escape and hide in a fridge until the others rescue them. Pedro wants to kill Jesus, but is stopped by the others. Unlike everyone else Jesus doesn't become infected. Maria later finds Pedro who has become paranoid and talks about the voices behind the walls. Maria tackles him and a shotgun is heard going off. Magda, Judas and the children find an armed Pedro and an injured Maria. While they talk Pedro stares into the distance, watching the Invisibles come up behind the survivors.

Pedro walks into the green lights while the others run away, supporting Maria. As they run they shoot at the lights. Coming to a garage Judas opens the doors and they run outside for the first time, where it's nighttime. They drop their weapons and sit in a town square, surrounded by Strangers. Jesus looks into his digicam and says they will have to join the Strangers, but at least it won't hurt.

Jesus looks at the sky where the Earth suddenly rises over the buildings. As the camera pulls back it's revealed that the complex is under a geodesic dome on the moon. The Earth is clearly surrounded by debris and is shown to be completely shattered to the core.

== Cast ==
- Silke as Maria
- Omar Muñoz as Jésus
- Pepo Oliva as Judas
- Carola Manzanares as Magda
- Jorge Casalduero as Pedro
- Julio Perillán as Pablo
- Nadia de Santiago as Ana

== Production ==
Spanish company La Huella Efectos Digitales were in charge of the visual effects in the film with Jérôme Debève and Juan A. Ruiz acting as supervisors. Over the last few years La Huella has specialized in spectacular computer generated effects, working on the movie Obaba and very successful television spots for Coca-Cola, Digital Plus, Metro de Madrid and Cheetos, among others.

The movie was produced by Margaret Nicoll as Executive Producer and Eqlipse; Quiroga's own production company, together with Televisión Española.

== Reception ==
HorrorNews said "Director and writer Elio Quiroga has a great sense of gloom mixed with drama that succeeds this sometimes slow moving movie. The combination of elements makes it for an interesting story and progression that is highly original on many levels while still staying familiar on others."
