= Fotos (film) =

- Theatrical release poster
- Directed by: Elio Quiroga
- Written by: Elio Quiroga
- Starring: Gustavo Salmerón; Mercedes Ortega; Miky Molina; Diana Peñalver; Myriam de Maeztu; Miguel Alonso; Carmelo Alcántara; Amparo Muñoz; Simón Andreu; María Asquerino
- Cinematography: Ángel Luis Fernández.
- Edited by: Juan Carlos R. Arroyo
- Music by: Carles Casas
- Production companies: Plot Films; Comunicación Integral
- Distributed by: Filmax
- Release dates: October 1996 (Sitges); 22 November 1996 (Spain)
- Country: Spain
- Language: Spanish

Fotos is a 1996 Spanish surreal melodrama film written and directed by Elio Quiroga (in his directorial debut feature) which stars Gustavo Salmerón, Mercedes Ortega, and Miky Molina.

== Plot ==
The plot follows the mishaps of sexually repressed and virgin young woman Azucena who breaks up with her boyfriend and is sexually attacked by plastic artist César. Guided by a Virgin apparition, she takes refuge in a club, where she falls for well-off transvestite stripper Narciso.

== Cast ==
- Gustavo Salmerón as Narciso
- Mercedes Ortega as Azucena
- Miky Molina as Jacinto
- Diana Peñalver as Paqui
- Myriam de Maeztu as Virgen
- Miguel Alonso as César
- Carmelo Alcántara as Gabriel
- Amparo Muñoz as Rosa
- Simón Andreu as Joaquín
- María Asquerino as madre de Azucena

== Production ==
Fotos is a Plot Films and Comunicación Integral production, and it had the collaboration of Sogedasa. Shooting locations included Jávea and Las Palmas de Gran Canaria. The film was scored by Carles Casas, edited by Juan Carlos R. Arroyo, and lensed by Ángel Luis Fernández.

== Release ==
The film was presented at the 29th Sitges Film Festival in October 1996. Distributed by Filmax, it was released theatrically in Spain on 22 November 1996. It has attained cult status.

== Reception ==
Casimiro Torreiro of El País described the film as "a truly spectacular cross between passionate soap opera, homosexual and ghostly iconography, and surreal religious provocation".

== Accolades ==
Year	Award	Category	Nominee(s)	Result	Ref.
1996	29th Sitges Film Festival	Best Screenplay		Won	
1996	29th Sitges Film Festival	Jury Special Prize		Won	

== See also ==
- List of Spanish films of 1996
