= Decapoda Shock =

- Film poster
- Directed by: Javier Chillon
- Written by: Javier Chillon; Luis Fuentes
- Story by: Javier Chillon
- Produced by: Javier Chillon; Luis Fuentes
- Starring: Federico Martín; Jaroslaw Bielski; Benito Sagredo; José Antonio Fuentes; Alexei Chillon; Pilar García
- Cinematography: Luis Fuentes
- Edited by: Javier Chillon; Luis Fuentes
- Music by: Cirilo Fernández
- Animation by: Javier Chillon
- Production company: Misterio
- Release dates: 9 September 2011 (L'Étrange Festival); October 2011 (Sitges)
- Running time: 9 minutes
- Country: Spain
- Language: Spanish
- Budget: €1500

Decapoda Shock is a 2011 Spanish short science fiction action parody film written, directed, co-produced, and with brief animated sequences by Javier Chillon. The film depicts an astronaut infected by an alien crab-like creature, transforming him into a decapod crustacean/human hybrid. Meanwhile, the astronaut's family has disappeared. Both events are the result of a sinister conspiracy, for which he seeks vengeance. As of 2019, Chillon's second film has been selected for more than 300 international film festivals, and received over thirty awards and honours within the first two years of its release, including a Méliès d'Argent.

== Synopsis ==
An astronaut explores the red dirt surface of an alien planet, where a crab-like creature reaches out of the soil and snips through his space suit. The infection that results transforms him into a cosmic decapod crustacean/human hybrid, with the head and claws of a crayfish or lobster. When he returns to Earth and tries to reconnect with his family, he discovers that he's been the victim of a sinister conspiracy, and takes revenge on those responsible for his family's disappearance.

== Cast ==
Actors

- Federico Martín • Hombre-Cangrejo Man ("Crab Man" or "Crayfish Man")
- Benito Sagredo • Astronaut
- José Antonio Fuentes • Eric Gibraltar
- Alexey Chillon • Son
- Pilar García • Mother

Voice

- Jaroslaw Bielski • Astronaut Voice

== Themes ==
Decapoda Shock shares a number of themes with Javier Chillon's first film, Die Schneider Krankheit: monstrous creatures resulting from "spatial" mutations or genetic manipulation, primarily derived from the science fiction B movies of the 1950s, the "atomic age".

== Production ==
=== Background and financing ===
Less than a year after the release of Javier Chillon's very successful first short film, Die Schneider Krankheit (2008), a film that includes the "Hollywood look of the 50s" among its influences, Chillon was in Paris pitching a project called Outfinite, which would "pay tribute to sci-fi B movies and blaxploitation pics." The film that became Decapoda Shock was ultimately self-produced by Chillon and his friend Luis Fuentes, who was also the cinematographer on Die Schneider Krankheit; as before, they relied on themselves and on their "very talented friends" for support: "we didn't have much money to spend (the final budget was around 1500€) so we made everything ourselves or called our friends for help." The film was made for far less money than Die Schneider Krankheit, and was also less time-consuming; the director's love of the American B movie genre he imitates in these films happens also to be a way to get a film made on a limited budget.

=== Development and writing ===
Chillon wanted to "make something very different" from his previous film: "There were very different things that I wanted to try and, in a way, I wrote the script to accommodate all of them in a wacky story. I spent two years in the making of the film." The director allowed himself more spontaneity and improvisation this time around, shooting without a fleshed out script: there was a "concise idea" but the story elements were added gradually over time, "on the fly".

=== Filming ===
Decapoda Shock was filmed between July 2009 and March 2011 in Guadalajara, Spain and Madrid, using an HDV camera, the Canon XL-H1, "because a friend owned it and we could borrow it any time we needed it during these two years." Unlike the previous film, it was shot in colour, with orange the "main dominant" and also the main colour "for clothes, props, and so on", with a view to achieving "a kind of a comic book feeling." The reason the film took so long to shoot was the range of "locations and different actors and the tight budget"; as an example, the first scene with the astronaut was shot in the course of one year using three different locations and three different actors (two of them for the hands).

== Release ==
Decapoda Shock had its premiere at L'Étrange Festival in Paris on 9 September 2011. Its Spanish premiere was at the Sitges International Fantastic Film Festival in October. In October 2013, it was selected by Peter Kuplowsky at the Toronto After Dark Film Festival as a standout for the internet premiere of Fangoria Magazine's Screamers short film series. As of 2019, the film had been selected for more than 330 international film festivals.

=== Home media ===
Decapoda Shock and the director's first film, Die Schneider Krankheit, appear as bonus material on a Spanish-subtitled DVD of Daniel Cockburn's 2010 feature film, You Are Here.

=== Online platform ===
The film is available in its entirety on Vimeo.

== Reception ==
=== Critical response ===
Robert Barry reviewed Decapoda Shock after seeing it at its premiere, saying it "mixed an inventive and articulate use of 'real' cinematography with the freedom of expression afforded by occasional intrusions of animation"; he voted for it in the audience prize in the festival's short film competition. A statement by the Fanonmenon jury awarding the Silver Méliès to the film at the Leeds International Film Festival, gives the reasons why it was chosen: "Decapoda Shock was very creative and achieved a lot in a short space of time – hilarious storytelling, strong pastiche techniques, multi-media visualisation and displayed a passion for the genre." Adrienne Fox remarks that Chillón taps into revenge films, spaghetti westerns, and exploitation films "with some screaming guitar to make a very memorable short." Describing the film as coming "from way the heck out in left field", Paul Bowers suggests despite the plot making "only halfway" sense, it's "fine", and: "You'll be too enraptured by the horror-schlocky camera cuts, animated depictions of evil government cabals, and close-up shots of gored anonymous henchmen to put all the pieces together anyway." Kate Williamson and Gem Carmella say the film does what it deliberately sets out to do: "confuse, shock, surprise, and most importantly, to make fun of itself"; initially, it passes itself off as "a badly made but serious film", but "its cheap feel is actually the result of a precise and perfectly executed set of technical considerations. Quite simply, you’ve got to be pretty good at what you do to make something look this bad"; the film is a "master class in parody". Similarly, Samantha Hautea calls the film "a celebration of the absurd", "tying in various film clichés". Andrew Robertson said "once you have seen it you cannot help but measure every film you have ever seen against it ... The colour-palette is washed and perfect, and the high-drama and STAGGERING ACTION are such that one cannot help but reach for the hyphen and CAPS LOCK keys."

=== Accolades ===
Decapoda Shock received over thirty awards and honours within the first two years of its release.

2011

Awards

- Méliès d'Argent (Short Film), Fanomenon (EFFFF, presented at Leeds)
- Fantastic Fest • Best Fantastic Short Film
- Knoxville Horror (Knoxville) • Palm D'Gore (Jury award)
- Cinefantasy (São Paulo) • Best Science-Fiction Short Film
- Cine Corto de Tapiales (Tapiales) • Best International Short Film
- HorrorVision Spanish Horror-Trash Festival (Barcelona) • Best Short Film

Special mention

- Festival de Cortos del Barbú (Madrid)

2012

Awards

- Muestra de Cine de Terror, Fantástico y Gore (Alcantarilla) • Jury Prize • 2nd Audience Award
- Mostra de Cinema Jove d'Elx (Elche) • Best Original Screenplay
- Festerror (Cine de Terror y Fantástico Lloret de Mar) • 3rd Prize (Audience Award)
- Caostica (Bilbao) • Best Short Film (Bizarro section)
- Festival de Cine Propio (Madrid) • Best Short Film • Best Director • Best Screenplay
- Festival of Nations (Lenzing) • Diploma
- Open Cinema International Short and Animation (Saint Petersburg) • SKIF Special Award
- Picknic Festival (Santander, Spain) • Best Digital Short Film
- Offanengo (Offanengo) • Best International Short Film
- Cortonogara (Nogara) • Best Short Film
- Abycine Cortos (Albacete) • Second Best Short Film
- Post Mortem (Aguascalientes) • Best International Short Film
- Buried Alive (Atlanta) • Mind Fuck Award

Special mentions

- Villanova in Corto, (Bagnacavallo) • Best Editing
- Strawberry Shorts (Cambridge)
- Riviera Maya Underground (Playa del Carmen)
- Acocollona't (Girona)

2013

Awards

- Winter Shorts (Somerset, Kentucky) Foreign Special merit awards • Editing • Special Effects
- U.S. Super 8 Film and Digital Video (Rutgers University) • Best Experimental Short Film
- Peculiar (Peculiar, Missouri) • Most Peculiar Film Award
- RATMA (River Aire Ten Minute Amateur) (Keighley) Sci-Fi Short Film Runner Up
- Vagrant (Belarus) • Audience Award
- British Horror (London) • Best Music
- Suspiria (Alicante) • Best Fantastic Short Film
- Certamen de Documental e Vídeo Secuencia Cero (Vigo) • Best Short Film

Special mention

- Fanterror (Asturias)
