= Elio Quiroga =

Spanish film director and screenwriter

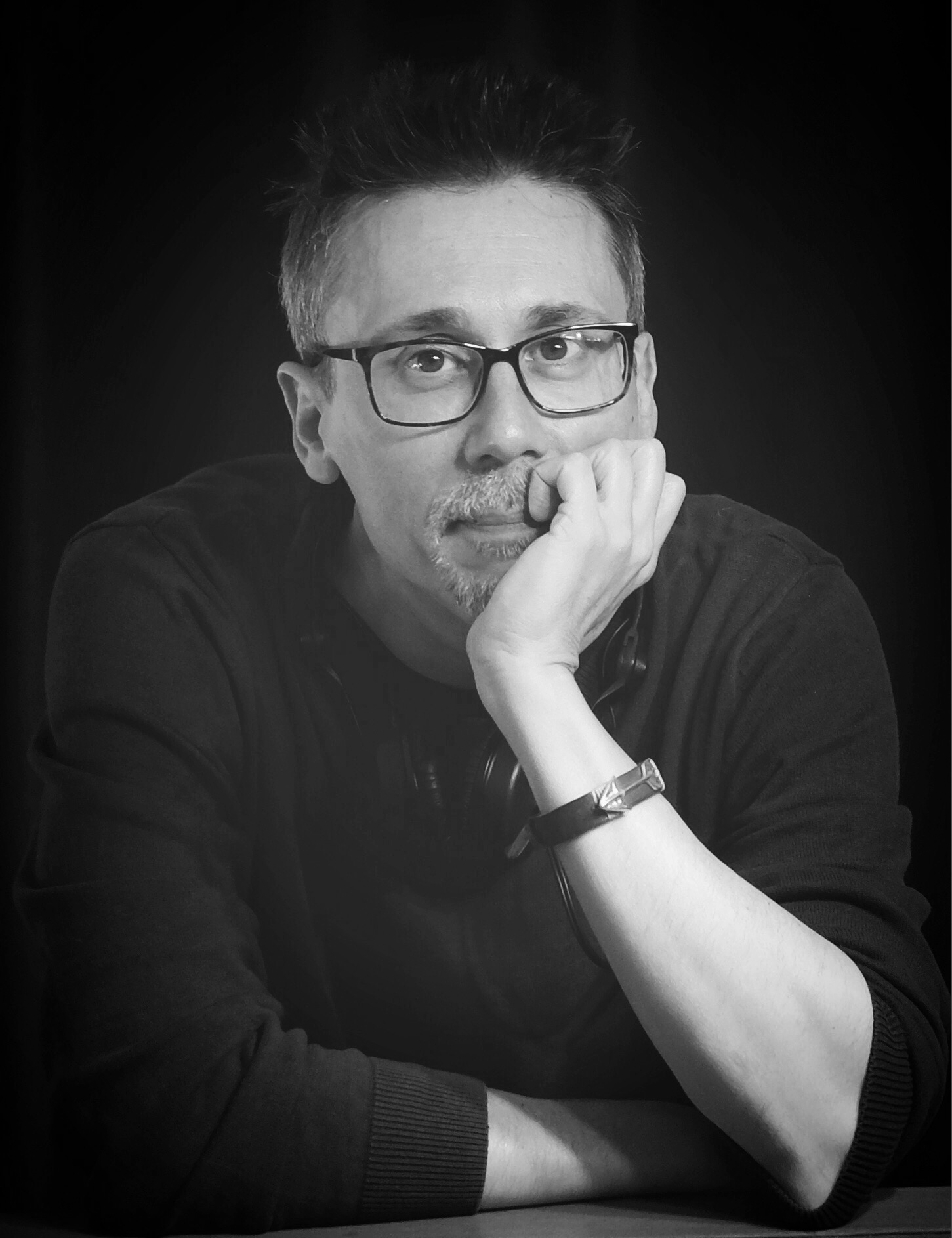
- Quiroga in 2019 by Óscar Fernández Orengo
- Born: Elio Quiroga Rodríguez; Las Palmas de Gran Canaria, Spain
- Education: University of Las Palmas de Gran Canaria
- Occupations: Writer; screenwriter; film director

Elio Quiroga Rodríguez is a Spanish filmmaker and writer from the Canary Islands. His work is primarily devoted to the fantasy genre.

== Life and career ==
Born in Las Palmas, Elio Quiroga Rodríguez earned a degree in informatics from the University of Las Palmas de Gran Canaria. His debut feature film as a director, surreal melodrama Fotos (1996), is considered to have attained cult status. It was followed by The Dark Hour (2006), The Haunting (2009), the documentary The Mystery of the King of Kinema (2015), and La estrategia del pequinés (2019). He has also directed short films, including Sirena negra, El último minutero (which earned a nomination for the Goya Award for Best Documentary Short Film), and Whence comes the rain.

As a fiction writer, he has penned novels such as Los que sueñan, Niños del sol, Astral and Tiempo sucio.
