= The Haunting (2009 film) =

- Theatrical release poster
- Spanish: NO-DO
- Directed by: Elio Quiroga
- Written by: Elio Quiroga
- Produced by: Elio Quiroga
- Starring: Ana Torrent; Francisco Boira; Héctor Colomé; Alfonsa Rosso; Miriam Cepa; Rocío Muñoz; Paco Casares
- Cinematography: Juan Carlos Gómez
- Edited by: Luis Sánchez-Gijón
- Music by: Alfons Conde
- Production company: Eqlipse Producciones Cinematográficas S.L.
- Distributed by: EuroVideo
- Release dates: March 2009 (Las Palmas); 12 June 2009 (Spain)
- Running time: 94 minutes
- Country: Spain
- Language: Spanish

The Haunting or The Beckoning (Spanish: NO-DO) is a Spanish supernatural mystery horror film written and directed by Elio Quiroga which stars Ana Torrent.

== Plot ==
The plot follows the plight of Francesca, a pediatrician coping with the sudden death of her baby who moves to a countryside manor with her husband Pedro to seek solace and recovery from her trauma. Once there, she starts to experience disturbing supernatural phenomena instead. The supernatural mystery is connected to the existence of a B-side of "secret" NO-DO newsreels commissioned by the Francoist regime (and hidden by the Catholic Church) recording every miraculous development in Spain and which ended up stumbling upon some dark gods.

== Cast ==
- Ana Torrent as Francesca
- Francisco Boira as Pedro
- Héctor Colomé as Miguel
- Alfonsa Rosso as Blanca
- Miriam Cepa as Rosa
- Rocío Muñoz as Jean
- Francisco Casares as Gabriel
- Aitor Gaviria as Senel
- Lucía Navarro as Paqui
- Alejandra Lorenzo as niña

== Production ==
An Eqlipse Producciones Cinematográficas production, the film had the financial support from Canarias Cultura en Red and the collaboration of TVE, ICAA, Cabildo de Gran Canaria and Las Palmas de Gran Canaria International Film Festival.

== Release ==
The film was presented in March 2009 at Las Palmas Film Festival. It was theatrically released in Spain on 12 June 2009.

== Reception ==
The review in Fotogramas rated the film 3 out of 5 stars, deeming it to be an "appreciable" new wrinkle to the cinema of Arrebato, Buñuel's catholic anti-clericalism and Don Coscarelli's plot twists, also highlighting the performance by Torrent.

The review in El Mundo rated the film 2 out of 5 stars, writing about a film full of flaws, generally attributable to the screenplay and, above all, to the budget shortcomings, otherwise featuring an "uneven but very entertaining story" and positively highlighting the insertion of a chapter with historical plausibility within a traditional horror story.

Jordi Costa of El País considered that even if there are some predictable twists and a few missteps and the film suffers from budgetary constraints, "this story of martyrs and monstrous gods" "deserves to find its audience".

== See also ==
- List of Spanish films of 2009
