= Julio Perillán =

American actor

Julio Perillán Gandarias
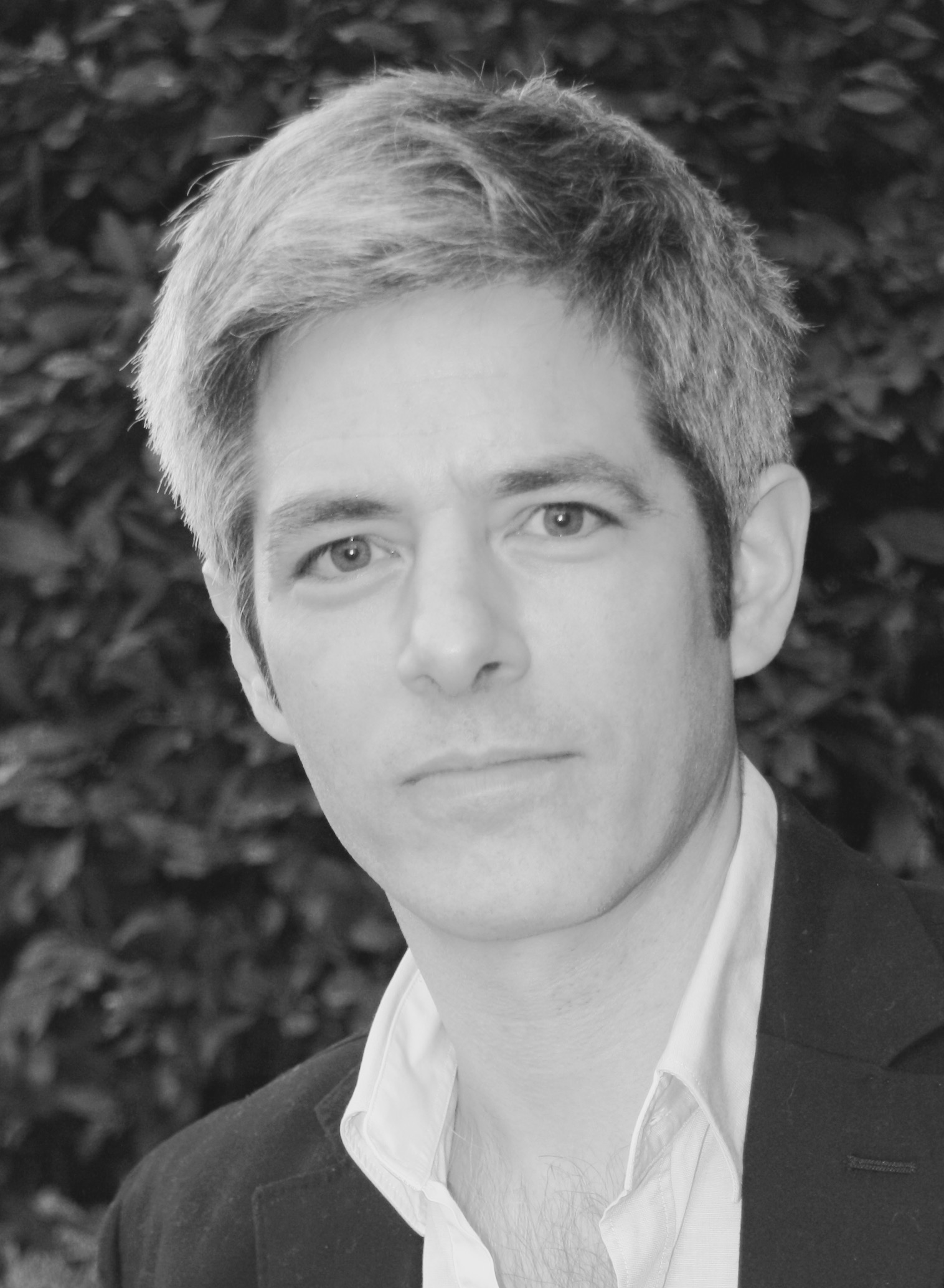
- Perillán in 2017
- Born: September 8, 1973 (age 52); Bethesda, Maryland
- Citizenship: United States; Spain
- Occupation: Actor
- Years active: 1998–present

Julio Perillán Gandarias (born September 8, 1973) is an American actor of Spanish descent.

== Biography ==
Perillán was born and raised in Bethesda, Maryland, on the outskirts of Washington, DC, the third of four children of two immigrants from Spain. Since he was born to Spanish parents in the US, Perillán holds dual citizenship of both the United States and Spain. He graduated with a degree in physics from the University of Maryland, College Park.

After his father died in 1996 he moved to Los Angeles, California to study film and acting. In 1998 he started his career as an actor, appearing in plays such as Fool for Love (Madrid Theatre), The Masque of Poe (Sacred Fools Theater Company), and Walk of Fame Café (Danville, Virginia).

Perillán's first film appearance was in the independent film Eden's Curve in 2003. After this, he moved to Spain to care for his paternal grandparents and look for work in the Spanish film industry.

His first job in Spain was a lead role in Fragile (2004), directed by Basque filmmaker Juanma Bajo Ulloa. He has subsequently appeared in films including The Dark Hour and Woody Allen's Vicky Cristina Barcelona. His role as Max Linder in the documentary The Mystery of the King of Kinema got him nominated as best lead actor for the 2016 Goya film awards.

He has appeared on Spanish television in Los Ochenta and El comisario on Telecinco, Hospital Central on Antena3, and Cuéntame cómo pasó (TVE).

He lives between Madrid, New York City and Los Angeles.

== Filmography ==
=== Movies ===
Year	Title	Director
2017	Sister of Mine	
2016	Ignacio de Loyola	Paolo Dy
2014	The Mystery of the King of Kinema	Elio Quiroga
2008	NO-DO	Elio Quiroga
2008	Vicky Cristina Barcelona	Woody Allen
2008	ASD, Alma Sin Dueño	Tinieblas González
2007	K Il Bandito	Martin Donovan
2006	The Dark Hour	Elio Quiroga
2006	Moscow Zero	María Lidón
2004	Malas temporadas	Manuel Martín Cuenca
2003	Fragile	Juanma Bajo Ulloa
2002	Eden's Curve	Anne Misawa
2001	The Decay of Fiction	Pat O'Neill

=== Shorts ===
Año	Película	Director
2007	New Romantics	Alauda Ruíz de Azúa
2005	La Carta	Carles Vila
2005	Chico Meets Chica	Samuel P. Abrams
2005	Otra Vida	Juana Macías

=== Television ===
- Hospital Central: Serie de Antena3 2009
- Cuéntame cómo pasó: Serie de TVE 2003–2005
- El Comisario: Serie de Telecinco 2005
- Crusader, TV Movie de Carlos Arribau 2004
- Los 80: Serie de Telecinco 2004

=== Theatre shows ===
- Walk of Fame Cafe, producido por Stick Film Productions(2005)
- Fool for Love, Madrid Theatre(2000)
- The Masque of Poe, Sacred Fools Theater Company (1998)
- Beowulf and Grendel, Theatre West (1999)
