= Latronico =

Latronico Greek: Latomeío
- Comune
- Comune di Latronico
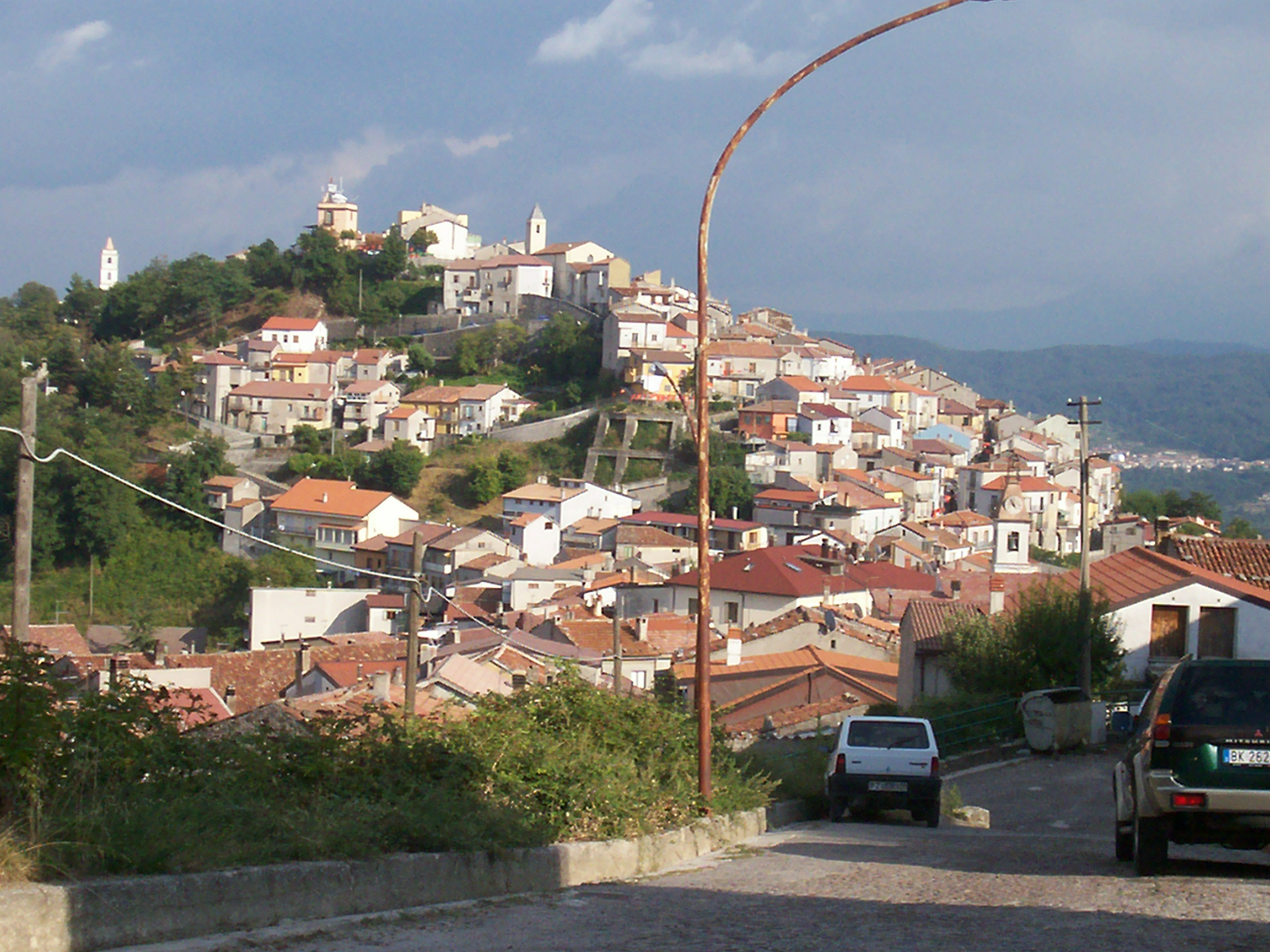
- View of Latronico

- Location within Italy Location within Basilicata
- Coordinates: 40°5′24″N 16°0′39″E
- Country: Italy
- Region: Basilicata
- Province: Potenza (PZ)
- Frazioni: Agromonte Magnano, Agromonte Mileo, Battista, Calda, Cerri, Fraccia-Laghi, Iannazzo, Ischitelli, Lucarelli, Mastroluca, Masullo, Pargo, Pantoni, Papaleo, Perosa, Perricchio, Preti, Procoio, Serrone, Varrazzo

Government
  - Mayor: Fausto Alberto De Maria

Area
  - Total: 76.66 km^{2} (29.60 sq mi)
- Elevation: 888 m (2,913 ft)

Population (June 2023)
  - Total: 4,032
  - Density: 52.60/km^{2} (136.2/sq mi)
- Demonym: Latronichesi
- Time zone: UTC+1 (CET)
  - Summer (DST): UTC+2 (CEST)
- Postal code: 85043
- Dialing code: 0973
- ISTAT code: 076040
- Patron saint: St. Giles
- Saint day: 1 September
- Website: Official website

Latronico (Latronichese: Latruonicu) is a town and comune in the province of Potenza, in the Southern Italian region of Basilicata. Due to its high elevation of 888 metres (2,913 ft) it is much cooler, even in summer, than the larger cities along the coasts.

The current mayor is Fausto Alberto De Maria.

== Climate ==
Climate data for Latronico (1991–2020)
Month	Jan	Feb	Mar	Apr	May	Jun	Jul	Aug	Sep	Oct	Nov	Dec	Year
Mean daily maximum °C (°F)	6.9 (44.4)	7.3 (45.1)	10.2 (50.4)	13.5 (56.3)	17.9 (64.2)	22.7 (72.9)	26.0 (78.8)	26.1 (79.0)	21.0 (69.8)	17.0 (62.6)	12.1 (53.8)	7.8 (46.0)	15.7 (60.3)
Daily mean °C (°F)	4.6 (40.3)	4.7 (40.5)	7.2 (45.0)	10.1 (50.2)	14.3 (57.7)	18.8 (65.8)	21.4 (70.5)	22.0 (71.6)	17.6 (63.7)	14.0 (57.2)	9.6 (49.3)	5.6 (42.1)	12.5 (54.5)
Mean daily minimum °C (°F)	2.3 (36.1)	2.1 (35.8)	4.1 (39.4)	6.7 (44.1)	10.7 (51.3)	14.9 (58.8)	17.3 (63.1)	17.9 (64.2)	14.1 (57.4)	11.0 (51.8)	7.1 (44.8)	3.4 (38.1)	9.3 (48.7)
Average precipitation mm (inches)	128.0 (5.04)	85.0 (3.35)	84.0 (3.31)	76.4 (3.01)	63.1 (2.48)	37.4 (1.47)	32.7 (1.29)	34.9 (1.37)	71.3 (2.81)	88.6 (3.49)	129.5 (5.10)	103.9 (4.09)	934.8 (36.80)
Average precipitation days (≥ 1 mm)	9.5	8.8	9.2	9.3	7.4	4.6	4.1	4.3	7.5	7.9	10.2	11.5	94.3
Average relative humidity (%)	78.8	76.4	72.9	71.4	70.9	67.6	64.6	64.5	70.8	75.0	78.5	79.4	72.6
Average dew point °C (°F)	1.2 (34.2)	0.5 (32.9)	1.9 (35.4)	4.3 (39.7)	8.5 (47.3)	11.9 (53.4)	13.3 (55.9)	13.5 (56.3)	11.6 (52.9)	9.3 (48.7)	5.9 (42.6)	2.5 (36.5)	7.0 (44.6)
Source: NOAA
