= Benni Diez =

- Born: 19 November 1979 (age 46); Starnberg, Bavaria, Germany
- Education: Film Academy Baden-Württemberg
- Occupations: Film director, film producer, CEO
- Years active: 2003–present
- Awards: Shine Award; Méliès d'Argent
- Website: bennidiez.com

Benjamin "Benni" Diez is a German filmmaker and electronic musician, known for his darkly themed short films Pressure Bolt and Kingz, and his debut romantic horror comedy feature Stung.

== Education and filmmaking career ==
Born in 1979 in Starnberg, Germany, Diez developed a love for horror and science fiction filmmaking in the early 1990s. In a 2015 interview, Diez said: "I always felt like I'm a filmmaker at heart. I always made my own movies when I was young." He began teaching himself computer animation when he was fourteen, using "the very first computer animation program."

Diez worked for agencies and production companies in Bavaria, and made his own videos before enrolling at Baden-Württemberg Film Academy, in Ludwigsburg, in 2002, specialising in visual effects and animation. He said the video Bullet – Highway Patrol (2002), made in three days "from idea to finished clip", was what got him into the academy.

=== Student filmmaker (2002–2007) ===
Diez had chosen his area of specialisation knowing it was rare that a directing student "could make sci-fi and horror films"; he "consciously chose effects" despite this, and, "I was lucky enough to do whatever I wanted and still direct live action stuff for my projects."

Making genre films always interested me, and it's sometimes hard, especially in Germany, when you study directing, to do crazy genre stuff. You try to go the more serious, dramatic way, which is not wrong, but would have been wrong for me. So I deliberately decided to study effects because I knew I could still direct my own stuff.

==== Short films ====
During his first year at the film academy, Diez collaborated with fellow student Marinko Spahić on a short mixed live action animation film titled Druckbolzen (Pressure Bolt, 2003), starring Benjamin Biehn and made for €250. The short played at several European international film festivals, winning an award at Aubagne for sound in 2003, and the Shine Award at Bradford, for technical innovation in 2004. Ain't It Cool News called Pressure Bolt "stunning" and "quite possibly the best film ever made for under five hundred bucks". Diez teamed with Biehn again, as screenwriter, to make a short comic horror movie titled Martha (2004) starring Monika Manz and Hermann Schevtschenko. Diez and Spahić collaborated again in 2004 on a short science fiction film, 90 Grad Different, starring Steffen Wink. That summer, they began their third and longest project together, a thesis film, an alien invasion thriller with hip hop and gangster rap motifs; the title, Kingz (2007) is derived from hip hop slang. The twenty-minute film stars Mathis Landwehr and pop music stars Bela B, Olli Banjo, and Claire Oelkers, and features martial arts, swordplay, and gunfighting. It was shown at international film festivals, winning Best Short Film at Trieste S+F in 2008 and a Méliès d'Argent in 2009. Todd Brown praised the cinematography and called Diez "an effects god"; the film "fuses a bit of gang culture with bits of horror, scifi, and martial arts action and does it all remarkably well... Landwehr gets time to show his moves and the whole thing just fits together beautifully and cries out to be made into a feature." Five years later, Brown recalled: "that short was far and away one of the best I saw in that year, an amazing blend of scifi, action and horror elements that made me a fan for life."

==== Commercial work ====
While studying, Diez did post-production work on films and advertisements for, among other brands, Festina, Audi, Bosch, and Snickers.

=== Kingz Entertainment CEO (2007–2011) ===
After graduating with a diploma in visual effects and animation, Diez served as CEO for the Cologne-based production company founded for and named after Kingz from 2008 to 2011. Kingz Entertainment provides visual effects for commercials (for Toshiba and Shell, among others). Diez reused footage from an advertisement made for the International Film School Cologne, Keine billigen Tricks (2009), to create a new short of his own, Space Chase.

Noncommercial work for which Diez provided editing or visual effects included zombie web series Viva Berlin!, Marissa Maghavipata's short film Singularity, and feature films, notably Lars von Trier's Melancholia.

There's a handful of shots where Kiefer Sutherland and his son construct this little wire thing, where they look into the sky, onto the approaching planet, and they create a circle out of wire so they can compare the size and can determine how fast it's approaching. We did a few of those shots because everything behind that wire had to be rotoscoped out and the planet had to be put in, which are fairly small shots, but they were quite difficult to do because pretty much everything had to be painted out and replaced by another background planet. But it was a fun little job, and it was for a great movie.

In 2011, Diez decided that working on commercials took too much time away from being a filmmaker, and left the company to go back to freelancing and pursuing his own projects.

=== Independent feature filmmaker (2011–present) ===
==== Debut feature ====
When Benni Diez read Adam Arresty's script for Stung, it "called" to him, "on a few very profound levels, mainly to my inner child that watched Alien way too young and got messed up in the brain by it a little bit."

I knew if I was ever going to do a feature film, this was going to be my first, because it's just perfect. It has every element I love about drama. It has the scope where I would dare start really directing actors. Because it's not an ensemble with a dozen characters that have a lot of nuance, it's very compact.

The project took about three and a half years to complete. Stung is a 2015 German-American independent romantic comic horror film starring Matt O'Leary, Jessica Cook, Lance Henriksen, Clifton Collins Jr., Cecilia Pillado and Eve Slatner.

==== Projects in development ====
Diez has been named variously as a producer or co-director for the third installment of the Skyline series, Skylines, currently in production with release anticipated in 2020.

== Musical career ==
Diez has been making his own electronic music since about the same time he started making films.

== Filmography ==
=== Short noncommercial films and videos ===
- Buck Bölkers (1995)
- Bullet – Highway Patrol (2002)
- Pressure Bolt (2003)
- Martha (2004)
- 90 Grad Different (2004)
- Kingz (2007)
- Bronko Bros. (2008), concept trailer
- Space Chase (2009)

=== Feature films ===
- Stung (2015)
- Skylines (2020)
