= Kingz (film) =

- Film poster
- Directed by: Benni Diez & Marinko Spahić
- Written by: Benni Diez & Marinko Spahić
- Produced by: Marinko Spahić (associate producer: Benni Diez)
- Starring: Olli Banjo; Mathis Landwehr; Claire Oelkers; Bela B. Felsenheimer; Ben Schamma; Frank Zube; Christian Gneiẞl; Marsul Stefanec
- Cinematography: Oliver Staubi
- Edited by: Benni Diez; Marinko Spahić
- Music by: Patrizio Deidda
- Production companies: Kingz Entertainment; Filmakademie Baden-Württemberg; 13th Street
- Distributed by: Unstable Ground (Galaxy of Horrors)
- Release date: 2007
- Running time: 20 minutes
- Country: Germany
- Language: German

Kingz is a 2007 German short action science-fiction horror film created by Benni Diez and Marinko Spahić about two young thugs (Olli Banjo and Mathis Landwehr) who go to a nightclub to close out a drug deal only to find something is not quite right about some of the patrons, including the owner (Bela B); the ensuing mayhem involves martial arts, swordplay, and gunfighting. The short film was shown at international film festivals and won a Méliès d'Argent in 2009.

In 2017, Kingz received a general theatrical release through its inclusion in the Canadian science-fiction horror anthology film, Galaxy of Horrors.

== Plot ==
Olli (Olli Banjo) and Mathis (Mathis Landwehr), two small-time criminals are just about to make their first big deal as middle men. Mathis is nervous, while Olli is happily anticipating a big payment. All they have to do is get into an underground club, deliver a package to a local drug dealer, collect the money for the buyer and receive their fee.

They enter the club to see the owner, but they are told that he does not receive any guests. Tensions rise as Olli starts arguing with the unwelcoming bartender (Frank Zube) who says he will make the deal. Mathis accepts this, and the man pays them and takes the package. Olli and Mathis head for the exit, but just then Olli recognises his younger sister Nadine (Claire Oelkers). Before Mathis knows it, Olli goes to get Nadine out of there, shouting loudly.

Unbeknownst to either of them, all the while, the club owner, Luca (Bela B), has been occupied stalking Nadine among the crowd. Too late, Mathis realises what is going on, but before he can reach Olli and Nadine, Luca has sent his guards to take both of them. Mathis tries to follow them, but is stopped by the now openly armed bartender. A fight ensues and quickly escalates into a brawl. Then the real trouble begins. Just as Olli and Nadine's bid to escape seems about to succeed, the strange club's secret is revealed: not everyone there is human. And not everyone will leave it alive...

== Cast ==
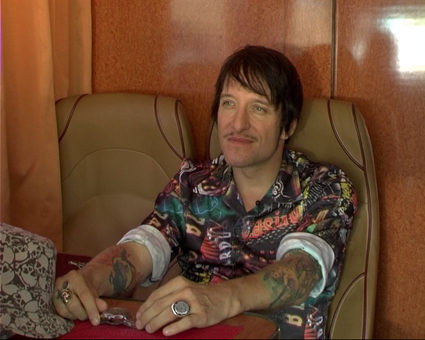
Bela B (Dirk Felsenheimer), credited in Kingz with a mashup of his real and stage names, in 2007

Main

- Olli Banjo as Olli
- Mathis Landwehr as Mathis
- Claire Oelkers as Nadine
- Bela B. Felsenheimer as Luca

Supporting

- Ben Schamma as Bouncer
- Frank Zube as Bartender
- Christian Gneiẞl as Villain
- Marsul Stefanec as Villain

== Production ==
=== Background ===
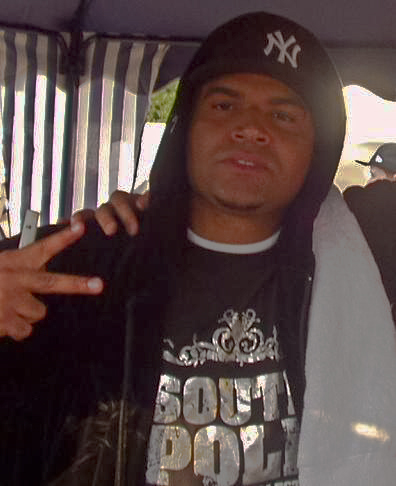
Olli Banjo in 2006

Benni Diez developed a love for horror and science-fiction filmmaking in the early 1990s, and worked for agencies and production companies in Bavaria before enrolling at Filmakademie Baden-Württemberg in 2002, where he specialised in visual effects and animation. There, he first collaborated with Marinko Spahić, another student at Baden-Württemberg, on a short mixed live action animation film titled Druckbolzen (Pressure Bolt, 2003), made for €250.

=== Development and writing ===
In the summer of 2004, Diez and Spahić decided that their next project (and thesis) should be a live action thriller, a compelling alien invasion story with modern elements, especially hip hop and gangster rap, the title Kingz being a form of hip hop slang. The script underwent several rewrites, "and they had still no appropriate names for the two main characters"; in the end they used the names of the actors. Diez would serve as CEO for the production company founded for and named after the film, Kingz Entertainment, from 2008 to 2011, specialising in visual effects, working on commercials and feature films, notably Lars von Trier's Melancholia.

=== Casting and characters ===
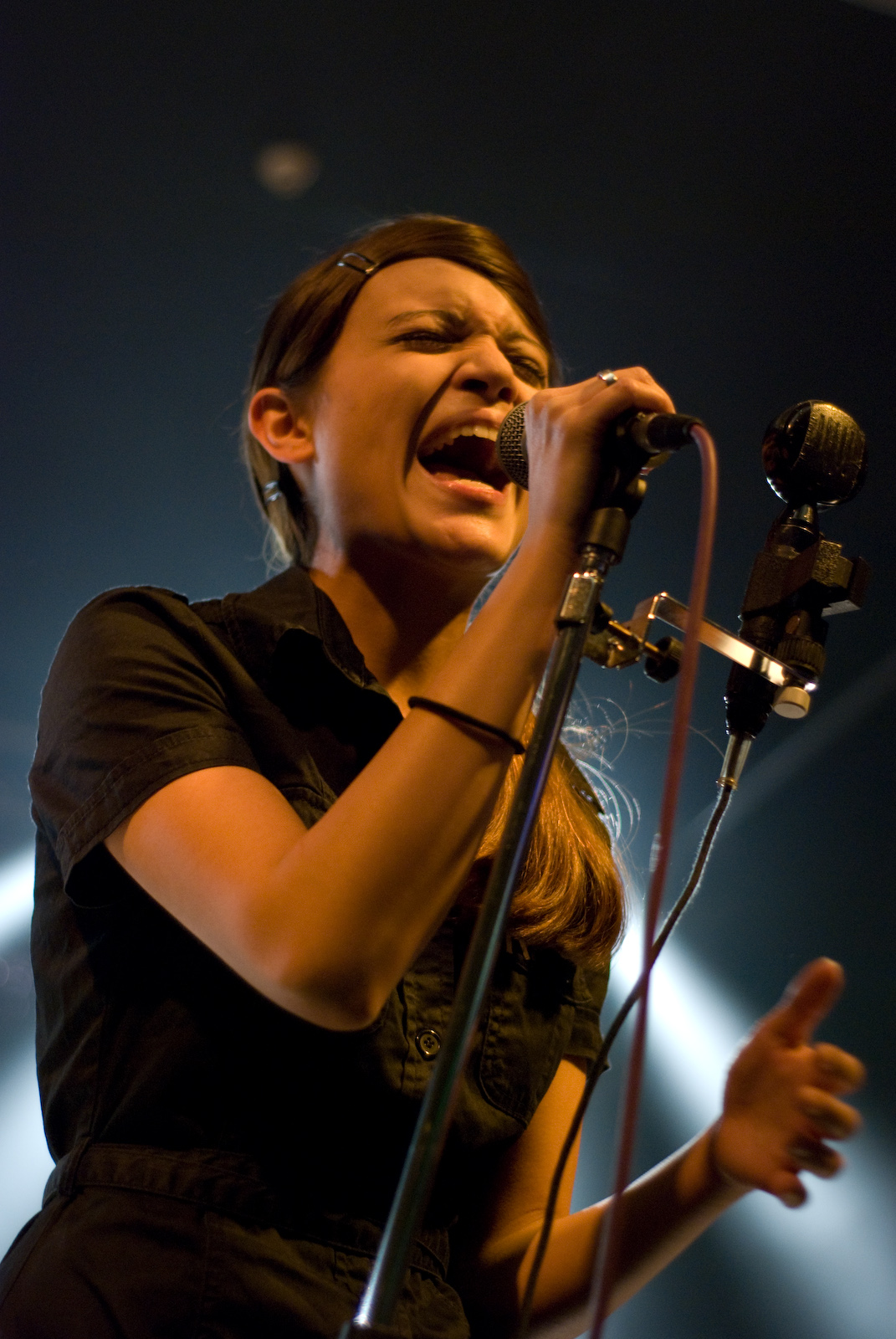
Claire Oelkers in 2007

Mathis Landwehr was the first actor cast; Diez knew him from another production, and the actor's earlier work in the Kampfansage short films, his martial arts and stunt abilities making him an obvious choice (he choreographed the action scenes himself and had connections with excellent stunt performers, two of whom were cast for the film).

The student filmmakers managed to land three German pop music stars. Kingz was German hip hop musician Olli Banjo's debut film. His character had been difficult to cast until it was decided to find someone who was active in hip hop, as opposed to an actor trying to mimic the look and style; Banjo's appearance and backstory were what they were looking for, and fortunately for them he was both available for principal photography and was agreeable to trying something new. A similar story applies with respect to the role of Nadine, Olli's little sister: she had to look young and innocent on the one hand, but also be an experienced actress, as her character undergoes severe psychological stress. After going through many casting agencies, Spahić came across a photograph of Claire Oelkers. Her "unique appearance" and her feature film experience made her perfect for the role. The character of Luca was, from very early on, written with "rock icon" Bela B in mind, and, by this point, the filmmakers thought: "Why not simply ask him?" as with Banjo, he liked the script and he had the time.

== Release ==
Kingz was submitted as a thesis film, and released in 2007. The short went on to be screened on the international film festival circuit for a few years. In 2009, in Trieste, it won one of the most prestigious awards for science fiction, the Méliès d'Argent.

=== Broadcasts ===
Kingz was the first fictional short film ever to be shown on MTV Germany, at thirty minutes past midnight, Hallowe'en night, 2007.

The short was televised a little over a year later as part of 13th Street's Shocking Shorts lineup, on 10 December 2008.

=== Anthology film ===
Kingz is included in the 2017 Canadian science-fiction horror anthology film Galaxy of Horrors, which comprises eight shorts within a larger narrative frame in which a man awakens from a cryogenic sleep pod and is forced to watch the shorts as entertainment while his damaged life-support runs out. The anthology film had its premiere in Toronto at Imagine Cinemas Carlton on March 1, 2017. the feature was conceived by Little Terrors short films festival founder Justin McConnell, who directed the narrative frame, and Indiecan Entertainment's Avi Federgreen. The production is the second collaboration between Rue Morgue Cinema and Little Terrors, following Minutes Past Midnight.

=== Home media and streaming ===
Kingz appears as one of the extras on the Saw films DVD collections.

The Galaxy of Horrors anthology was released on DVD and special edition Blu-ray in 2017. The anthology was made available through various video on demand options on the IndieCan Entertainment website, on March 7, 2017, and on Amazon Prime.

=== Online platform ===
Kingz is currently available for viewing in its entirety on YouTube.

== Reception ==
=== Critical response ===
Todd Brown praised the cinematography and called Diez "an effects god"; the film "fuses a bit of gang culture with bits of horror, scifi, and martial arts action and does it all remarkably well... Landwehr gets time to show his moves and the whole thing just fits together beautifully and cries out to be made into a feature." Five years later, when Diez had begun principal photography on his first feature, Stung, Brown recalled of Kingz: "that short was far and away one of the best I saw in that year, an amazing blend of scifi, action and horror elements that made me a fan for life." Karina Adelgaard, reviewing the film in its 2017 anthology release, was "really surprised" that the film was ten years old: "It definitely feels very contemporary." She also enjoyed what she said was a reference to Ellen Ripley from Alien.

Reviewing Kingz when it was screened as part of the 2008 Fantastic Fest Online, Jude Felton compared it favourably to From Dusk till Dawn and Botched, saying it did well, especially given the short length:

It's well shot, with some excellent camera, and is very slick looking throughout... the cast do a decent job even if the characters are on the clichéd side. What really holds it all together though is the choreography of the action scenes, which for a movie this size are nothing short of excellent... In terms of the plot it isn't something that is particularly mindblowing in its originality, it's in the execution though that makes it work.

Richard Sopko, reviewing the anthology release, took the opposite view, saying the film's production values are "subpar" when compared to the look of the other shorts, "but the story is interesting." Carl Fisher considered it the "silliest" of the anthology, "with some cheesy acting, cringe-worthy dialogue & very odd fight scenes."

=== Accolades ===
- Trieste Science+Fiction Festival, Best Short Film (2008)
- Silver Méliès (Méliès d'Argent) (Short Film), Fanomenon (2009, presented at the Trieste Science+Fiction Festival)
