= Pressure Bolt =

- Film poster
- Druckbolzen
- Directed by: Benni Diez
- Written by: Benni Diez
- Produced by: Marinko Spahić
- Starring: Benjamin Biehn; Erfan Al-Madani; Claudius Urban
- Cinematography: Benni Diez
- Edited by: Benni Diez
- Music by: Erfan Al-Madani
- Animation by: Benni Diez
- Production company: Filmakademie Baden-Württemberg
- Release date: 1 May 2003 (Sehsuechte)
- Running time: 9 minutes
- Country: Germany
- Language: German
- Budget: €250

Pressure Bolt (German: Druckbolzen) is a 2003 German short live-action animated film created by Benni Diez and Marinko Spahić. Shot in black and white, the film has been described as a dystopian vision of the future, in which what remains of the human race is worked to death in a set of repetitive and meaningless tasks. The short film garnered praise and awards, mainly for its technical innovation. The short has been compared to the work of Marc Caro, Jean-Pierre Jeunet, Alex Proyas, Terry Gilliam, and David Lynch.

== Plot ==
A newcomer, one of many men in drab suits walking in single file through a wasteland, enters a huge and grim factory building and is interviewed by a "headhunter" who only appears to be a man, but is actually a "talking face". The newcomer agrees to take the job. He makes his way to a room where other men sit in cubicles processing forms which appear on desks through a slot. The newcomer imitates what they do, slotting the finished forms back through a second slot.

On the other side of the room, a frightened man has fallen behind in his paperwork. Punishment for this "quitter" is swift and deadly. The newcomer returns to his desk and redoubles his efforts, lest he, too, meet the same fate. His struggles with the system appear to be in vain.

== Cast ==
- Benjamin Biehn as Newcomer
- Erfan Al-Madani as Headhunter (Headhunter's Voice: Tobias Seiffert)
- Claudius Urban as Quitter

Benni Diez is among the six extras playing other potential new employees.

== Themes ==
=== Bureaucracy and alienation ===
Pressure Bolt invokes a vision of a future dystopia, in which lines of alienated people on screen appear to be all that remains of the human race, worked to death in a set of repetitive and meaningless tasks. Human beings work both for and inside of "an enormous bureaucratic machinery", each one "an insignificant cog" in a "merciless system in which abnegators are eliminated", and indeed whose whole purpose "seems to be self destruction."

== Production ==
=== Background and development ===
Benni Diez developed a love for horror and science-fiction filmmaking in the early 1990s, and worked for agencies and production companies in Bavaria before enrolling at Film Academy Baden-Württemberg in 2002, where he specialised in visual effects and animation. Pressure Bolt was made during his first year at the film academy, and is the first film on which Diez collaborated with Marinko Spahić, another student at Baden-Württemberg (they collaborated again on Kingz, released in 2007).

Benni Diez performed most of the principal tasks himself, including visual effects and served as an extra. The film was made for €250.

Erfan Al-Madani, who plays the headhunter, translated all of his script from German to Arabic, as "it was easier for him to act in his native language."

=== Filming ===
The short is a 35 mm film (Digital Betacam), all of it shot within a 3x3 m blue screen over two days, using two lamps, "a shopping cart for a dolly," on a Canon XM1 DV camera. According to Diez: "Pretty much everything except the actor is CG. I spent about 2 months in front of my monitor," using After Effects and 3ds Max. All the textures were hand painted with watercolours.

=== Music ===
Erfan Al-Madani plays the accordion heard on the music soundtrack.

== Release ==
Pressure Bolt was shown for the first time at Sehsuechte, the Potsdam student film festival, on 1 May 2003. Thereafter the short was screened at a number of international film festivals in Europe, including Karlovy Vary (in competition in the independents forum, July 2003), Lund, Sarajevo, Munich, Festival garage (Stralsund, August 2003), Clermont, and Leuven. It was also shown at the 10th Festival on Wheels in Ankara. The short won awards when shown at Aubagne, for sound, and at Bradford, for technical innovation.

=== Home media and streaming ===
Pressure Bolt appears with twelve other short films in the German 13th Street production Shocking Shorts 2 anthology film DVD (2004) including directors' commentary.

The short appears in its entirety on Vimeo.

== Reception ==
=== Critical response ===
Ain't It Cool News called Pressure Bolt "stunning" and "quite possibly the best film ever made for under five hundred bucks". Todd Brown similarly praises the short, particularly for its technical achievements despite the tiny budget:

Druckbolzen proves conclusively that while money can go a long way to mask a lack of talent the truly talented can create entire worlds for nothing. Diez and Spahić are, to put it simply, hugely talented, and with their paltry budget put together a film that would do Alex Proyas, Terry Gilliam or David Lynch proud.

Assigning a rating of 3½ stars, Austin Wolfe Murray calls Pressure Bolt Kafkaesque "in tone and spirit," a film in which fear is "the driving force." He compares the short to Marc Caro's and Jean-Pierre Jeunet's The City of Lost Children, moments when the room, the headhunter and the "quitter" might have been mistaken for CGI animations, "created to look not quite normal and, therefore, disturbing."

=== Accolades ===
Awards

- Festival International du Film d'Aubagne (2003) • Best Sound (€3500, split evenly between composer and director)
- National Museum of Photography, Film & Television (Bradford Film Festival, 2004) • Shine Award for Best International Short Film
- Dervio Film Festival (Dervio, 2004) • Best Director

Nomination

- 13th Street (Munich Film Festival, 2003) • Shocking Shorts Award
