= Film University =

Film university may refer to:

- Film school, an educational institution dedicated to film-making
- Film studies, an academic discipline concerned with the study of films
- Konrad Wolf Film University of Babelsberg in Germany
