= Darth Maul: Apprentice =

- YouTube thumbnail of the film
- Directed by: Shawn Bu
- Written by: Shawn Bu
- Based on: Darth Maul by George Lucas
- Produced by: Shawn Bu; Vi-Dan Tran (executive); Eyyüphan Duy (executive); Jannik Siebert (executive); Julien Bam (executive)
- Starring: Ben Schamma; Mathis Landwehr; Svenja Jung; Eskindir Tesfay; Maja Felicitas Bergmann; Paul Cless; Sefa Demirbas; Dirk Chwialkowsky; Lee Hua
- Cinematography: Max Tsui; Vadim Schulz; Vi-Dan Tran
- Edited by: Shawn Bu
- Music by: Vincent Lee
- Production company: T7 Production
- Release date: March 5, 2016 (YouTube)
- Running time: 18 minutes
- Country: Germany
- Language: English
- Budget: $25,000

Darth Maul: Apprentice is a 2016 English-language German short science fiction fan film written and directed by Shawn Bu, and produced by T7 Production. The film focuses around Darth Maul, a villain of the Star Wars franchise, in particular Star Wars: Episode I – The Phantom Menace, of which this fan film is set before. As of January 2022, it has amassed over 30 million views.

== Plot ==
On an unknown planet, Darth Maul trains his own abilities and studies his opponents to complete his Sith training under Darth Sidious. During his training, a drone stationed in orbit around the planet reports an approaching spaceship. To remain hidden and complete his training in secret, Maul sets out to kill the intruders before they discover his hiding place and report it. It is revealed that the group consists of six Jedi. Maul swiftly kills a Jedi scout, which gains the other five Jedi's attention, and they fight him. Despite being outnumbered, Maul successfully kills the other Jedi, except for a Jedi Master and his Padawan. They manage to get the upper hand however, and Maul appears to retreat. The Jedi follow him through a canyon, but run into a trap set up by Maul. He overpowers the Padawan and kills the Jedi Master. Right when Maul is about to kill the Padawan, one of the presumed dead Jedi intervenes, and this gives enough time for the Padawan to run. Maul catches up with the Padawan in the middle of a clearing however, and they continue to duel. Maul fights her to the ground, and is hesitant on killing her, but he notices his master's camera drone around him, and kills the Padawan. Sidious appears as a hologram to Maul to express how he is pleased with Maul's achievement and declares his training complete. This is when Sidious also explains that he led the Jedi to the planet where Maul was training so he could kill them, and that it would mark "the beginning of the end for all Jedi."

== Cast ==
- Ben Schamma as Darth Maul
- Mathis Landwehr as Jedi Master
- Svenja Jung as Jedi Apprentice
- Eskindir Tesfay as Jedi Berserker
- Maja Felicitas Bergmann as Togruta Jedi
- Paul Cless as Jedi Scout
- Sefa Demirbas as Acrobatic Jedi Knight
- Dirk Chwialkowsky as Darth Sidious
  - Lee Hua as voice of Darth Sidious

== Production ==
=== Filming ===
The filming took eighteen days in total from September 14, 2014 to November 11, 2015. Filming took place in Bollendorf, Eifel, Germany for ten days, Teufelsschlucht, Eifel, Germany for three days in March and June 2015, Brunssummerheide, Netherlands for three days in October 2015, and at a studio in Aachen, Germany for two days in December 2014 and November 2015.

== Reception ==
Darth Maul: Apprentice has received positive reviews from critics and audiences.

Andrew Liptak of io9 praised the lightsaber battles, cinematography, and setting. Blake Rodgers of Nerdist not only praised the lightsaber battles and cinematography, but the story as well. Rick Marshall of Digital Trends praised Ben Schamma's portrayal of Maul and the makeup, but was disappointed with the runtime of the film. Ryan Downey of AltPress said, "it’s a taut, intimate, action-packed standalone story," and praised the special effects, costumes, and the fighting choreography. Ethan Anderton of SlashFilm said the lightsaber special effects were, "...pretty well done...," and gave the fighting choreography high praise, along with the cinematography. Jeff Spry of Syfy Wire ranked the film number two on his top fourteen best Star Wars fan films list. He described the production as spectacular, and praised the lightsaber battles, choreography, and setting. Jeremy Fuster of TheWrap ranked the film number nine on his top eleven best Star Wars fan films list, and said, "...[it] features the best lightsaber fight you'll see in any fan film."
