= Stung (2015 film) =

2015 film by Benni Diez

- Theatrical release poster
- Directed by: Benni Diez
- Written by: Adam Aresty
- Produced by: Christian Becker; Benjamin Munz
- Starring: Matt O'Leary; Jessica Cook; Lance Henriksen; Clifton Collins Jr.; Cecilia Pillado; Eve Slatner
- Cinematography: Stephan Burchardt
- Edited by: Dominik Kattwinkel
- Music by: Antonio Gambale; David Menke
- Production companies: Rat Pack Filmproduktion; XYZ Films; Berghauswobke Film
- Distributed by: Splendid Film (Germany); IFC Midnight (United States)
- Release dates: April 17, 2015 (Tribeca Film Festival); July 3, 2015 (United States); October 29, 2015 (Germany)
- Running time: 87 minutes
- Countries: Germany; United States
- Language: English

Stung (German: Stung – Sie werden dich stechen!) is a 2015 science fiction comedy horror film directed by Benni Diez, written by Adam Aresty, and starring Matt O'Leary, Jessica Cook, Lance Henriksen, Clifton Collins Jr., Cecilia Pillado and Eve Slatner. In the film, a fancy garden party is thrown into chaos when killer wasps mutate into 7 ft (2.1 m)-tall predators and go on a grisly rampage.

== Plot ==
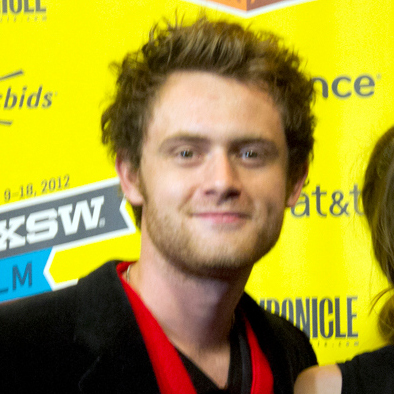
O'Leary in 2013

Julia, who runs a catering company, and her employee Paul (Matt O'Leary), prepare to set up for a function at the Perch estate. The rural world of Mrs. Perch, a well-to-do elderly lady in New York, anticipate of her annual garden party, a small but elaborate affair held in a villa at the remote estate where she resides with her son Sydney. Among the guests is the town mayor, Caruthers.

Due to an illegally imported plant fertilizer mixed with growth hormones which seeped into the ground, a local species of parasitic wasp mutated into significantly larger creatures. Mrs. Perch's upper-class celebrants, slowed by the evening's festivities, were attacked by the wasps. After burrowing inside their victim's bodies, the wasps emerge as creatures seven feet (2.1 m) long.

Paul and Julia realize that the wasps reproduce through their stingers, also ovipositors, as juvenile wasps emerge from human hosts who are killed in the process.

Paul, Julia, Mayor Caruthers, Sydney, Mrs. Perch, and Flora (the cook) take refuge inside the house, barricading it from the fierce attack. Following a car crash outside, the phone lines are dead, leaving the survivors cut off from the outside world. They hide in the basement, but Mrs. Perch, who has already been stung, is killed when a wasp bursts from her body. They flee into the hallway and close the door, but the wasp's stinger penetrates the door, killing Flora.

Paul, Julia, Mayor Caruthers, and Sydney escape to the wine cellar. They consider escaping in the catering van, but Paul has left his keys outside. He manages to retrieve the keys and kill a wasp. Sydney, however, has been stung, and is controlled by the emergent wasp until Paul and Julia subdue him.

Paul, Julia, and Mayor Caruthers begin to sneak around and find an exit. The three suddenly under attack, Mayor Caruthers sacrifices himself, allowing Paul and Julia to escape into another room. They kill an invading wasp and get outside, but Paul is taken by a wasp and flown to a nest. There he recognizes the queen emerging from Mrs. Perch still controls Sydney, who attempts to force a wasp larva into Paul's mouth to incubate and grow. Julia appears and cuts Sydney in half with an electric saw, rescues Paul, and blows up the nest. As they drive away, a surviving wasp, its body on fire, attacks the car. Paul rams the car into a tree and kills the wasp, but the crash knocks him and Julia out.

Paul wakes up and tries to wake Julia. Finally, she wakes up to the arrival of the authorities. They are placed in the back of an ambulance where they kiss and start to have sex. An officer wanting to question them closed the ambulance doors to allow them privacy. An officer approaches the front of the van where the queen wasp is pinned against the tree and just as he asks another officer "What do you think of this?", a cow's head falls from the sky crushing him to death. The officers and paramedics look up into the sky, the ambulance doors open allowing Julia and Paul to see wasp-cow hybrids flying overhead with a cow bell ringing. The camera cuts to black leaving the fate of humanity unknown.

== Cast ==
- Matt O'Leary as Paul
- Jessica Cook as Julia
- Lance Henriksen as Mayor Caruthers
- Clifton Collins Jr. as Sydney
- Cecilia Pillado as Flora
- Eve Slatner as Mrs. Perch
- Daniele Rizzo as Larry
- Florentine Lahme as Gweneth
- Kathleen Renish as Mrs. Markham
- Tony De Maeyer as Doc Withney
- David Masterson as Mr. Markham
- Benedikt Bothe as Gardener 1
- Tommy Kreiselmaier as Gardener 2
- Benni Diez as Firefighter

== Themes, influences, and genres ==
When asked what Stung was "really about", director Benni Diez answered: "Capitalism! Well, not really. But it's the hard working underdogs who have to save the day, as the upper class crowd virtually turns into flesh eating über-wasps. A survival thriller with a warm heart."

Asked if he was influenced by German genre filmmakers, Diez said he was not, preferring instead classic American horror films such as Jaws and Aliens, going so far as to say the "whole film is an homage to films like that". Robinson pointed out that the film has the atmosphere of 1950s creature features, "and the humor is very much up to the moment in terms of camp." Agreeing, Diez referenced Them! (1954), a giant-ant movie, "and other really old black-and-white movies" where the filmmakers did not care about photo-realism, but rather asked, "What's the psychology behind a menacing monster attack? What are the middle layers between? What does this do to people?" Those old American monster movies were what drew Diez to Adam Arresty's script to begin with: "it's a kind of genre where I thought there are way too few movies of that kind that are—you know, that are old-school creature movies that leave you with a fun feeling when you get out of the theater." According to Diez, the questions he and his colleagues as modern independent filmmakers were asking was:

"How can we try to put an indie-movie sensibility into this classic monster drama, and create characters that you believe, because they're very down to earth?" Stung isn't really mumblecore, but it's borderline sometimes. We put those kind of characters into monster situations and then just see what happens. And hopefully, people get emotionally involved because of it.

Reviewers such as Andy Webster and Dennis Harvey, who notes that the film's giant wasps are in fact attacking WASPs, recognize that Stung is also a "horror-comedy". Diez cites comedic and satirical horror films such as Tremors, Gremlins, and Slither as additional influences: "we didn't want to play it too seriously because when you ask the audience to buy into human-sized wasps attacking people, you have to wink once in a while and make a little bit of fun of it."

Tasha Robinson remarks that while Stung is "a silly horror film about giant mutant killer wasps", it is also, at times, "a surprisingly sincere romance." In her interview with Diez, he acknowledged that an early "elevator pitch" for the film was "Garden State vs. Aliens": "We just wanted to have those two genres clash, to see what happens. And it's what we did. Besides, we had to spend a little time without effects just to afford 90 minutes of film on our budget."

== Production ==
=== Background, writing, and financing ===
The script for Stung was Adam Aresty's winning submission to a screenwriting contest launched by the German production company Rat Pack in cooperation with Fantasy Filmfest. The story was inspired by a period when his life was shut down by a wasp attack. In the Robinson interview, Benni Diez said his manager sent him Arresty's script and he loved it. In another interview, Diez said the script "called to me on a few very profound levels, mainly to my inner child that watched Alien way too young and got messed up in the brain by it a little bit." Diez called Arresty and found they had the same tastes in movies and sense of humor:

I knew if I was ever going to do a feature film, this was going to be my first, because it's just perfect. It has every element I love about drama. It has the scope where I would dare start really directing actors. Because it's not an ensemble with a dozen characters that have a lot of nuance, it's very compact.

The project took about three and a half years to complete. Diez was excited to work on it, and "luckily enough" a friend worked at a production company. In 2012, Diez shot a 90-second teaser trailer for Stung "for a couple of bucks" to convince people he could create giant wasps of "sufficient quality", which lead to the feature being financed as a German-American co-production. In this respect, his background in visual effects (he has a diploma in visual effects and animation from the Baden-Württemberg Film Academy) "helped a lot with financing".

The film was financed through pre-sales around a year before the shoot... At that point crowd funding was discussed, but quickly abandoned, I guess because it would have been more work to handle the campaign than it would have helped the production. Also it sends a weird message to audiences if you already have a significant chunk of money and then go out and ask them for more. In my opinion at least.

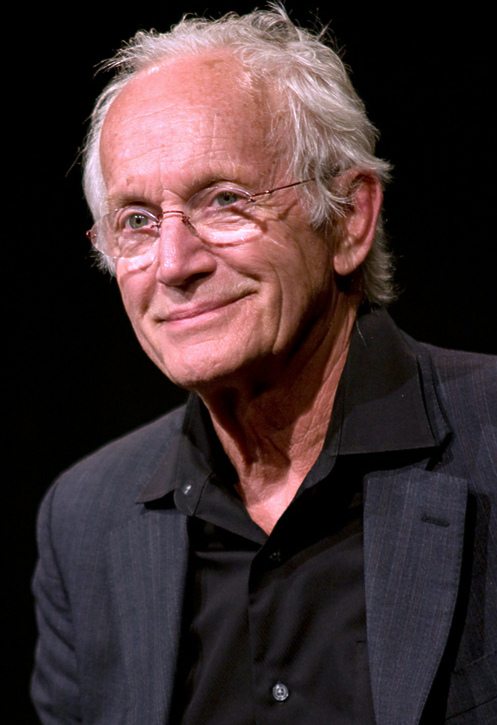
Benni Diez called Lance Henriksen a "great and generous actor".

=== Casting and characterization ===
With no casting director, casting for the low-budget genre film took a long time; "name" actors are careful about "which corner they want to put themselves in later on" when it comes to a film about seven-foot wasps. Diez and Aresty approached a few actors for the role of Mayor Caruthers. One day, Diez said to the producers, "Guys, just for the fun of it, can we ask Lance Henriksen? He's not going to do it, but let's just ask him."

And then I was out with a few friends in Cologne... having a few beers, and my phone rang, and my producing partner [Benjamin Munz] said, "Hey Benni, it's Ben, Lance is doing the movie." And I was like, "What?!" Imagine being out with your friends at night and getting this kind of phone call.

Asked why he took the role, Henriksen said: "I love humor" and relished the chance to play a burnt out "loser" politician: "I have had a lifetime of listening to politicians, and all of their b.s. and all their manipulations and everything else, with the pretense".

Both Henriksen's character and Sydney, played by Clifton Collins Jr., evolved from the actors. When Diez first spoke with him over the phone, Henriksen had "really smart ideas" about his character, how to make it more realistic and funny: "A lot of the humor that's in the scenes with him comes from his ideas ... I think this aspect of him has been underused a lot in most of his movies." In developing the character of Caruthers, Henriksen thought of Toronto mayor Rob Ford, reputed to have openly smoked crack cocaine or other drugs: "He's having a nervous breakdown, that's what he's doing. Anyway, when we started working on it, I thought, 'I'm just gonna really be present and see where this takes me.'"

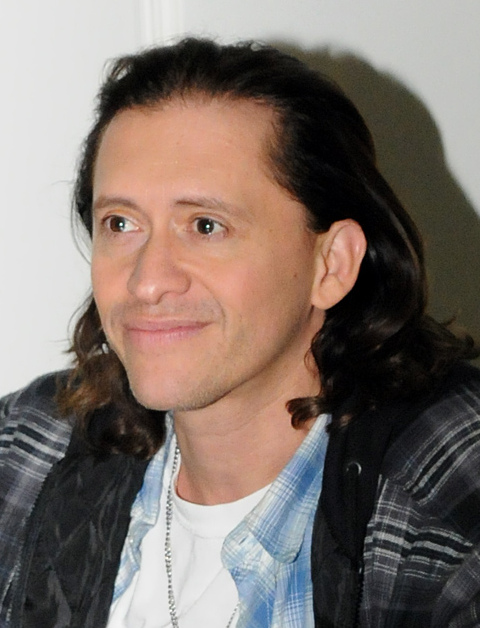
Clifton Collins Jr.

Sydney was originally cast with someone else, and then Collins joined "shortly before the production."

That informed his role a lot. It was really awesome to get him in there, because before that, the role was a bit more basic, really just the weird guy who's kind of a villain. He's such a character actor, and he has such a nice, natural phrasing. He did so much with the role. And having Adam on the set to work on the script, we always had the opportunity to tweak dialogue, to tweak little details in the scenes. I talked a lot with Cliff even on the day before the shoot. Five minutes before the shoot, he blasted me with questions about the character, and we fleshed out even more details. It was really an awesome experience for me as an inexperienced director working with such high-grade character actors.

For Diez, as this was his first feature film, it was a "real challenge" working with experienced actors and creating believable characters with them, even on such a "fairly small scale" such as in a low budget film, but it turned out to be "a mind blowing experience".

=== Filming and visual effects ===
I know for actors oftentimes they are frustrated about playing against tennis balls. For me, as a director, as well, it's way more interesting and fun to have puppets on the set; it means you can actually direct physically—like an actor, basically. There's much more humanity and life behind it... It's much more natural when you have things on set. And... it's way more fun... they're covered in slime and artificial blood.

— Benni Diez

Stung was shot on two Arri Alexa cameras with Hawke anamorphic lenses, Diez and his cinematographer Stephan Burchardt insisting on quality lenses with a view to achieving "a nice cinematic and timeless look." Some greenscreen scenes were shot on Red. Principal photography took place in Brandenberg over 24 days, mid-October to mid-November 2013, with very short shooting days and no overtime due to contractual obligations.

==== Computer graphics ====
Benni Diez has an established background in visual effects. He could not say what percentage of the effects in Stung were practical versus CG as sometimes both were "combined in one shot", though they tried to do as little CG as possible but "ended up with more CG than planned" due to the short amount of time available for principal photography. Broadly speaking, the bodies of the wasps and close-ups are real, while the wings and more distant shots are CG, "because you can't wire-control the bodies any more, because then you would see the puppeteer."

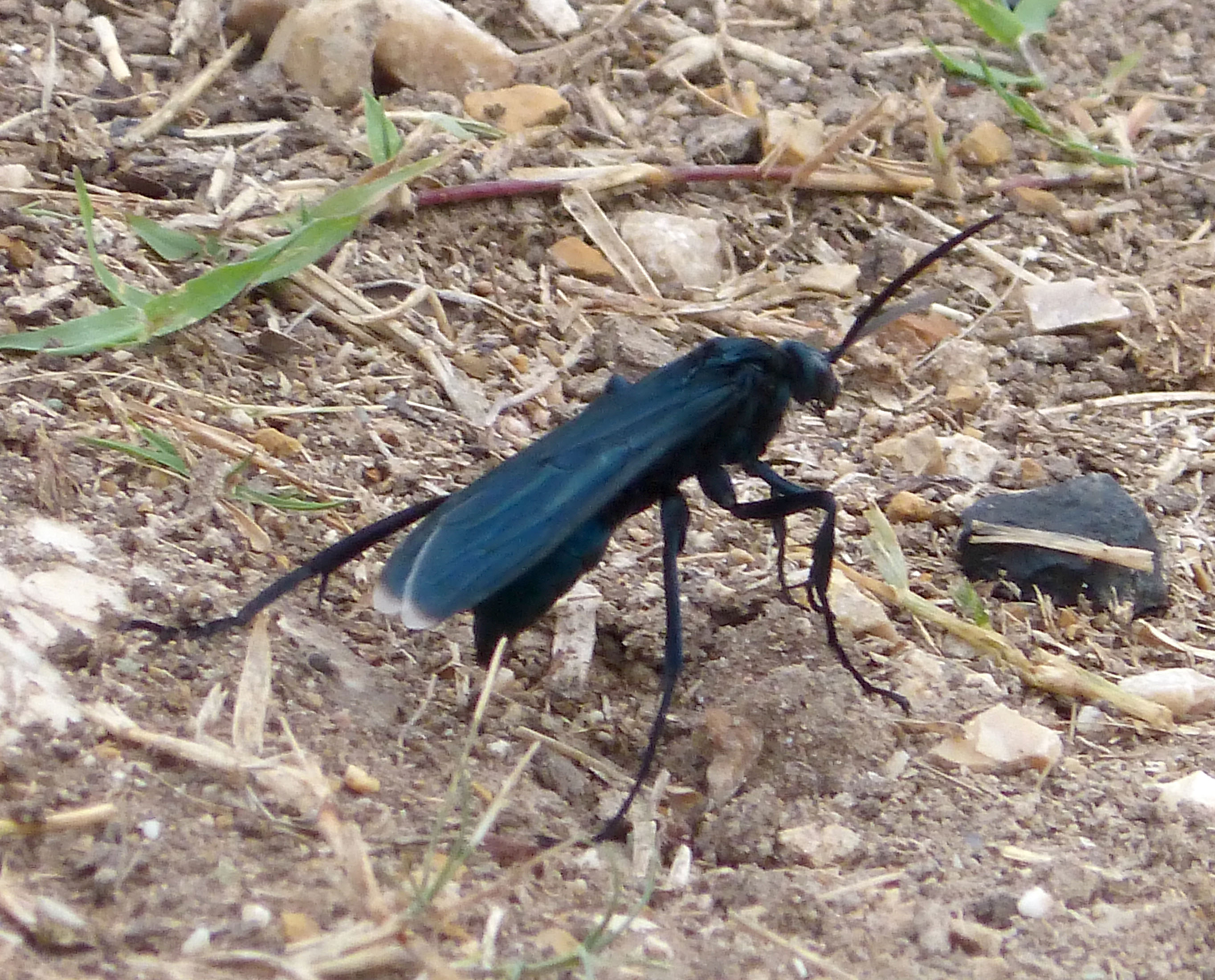
Benni Diez said the tarantula wasp "almost looks like a war machine."

===== Creature design =====
Diez had the effects team base the giant wasps on a real wasp species, the tarantula wasp, "because it was very lean and had very strong legs and wings, black, mostly—it already looks like an alien, kind of." The wasp lays its eggs in tarantulas which serve as hosts. "Pretty much like it was in Alien, which probably took a lot of inspiration from nature as well." Expanding on this with a view to surprising the audience, they asked themselves what more could be done:

Can you do just more wasps, bigger wasps—or can you do some crazy stuff? ... Okay, one guy has a lump on his shoulder, and into that lump eggs will grow to full effect, and it would be kind of weird, and maybe he would still be alive when it hatches. We started thinking in those directions to go a bit more crazy and a bit more... we tried having sick ideas. I mean, it gets even sicker towards the end.

They expanded on the initial design to give the wasps more "character and expression to give them some emotional quality."

=== Editing and postproduction ===
According to Diez, the original shoot had a lot more romantic elements in it: "One of the earlier cuts had an even longer first act. And we knew, 'Okay, that’s too much. People want to see the wasps in action.'"

Postproduction took place in Cologne, and the final film mix at ARRI Studios in Munich.

=== Music ===
Stung's score composers, Antonio Gambale and David Menke, are based in Paris. Diez spent some time with them discussing the film's narrative style and aesthetics, and the composers developed test themes and musical approaches. Diez wanted "a score that can turn on a dime, changing direction and intention at 180 degrees in a heartbeat" and for the score to be "hyper-aware of character perspective". As their ideas started to align, it became clear that "the best way to score this film was going to be via close-knit, hands-on work with as few barriers between us and the director as possible", which meant the composers had to make a few road trips.

In order to work with Diez during postproduction, Gambale and Menke drove from Paris to Cologne, where Menke's parents had a garden house which was used as a makeshift recording studio. From there, with "85–90% of the cues locked down", they drove to Sound Mill Studios in Vienna, stopping in Nuremberg for a day and recording some strings in the home of Menke's grandparents. In Vienna, they began their 5.1 music mixes, as well as additional composing and recording. Diez, having been "dragged along" to Vienna, was made to play as well: "He turned out to have a real talent with the drum sticks, and we came up with one of our favourite percussion-based cues in the film using his tom tom bashing."

== Release ==
The film's world premiere was at the Tribeca Film Festival on April 17, 2015, where it was, according to Tasha Robinson, the "standout" among the "midnight-madness horror movies".

=== Distribution ===
Stung had already been picked up by IFC Midnight by the time it screened at Tribeca. The film's general release took place on July 3, 2015.

=== Soundtrack ===
An official soundtrack for Stung was released by Westpack Musikverlag, and is available on Amazon, iTunes, and Spotify, as well as on a CD. Tracks may also be heard on Antonio Gambale's website.

No.	Title	Length
1.	"Opening"	3:25
2.	"Wasp Attack"	3:18
3.	"Better Even"	1:00
4.	"Mrs Perch"	1:25
5.	"Paul by Himself"	0:43
6.	"What Year is This?"	2:56
7.	"Paul's Story"	2:04
8.	"Smashing Cabinet"	0:46
9.	"I'll Go"	2:33
10.	"Paul Stung"	2:00
11.	"Julia Garden Blackout"	2:13
12.	"The Nest"	3:38
13.	"Separating the Twins"	1:30
14.	"Go go go!"	1:31
15.	"Queen Attack"	2:09
16.	"Kissing"	2:22
17.	"Mad Cows"	0:23
18.	"Hot House Flower"	2:09

== Reception ==
=== Critical response ===
Stung has a score of 46 out of 100 on Metacritic based on nine critics' reviews, indicating "mixed or average reviews". The film also has a score of 56% on Rotten Tomatoes.

Heather Wixson of the Daily Dead rated Stung 3.5/5, praising the "incredible special effects, tons of wickedly fun kills, as well as a strong script from Adam Aresty that does an excellent job balancing out the humor and horror." Writing for The New York Times, Andy Webster praised the monsters as skillful blends of "viscous textures with cheesy digital flourishes." Andy Crump agreed, calling it a "creature feature calibrated to satisfy much simpler, old-fashioned pleasures", and gave the film a score of 2.5/4, as did Dustin Putman (TheFrightFile.com) and Slant Magazine's Chuck Bowen, who said: "The filmmakers maintain a tone that's mostly ideal for the contemporary equivalent of a drive-in movie: of reverent, parodic irreverence."

Reviewing Stung for FrightFest 2015, Joey Keogh of Wicked Horror gave a score of 6.5/10. Maitland McDonagh, writing for Film Journal International, appreciated that the film "relied less on CGI and more on practical effects", calling the film a "formulaic but good-natured throwback to big-bug movies past that should entertain genre fans". Similarly, Michael Nordine of the Village Voice found it important that the film believes in what it is doing and said that it "delights in its own stupidity the way a dog rolls in dirt, but is nearly as difficult to get mad at after it muddies up the rug."

Martin Tsai, writing for the Los Angeles Times found the special effects "solid" but the human relationships less credible. As well, he thought the Alien references were lost in the execution, along with the script's Hitchcock influences, which "come off as more accidental than deliberate." Conversely, The A.V. Club's Jesse Hassenger compares the film's couple to the one in Party Down:

O'Leary and Cook are no Scott and Caplan, neither as sardonic nor as empathetic. But they do share a likable, unforced chemistry—they both convey weariness with their jobs without condescending to them, or each other—that gives Stung a strong rooting interest. Their flirtation feels sweetly mutual, and once they're facing an unexpected danger, it turns into an alliance based more or less in equality—even if Paul whines that Julia "still treats me like an employee" 10 minutes into a crisis that begins while he is, in fact, employed by her.

Assigning the film a C, Hassenger faulted the "final stretch", in which "nearly every scene feels drawn out to twice its natural length-and not as an exercise in unbearable tension." Anton Bitel, writing for Projected Figures, agreed that the leads have charisma but found the script "perfunctory" and criticized the "low-grade CGI". Dennis Harvey, writing for Variety, felt that "despite game contributions from all involved, nothing else in Stung goes quite far enough."

Simon Abrams of RogerEbert.com gave the film 1 star out of 4, calling it "the worst kind of neo-exploitation film: the kind that encourages you to root for a good guy who is essentially a man-child until crisis mode kicks in, and he abruptly becomes Badass Grownupman." Trance Thurman, writing for Bloody Disgusting, assigned Stung 1.5/5 and said it took itself "far too seriously", and Joe Neumaier of the New York Daily News said that the film was missing "the fun", rating it 1 out of 5.

=== Accolade ===
- Fantaspoa International Fantastic Film Festival (Porto Alegre, Brazil) 2015 • Best Feature
