= Konrad Wolf Film University of Babelsberg =

Film school in Potsdam, Germany

- Filmuniversität Babelsberg KONRAD WOLF
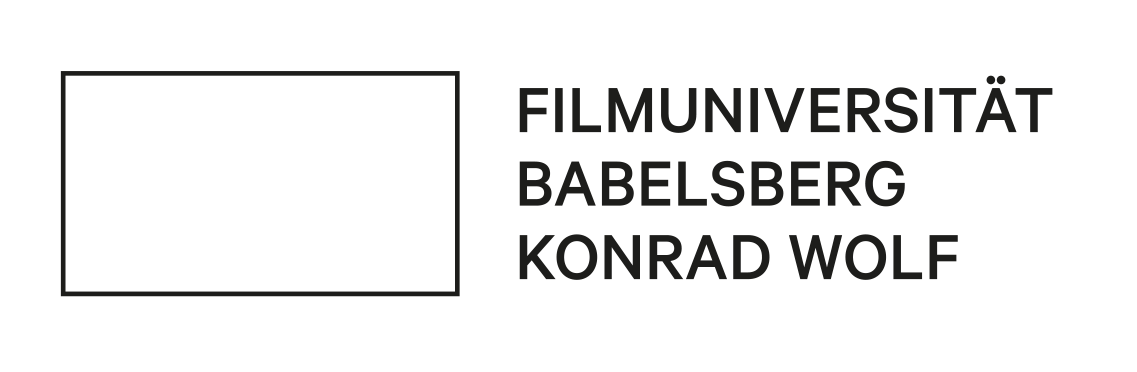
- Type: Public
- Established: 1954
- President: Susanne Stürmer
- Rector: Susanne Stürmer
- Students: 660
- Location: Potsdam, Brandenburg, Germany
- Website: filmuniversitaet.de/en

The Konrad Wolf Film University of Babelsberg (German: Filmuniversität Babelsberg Konrad Wolf) is the oldest and largest film school in Germany. The university offers undergraduate, graduate, as well as post-graduate studies in all fields of the process of filmmaking. In addition, it is the only art school in Brandenburg, situated together with the Babelsberg Film Studio in Babelsberg.

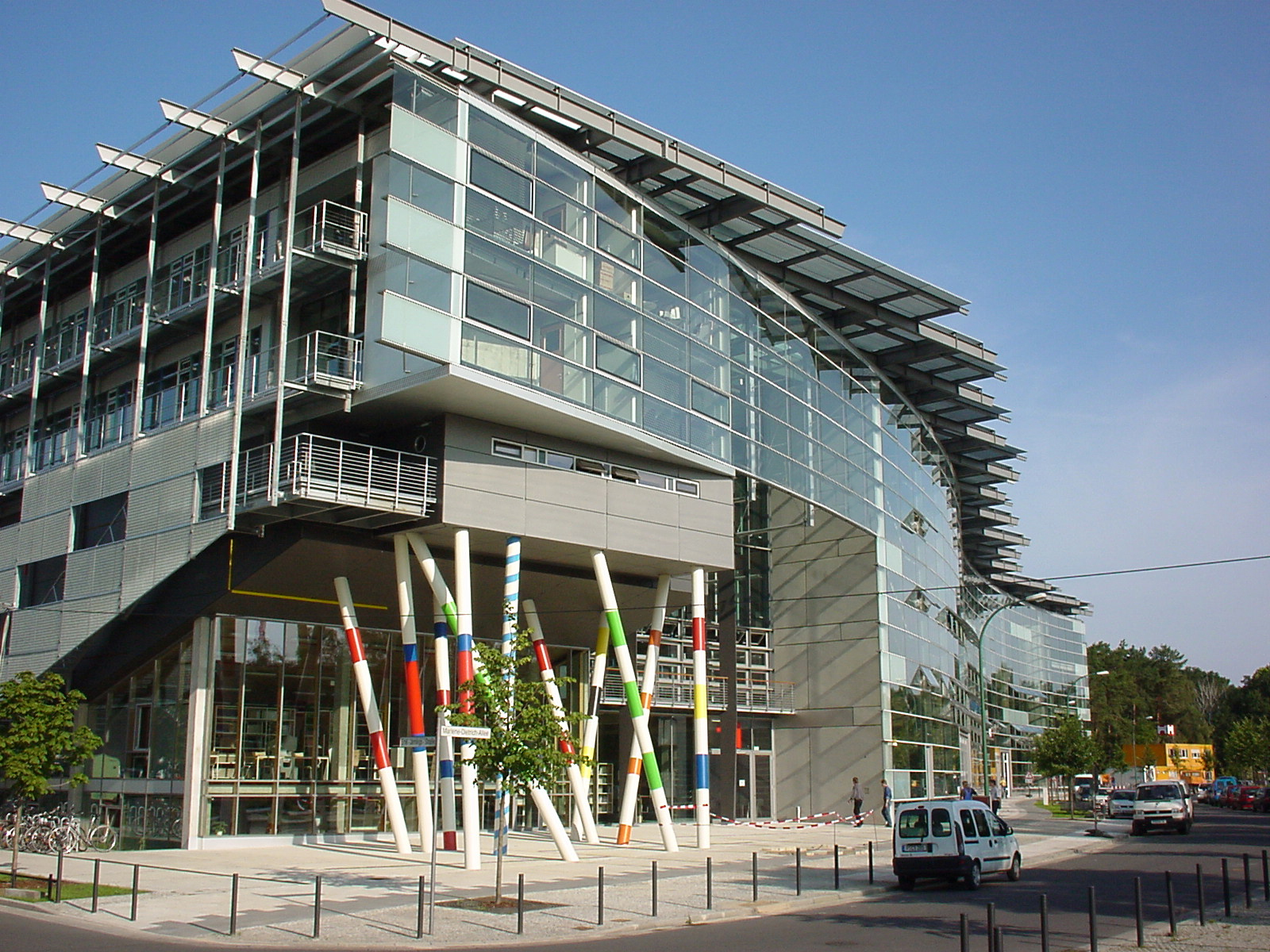
Konrad Wolf Film University main building

Various departments expand research, teaching, and studies, as well as the improvement of national and international affiliations. Among them are the Institute for Artistic Research (Institut für künstlerische Forschung) and the Potsdam Film Museum (Filmmusem Potsdam). With the same objective, the university is also affiliated with the Erich Pommer Institute and the Institute for Career Research and Business Planning in Media (Institut für Berufsforschung und Unternehmensplanung Medien).

== History ==
The institution was founded on 1 November 1954 as a German Academy of Film Art (German: Deutsche Hochschule für Filmkunst) at Babelsberg Palace in Potsdam-Babelsberg, and in 1969, it was renamed the Film and Television Academy of the GDR. In 1985, it was named after director Konrad Wolf; the institute was renamed in 1990 to Academy for Film and Television.

On 8 July 2014, the school was granted university status and renamed Konrad Wolf Film University of Babelsberg, after 60 years of existence.

Historically, the head of the university was given the title of rector, but in May 2000, this post was renamed president. The first rector of the university was Kurt Maetzig, from 1954 to 1964. He was replaced by Konrad Schwalbe, who headed the film school until 1969. Lutz Köhlert (1969–1973), Peter Ulbrich (1973–1980), Konrad Schwalbe (1980–1986), and Lothar Bisky (1986–1990) were successors until the reunification of Germany. From 1990 until 1995, the rector was Wolf-Dieter Panse. His successor and first president, from 2000 until 2013, was Dieter Wiedemann. Since 2013, the first woman to lead the university has been economist Susanne Stürmer.

== Studies ==
The university offers courses related to film, within Bachelor of Arts and Master of Arts programs. The courses of 2015/16 were animation, animation directing, audio-visual application design, cinematography, digital media culture, script/dramaturgy, film and television production, film culture heritage, film music, film and television directing, media science, editing, directing, drama, sound, sound for picture, scenography/production design, and scenography.

The Media Studies program is the most research-oriented course at the university and includes basic academic research and application-oriented research that reflects the artistic practice. Every year, students of the program collaborate with Sehsuechte, the largest student film festival in Europe, which takes place in April on the university campus and at Thalia Cinema at the Potsdam-Babelsberg station.

== Known films ==
Over the years, many movies have been filmed at the university, including Netto, And Along Come Tourists, Move, Combat Girls, Little Thirteen, Breaking Horizons, and Rakete Perelman.

== Award ==
In 2011, the Academy of Film and Television sponsored an award for special artistic and scientific achievements. Jürgen Böttcher was the first graduate of the university to win an award "for outstanding international successes in film and painting, for artistic freedom and political responsibility".
