= Das Rad =

2001 short film directed by Chris Stenner

- Directed by: Chris Stenner; Arvid Uibel; Heidi Wittlinger
- Written by: Chris Stenner; Arvid Uibel; Heidi Wittlinger
- Production company: Film Academy Baden-Württemberg
- Release date: 2001
- Running time: 8 minutes
- Country: Germany
- Language: German

Das Rad (English title: Rocks) meaning "The Wheel" is a 2001 German animated short film written and directed by Chris Stenner, Arvid Uibel and Heidi Wittlinger. Produced using a mixture of stop-motion, puppetry, and CGI animation, it was nominated for an Oscar in "Best Animated Short Film", but lost to The ChubbChubbs!

The film tracks a hillside from ancient times through the present and into the future, for the most part moving through time at high-speed, representing geologic time (so that buildings appear and disappear in an instant), but occasionally switching to real time and showing the inhabitants and objects in motion in their day-to-day existence.

It was produced by the Film Academy Baden-Württemberg, Germany.

== Plot ==
Two stone people, Hew and Kew, lead a quiet life, which is only interrupted by Hew being covered by swiftly-growing moss and lichen. After seeing a primitive village appear in a neighboring valley, the smaller Kew finds a round stone disc that he keeps playing with by rolling side to side. The centuries fly by. In the distance, both stone creatures observe people building huts. Later, a caveman appears in front of Kew and sees the stone disc, but is called away by another caveman. The humans move so quickly that the stone people are unable to see them.

More centuries pass. A dirt road emerges in front of Hew and Kew, where a traveling trader breaks the wooden wheel of his wagon, which he replaces with another wooden wheel, leaving behind the old one. Kew realizes that the wheel is the key to all development. As time accelerates again, the road next to both stone beings is rapidly paved in flashing lights. Huge skyscrapers and monstrous cities appear in rapid succession across the landscape, rising into a futuristic cityscape. The building development, rushing closer like a giant tsunami wave, suddenly stops at the exact second before both stone creatures would have been paved over. Everything abruptly halts, indicating civilization has ended. The skyscrapers erode and disappear as quickly as they were created, and the landscape regrows with vegetation. Hew is now plagued by lichens and mosses again.

== Cast ==
- Rainer Basedow as Hew.
- Michael Habeck as Kew.

== Production ==
Das Rad was created in 2000 while Stenner, Uibel and Wittlinger were studying at the Film Academy Baden-Württemberg. The two stone creatures consisted of wooden bodies and eyebrows made of rubber and were shot in stop motion while the surroundings were animated by CGI.

During the shooting, before post-production began, Arvid Uibel died in 2000 at the age of 23. Stenner and Wittlinger dedicated Das Rad to him with the line “for Arvid”.

The music was by Roland Hackl and sound design by Bernd Müller.

=== Themes ===
A major theme is environmentalism. Other themes include cities, consumption, the passage of time, nature, and resources,

The main characters can be seen as spectators, possibly representing the point of view of nature itself. The narrative device of speeding up time illustrates humans' short lifespans and ephemeral effect on the environment, while the rock people illustrate the slow and ancient progression of geological time. The two narrative points of view are made conspicuous by lighting and camera differences, such as a change in the color of the sky. Stroboscopic light and camera movement is used to personify civilization.

== Awards ==
The film was nominated for the Academy Award for Best Animated Short Film in 2003, which was instead won by 2002 short film The ChubbChubbs!

Das Rad won several other awards in festivals like the Anima Mundi Animation Festival, Annecy International Animated Film Festival, Sweden Fantastic Film Festival, and the Fantoche International Animation Film Festival. It was also included in the Animation Show of Shows.
