= Lasko – Die Faust Gottes =

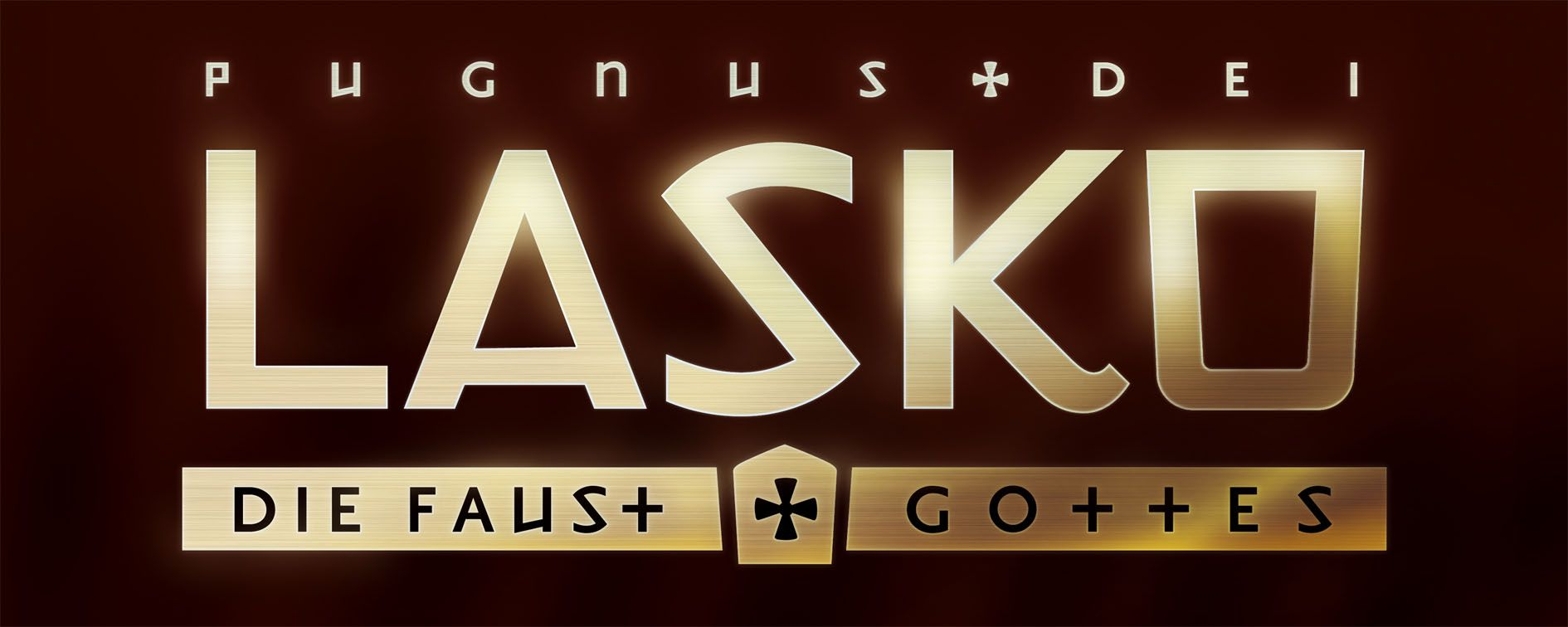
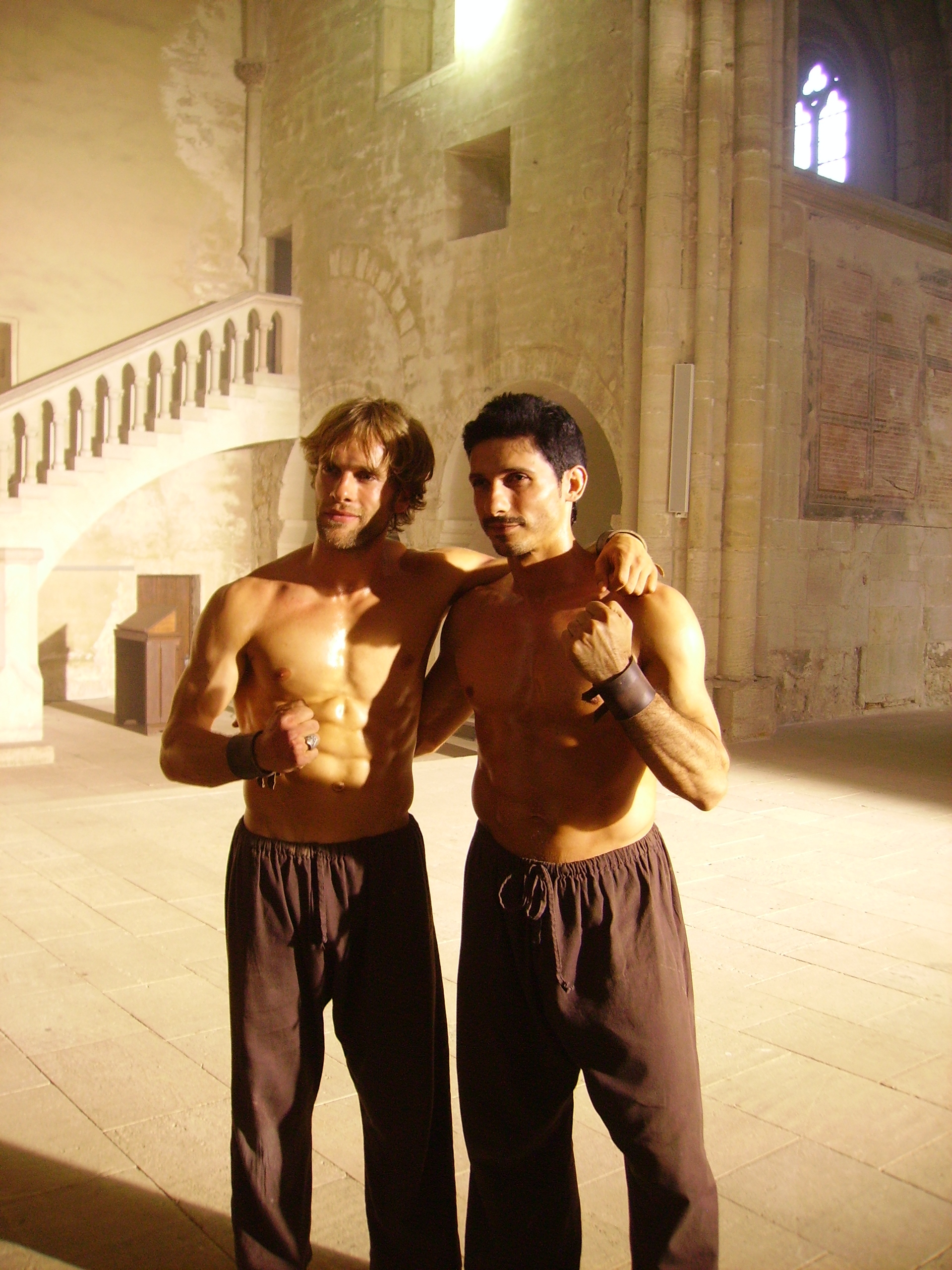
- Starring: Mathis Landwehr; Stephan Bieker; Simone Hanselmann; André Hennicke; Oliver Stritzel; Burkhard Driest
- Country of origin: Germany
- No. of seasons: 2
- No. of episodes: 15

Original release
- Network: RTL, ORF 1
- Release: 18 June 2009

Lasko – Die Faust Gottes (English: God's Fist) is a German action television series, an RTL co-production with ORF. First aired on 18 June 2009, it is set in a monastery and involves martial arts. The main character is a monk named Lasko, who uses martial arts to defend the downtrodden. Fifteen 45 minute episodes have been produced, in two series. The series was shot in the Naumburg area, Pforta, Neuenburg Castle and Königstein Fortress.

It is a sequel to the 2006 film Lasko: Death Train.

== See also ==
- List of German television series
