= Cecilia Pillado =

Argentine-German actor, pianist, and composer

Cecilia Pillado (born 1966) is an Argentine German actress, a classical pianist and composer. In Germany in 2005 she launched her own record label Tango Malambo, which was inactive until 2013. In the meanwhile her recordings were released under Sony Classical Germany.

== Biography ==
As a young adult, Pillado was a member of the Goethe-Institut Mendoza Theatre Company, directed by Gladys Ravalle, while pursuing her studies in music at the National University of Cuyo. It was through the Goethe Institute that she arrived in Germany, where she completed her drama and music studies at the Berlin University of the Arts with a scholarship from the Friedrich Naumann Foundation.

=== Acting career ===
It was through the Goethe-Institut that Pillado arrived in Germany, where she completed her drama and music studies at the Berlin University of the Arts.

After a few on-screen appearances she went to Los Angeles in 1998 to study with acting coaches. Returning to Germany in 2000, she was able to gain entry into the German television and film industry. Since then she has frequently appeared in soap operas, TV series, TV movies, and feature films.

=== Selected filmography ===
- Gute Zeiten, schlechte Zeiten (soap opera – 2016)
- Stung (film – 2015)
- Zwei Esel auf Sardinien (TV movie – 2015)
- Twin Sisters or Homeland (short film – 2013)
- Anna und die Liebe (telenovela – 2012)
- Verbotene Liebe (soap opera – 2012)
- Points of You (web series – 2011)
- Lotta & die großen Erwartungen (TV movie – 2011)
- The Ghost Writer (film – 2010)
- Der Gründer (film – 2010)
- Lotta & die alten Eisen (TV movie – 2010)
- Die Unbeweglichkeit der Dinge (film – 2009)
- Eine kleine Anekdote (film – 2008)
- Löwenzahn (TV series – 2007)
- Italienisch! (film – 2006)
- A Case for Two (TV series – 2005)
- SK Kölsch (TV series – 2004)
- Richter Alexander Hold (TV – 2002)
- Denninger (TV series – 2001)
- Gute Zeiten, schlechte Zeiten (soap opera – 2000)
- Sin querer (film – 1997)
- Wo ist das Tao? (film – 1988)

=== Piano career ===
Pillado did advanced studies at the Mozarteum in Salzburg and participated in master courses directed by György Sebők, Leon Fleisher, Maria Curcio and Paul Badura-Skoda. She studied Composition with Witold Szalonek and completed her classical preparation with Jazz Improvisation seminars by Walter Norris.

Pillado's CDs features Argentinian composers such as Ariel Ramírez, Alberto Ginastera, Ástor Piazzolla, Carlos Guastavino, as well as her own compositions.
