= Mathis Landwehr =

German actor (born 1980)

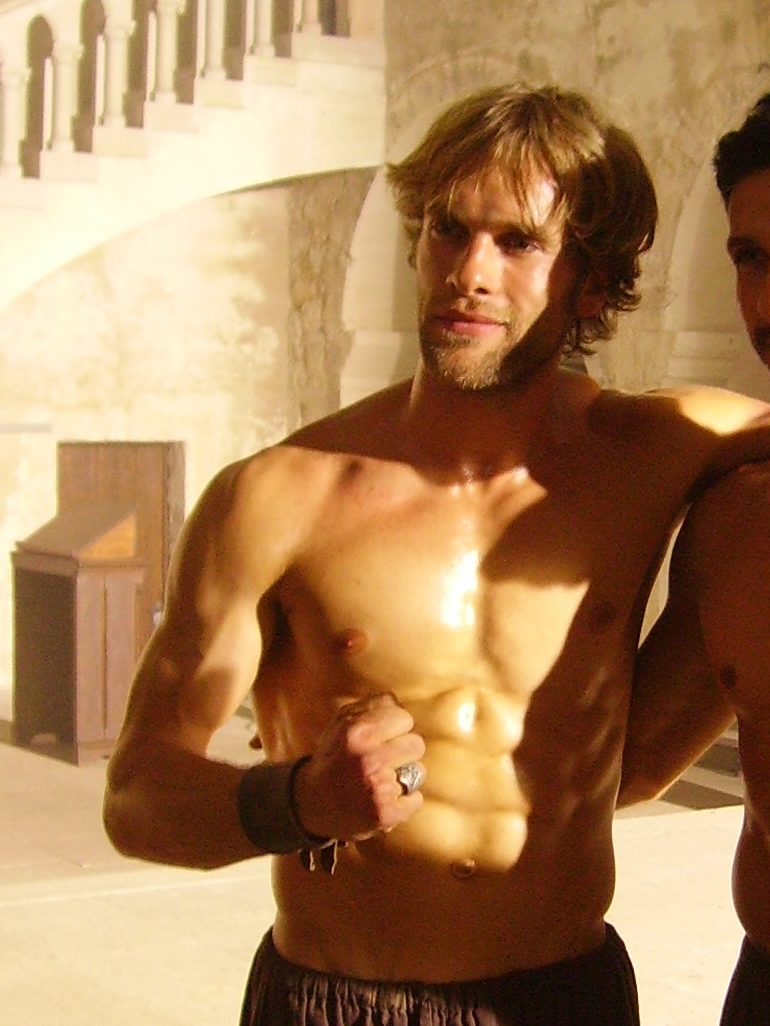
- Landwehr on the set of Lasko
- Born: 30 May 1980 (age 45); Stuttgart, West Germany
- Occupations: Actor, producer
- Years active: 2002–present

Mathis Landwehr (born 30 May 1980) is a German actor, film producer, stuntman and martial artist. He appeared in more than thirty films since 2002.

== Selected filmography ==
Film
Year	Title	Role	Notes
2006	Lasko: Death Train	Lasko	
2005	The Challenge	Jonas Klingenberg	
2005	V for Vendetta	Bodyguard	Uncredited
2005	Death Train	Lasko	TV movie
2007	Kingz	Mathis	Short film
2008	Perfect Hideout	Roth's Son	
2016	Darth Maul: Apprentice	Jedi Master	Short/Fan film
2017	Immigration Game	Joe	
2024	The Last Kumite	Michael Rivers	

TV
Year	Title	Role	Notes
2009–2010	Lasko – Die Faust Gottes	Bruder Lasko	15 episodes
