= Sehsuechte =

Sehsuechte (German: Sehsüchte; neologism generated of the words Sehnsucht (eng: longing) and sehen (eng: to view, to see)) is an international student film festival with an over 60 years lasting tradition. It takes place annually in spring in Potsdam-Babelsberg, Germany.

== History ==
From 1972 on, the so-called FDJ Student Film Days of the University for Film and Television Konrad Wolf (known as HFF) were held on the DEFA-campus in Potsdam-Babelsberg. However, in the course of Germany's reunification the FDJ Student Film Days were ended temporarily. After this short interruption, students of the study program Audiovisual Media Sciences revived the film fest in 1995 under the name Sehsüchte. Today the students of the master program Media Sciences are in charge of the festival's organization and are supported by the bachelor students of the program Digital Media Culture.

== Festival ==
Annually, about 120 short and feature films in the categories fiction, documentary, genre, animation as well as music videos and youth films are screened. The program always comprises films from Europe and the whole world. In 2016, the program included projects from 28 countries, such as Russia, Israel, India and China. A jury, consisting of prominent filmmakers and film experts, ultimately rewards the best oeuvres.

The organizers’ aim is to provide a platform to young international filmmakers and to enhance the exchange of ideas among themselves, with media and film professionals as well as with the broader audience. Especially the latter emphasizes that Sehsüchte always seeks to be a public event. Annually, about 8.000 film-enthusiasts, qualified visitors and journalists attend the several days lasting festival, which takes place in next to the famous Studio Babelsberg, Europe's oldest and biggest film studio.

== Competition ==
The international competition is divided into the sections Feature Film, Short Film, Documentary Film, Genre Film, Music Video, Spotlight Production, Future: Kids and Future: Teens. Live action and animation are treated equally.

The jury principally does not evaluate the films according to predefined criteria. However, esthetics, narration and originality loom large. One exception is the section Spotlight Production. Here the management and financial planning of the film's production are evaluated.

While in all competition sections an expert jury (in the case of Future: Kids and Future:Teens a children and youth jury) elects the winner, the music video award 2017 will be bestowed as an audience award.

Schreibsüchte is, in contrast to the remaining competition categories, a solely germanophone competition. Here the work of authors and project developers in the categories Screenplay and Pitch is appreciated and in both cases the most promising project awarded. Writing skills, dramatic composition and ingenuity are pivotal while feasibility remains secondary.

In the past, additionally those awards were bestowed:

- Award Against Exclusion (2003 - 2005, 2008 - 2010)
- Innovation Award (2003 - 2005)
- Editing Award (2003 - 2005, 2008 - 2015)
- Cinematography Award (2005, 2008 - 2010, 2012, 2013)
- German Junior Award (2005, 2008, 2009)
- Actor's Award (2008, 2010 - 2012, 2014, 2015)
- Focus-Dialog Award (2008 - 2010, 2012, 2013)
- Start-Up Award (2010)
- Sound Award (2015)

== Focus ==
Every year, the Sehsüchte Focus announces a geographical or socio-cultural topic that takes the center stage of the festival and thus invites to discover it in new and different manners. 2003 was overshadowed by 9/11 related topics. With a view to the Chinese Cinema 2005 the Focus series was established in the festival program. Under the Motto “Sehsüchte in Gold Fever” the student festival 2006 devoted itself to Russian Cinema. 2009 then, the view was directed to the Indian subcontinent, 2010 South Africa was in the focus, 2011 the Turkey. In 2012, for the first time, Sehsüchte Focus did not pivot on a specific region anymore but with “Sustainability” on a concept. In the year of 2013, the students put “Excess” in the center and during the Sehsüchte Festival 2014 everything turned to “Transit”. With the focus theme “Echo” in 2014 Sehsüchte bethought itself in its function as an audience festival and enhanced the exchange between filmmakers and their public. 2016 the motto „S.P.A.C.E.“ was elected and fitting to this the new competition category “Genre Film” was established. The overall topic of 2017's festival program will be called “surfaces”.

== Retrospective ==
When the HFF celebrated its 50-year existence in 2004, the Retrospective was established as a look back on the student films which were produced during this half a century. In 2009 the Retrospective succeeded in establishing itself through a monographic show of Andreas Dresen in the light of the fall of the Berlin Wall. In 2010 this historical screening series was devoted to Hans-Christian Schmid’s oeuvre. 2011 Sehsüchte showed several films of Wim Wenders, among others his work Pina in 3D, while in 2012 the Retrospective was attended to two filmmakers who could not be more different: the German director, writer and producer Doris Dörrie and the German splatter specialist, author and film critic Jörg Buttgereit. In 2013 the Retrospective was rethought and complemented with a playful Futurospective. Here, for the first time it was not anymore the monographic show of one single artist which was in the focus. Instead, everything turned on the question how filmmakers in the past and the present developed and enhanced innovative forms of film-making.

During the years 2015 and 2016, the Retrospective disappeared in the festival’s program before now in 2017 it will be revived. The motivation for this was the Media Science’s students’ wish to strengthen the integration of their fellow students in the festival's organization. So in 2017, the Retrospective for the first time will be curated autonomously by students of the Master program Film Culture Heritage.

== Jurors ==
The winner's films in the several competition categories are elected by expert juries respectively. Each year, those juries are recomposed with experienced filmmakers and experts of the media industry.

=== Selection (since 2001) ===
Year	Juror	Section
2001	Hannes Jaenicke Kerstin Stutterheim Hayo Freitag Kathrin Lemme	Feature Film Documentary Film Animated Film Production
2002	Dani Levy Volker Koepp Sabrina Wanie Mathias Schwerbrock Bettina Gries	Feature Film Documentary Film Animated Film Production Screenplay
2003	Conny Walther Thomas Heise Jochen Ehmann Uschi Reich Cooky Ziesche	Feature Film Documentary Film Animated Film Production Screenplay
2004	Axel Prahl Sandra Jakisch Gabor Steisinger Claus Boje Wenka von Mikulicz	Feature Film Documentary Film Animated Film Production Screenplay
2005	Ulrich Matthes Leszek Dawid Matthias Schellenberg Alexander Thies Sabine Holtgreve Joern Heitmann	Feature Film Documentary Film Animated Film Production Screenplay Music Video
2006	Sven Budelmann Pepe Danquart Raimund Krumme Oliver Berben Michael Töteberg Gabriel Hageni	Feature Film Documentary Film Animated Film Production Screenplay Focus
2007		
2008		
2009	Oli Weiss Niko Apel Fursy Teyssier Janine Jackowski Zoran Bihac Manzar Sehbai	Feature Film Documentary Film Animated Film Production Music Video Focus
2010	Fred Kelemen Christian Beetz Michel Sounvignier Jürgen Seidler Sven Bollinger Michael Hammon	Feature Film Documentary Film Production Screenplay Music Video Focus
2011	Peter R. Adam Sylvie Banuls Harald Siepermann Christoph Müller Christian Becker Eva-Maria Fahmüller Nikolaj Georgiew Volkan Özcan	Feature Film Documentary Film Animated Film Production Screenplay Pitch Music Video Focus
2012	Nora Tschirner Axel Engstfeld Robert Blalack Stefan Gieren Heide Schwochow Axel Bosse Valentin Thurn	Feature Film Documentary Film Animated Film Production Screenplay Music Video Focus
2013	Marc Rothemund Andreas Dresen David Sieveking Sol Bondy Isolde Schmitt-Menzel Jan Köppen	Feature Film Short Film Documentary Film Production Animated Film Music Video
2014	Dominic Raacke Friedrich Mücke Marcus Winterbauer Thomas Stellmach Alexander Wadouh Nicole Armbruster Jörg Winger Christian Larson Phillip-Müller Dorn	Feature Film Short Film Documentary Film Animated Film Production Screenplay Pitch Music Video Focus
2015	Henriette Confurius Maximilian Mauff Antje Boehmert Sandra Schießl Tanja Ziegler Gunther Eschke Niels Münter Lajos Wienkamp-Marques	Feature Film Short Film Documentary Film Animated Film Production Screenplay Music Video Sound
2016	Frederic Jaeger Dustin Loose Frauke Sandig Kerstin Meyer-Beetz Victor Orozco Ramirez Alexandra Staib Jan Martin Scharf Marion Bott Melbeatz	Feature Film Short Film Documentary Film Short Documentary Film Animated Film Production Screenplay Pitch Music Video

== Critics and awards ==
On the 17th of November 2010 Sehsüchte was awarded with the Potsdam Congress Award in the category “Periodic Event”. This award, including a prize money of 1.000 Euros acknowledges event organizers in the areas science, research, economy and culture who render outstanding services in realizing congresses and conferences in Potsdam as an ambassador of the provincial capital.

"The awards are as impressive as the juries’ members."

— MAZ 2009

„The intercultural exchange among young film makers and visitors, the diverse film programs as well as the numerous parallel events are all part of the concept that makes Sehsüchte so unique.”

— kino-potsdam.de 2010

„… a supporting program, with which its cordial atmosphere and diversity does not leave any wishes unfulfilled.“

— Berliner Arbeitskreis Film BAF 2010

„One strength is that each year the festival reinvents itself.”

— Potsdamer Neueste Nachrichten 2016
