= Film Academy Baden-Württemberg =

Public film school in Ludwigsburg, Germany

Coordinates: 48°53′37″N 09°11′27″E

Filmakademie Baden-Wuerttemberg
- Filmakademie Baden-Württemberg
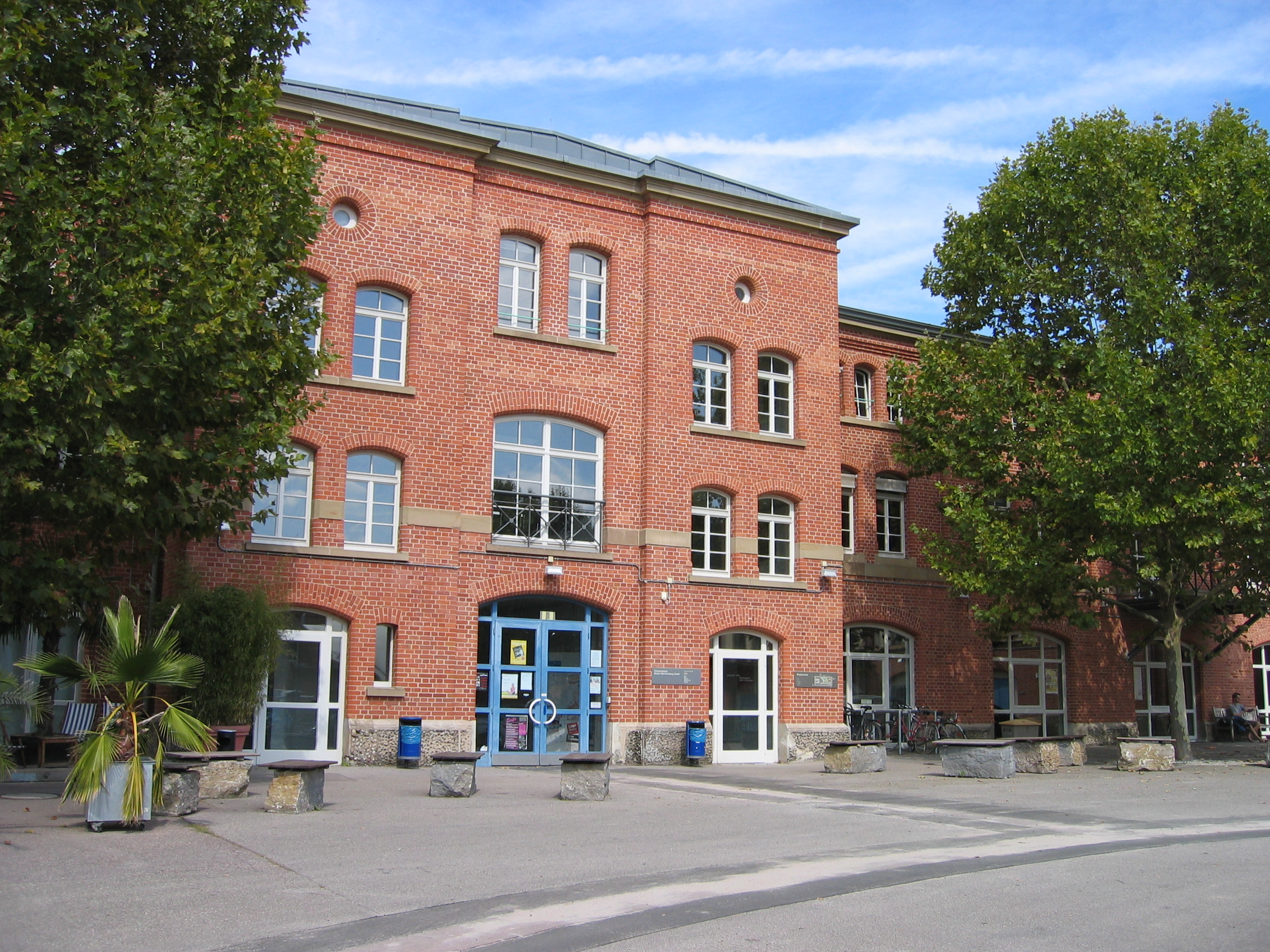
- Type: Public
- Established: 1991
- Affiliations: CILECT
- President: Prof. Thomas Schadt
- Location: Ludwigsburg, Baden-Württemberg, Germany
- Website: www.filmakademie.de

The Filmakademie Baden-Wuerttemberg (German: Filmakademie Baden-Württemberg) was founded in 1991 as a publicly funded film school in Ludwigsburg, Baden-Württemberg, Germany. The Filmakademie is one of the most internationally renowned film schools. One of its major distinguishing characteristics is the close collaboration with three other educational institutions on one campus: the Filmakademie's acclaimed Animationsinstitut (Institute of Animation and Visual Effects); the Atelier Ludwigsburg-Paris, an inter-university master-class on European film production and distribution hosted at the Filmakademie and in cooperation with notable French film school La Fémis in Paris and the National Film and Television School in London; and the neighbouring Academy of Performing Arts.

The Filmakademie's international focus is another important aspect of its work. Renowned lecturers from all over the world regularly teach in Ludwigsburg, and exchange programmes with prestigious partner universities in Europe, North and South America, Africa, and Asia give students insights into foreign film worlds. Every year, the Filmakademie Baden-Wuerttemberg organizes a "Hollywood Workshop“ for selected students at the UCLA in Los Angeles as well as a binational short film project in collaboration with students from La Fémis. Incoming students from foreign universities will take part in a course called International Class that offers English-language teaching modules.

== Studies ==
The project-oriented curriculum triggers learning by doing all the different stages of a film, television or interactive media production. More than 300 highly qualified experts from the film and media business instruct the students and take care of their projects. About 250 films of all genres and formats with top rankings on international festivals are produced every year by teams of students enrolled in advertising film, animation, cinematography, documentary film, editing, film and series production, film music, film sound, fiction film, interactive media, motion design, production design, screenwriting, and TV journalism. The Filmakademie Baden-Wuerttemberg only admits students who have at least one of year of practical experience in the film and media business. In addition to the full-fledged study courses, the Filmakademie also offers an International Screen Acting Workshop for aspiring young actresses and actors.

== Rankings ==
In 2003, the Art Directors Club awarded the Filmakademie the title of Germany's most creative university.

In 2006, issue 22 of FOCUS, the Filmakademie was ranked as the best film school in Germany. Evaluation criteria were the reputation of the university, the support for the students, the technical equipment and the number of awards won.

The animation institute at the Filmakademie Baden-Wuerttemberg was listed as second in the 3D World ranking in 2007, a global "Ivy League" table of the world's top animation schools.

In 2010 the prestigious magazine The Hollywood Reporter listed the Filmakademie Baden-Wuerttemberg as the only German institution on its ranking of the world's best film schools. In 2015, 2016 and 2017 the Filmakademie was again listed as one of the "15 best film schools in the world".

In 2017, the international awards and mentoring platform The Rookies named the Filmakademie Baden-Wuerttemberg and its Animationsinstitut the world's Best Visual Effects School and ranked it as No. 2 in the categorie Best Animation School.

== Awards ==
Five times, films made at the Filmakademie Baden-Wuerttemberg won a Student Academy Award (Oscar): Rochade (1998, directed by Thorsten M. Schmidt), NimmerMeer (Nevermore, 2007, directed by Toke C. Hebbeln), Von Hunden und Pferden (Of Dogs and Horses, 2012, directed by Thomas Stuber), Erledigung einer Sache (The Last Will, 2015, directed by Dustin Loose), and Galamsey (2017, directed by Johannes Preuss). Other international awards include a Golden Leopard awarded to Das Verlangen (The Longing, directed by Iain Dilthey) at the Locarno International Film Festival 2002, and an Oscar nomination for Das Rad (Rocks, directed by Chris Stenner, Heidi Wittlinger and Arvid Uibel) in the category "Best Animated Short Film" (2003).

== Notable alumni ==
- Anna Henckel-Donnersmarck (born 1973), filmmaker and curator
